= Collins (surname) =

- Pronunciation: /ˈkɒlɪnz/
- Language: English

Origin
- Languages: Middle English, Irish
- Origin: 1. Colin, Collin, Coll; 2. Ó Coileáin, Mac Coileáin
- Derivation: 1. relative or son of Coileáin; 2. pet form of Nicholas
- Meaning: 1. victory-people 2. puppy, young dog 3. darling 4. grove 5. hill

Other names
- Variant forms: Collin, Colling, Coling, Collings, Colings, Collis, Coliss, Collen, and Collens

Collins is a surname. There are many alternative spellings or related surnames.

The name may be derived from Coll or Colin, an English diminutive of the Greek name Nicholas; from the Irish word cuilein, meaning "darling"; from the Welsh collen, referring to a grove of hazel trees; or of the French colline, meaning "hill". It may be derived from "relative or son of Coileáin", and other meanings ascribed to it are "victory-people" or "puppy".

The earliest documented evidence of the name in England is in the 12th century. One Colinus de Andresia appears in the pipe rolls of Berkshire in 1191, while a Colinus is mentioned in Hartopp's "Register of the Freemen of Leicester" recorded in 1196.

In Ireland, Collins is one of the most common surnames, ranked number 30.

People with the surname Collins include:

== A ==
- Aaron Collins (footballer) (born 1997), Welsh footballer
- Aaron Collins (singer) (1930–1997), American singer/songwriter
- A. E. J. Collins (1885–1914), English cricketer and army officer
- Aidan Collins (born 1986), English footballer
- Alan Collins (sculptor) (1928–2016), English-born sculptor
- Alan Collins (writer) (1928–2008), Australian-Jewish author
- Al and Albert Collins (disambiguation), multiple people
  - Al "Jazzbo" Collins (1919–1997), American disc jockey, radio personality and recording artist
  - Albert Collins (politician) (1868–1956), New South Wales politician
  - Albert Collins (painter) (1883–1951), Australian painter, teacher and actor
  - Albert Collins (footballer) (1899–1969), English footballer
  - Albert Collins (1932–1993), American blues musician
- Albin Collins (1927–2006), American National Football League player
- Alex Collins (disambiguation), multiple people
  - Alex Collins (politician) (1876–1949), Canadian politician
  - Alex Collins (American football) (1994–2023), American football player
- Alexa Collins (born 1995), American influencer
- Alexander L. Collins (1812–1901), American judge, lawyer, and politician
- Alicia Collins, American politician
- Allan Collins (Australian rules footballer) (1919–2006)
- Allan M. Collins, cognitive and education scientist
- Allegra Collins (born 1972), American attorney, educator and judge
- Allen Collins (1952–1990), American guitarist
- Amelia Collins (1873–1962), prominent American Bahá'i
- An Collins, 17th-century English poet
- Andrew and Andy Collins (disambiguation), multiple people
  - Andrew Collins (judge) (born 1942), English barrister and judge
  - Andrew Collins (footballer, born 1965), Australian rules player for Hawthorn
  - Andrew Collins (broadcaster) (born 1965), British journalist, scriptwriter and broadcaster
  - Andrew Collins (cricketer) (1972–1999), English cricketer
  - Andrew Collins (actor) (born 1973), British actor
  - Andrew Collins (footballer, born 1988), Australian rules player for Carlton
  - Andy Collins (TV presenter) (born 1970), British television personality
  - Andy Collins (artist) (born 1971), American artist
  - Andy Collins (game designer), role-playing game developer and "Sage" for Wizards of the Coast
- Ann, Anne and Annie Collins (disambiguation), multiple people
  - Ann Collins (1916–1999), American painter
  - Anne Fraser née Collins (born 1951), New Zealand politician
  - Anne Collins (author) (born 1952), Canadian writer, editor and publishing executive
  - Anne Collins (contralto) (1943–2009), English opera singer
  - Annie Collins (born 19??), New Zealand film editor
- Anthony Collins (American football) (born 1985), American football player
- Anthony Collins (philosopher) (1676–1729), English philosopher
- Anthony Collins (composer) (1893–1963), British film score composer and conductor
- Anthony G. Collins (born 1949), Australian-American university president
- Art and Arthur Collins (disambiguation), multiple people
  - Art Collins (basketball) (born 1954), American basketball player
  - Arthur Collins (antiquarian) (1682–1760), English genealogist and historian
  - Arthur Collins (politician) (1832–1921), New Zealand politician
  - Arthur Collins (courtier) (1845–1911), English equerry in the courts of Queen Victoria and King Edward VII
  - Arthur Collins (theatre manager) (1864–1932), manager of Drury Lane Theatre
  - Arthur Collins (singer) (1864–1933), American singer
  - Arthur L. Collins (1868–1902), British metallurgist, mining engineer and mine manager
  - Arthur Collins (cricketer) (1871–1945), English cricketer
  - Arthur Greville Collins (1896–1980), American film director
  - Arthur Collins (rugby union) (1906–1988), New Zealand rugby union player
  - Arthur A. Collins (1909–1987), founder of Collins Radio
  - Arthur D. Collins Jr. (born 1947), chairman of Medtronic
  - Arthur R. Collins (born 1960), American political consultant
- Ashley Collins (born 1967), American artist
- Audrey Collins (1915–2010), English cricketer and sports administrator
- Audrey B. Collins (born 1945), American District Judge

== B ==
- Barbara-Rose Collins (1939–2021), American politician
- Barrie Collins, writer on the Rwandan genocide
- Beaux Collins (born 2002), American football player
- Becky Collins (born 1944), American swimmer
- Ben and Benjamin Collins (disambiguation), multiple people
  - Ben Collins (American football) (c. 1921 – 2014), American football player and coach
  - Ben Collins (soccer, born 1961), Liberian soccer midfielder
  - Ben Collins (racing driver) (born 1975), British racing driver
  - Ben Collins (programmer), Debian Project Leader from January 1999 to March 2001
  - Ben Collins, American screenwriter
  - Ben Collins (reporter), American journalist
  - Benjamin Collins (cricketer, born 1820) (1820–1903), English cricketer
- Bernadette Collins, British strategy engineer from Northern Ireland
- Bernie Collins (1935–2018), Canadian politician
- Bianca Collins (born 1988), American actress
- Bill and Billy Collins (disambiguation), multiple people
  - Bill Collins (catcher) (1863–1893), American baseball player on Cleveland Spiders' all-time roster
  - Bill Collins (outfielder) (1882–1962), American baseball outfielder
  - Bill Collins (footballer, born 1920) (1920–2010), aka Buster Collins, Northern Irish footballer
  - Bill Collins (racecaller) (1928–1997), Australian racecaller
  - Bill Collins (golfer) (1928–2006), American professional golfer
  - Bill Collins (television presenter) (1934–2019), Australian film critic and television presenter
  - Bill Collins (ice hockey) (born 1943), Canadian former ice hockey player
  - Bill Collins (athlete) (born 1950), Masters athletics world record sprinter
  - Billy Collins (Australian footballer) (1909–1987), Australian footballer for Melbourne
  - Billy Collins (born 1941), American poet
- Bob and Bobby Collins (disambiguation), multiple people
  - Bob Collins (footballer, born 1934) (1934–2018), Australian rules footballer for Footscray
  - Bob Collins (broadcaster) (1942–2000), American broadcaster
  - Bob Collins (politician) (1946–2007), Australian politician
  - Bobby Collins (footballer) (1931–2014), Scottish footballer
  - Bobby Collins (American football coach) (1933–2021), former American football coach
  - Bobby Collins (comedian) (born 1951), American stand-up comedian and film actor
  - Bobby Collins (basketball) (born 1966), American college basketball coach
  - Bobby Collins (tight end) (born 1976), former tight end in the National Football League
- Bootsy Collins (born 1951), American funk bassist, singer and songwriter
- Brent Collins (1941–1988), American actor
- Brian Collins (disambiguation), multiple people
  - Brian Collins (cricketer) (born 1941), former English cricketer
  - Brian Collins (speedway rider) (born 1948), Scottish former motorcycle speedway rider
  - Brian Collins (1970s singer) (born 1950), American country music artist
  - Brian Collins (2010s singer), American country music artist
  - Brian Todd Collins (born 1986), American rapper known as Kid Ink
  - Brian Collins (designer), American designer and creative director
- Bridget Jean Collins, maiden name of American playwright Jean Kerr
- Bud Collins (1929–2016), American journalist

== C ==
- Cal Collins (1933–2001), American jazz guitarist
- Calvin Collins (born 1974), American football guard
- Cardiss Collins (1931–2013), American politician
- Careena Collins (born 1967), American porn actress and director
- Carla Collins (born 1965), Canadian comedian, actress, TV host and writer
- Carr Collins Sr. (1892–1980), American businessman and philanthropist
- Catfish Collins (1943–2010), American guitarist, brother of Bootsy Collins
- Cecil Collins (artist) (1908–1989), British artist
- Cecil L. Collins (1926–2007), American politician
- Cecil Collins (football) (born 1976), American footballer and convicted burglar
- Chad Michael Collins (born 1979), American actor
- Charles and Charlie Collins (disambiguation), multiple people, including
  - Charles Collins (painter) (c. 1680–1744), Irish painter
  - Charles James Collins (1820–1864), English journalist and novelist
  - Charles Allston Collins (1828–1873), British Pre-Raphaelite artist
  - Charles Collins (New South Wales politician) (1850–1898), New South Wales politician
  - Charles Collins (ice hockey) (1882–1920), Canadian ice hockey player
  - Charles Collins (actor) (1904–1999), American actor
  - Charles E. Collins (American football), American football coach
  - Charles E. Collins (politician) (1929–2012), independent candidate for U.S. president in 1996 and 2000
  - Charlie Collins (footballer) (born 1991), English footballer
  - Charlie Collins (musician), Australian musician (female)
  - Charlie Collins (politician) (born 1962), Arkansas politician
- Chris Collins (disambiguation), multiple people, including
  - Chris Collins (New York politician) (born 1950), former U.S. Representative for New York's 27th congressional district
  - Chris Collins (Virginia politician) (born 1971), member of the Virginia House of Delegates
  - Chris Collins (soccer) (born 1956), American soccer player
  - Chris Collins (Canadian politician) (born 1962), Canadian politician from New Brunswick
  - Chris Collins (American musician), American musician, recording engineer/producer and technologist
  - Chris Collins (Australian musician), Australian musician, recording engineer and producer
  - Chris Collins (basketball) (born 1974), American basketball player and coach, son of Doug Collins
  - Chris Collins (lacrosse) (born 1982), American lacrosse player
  - Chris Collins (ice hockey) (born 1984), American ice hockey player
  - Chris Collins (singer), American musician and former vocalist for the band now known as Dream Theater
  - Chris Collins (writer), American television writer
- Christine Collins (rower) (born 1969), American rower
- Christopher Collins (disambiguation), multiple people
  - Christopher Collins (cricketer) (1859–1919), English cricketer
  - Christopher Collins (1949–1994), American actor, voice artist and comedian also known as Chris Latta
  - Christopher Graham Collins (born 1957), birth name of the British comedian Frank Skinner
- Chuck Collins (American football) (1903–1977), American football player and coach
- Chuck Collins (born 1959), American author on economic matters
- Clara Stone Fields Collins (1908–1981), Alabama legislator
- Clarence Collins (born 1942), American musician, vocalist. Founder of R&B vocal group Little Anthony and the Imperials
- Claudine Collins (born 1968), English businesswoman
- Clifton Collins Jr. (born 1970), American actor
- Coi Leray Collins (born 1997), American rapper and singer
- Colm Collins, Gaelic football manager
- Con Collins (1881–1937), Irish politician
- Cora Sue Collins (1927–2025), American child actress
- Corey Collins (born 2001), American football player

== D ==
- Dal Collins (1907–2001), South African cricket umpire
- Damian Collins (born 1974), British Conservative Party politician
- Dan, Daniel, Danielle and Danny Collins (disambiguation), multiple people
  - Dan Collins (baseball) (1854–1883), baseball player
  - Dan Collins (journalist), senior producer for CBS News.com
  - Daniel Collins (priest) (died 1648) Canon of Windsor
  - Daniel Collins (canoeist) (born 1970), Australian Olympic canoeist
  - Danielle Collins (born 1993), American tennis player
  - Danny Collins (footballer) (born 1980), Welsh footballer
  - Danny Boy Collins (born 1967), English wrestler
- Darnell Collins (1961–1995), American spree killer
- Darren Collins (disambiguation), multiple people
  - Darren Collins (Australian footballer) (born 1967), Australian rules footballer
  - Darren Collins (English footballer) (born 1967), English footballer
  - Darren Collins (athlete), Australian Paralympic athlete
- Darron Collins (born 1970), American human ecologist
- Daryl Collins (born 1956), Australian rules footballer
- David Collins (disambiguation), multiple people
  - Dave Collins (baseball) (born 1952), American baseball player
  - David Collins (lieutenant governor) (1754–1810), first Lieutenant Governor of Van Diemens Land (later Tasmania)
  - David Collins (New Zealand cricketer) (1887–1967), played for Wellington and Cambridge University
  - David Collins (judge) (born 1954), Justice of the High Court of New Zealand
  - David Collins (interior designer) (1955–2013), designer of interiors of bars and restaurants in London
  - David Collins (rower) (born 1969), American rower
  - David Collins (hurler) (born 1984), Irish hurler
- Dean Collins (dancer) (1917–1984), American dancer
- Dean Collins (actor) (born 1990), American actor
- Derek Collins (born 1969), Scottish footballer
- Des Collins (1923–2017), English footballer
- Desmond H. Collins, Canadian paleontologist
- Diana Collins (1917–2003), English social activist
- Dobson Collins (born 1987), American and Canadian football player from Georgia, US
- Dolly Collins (1933–1995), British folk singer
- Dominic Collins (1566–1602), Irish Jesuit lay brother, soldier and Roman Catholic martyr
- Dominic Collins (swimmer) (born 1977), Australian Paralympic swimmer
- Don Collins (disambiguation), multiple people
  - Don Collins (baseball) (1952–2022), American baseball player
  - Don Collins (born 1958), American basketball player
  - Don Collins, alleged rapist and murderer of Robbie Middleton
- Donal Collins (19??–2010), Irish priest and teacher convicted of sexual abuse of pupils in his charge
- Donald Collins (Maine politician) (1925–2018), American politician in Maine
- Donald Collins (Vermont politician) (born 1942), American politician in Vermont
- Dorothy Collins (1926–1994), American actress and recording artist (born Marjorie Chandler)
- Dottie Wiltse Collins (1923–2008), American professional baseball player
- Doug Collins (disambiguation), multiple people
  - Doug Collins (journalist) (1920–2001), Canadian journalist, alleged Holocaust denier
  - Doug Collins (footballer) (born 1945), English footballer
  - Doug Collins (Canadian football) (born 1948), Canadian football player
  - Doug Collins (basketball) (born 1951), NBA player, current coach
  - Doug Collins (basketball) (born 1951), NBA player, current coach
- Dwayne Collins (1988–2025), American basketball player
- Dylan Collins (born 1980), Irish businessman

== E ==
- Eamon Collins (1954–1999), IRA paramilitary and author
- Eamonn Collins (footballer) (born 1965), Irish footballer
- Earl Collins (politician) (1895–1958), Canadian politician
- Earl Gregory Collins (born 1960), Anglican priest and former Benedictine abbot
- Eddie, Edmund, Edward and Edwyn Collins (disambiguation)
  - Eddie Collins (actor) (1883–1940), American comedian, actor and singer
  - Eddie Collins (1887–1951), American baseball player and manager
  - Eddie Collins Jr. (1916–2000), American baseball player
  - Eddie Collins (born 1981), American rapper known as Greydon Square
  - Edmund John Patrick Collins (1931–2014), Australian Roman Catholic bishop
  - Edward Knight Collins (1802–1878), American shipping magnate
  - Edward Treacher Collins (1862–1932), British surgeon and ophthalmologist
  - Edward Joseph Collins (1886–1951), American composer and pianist
  - Edward Collins (figure skater) (fl. 1957–1959) Canadian
  - Edward Collins (Irish politician) (1941–2019), Irish Fine Gael politician
  - Edward J. Collins Jr. (c. 1944 – 2007), Massachusetts civil servant and public manager
  - Edwyn Collins, Scottish musician
- Efeso Collins (1974–2024), New Zealand politician
- Eileen Collins (born 1956), American astronaut, first female Space Shuttle pilot (STS-63) and commander (STS-93)
- Eleanor Collins (1919–2024), Canadian jazz singer, television host and civic leader
- Elijah Collins (born 2000), American football player
- Elisabeth Collins (1904–2000), British artist
- Elizabeth Collins (born 1982), Canadian swimmer
- Emily Parmely Collins (1814–1909), American suffragist, activist, writer
- Eoin Collins (born 1968), Irish tennis player
- Eric Dwayne Collins (born 1968), American rapper known as RBX
- Eric Collins (born 1969), American sports announcer

== F ==
- Felicia Collins (born 1964), American musician
- Florestine Perrault Collins (1895–1988), American photographer
- Floyd Collins (1887–1925), American cave explorer
- Francis Dolan Collins (1841–1891), American politician
- Francis Collins (born 1950), American geneticist
- Frank Collins (disambiguation), multiple people, several people
  - Frank Collins (footballer) (1893–19??), Irish footballer
  - Frank Collins (musician) (born 1947), British composer, singer and arranger
  - Frank Collins (British Army soldier) (1956–1998), SAS Soldier and Church of England Minister

== G ==
- G. Pat Collins (1895–1959), American actor
- Gail Collins (born 1945), American journalist and author
- Gary Collins (disambiguation), multiple people
  - Gary Collins (ice hockey) (1935–2022), Canadian player for the Toronto Maple Leafs
  - Gary Collins (actor) (1938–2012), American film and television actor
  - Gary Collins (American football) (born 1940), American football end and punter for the Cleveland Browns
  - Gary Collins (Idaho politician) (1942–2023), Republican Idaho State Representative
  - Gary Collins (racing driver) (born 1960), American stock car driver
  - Gary Collins (Canadian politician) (born 1963), Canadian politician
- Gavin Collins, British Anglican bishop
- Gavin Collins (baseball), American baseball player
- Gemma Collins (born 1981), English media personality and businesswoman
- Geoff and Geoffrey Collins (disambiguation), multiple people
  - Geoff Collins (Australian rules footballer) (1926–2005)
  - Geoffrey Collins (cricketer, born 1909) (1909–1968), English cricketer
  - Geoffrey Collins (cricketer, born 1918) (1918–2008), English cricketer
- George Collins (disambiguation), multiple people
  - George Collins (Nova Scotia politician) (1771–1813), mariner, merchant and political figure in Nova Scotia
  - George Collins (Australian politician) (1839–1926), Tasmanian politician
  - George Collins (cricketer, born 1889) (1889–1949), English cricketer
  - George R. Collins (1917–1993), American historian
  - George W. Collins (1925–1972), U.S. Representative from Illinois
  - George E. Collins (1928–2017), American mathematician
  - George Collins (footballer), English football manager
- Gerard Collins (canoeist) (born 1952), Irish slalom canoeist
- Gerry Collins (disambiguation), multiple people
  - Gerry Collins (politician) (born 1938), Irish Fianna Fáil politician
  - Gerry Collins (footballer) (born 1955), Scottish footballer and coach
  - Gerry Collins (broadcaster), Australian broadcaster
- Glen Collins (American football) (born 1959), American football player
- Glen Collins (footballer) (born 1977), New Zealand association football player
- Glenda Collins (born 1943), British pop singer
- Godfrey Collins (1875–1936), British politician
- Goldie Collins (1901–1982), Australian rules footballer
- Gordon Collins (1914–1986), English cricketer
- Grant Collins (born 19??), Australian drummer
- Gregor Collins (born 1976), American writer, actor, and producer
- Guy N. Collins (1872–1938), American botanist and geneticist

== H ==
- Hal Collins, American football coach
- Harlan Collins (born 19??), American composer
- Harold and Harry Collins (disambiguation), multiple people
  - Harold Collins (Australian politician) (1887–1962), Australian politician in Queensland
  - Harold Collins (strongman), (born 1957), American strongman and powerlifter
  - Harry Collins (footballer) (1892–1918), Australian rules footballer
  - Harry J. Collins (1895–1963), US Army general
  - Harry Warren Collins (1896–1968), American baseball pitcher known as Rip Collins
  - Harry Collins (born 1943), British academic
- Heidi Collins (born 1967), American news broadcaster
- Henry Collins (disambiguation), multiple people
  - Henry Collins (politician) (1844–1904), Canadian mayor of Vancouver
  - Henry Collins (official) (1905–1961), U.S. government employee and Soviet spy
  - Henry Collins (boxer) (born 1977), Australian boxer
- Herbert A. Collins (1865–1937), Canadian-born American landscape and portrait painter
- Herbert Collins (1885–1975), British architect
- Herbie Collins (1888–1959), Australian cricketer
- Hercules Collins (died 1702), English Baptist minister and author
- Hub Collins (1864–1892), American baseball player
- Hubert Collins (1936–2023), American politician in Kentucky
- Hugh Collins (born 1953), British legal academic

== I ==
- Ian Collins (disambiguation), multiple people, one of several people including:
  - Ian Collins (tennis) (1903–1975), British tennis player from the 1920s and 1930s
  - Ian Collins (footballer) (born 1942), Australian businessman and former Australian rules footballer
  - Ian Collins (radio presenter) (born 1966), UK radio presenter
  - Ian Collins (soccer) (born 1963), American soccer coach at the University of Kentucky
- Isaac Collins (disambiguation), multiple people, one of several people including:
  - Isaac Clinton Collins (1824–1879), American politician
  - Isaac J. Collins (1874–1975), American businessman, founder of the Anchor Hocking
  - Isaac Collins (American football), American gridiron football coach and player
  - Isaac Collins (baseball) (born 1997), American baseball player

== J ==
- Jacinta Collins (born 1962), Australian politician
- Jack Collins (disambiguation), multiple people, one of several people including:
  - Jack Collins (footballer, born 1904) (1904–1968), Australian rules footballer for Melbourne
  - Jack Collins (footballer, born 1910) (1910–1972), Australian rules footballer for Geelong
  - Jack Collins (actor) (1918–2005), American stage actor
  - Jack Collins (footballer, born 1925) (1925–1998), Australian rules footballer for Fitzroy and Essendon
  - Jack Collins (footballer, born 1930) (1930–2008), Australian rules footballer for Footscray and football administrator
  - Jack Collins (umpire) (1932–2021), Australian Test cricket umpire
  - Jack Collins (politician) (born 1943), American college basketball coach and politician in New Jersey
- Jackie Collins (1937–2015), British novelist
- Jacqueline Y. Collins (born 1949), American politician
- Jackson Collins (born 1998), Australian canoeist
- Jalen Collins (born 1993), American football player
- James Collins (disambiguation), multiple people, one of several people including:
  - James Collins (public servant) (1869–1934), Australian Secretary of the Department of the Treasury
  - James Lawton Collins (1882–1963), U.S. Army general
  - James L. Collins (1883–1953), Texas oil man and community philanthropist
  - James Collins (Irish politician) (1900–1967), Irish politician and father of Gerard Collins
  - James Francis Collins (1905–1989), U.S. Army general
  - James M. Collins (1916–1989), American politician
  - James Franklin Collins (born 1939), U.S. diplomat and Ambassador to Russia
  - James C. Collins (born 1958), American business theorist
  - James Collins (bioengineer) (born 1965), American bioengineer
  - James Collins (basketball) (born 1973), American basketball player
  - James Collins (footballer, born 1983), Welsh footballer playing for West Ham
  - James Collins (rugby union) (born 1986), English rugby union player
  - James Collins (footballer, born 1990), Irish footballer (Shrewsbury Town, Swindon Town, Hibernian)
- Jamie Collins (disambiguation), multiple people, one of several people including:
  - Jamie Collins (footballer born 1978), English footballer
  - Jamie Collins (footballer born 1984), English footballer
  - Jamie Collins (American football) (born 1989), American football player
- Jane Collins (born 1962), British Ukip Member of the European Parliament
- Jarron Collins (born 1978), American basketball player and coach
- Jason Collins (1978–2026), American basketball player
- Jason Collins (field hockey) (born 1977), British field hockey player
- Jason Collins (surfer) (born 1974), American surfer
- Javiar Collins (born 1978), American football player
- Jed Collins (born 1986), American football player
- Jennie Collins (1828–1887), labor reformer, humanitarian, and suffragist
- Jerry Collins (1980–2015), Samoan-born New Zealand rugby player
- Jess Collins (1923–2004), American artist
- Jessica Collins (born 1971), American actress
- Jessie Collins (born 1983), American actress
  - Jim Collins (curler), (c. 1922–1982), Canadian curler
  - Jim Collins (footballer, born 1923) (1923–1996), footballer for Barrow and Chester City
  - Jim Collins (ice hockey) (born 1951), Canadian ice hockey player
  - Jim Collins (linebacker) (born 1958), American football linebacker and NFL Pro Bowler
  - Jim Collins (singer) (born 1959), American country music singer-songwriter
  - Jim Collins (American football coach) (born 1966), head football coach at Saginaw Valley State University
  - Jimmy Collins (1870–1943), American baseball player
  - Jimmy Collins (footballer, born 1903) (1903–1977), English footballer who played for West Ham United
  - Jimmy Collins (footballer, born 1911) (1911–1983), English footballer
  - Jimmy Collins (footballer, born 1923), Irish goalkeeper during the 1940s and 1950s
  - Jimmy Collins (footballer, born 1937), Scottish footballer
  - Jimmy Collins (basketball) (1946–2020), American basketball player and coach
- J. Lawton Collins (1896–1987), American general and army Chief of Staff
- Jo Collins (born 1945), American model
- Joan Collins (born 1933), British actress
- Joe Collins (American football), American football player for the University of Notre Dame, 1908–1909
- Joe Collins (1922–1989), American baseball player
- Joely Collins (born 1972), Canadian actress and producer
- John Collins (disambiguation), multiple people, one of several people including:
  - John Collins (Andover MP) (1624–1711), English academic and politician
  - John Collins (mathematician) (1625–1683), English mathematician
  - John Collins (Independent minister) (c. 1632–1687)
  - John Collins (delegate) (1717–1795), Rhode Island delegate to Continental Congress
  - John Collins (poet) (1742–1808), English orator, singer, and poet
  - John Baptist Collins (died 1794), would-be French pirate
  - John Collins (governor), (1776–1822), American manufacturer and Governor of Delaware
  - John Collins Covell (1823–1887), American educator and school administrator
  - John S. Collins (1837–1928), American Quaker farmer who moved to southern Florida
  - John Churton Collins (1848–1908), English literary critic
  - John J. Collins (bishop) (1856–1934), American-born Catholic bishop in Jamaica
  - John Collins (New Zealand cricketer) (1868–1943)
  - John Collins (Fijian cricketer) (fl. 1895), Fijian cricketer
  - John F. Collins (1872–1962), Mayor of Providence, Rhode Island, 1939–1941
  - John Collins (VC) (1880–1951), English soldier awarded the Victoria Cross
  - John Augustine Collins (1899–1989), Royal Australian Navy
  - John H. Collins (academic) (1902–1981), American classical scholar
  - John Collins (priest), (1905–1982), UK radical Anglican cleric
  - John W. Collins (1912–2001), chess instructor
  - John Collins (jazz guitarist) (1913–2001), American
  - John F. Collins (1919–1995), Mayor of Boston, Massachusetts (1960–1968)
  - John A. Collins (chaplain) (1931–2003), Chief of Chaplains of the U.S. Air Force
  - John Collins (UK businessman) (born 1941), former head of National Power
  - John D. Collins (born 1942), British actor, best known for his role in 'Allo 'Allo
  - John Collins (footballer, born 1942), former English professional footballer
  - John J. Collins (born 1946), Irish biblical studies scholar
  - John C. Collins (born 1949), American theoretical particle physicist
  - John Collins (footballer, born 1949), former Welsh professional footballer
  - John Collins (sports executive) (born 1961), American sports executive
  - John Collins (footballer born 1968), Scottish football player and manager
  - John Collins (theater) (born c. 1969), American experimental theater director
  - John Collins (Australian musician) (born 1971), Australian bass player for Powderfinger
  - John Collins (musician/researcher) (born 19??), British
  - Johnny Collins (1938–2009), British folk singer
  - Johnson Collins (1847–1906), African-American politician
- Jon Collins (born 1960s), American basketball player
- Jonathan Collins (born 1961), Australian rules footballer
- José Collins (1887–1958), English actress and singer
- Joseph Collins (disambiguation), multiple people
  - Joseph Henry Collins (1841–1916), mining engineer and geologist
  - Joseph Collins (neurologist) (1866–1950), American neurologist
  - Joseph Lawton Collins (1896–1987), American soldier
  - Joseph T. Collins (1939–2012), American herpetologist
- Joyce Collins (1930–2010), American jazz pianist and singer
- Judith Collins (born 1959), New Zealand politician
- Judson Dwight Collins (1823–1852), Methodist missionary to China
- Judy Collins (born 1939), American singer and songwriter
- Julia C. Collins (c. 1842–1865), African-American writer
- Julia Collins (gameshow contestant) (born 1982), contestant on the American game show Jeopardy!
- Julie Collins (born 1971), Australian politician
- Justin Lee Collins (born 1974), British comedian

== K ==
- Karl Collins (born 1971), English actor
- Kate and Katherine Collins (disambiguation), multiple people
  - Kate Collins (actress) (born 1959), American actress
  - Kate Collins (journalist) (born 1983), South Australian television presenter
  - Kate Collins (author), American author
  - Katherine Collins (born 1947), Canadian cartoonist and writer
- Ken Collins (Scottish politician) (born 1939), Scottish MEP and environmentalist
- Keri Collins (born 1978), Welsh director and writer for film and TV
- Kelly Collins (born 1965), American racing driver
- Kerry Collins, American football quarterback in the National Football League
- Kevin Collins (disambiguation), multiple people
  - Kevin Collins (baseball) (1946–2016), American Major League Baseball player
  - Kevin Collins (ice hockey) (born 1950), National Hockey League linesman
  - Kevin Collins (American actor) (born 1972), American actor in theatre, film, television and radio drama
  - Kevin Andrew Collins (born 1974), child abducted from San Francisco in 1984
- Kim Collins (born 1976), runner from St Kitts and Nevis
- Kip Collins (1969–2006), American record producer and composer
- Kreigh Collins (tennis) (1875–1909), American tennis player

== L ==
- Landon Collins (born 1994), American football safety
- Larry Collins (writer) (1929–2005), American writer
- Lauren Collins (born 1986), Canadian actress
- Lawrence Collins, Baron Collins of Mapesbury (born 1941), British judge
- J. Lawton Collins (1896–1987), American General and Army Chief of Staff
- Lee Collins (disambiguation), multiple people, one of several people
  - Lee Collins (musician) (1901–1960), American jazz musician
  - Lee Collins (Scottish footballer) (born 1974), midfielder
  - Lee Collins (footballer born 1977), English non-league defender
  - Lee Collins (footballer) (1988–2021), English defender
  - Lee Collins (Unicode), one of the creators of Unicode
- Leigh Collins (1901–1975), English footballer
- Leon Collins (1922–1985), American dancer
- LeRoy Collins (1909–1991), American politician: 33rd Governor of Florida
- Les Collins (born 1958), British speedway rider
- Leslie Collins, American electrical engineer
- Lester Collins (landscape architect) (1914–1993), American landscape architect
- Lewis Collins (disambiguation), multiple people
  - Lewis Collins (RAF officer) (1894–1971), British World War I flying ace
  - Lewis Preston Collins II (1896–1952), Lieutenant Governor of Virginia
  - Lewis D. Collins (1899–1954), American film director
  - Lewis Collins (1946–2013), British actor
- Lily Collins (born 1989), British-American actress, model, and television personality
- Linda Collins-Smith (1962–2019), American politician
- Linton McGee Collins (1902–1972), American judge
- Lisa Collins (actress) (born 1968), Australian actress
- Lorence G. Collins (born 1931), American petrologist
- Loren W. Collins (1838–1912), American jurist and politician
- Lorenzo D. Collins (1821–1898), New York politician
- Lorenzo Collins (c. 1972–1997), American shot dead by police in Cincinnati
- Lorrie Collins (1942–2018), American country, rockabilly and rock 'n' roll singer
- Lottie Collins (1865–1910), English singer and dancer
- Louis L. Collins (1882–1950), 23rd Lieutenant Governor of Minnesota
- Lucinda Collins, Australian pianist
- Lui Collins (born 1950), American folk singer
- Lyn Collins (1948–2005), American singer
- Lynn Collins (born 1977), American actress

== M ==
- Mabel Collins (1851–1927), British writer on theosophy
- Mac Collins (1944–2018), American politician
- Maggie Collins, Australian band manager and radio announcer
- Manny Collins (born 1984), American footballer
- Marco Collins (born 1965), American radio personality
- Marcus Collins (disambiguation), multiple people, one of several people including:
  - Marcus Evelyn Collins (1861–1944), British architect
  - Marcus Collins (singer) (born 1988), British singer, contestant in UK's The X Factor
  - Marcus Collins (entertainer), American actor and singer
- Mardy Collins, American basketball player
- María Antonieta Collins (born 1952), Mexican journalist
- Marilyn Collins, British sculptor
- Mark Collins (disambiguation), multiple people, one of several people including:
  - Mark Collins (American football) (born 1964), American football player
  - Mark Collins (musician) (born 1965), English musician (The Charlatans)
  - Mark Collins (Director of the Commonwealth Foundation) (born 1952), English
- Martha Layne Collins (1936–2025), American businesswoman and politician, Democratic Governor of Kentucky from 1983 to 1987
- Martha Collins (poet) (born 1940), American poet
- Marva Collins (1936–2015), American teacher
- Mary Collins (disambiguation), multiple people, one of several people including:
  - Mary Collins (missionary) (1846–1920), American who worked among the Sioux
  - Mary Call Darby Collins (1911–2009), First Lady of Florida from 1955 to 1961
  - Mary Collins (politician) (born 1940), Canadian politician
  - Mary Cathleen Collins (born 1956), American actress known as Bo Derek
- Matthew Collins (disambiguation), multiple people, one of several people including:
  - Matthew Collins (Australian footballer) (born 1977) from Victoria
  - Matthew Collins (Welsh footballer) (born 1986), Welsh footballer
  - Matthew Collins (academic), professor of biomedical archaeology at York University
- Maude Collins, sheriff in Ohio
- Maurice Collins, one of several people including:
  - Maurice Collins (politician) (1878–1945), Australian politician
  - Maurice Collins (judge), Irish judge
- Max Collins (disambiguation), multiple people, one of several people including:
  - Max Allan Collins (born 1948), American mystery writer
  - Max Collins (musician) (born 1978), American musician
  - Max Collins (actress) (born 1992), Filipino American actress and model
- May Collins (1903–1955), American actress
- Mel Collins (born 1947), British musician
- Melissa Collins (born 1976), Canadian water polo player
- Michael Collins (disambiguation), multiple people, one of several people including:
  - Michael Collins (bishop) (1771–1832), Roman Catholic Bishop of Cloyne and Ross
  - Michael F. Collins (1854–1928), American newspaper publisher and politician
  - Michael Collins (Irish leader) (1890–1922), Irish Republican leader
  - Michael Collins (American author), pseudonym of American author Dennis Lynds (1924–2005)
  - Michael Collins (astronaut) (1930–2021), American astronaut, a member of the historic Apollo 11 crew
  - Michael Collins (Limerick politician) (1940–2022), Irish politician
  - Michael Collins (hurler) (1941–2009), Irish hurler
  - D. Michael Collins (1944–2015), Mayor of Toledo, Ohio, from 2014 to 2015
  - Michael Collins (soccer) (born 1961), American professional soccer midfielder
  - Michael Collins (writer and broadcaster) (born 1961), British author, journalist and television presenter
  - Michael Collins (Irish author) (born 1964)
  - Michael Collins (computational linguist) (born 1971), British-born researcher in computer science
  - Michael Collins (footballer, born 1977), Northern Irish footballer
  - Michael Collins (baseball) (born 1984), Australian baseball player
  - Michael Collins (footballer, born 1986), Irish and Oxford United professional footballer
  - Michael Collins (rugby union, born 1986) (born 1986), Welsh rugby union player
  - Michael Collins (New Zealand rugby player) (born 1993), rugby union player
  - Michael Collins (Dublin politician), Lord Mayor of Dublin 1977–1978
  - Michael P. Collins, Canadian structural engineer
- Michelle Collins (born 1962), British actress
- Michelle Collins (athlete) (born 1971), American sprinter
- Michelle Collins (comedian) (born 1981), comedian
- Mick and Mike Collins (disambiguation), multiple people, one of several people including:
  - Mick Collins (born 1965), American musician
  - Mike Collins (Australian footballer born 1939), former 1960s VFL footballer
  - Mike Collins (Australian footballer born 1953), former 1970s VFL footballer
  - Mike Collins (American football) (born 1960), head football coach at the University of Louisiana
  - Mike Collins (comics) (born 1961), British-born American comic book artist
  - Mike Collins (ice hockey) (born 1990), American ice hockey player
- Milt Collins (born 1985), American-Canadian football player
- Misha Collins (born 1974), American actor
- Mo Collins (born 1965), a comedian from the Fox television variety show MADtv
- Mo Collins (1976–2014), American football player
- Mortimer Collins (1827–1876), British novelist
- Muirhead Collins (1852–1927), English-born Royal Navy officer and Australian diplomat

== N ==
- Nancy Adams Collins (born 1947), politician in Mississippi
- Nancy A. Collins (born 1959), American writer
- Nancy W. Collins (born 1973), professor at Columbia University
- Napoleon Collins (1814–1875), American naval officer
- Nathan Collins (born 2001), Irish professional footballer
- Nathaniel Collins (born 1996), Scottish boxer
- Natasha Collins (1976–2008), English actress and model
- Nate Collins (born 1987), American football defensive tackle
- Neil and Neill Collins (disambiguation), multiple people
  - Neil Collins (speedway rider) (born 1961), English former speedway rider
  - Neil Collins (broadcaster), New Zealand broadcaster and local body politician
  - Neill Collins (born 1983), Scottish footballer
- Newton Collins (1819–1903), American businessman
- Nic Collins (drummer) (born 2001), Swiss-born drummer
- Nick Collins (English footballer) (1911–1990), English Association footballer
- Nick Collins (born 1983), American football player
- Nick Collins (composer) (born 1975), British composer
- Nick Collins (politician), American politician in Massachusetts
- Nico Collins (born 1999), American football player
- Nicolas Collins (born 1954), American composer
- Nicole Collins, Canadian artist
- Nigel Collins (disambiguation), multiple people
- Noel Collins (1936–2011), British actor
- Norm Collins (1904–1933), Australian rules footballer from Victoria
- Norman Collins (1907–1982), British writer and broadcasting executive

== O ==
- Otis G. Collins (1917–1992), American businessman and politician

== P ==
- Paddy Collins (1903–1995), Irish hurler
- Pat, Patricia and Patrick Collins (disambiguation), multiple people, one of several people including:
  - Pat Collins (showman) (1859–1943), British politician and fairground industry member
  - Pat Collins (baseball) (1896–1960), American baseball catcher
  - Pat Collins (American football) (born 1941), American football coach
  - Pat Collins (lighting designer) (1932–2021), American
  - Pat Collins (film critic), American reporter for WWOR-TV
  - Patricia Hill Collins (born 1948), American sociologist and author
  - Patrick Collins (politician) (1844–1905), Irish-born American politician
  - Patrick Collins (painter) (1911–1994), Irish painter
  - Patrick M. Collins (born 1964), American lawyer
  - Patrick Collins (American football) (born 1966), American football player
  - Patrick K. Collins (born 1977) rugby union Coach
  - Patrick Collins (footballer) (born 1985), player from England
  - Patrick Collins (director), American pornographic film producer and director
- Paul Collins (disambiguation), multiple people, one of several people including:
  - Paul Collins (end) (1907–1988), American football player
  - Paul Collins (artist) (born 1936), American realist painter
  - Paul Collins (actor) (born 1937), English actor
  - Paul Collins (Australian religious writer) (born 1940), Australian historian, broadcaster and writer
  - Paul Collins (fantasy writer) (born 1954), Australian writer
  - Paul Collins (musician) (born 1956), American drummer
  - Paul Collins (rugby union, born 1959), Irish international rugby union footballer
  - Paul Collins (runner) (1926–1995), Canadian long-distance runner
  - Paul Collins (English footballer) (born 1966), English association football player
  - Paul Collins (American writer) (born 1969), American writer
- Pauline Collins (1940–2025), British actress
- Pedro Collins, West Indian cricketer from Barbados
- Perry Collins (1815–1900), American explorer and entrepreneur
- Peter Collins (disambiguation), multiple people, one of several people including:
  - Peter Collins (racing driver) (1931–1958), British racing driver
  - Peter Collins (academic) (born 1945), British academic
  - Peter Collins (New South Wales politician) (born 1947), Leader of the Opposition of New South Wales, 1995–1998
  - Peter Collins (footballer) (born 1948), English footballer
  - Peter Collins (record producer) (1951–2024), English record producer
  - Peter Collins (speedway rider) (born 1954), English speedway rider
  - Peter B. Collins (born c. 1954), American broadcaster
  - Peter Collins (broadcaster), Irish sportscaster
  - Peter Collins (organ builder), English pipe organ builder
- Petra Collins (born 1992), Canadian photographer and fashion designer
- Phil and Philip Collins (disambiguation), multiple people, one of several people including:
  - Phil Collins (baseball) (1901–1948), Major League pitcher
  - Phil Collins (born 1951), English drummer, singer, songwriter, record producer and actor
  - Phil Collins (speedway rider) (born 1960), international motorcycle racer
  - Phil Collins (artist) (born 1970), UK photographic and video award nominee
  - Philip Collins (journalist) (born 1967), British journalist
- Porter Collins (born 1975), American rower

== R ==
- Rachel Collins (born 1976), American wrestler known as MsChif
- Ralph Collins (1924–2007), Scottish footballer and manager
- Randall Collins (born 1941), American sociologist
- Randy Collins (born 19??), Canadian politician and fraudster
- Ray and Raymond Collins (disambiguation), multiple people, one of several people including:
  - Ray Collins (baseball) (1887–1970), American baseball player
  - Ray Collins (actor) (1889–1965), actor
  - Ray Collins (American football) (1927–1991), American football defensive tackle
  - Ray Collins (rock musician) (1936–2012)
  - Ray Collins, Baron Collins of Highbury (born c. 1955), British trade unionist
  - Raymond J. Collins (1897–1965), New Zealand philatelist
  - Raymond Collins (priest) (born 1935), priest
- Richard and Richie Collins (disambiguation), multiple people, one of several people including:
  - Richard Collins (artist) (1755–1831), British miniature portrait painter
  - Richard Collins, Baron Collins (1842–1911), British law lord
  - Richard Collins (bishop) (1857–1924), British Roman Catholic bishop of Hexham and Newcastle
  - Richard J. Collins (1914–2013), American screenwriter and producer
  - Richard L. Collins (1933–2018), aviation writer
  - Richard A. Collins (born 1966), British scientist and author
  - Richie Collins (born 1962), Welsh rugby union international and coach
- Rickie Collins (born 2005), American football player
- Rip Collins (pitcher) (1896–1968), American Major League Baseball player
- Rip Collins (catcher) (1909–1969), American Major League Baseball backup catcher
- Ripper Collins (baseball) (1904–1970), American baseball player
- Ripper Collins (wrestler) (1933–1991), American professional wrestler
- Rob and Robert Collins (disambiguation), multiple people, one of several people including:
  - Rob Collins (musician) (1963–1996), English musician
  - Rob Collins (ice hockey) (born 1978), Canadian ice hockey player
  - Rob Collins (actor) (born 1979), Australian actor
  - Robert Martin Collins (1843–1913), Queensland politician and grazier
  - Robert A. Collins (1924–2003), American politician
  - Robert Frederick Collins (born 1931), U.S. federal judge
- Roberta Collins (1944–2008), American actress
- Robin Collins (born 19??), American philosopher
- Roddy Collins (born 1961), Irish football player and manager
- Roger Collins (born 1949), English medievalist
- Ronald Collins (disambiguation), multiple people:
  - Ronald K. L. Collins (born 1949), American scholar and lawyer
  - Ronald F. Collins (born 19??), American politician in Maine
- Roosevelt Collins (born 1968), American football player
- Rory Collins (born 1955), British epidemiologist
- Ross A. Collins (1880–1968), American Congressman from Mississippi
- Roy Collins (1934–2009), English cricketer
- Rubin Collins (born 1953), American basketball player
- Rudy Collins (1934–1988), American jazz drummer
- Russell Collins (1897–1965), American actor

== S ==
- Sam, Sammy and Samuel Collins (disambiguation), multiple people
  - Sam Collins (musician) (1887–1949), American blues singer and guitarist
  - Sam L. Collins (1895–1965), American politician
  - Sam Collins (Australian footballer) (born 1994), Australian rules footballer for Fremantle
  - Sam Collins (English footballer) (born 1977), English footballer
  - Sammy Collins (1923–1998), English footballer
  - Samuel Collins (theologian) (1576–1651), English clergyman and academic
  - Samuel Collins (physician) (1619–1670), British doctor
  - Samuel Collins (artist) (1735–1768), British artist
  - Samuel W. Collins (1802–1870), American axe manufacturer
  - Samuel Collins (physicist) (1898–1984), physicist at MIT
- Savanna Collins (born 2006), dancer, singer, and member of group Girlset
- Sandra Collins (born 19??), American DJ
- Sandy Collins (tennis) (born 1958), American tennis player
- Sandy Collins (politician) (born 1978), member of the Newfoundland and Labrador House of Assembly
- Sara Collins, British novelist
- Sarah Collins, American woman who enlisted in the Unionist army in the American Civil War
- Sean Collins (disambiguation), multiple people
  - Seán Collins (politician) (1918–1975), Irish Fine Gael politician from Cork, TD 1948–1957 and 1961–1969
  - Sean Collins (surf forecaster) (1952–2011), founder of Surfline
  - Sean Collins (ice hockey defenceman) (born 1983), American ice hockey defenceman
  - Sean Collins (ice hockey forward b. 1983), American minor pro ice hockey forward
  - Sean Collins (ice hockey b. 1988), Canadian ice hockey player drafted by the Columbus Blue Jackets
- Seth Collins (born 1996), American football player
- Seward Collins (1899–1952), American publisher and self-declared fascist
- Shane Collins (disambiguation), multiple people, one of several people
  - Shane Collins (field hockey) (born 1963), field hockey player from New Zealand
  - Shane Collins (American football) (born 1969), American football defensive end
- Shano Collins (1885–1955), American baseball player
- Shawn Collins (born 1967), American football player
- Sherron Collins (born 1987), American basketball player
- Shirley Collins (born 1935), British folk singer
- Shirley Collins (politician) (born 1952), Canadian politician
- Sid Collins (1922–1977), American broadcaster
- Simon Collins (footballer) (born 1973), English football player and manager
- Simon Collins (born 1976), Canadian musician
- Sonny Collins (born 1953), American football running back
- Stanley Collins (1909–1993), South African cricket umpire
- Stef Collins (born 1982), British international basketball player
- Stephen, Steve and Steven Collins (disambiguation), multiple people
  - Stephen Collins (politician) (1847–1925), British Liberal politician, MP for Kennington
  - Stephen Collins (born 1947), American actor
  - Stephen Collins (journalist) (born 19??), Irish journalist
  - Steven Collins (archaeologist), Albuquerque, New Mexico
  - Steve Collins (baseball) (1918–?), minor league player-manager
  - Steve Collins (footballer) (born 1962), defender with Peterborough United and Southend
  - Steve Collins (born 1964), Irish boxer
  - Steve Collins (ski jumper) (born 1964), from Canada
  - Steve Collins (American football) (born 1970), Oklahoma Sooners quarterback
  - Steven Collins (born 19??), lecturer in the Department of Computer Science in Trinity College, Dublin
- Stuart Collins (born 19??), Australian rugby league footballer
- Susan Collins (born 1952), American politician
- Susan Collins (artist) (born 1964), English artist and academic
- Suzanne Collins (disambiguation), multiple people
  - Suzanne Collins (born 1962), American writer (The Hunger Games)
  - Suzanne Collins (actress) (born 1978), English actress
  - Suzanne Marie Collins (1966–1985), American Marine Corps Lance Corporal and murder victim

== T ==
- Tai Collins (born 1962), American model, actress and screenwriter
- Tank Collins (born 1969), American basketball player
- Ted Collins (disambiguation), multiple people
  - Ted Collins (Australian footballer) (1893–1974), Australian rules footballer for St Kilda
  - Ted Collins (Canadian football) (c. 1943—2021), Canadian football player
  - Ted Collins (talent manager) (1900–1964), American show-biz manager and owner of American football team franchises
- Terry Collins (born 1949), American baseball manager
- Tess Collins (born 19??), American novelist and theatre manager
- Thomas Collins (disambiguation), multiple people, one of several people including:
  - Thomas Collins (governor) (1732–1789), American lawyer and Governor of Delaware
  - Thomas Collins (UK politician) (died 1884), Member of Parliament for Knaresborough and Boston
  - Thomas Collins (cricketer, born 1841) (1841–1934), English cricketer
  - Thomas D. Collins (1847–1935), American soldier who fought in the American Civil War
  - Thomas Collins (bishop of Meath) (1873–1927), Irish Anglican bishop
  - Thomas Collins (Australian politician) (1884–1945), Australian MP and Postmaster-General
  - Thomas Collins (cricketer, born 1895) (1895–1964), English cricketer
  - Thomas LeRoy Collins (1909–1991), governor of Florida
  - Thomas Patrick Collins (1915–1973), American-born Catholic bishop in Bolivia
  - Thomas H. Collins (born 1946), Commandant of the United States Coast Guard
  - Thomas Christopher Collins (born 1947), Canadian Roman Catholic Cardinal
- Tim Collins (disambiguation), multiple people, one of several people including:
  - Tim Collins (footballer) (1889–?), Australian rules footballer
  - Tim Collins (financier) (born 1956), American businessman and financier
  - Tim Collins (British Army officer) (born 1960), British army officer
  - Tim Collins (politician) (born 1964), British politician
  - Tim Collins (baseball) (born 1989), American Major League Baseball pitcher
  - Tim Collins (manager), former manager for the band Aerosmith
- Tod and Todd Collins (disambiguation), multiple people, one of several people including:
  - Tod Collins (1876–1942), Australian rules footballer
  - Todd Collins (linebacker) (born 1970), American football linebacker
  - Todd Collins (quarterback) (born 1971), American football quarterback
- Tom and Tommy Collins (disambiguation), multiple people, one of several people including:
  - Tom Collins, pseudonym of Joseph Furphy (1843–1912), Australian author
  - Tom Collins (footballer) (1882–1929), Scottish international footballer
  - Tom Francis Collins (1886–1907), English drifter convicted of murder in New Brunswick
  - Tom Collins (athlete), Irish athlete who held the 5-mile world record
  - Tom Collins (rugby, born 1895) (1895–1957), rugby union international and rugby league footballer of the 1920s
  - Tom Collins (dual player) (died 2008), hurler and Gaelic footballer from County Kerry, Ireland
  - Tom Collins (boxer) (born 1955), British boxer
  - Tommy Collins (singer) (1930–2000), stage name of Leonard Sipes, American country music singer-songwriter
  - Tommy Collins (filmmaker), Irish film director and producer
- Tony Collins (disambiguation), multiple people, one of several people including:
  - Tony Collins (footballer) (1926–2021), first black manager in the English Football League
  - Tony Collins (American football) (born 1959), American football player
  - Tony Collins (historian), British social historian
- Tory Collins (born 19??), American footballer
- Tru Collins (born 1986), American actress and indie-pop singer
- Tyler Collins (singer) (born 1965), American singer
- Tyler Collins (baseball) (born 1990), American baseball player

== V ==
- Valentine Collins (1894–1918), British World War I flying ace
- Victor Collins, Baron Stonham (1903–1971), British politician
- Vinson Allen Collins (1867–1966), Texas politician
- Vivianne Collins (born 1973), American TV host

== W ==
- Warwick Collins (1948–2013), British novelist
- Wayne M. Collins (1900–1974), American civil rights attorney
- Wilkie Collins (1824–1889), British writer
- William Collins, one of several people including:
  - William Collins (Roundhead), English politician who sat in the House of Commons from 1654 to 1659
  - William Collins (poet) (1721–1759), English poet
  - William Collins (colonist), (1760–1819) English naval officer and early settler in Tasmania, Australia
  - William Collins (painter) (1788–1847), English landscape artist
  - William Collins (publisher) (1789–1853), Scottish publisher; founder of Collins publishing house
  - William Lucas Collins (1815–1887), English author and clergyman of the Church of England
  - William Collins (Lord Provost) (1817–1895), Scottish temperance movement activist
  - William Collins (New York politician) (1818–1878), U.S. congressman from New York
  - William Collins (cricketer, born 1837) (1837–1876), Australian cricketer
  - William Collins (New Zealand member of parliament) (1853–1923), New Zealand Member of Parliament for Christchurch
  - William Collins (New Zealand surgeon) (1853–1934), surgeon, politician, played rugby for England and cricket in New Zealand
  - William Collins (surgeon) (1859–1946), British surgeon and Liberal Party politician
  - William Wiehe Collins (1862–1951), English architectural and landscape genre painter
  - William Collins (bishop) (1867–1911), Bishop of Gibraltar in the Church of England
  - William Collins (cricketer, born 1868) (1868–1942), English cricketer
  - William Henry Collins (1878–1937), Canadian geologist
  - William Floyd Collins (1887–1925), American cave explorer
  - William J. Collins (1896–1981), president of St. Ambrose University
  - William Collins (canoeist) (1932–1993), Canadian canoeist who competed in the 1956 Summer Olympics
  - William A. Collins (1935–2022), American politician, state representative and mayor
- Wilson Collins (1889–1941), American baseball outfielder
- Winifred Collins (1911–1999), Chief of Naval Personnel for Women, US Navy

== Y ==
- Yuri Collins (born 2001), American basketball player

== Z ==
- Zach Collins (born 1997), American basketball player
- Zack Collins (born 1995), American baseball player
- Zaven Collins (born 1999), American football player

== Fictional characters ==
- Barnabas Collins, fictional vampire from Dark Shadows
- Bart Collins, fictional character from The 5,000 Fingers of Dr. T.
- Chris Collins, a character in the 1990 American natural horror comedy movie Arachnophobia
- David Collins (Dark Shadows), fictional character from Dark Shadows
- David Collins (EastEnders), fictional character from EastEnders
- Mr. Emery Collins (Mr. Collins), the mean Manager in Ghost Dad played by Barry Corbin
- Gordon Collins (Brookside), fictional character from British soap opera Brookside
- Heather Collins (The Pitt), fictional character from The Pitt
- Molly Collins, fictional character from The Amazing World of Gumball
- Jeremiah Collins, fictional character from Dark Shadows
- Quentin Collins, fictional werewolf from Dark Shadows
- Rusty Collins, fictional character from X-Factor comics
- Tom Collins (Rent character), character in the rock musical Rent
- Victor Collins (General Hospital), a fictional character in the U.S. TV soap opera General Hospital
- Wesley Collins, fictional character from Power Rangers Time Force
- Mr William Collins, character in the Jane Austen novel Pride and Prejudice

== See also ==
- Collins-class submarine, six Australian-built diesel-electric submarines used in the Royal Australian Navy
- Collins English Dictionary, printed and online English Dictionary
- The Collins Bird Guide, field guide to the birds of the Western Palearctic
- The Collins College of Hospitality Management, part of the California State Polytechnic University, Pomona
- The Collins Companies, American forest products company
- The Collins Kids, American rockabilly duo
- Sam Collins Day, local holiday in parts of Connecticut
- Tom Collins, cocktail
- William Collins, Sons, Scottish printing company
- William Collins (imprint), a nonfiction publishing brand launched by HarperCollins in 2014
