= Geoffrey Collins =

Geoffrey Collins may refer to:

- Geoff Collins (American football) (born 1971), American football coach
- Geoff Collins (1926–2005), Australian rules footballer
- Geoffrey Collins (cricketer, born 1909) (1909–1968), English cricketer
- Geoffrey Collins (cricketer, born 1918) (1918–2008), English cricketer
- Geoffrey Collins (musician), Australian flautist
- Geoffrey Abdy Collins (1888–1986), British solicitor
