= Dorothy Collins (disambiguation) =

Dorothy Collins can refer to

- Dorothy Collins (1926–1994), an American actress and recording artist (born Marjorie Chandler)
- Dottie Wiltse Collins (1923–2008), an American professional baseball player
- Dolly Collins (1933–1995) English folk musician, arranger and composer.

== See also ==
- Collins (surname)
