= Matthew Collins =

Matthew Collins may refer to:

- Matthew Collins (Welsh footballer) (born 1986), Welsh footballer for Hungerford Town
- Matthew Collins (Australian footballer) (born 1977), Australian rules footballer
- Matthew Collins (academic), Professor of biomolecular archaeology
- Matthew Collins (rower) (born 1967), American lightweight rower
- Matthew Collins (barrister) (born 1970), Australian barrister
- Matthew F. Collins (born 1972), British activist
- Matthew Collins, a fictional character in the 1953 film The War of the Worlds

== See also ==
- Mathew Collins (born 2004), Swiss footballer
- Matthew Collings (born 1955), British art critic and broadcaster
- Collins (surname)
