= Ian Collins =

Ian Collins may refer to:

- Ian Collins (footballer) (born 1942), Australian businessman and former Australian rules footballer
- Ian Collins (radio presenter) (born 1966), UK radio presenter
- Ian Collins (soccer) (born 1963), soccer coach at the University of Kentucky
- Ian Collins (swimmer) (born 1962), British swimmer
- Ian Collins (tennis) (1903–1975), British tennis player from the 1920s and 1930s

== See also ==
- Collins (surname)
