= Kevin Collins =

Kevin Collins may refer to:

- Kevin Collins (American actor) (born 1972), American actor in theatre, film, television and radio drama
- Kevin Andrew Collins (born 1974), child abducted from San Francisco in 1984
- Kevin Collins (General Hospital), fictional character on the American soap opera General Hospital and its spin-off Port Charles
- Kevin Collins (baseball) (1946–2016), American Major League Baseball player
- Kevin Collins (bridge) American bridge player
- Kevin Collins (cricketer) (born 1954), New Zealand cricketer
- Kevin Collins (footballer) (1922–2007), Australian rules footballer
- Kevin Collins (ice hockey) (born 1950), retired National Hockey League linesman
- Kevin Collins, a variant of the Tom Collins cocktail
