= Darren Collins =

Darren Collins may refer to:

- Darren Collins (English footballer) (born 1967), English former footballer
- Darren Collins (Australian footballer) (born 1967), former Australian rules footballer
- Darren Collins (athlete), Australia Paralympic athlete

== See also ==
- Darron Collins (born 1970), American human ecologist
