= Isaac Collins =

Isaac Collins may refer to:

- Isaac Collins (printer) (1746–1817), colonial printer, publisher, bookseller and merchant; see List of early American publishers and printers
- Isaac Clinton Collins (1824–1879), American politician
- Isaac J. Collins (1874–1975), American businessman, founder of the Anchor Hocking
- Isaac Collins (American football), American gridiron football coach and player
- Isaac Collins (baseball) (born 1997), professional baseball player
