= Sean Collins =

Sean Collins may refer to:

== Sports ==
- Sean Collins (ice hockey forward, born 1983), American player drafted by Colorado Avalanche
- Sean Collins (ice hockey defenseman) (born 1983), American player for Washington Capitals
- Sean Collins (ice hockey, born 1988), Canadian player for Columbus Blue Jackets and Washington Capitals

== Others ==
- Seán Collins (politician) (1918–1975), Irish Fine Gael TD 1948–1957 and 1961–1969
- Sean Collins (surfing) (1952–2011), American founder of Surfline

== See also ==
- Shawn Collins (born 1967), American football player
- Shaun Collins, South African musician, former member of Cutting Jade
- Shane Collins (disambiguation)
