= Richard Collins =

Richard Collins may refer to:

- Richard Collins (actor) (1947–2013), actor of the television show Trailer Park Boys
- Richard Collins (artist) (1755–1831), British miniature portrait painter
- Richard Collins (bishop) (1857–1924), Roman Catholic bishop of Hexham and Newcastle
- Richard Collins (historian), Kentucky historian and a founder of The Filson Historical Society
- Richard A. Collins (born 1966), British scientist and author
- Richard G. Collins (born 1949), member of the Delaware House of Representatives
- Richard J. Collins (1914–2013), American screenwriter and producer
- Richard L. Collins (1933–2018), aviation writer
- Richard Collins, Baron Collins (1842–1911), British law lord

== See also ==
- Richard Collin (1626–1698), engraver from Luxemburg
- Richard H. Collin (1932–2010), history professor and New Orleans food writer
- Richie Collins (born 1962), Welsh rugby player
