= Gerry Collins =

Gerry Collins is the name of:

- Gerry Collins (broadcaster), Australian sports broadcaster
- Gerry Collins (footballer) (1955–2024), Scottish footballer and coach
- Gerry Collins (politician) (1938–2026), Irish Fianna Fáil politician from Limerick and senior government minister
- Gerard Collins (artist), (born 1957) Canadian painter
- Gerard Collins (canoeist) (born 1952), Irish slalom canoer
- Gerry Collins (Canadian football) (born 1969), American player of Canadian football

== See also ==
- Jerry Collins (1980–2015), New Zealand rugby player
