= Anne Collins =

Anne Collins may refer to:

- Anne Fraser (born 1951), New Zealand politician, also known by her maiden name of Collins
- Anne Collins (author), winner of Governor General's Award for English language non-fiction
- Anne Collins (contralto) (1943–2009), British opera singer
- Ann Collins (1916–1999), American artist
- An Collins, 17th-century poet

== See also ==
- Collins (disambiguation)
