= Sam Collins Day =

Local holiday in Connecticut, US

- Date: Third Saturday in September
- 2024 date: September 21
- 2025 date: September 20
- 2026 date: September 19
- 2027 date: September 18
- Frequency: annual

Sam Collins Day is a local holiday in Canton/Collinsville Connecticut, United States. It is celebrated on the 3rd Saturday in September, and is a showcase of local businesses, clubs, and other organizations. The event is named after Samuel W. Collins, who built the Collins Axe Factory on the Farmington River, around which the area of downtown Canton, now known as Collinsville, developed.

== Location ==
Sam Collins Day is held at the Canton Springs Fire Department field.

== Events ==
Events at Sam Collins Day include live entertainment, a pancake breakfast, a number of tents with local businesses handing out freebies, entertainment for children, a Teacup Auction, and various foodstuffs.
