= Todd Collins =

Todd Collins may refer to:

- Todd Collins (linebacker) (born 1970), American football linebacker
- Todd Collins (quarterback) (born 1971), American football quarterback
- Todd Collins (producer), music producer and member of American band Peace of Mind

== See also ==
- Tod Collins (1876–1942), Australian rules footballer
- Collins (surname)
