= Brian Collins =

Brian Collins may refer to:

- Brian Collins (1970s singer) (born 1950), American country music artist
- Brian Collins (2010s singer), American country music artist
- Brian Collins (basketball) (born 1984), American college basketball coach
- Brian Collins (cricketer) (born 1941), former English cricketer
- Brian Collins (designer), American designer and creative director
- Brian Collins (speedway rider) (born 1948), Scottish former motorcycle speedway rider
- Brian Collins (Gaelic footballer)
- Kid Ink (born 1986), American rapper
- Brian Collins, a reporter in Waco, Texas; famous for creating the line "Boom goes the dynamite"

== See also ==
- Brian Colin (born 1956), American video-game designer, artist and animator
- Collins (surname)
