= Florestine Perrault Collins =

African-American photographer based in New Orleans

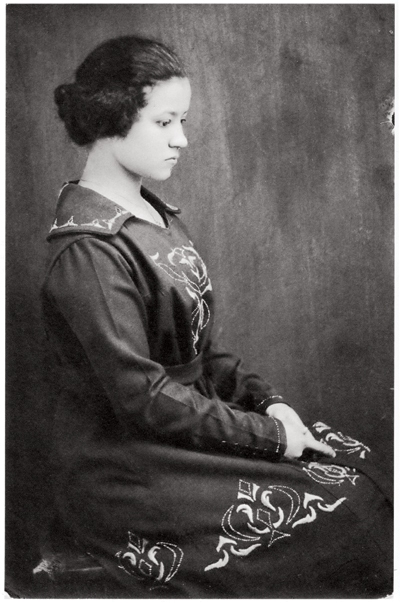
- Self-portrait, early 1920s
- Born: Florestine Marguerite Perrault; January 20, 1895; New Orleans, Louisiana
- Died: April 4, 1988 (aged 93); Los Angeles, California
- Known for: Photography
- Spouse(s): Eilert Bertrand, Herbert W. Collins

Florestine Perrault Collins (January 20, 1895 – April 4, 1988) was an American professional photographer from New Orleans, Louisiana. Collins was known for operating a successful portrait studio in New Orleans that primarily served African American families during the Jim Crow era. She is noted for having created photographs of African-American clients that "reflected pride, sophistication, and dignity" instead of racial stereotypes. She is considered one of the few documented Black women photographers working in the early twentieth century.

Collins specialized in formal studio portraiture, including First Communions, weddings, graduations, and family portraits. Her work has been associated with broader efforts within African American communities to present images of dignity, respectability, and middle class identity during a period of legalized racial segregation.

== Early life ==
Florestine Marguerite Perrault was born on January 20,1895, in New Orleans, Louisiana into a Creole Catholic Family. She was one of six children. Her father worked as a bricklayer, which led to periodic financial instability within the household.

She attended public school only until age six, when she was forced to drop out to help bring in family income. In the early twentieth century, many Black and Creole families in New Orleans relied on the labor of women and children to increase income. Younger girls often worked in domestic service, laundries, or sewing piecework.

Educational opportunities for Black children in New Orleans during this period or limited and underfunded. Catholic parishes played an important role in community live, providing both religious instruction and social structure. Growing up in this environment likely shaped Collins' familiarity with church centered events, which later became a significant part of her studio clientele.

== Career ==
In 1909, Collins began practicing photography at age 14. Her early work included weddings, First Communions, and graduations, and personal photographs of soldiers who had returned home. At the beginning of her career, Collins had to pass as a white woman to be able to assist photographers and to work for the Eastman Kodak Company. According to Arthé A. Anthony, passing gave her access to professional training and employment opportunities that were largely unavailable to Black women under Jim Crow segregation. Anthony explains that working in professional studios exposed Collins to photographic techniques, including lighting, composition, and print development. Access to equipment and training allowed her to develop technical skills that distinguished her later work. These experiences provided knowledge of studio management and client interaction.

In 1917, Collins married Eilert Bertrand, a delivery driver for the Pelican Ice Company. Bertrand reportedly opposed her professional ambitions and attempted to limit her public activities. Despite these restrictions, Perrault continued developing her photography practice

In 1920, Collins began running her own business by taking photographs in her living room. Working within a domestic space allowed her to continue working while meeting social expectations placed on a married woman. In the mid 1930s, she opened her own studio in South Rampart Street, part of the Black business district, catering to African-American families. South Rampart Street was an important commercial area within New Orleans' African American community during the 1930s and 1940s. Collins' studio operated alongside other Black owned businesses, including shops, entertainment venues, and service establishments. Her business continued to operate during the Great Depression, indicating that she was able to maintain steady clientele despite the economy.

Also During World War II, Collins' studio received business from African American servicemen traveling through New Orleans. Many soldiers visited South Rampart Street and paid for formal portraits to be sent to family members. This created a steady demand for studio photography during the war years.

Perrault actively promoted her services through Catholic churches, particularly by marketing First Communion Portraits. She contacted different pastors to obtain the names of communicants and mailed promotional cards to their families. Collins also promoted her studio through newspaper advertisements during the 1920s and 1930s. Her marketing appealed directly to mothers and emphasized the importance of preserving family milestones through photography.

Out of 101 African American women who identified themselves as photographers in the 1920 United States Census, Perrault was the only one listed in New Orleans.

Anthony also describes how Collins ran her studio like a real business, not just a side job. She had helpers and trained young women to assist with studio work and prints. People who worked with her said she expected everyone to act professional and to treat the clients seriously.

In 1927, Collins temporarily relocated to Los Angeles in order to establish residency and to secure a divorce under Louisiana law. While in California, she again passed as white to obtain employment in photography. After divorcing Bertrand, she married Herbert W. Collins in 1928 and continued her professional work under his surname.

Unlike many photographers whose work has been lost, a significant portion of Collin's images has survived, allowing historians to study her contribution to the early twentieth century portrait photography.

Collins remained as a photographer into the 1940s before retiring in 1949. She later returned to New Orleans in 1975.

Collins' professional career spanned nearly four decades, beginning with her early studio training in 1909 and continuing through her own business until 1949. During this period she maintained consistent work despite racial segregation and economic troubles.

== Legacy ==
Collins' photographs have been recognized by historians as an important record of Creole and African American life in the early twentieth century. Since many Black families were excluded from photography in general, her studio portraits now serve as valuable documentation of life, education, religion, and military service during the Jim Crow era. Her photographs provide visual evidence of how African American families chose to present themselves within a segregated society.

Anthony has argued that Collins' portraits were carefully composed to communicate social respectability. Clients were often positioned formally, wearing structured clothing and posed with controlled expressions. Studio backdrops and furnishing contributed to a sense of refinement. These visual elements helped Black communities define themselves on their own terms during a time when national media circulated around degrading stereotypes. Collins' photographs presented a different image centered on family life, faith, and social aspiration.

Scholars have also examined Collins' career as an example of Black female entrepreneurship. Through operating her own studio for several decades, she navigated racial discrimination and gender expectations, while maintaining a stable business. Although she did not receive recognition during her lifetime, now researchers have placed her among the few documented Black women photographers working in the American South.

Anthony has noted that many of Collins' photographs remained in family collections for decades before receiving scholarly attention. Since her work was not exhibited during her lifetime, much of its historical significance became clear later on. The survival of these portraits has allowed historians to better understand everyday life within New Orleans' Black middle class communities.

According to the Encyclopedia of Louisiana, Collins' career "mirrored a complicated interplay of gender, racial and class expectations".

"The history of black liberation in the United States could be characterized as a struggle over images as much as it has also been a struggle over rights," according to bell hooks. Collins' photographs are representative of that. By taking pictures of black women and children in domestic settings, she challenged the pervasive stereotypes of the time about black women.

Collins was featured in the 2014 documentary Through A Lens Darkly: Black Photographers and the Emergence of a People.

Collins' work was included in exhibitions in New Orleans in the late 1900s and early 2000s, such as Women Artists in Louisiana, 1825–1965: A Place of Their Own. She featured in the touring show "The New Woman Behind the Camera," shown at the Metropolitan Museum of Art then the National Gallery of Art, Washington D.C. in 2021 and 2022.

Collins is the subject of the 2013 book Picturing Black New Orleans: A Creole Photographer’s View of the Early Twentieth Century, by Arthé A. Anthony.
