= Johnson Collins =

American politician

- Born: c. 1847; Virginia
- Died: November 3, 1906; Washington, D.C.
- Occupation: Politician
- Years active: 1879–1880

≈

Johnson Collins, also referred to as Collin Collins, (c. 1847–1906) was an American politician, known for representing Brunswick County in the 1879–1880 session of the Virginia General Assembly. Little is concretely known about Collins' early life, but it is known that he was an African-American born in August 1847 in Virginia.

Collins ran for the House of Delegates in 1879 and won by a narrow margin against the incumbent and a third candidate. While serving on the General Assembly Collins served on the Committee on Federal Relations and Resolutions and the Committee on Public Property, and supported a bill sponsored by the Readjustor Harrison H. Riddleberger. Collins did not seek re-election for his position and later moved to Washington, D.C., where he died on November 3, 1906. He was buried at the Columbian Harmony Cemetery but was moved to the National Harmony Memorial Park in the 1960s.

In 2013 Collins was recognized by the state of Virginia and the Martin Luther King Jr. Memorial Commission as one of several African-American that were Senators, Delegates, or members of the Virginia Constitutional Convention between 1867 and 1868.

== See also ==
- African American officeholders from the end of the Civil War until before 1900
