= Mike Collins (Australian footballer, born 1953) =

Australian rules footballer

Personal information
- Full name: Michael Collins
- Born: 5 May 1953 (age 73)
- Original team: Caulfield
- Height: 183 cm (6 ft 0 in)
- Weight: 80 kg (176 lb)

Playing career^{1}
Years	Club	Games (Goals)
1971–1974	Melbourne	27 (11)
- ^{1} Playing statistics correct to the end of 1974.

Michael "Mike" Collins (born 5 May 1953) is a former Australian rules footballer who played with Melbourne in the Victorian Football League (VFL).

Collins, a recruit from Caulfield, played 27 league games for Melbourne, over four seasons. He made a career high 13 appearances in the 1972 VFL season.

In 1975, Collins was traded to South Adelaide, for Colin Graham.
