= William Wiehe Collins =

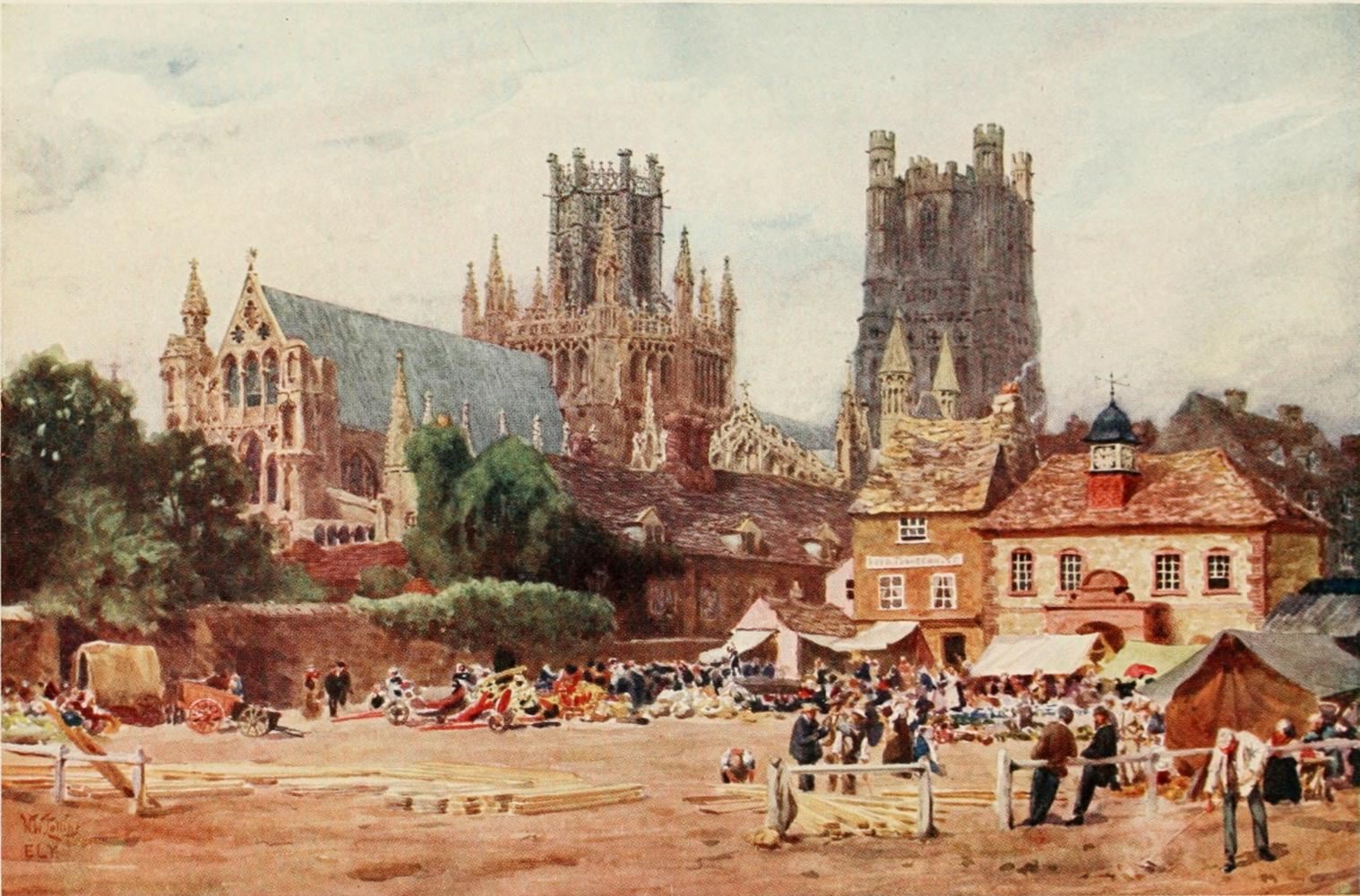
The Market Place, Ely, pencil and watercolour by W W Collins published 1905 showing north-east aspect of Ely Cathedral in the background with the Almonry—now a restaurant and art gallery—in front of that and the now demolished corn exchange building to the right of the picture.

William Wiehe Collins H.R.I. R.B.C. (4 August 1862 – 16 February 1951) was an English architectural and landscape painter, mostly in watercolour. He produced many works that were reproduced in book form.

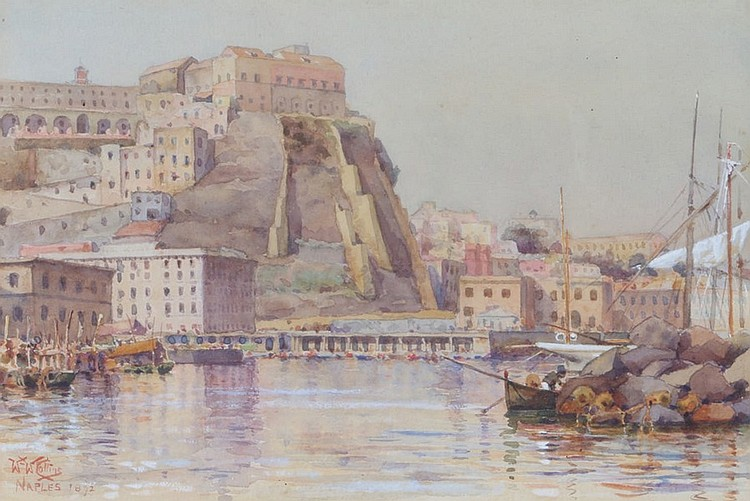
Naples, watercolour, 1892

== Life and work ==
Between 1884 and 1885, Collins studied at the Lambeth School of Art following which he attended the Académie Julian in Paris between 1886 and 1887. From 1886 he exhibited at many of the London galleries including the Royal Academy, Royal Society of British Artists (elected 1906) and the Royal Institution (elected 1898). He served in the Dardanelles and Egypt in the Royal Navy during World War I. He travelled widely producing paintings in England, Spain and Italy.

He died in Cossington, Somerset on 16 February 1951 leaving his wife, Jane.

== Selected works ==
Collins' pencil and watercolour painting The market place, Ely was first exhibited in 1905 and was sold at auction on 19 November 1992 for £715.

- Collins, William Wiehe (1908), Cathedral Cities of England: 60 reproductions from original watercolors, Cleveland, Ohio: J. H. Jansen
- Collins, William Wiehe (1908), The Cathedral Cities of Spain: 60 reproductions from original watercolors
- Collins, William Wiehe (1911), The Cathedral Cities of Italy: 60 reproductions from original watercolors, London: William Heinemann
