= Doug Collins =

Doug Collins may refer to:

- Doug Collins (basketball) (born 1951), American basketball executive and former player, coach, and sports analyst
- Doug Collins (Canadian football) (born 1945), Canadian football player
- Doug Collins (footballer) (born 1945), English former footballer
- Doug Collins (journalist) (1920–2001), Canadian journalist and Holocaust denier
- Doug Collins (politician) (born 1966), U.S. Secretary of Veterans Affairs and former U.S. Representative
