= Neil Collins =

Neil, Neal, or Neill Collins may refer to:

- Neil Collins (speedway rider) (born 1961), English former speedway rider
- Neil Collins (broadcaster) (1941–2018), New Zealand broadcaster and local body politician
- Neil Collins (Gaelic footballer), player for Roscommon GAA
- Neill Collins (born 1983), Scottish footballer
- Neal Collins (politician) (born 1982), member of the South Carolina House of Representatives
