= Hercules Collins =

English Baptist minister and author

Hercules Collins (1647 – 1702) was an English Particular Baptist minister and a prolific author. He was the third minister of London’s oldest Calvinistic Baptist church and is best known for his 1680 revision of the Heidelberg Catechism called An Orthodox Catechism.

== Life ==
Collins had little formal education, but it is recorded that he "began to be religious at an early age." An autodidact, he read multiple substantial theological works, and equipped ministerial candidates and "gifted brothers" in his church with small theological libraries. He served as pastor to the Particular Baptist congregation at Wapping for approximately twenty-five years, and was imprisoned in the infamous Newgate Prison (1683-1684). He died on 4 October 1702, and his funeral sermon, by the Rev. John Piggott, was printed in the following year.

== Works ==
His published material begins with An Orthodox Catechism (1680), an edited version of the 16th century Heidelberg Catechism. Collins revised the section on baptism, as well as making a number of stylistic changes; he also defends the practice of the laying on of hands upon the newly baptized. Collins added the text of the Nicene Creed and Athanasian Creed to An Orthodox Catechism in an attempt to demonstrate Particular Baptist orthodoxy and defend their churches from false charges of anabaptistic heresies. In the “Appendix on Singing,” he argues for the biblical duty of congregational singing.

Over the next twenty-two years Collins produced eleven more works, mainly on issues of separation from the Church of England, and believer's baptism versus infant baptism. Other works come from his time in Newgate Prison during 1684. One of these was Counsel for the Living Occasioned from the Dead and was written on the death of two of his fellow prisoners; it contains pastoral instruction to those who were likewise experiencing persecution. The other, A Voice from Prison, was alternatively titled: Meditations on Revelation 3:11 Tending to the Establishment of God’s Little Flock, in An Hour of Temptation. Collins was also well-known for his “Mountains of Brass,” a lecture on the decrees of God.

His final work was The Temple Repair'd (1702). It includes instruction on preparing and preaching sermons for those in the ministry, and treats the doctrine of the “gifted brother” throughout. The Temple Repair'd contains Collins's only extant sermon.

Collins also wrote the following works, some of which occasioned a good deal of controversy:

- An Orthodox Catechism, being the sum of Christian Religion contained in the Law and Gospel, London, 1680, 12mo.
- A Voice from the Prison, or Meditations on Revelations, London, 1684, 4to.
- Believers' Baptism from Heaven, and of Divine Institution Infants' Baptism from Earth, and Human Invention, London, 1691, 8vo., revised and republished by John Bailey, London, 1803, 8vo.
- The Antidote proved a Counterfeit, or Error detected, and Believers' Baptism vindicated, containing an answer to "An Antidote to prevent the Prevalency of Anabaptism," London, 1693, 4to.
- Three books, viz. I. The Scribe instructed unto the Kingdom of Heaven. II. Mountains of Brass, or a Discourse upon the Decrees of God. III. A poem on the Birth, Life, Death, Resurrection, and Ascension of Jesus Christ. 3 parts, London, 1696, 12mo.

Collins additionally was an endorser of The Gospel Minister's Maintenance Vindicated (London, 1689); and following the tragic case of John Child's suicide, contributed extensively to (and likely edited) an account of Child's final days entitled The English Spira (London, 1693).

His collected Works are presently being edited by Mark Smith and Reagan Marsh for Hesed & Emet Publishers (H&E) under the oversight of Dr. Michael A. G. Haykin. Smith maintains a website (http://www.vor.org/rbdisk/other.htm) featuring transcriptions of Collins’s Works. Marsh, founding pastor-teacher of Reformation Baptist Church in Dalton, GA, has also recently written a thesis on Collins's pastoral theology under Dr. Thomas J. Nettles.

The definitive work on Hercules Collins to date is the dissertation (SBTS, 2013) by Dr. G. Stephen Weaver. His Orthodox, Puritan, Baptist: Hercules Collins (1647-1702) and Particular Baptist Identity in Early Modern England was published by Vandenhoeck & Ruprecht in 2015. Weaver has contributed chapters on Collins's thought to several books, and produced several journal articles on Collins as well.
