= Ronald Collins =

Ronald Collins may refer to:

- Ronald K. L. Collins (born 1949), American scholar and lawyer
- Ronald F. Collins, Maine politician
- Ron Collins (curler) (Ronald Stewart Collins, Jr., 1956–2016), Canadian curler
- Ron Collins Jr (born 1971), American football player

== See also ==
- Rum Collins, also known as a Ron Collins, a rum-based version of the Tom Collins cocktail
