= Gary Collins =

Gary Collins may refer to:

- Gary Collins (ice hockey) (1935–2022), Canadian ice hockey player
- Gary Collins (actor) (1938–2012), American actor and television host
- Gary Collins (American football) (born 1940), American football player
- Gary Collins (Idaho politician) (1942–2023), American politician
- Gary Collins (baseball coach) (born 1947), American baseball coach
- Gary Collins (racing driver) (born 1960), American stock car racing driver
- Gary Collins (Canadian politician) (born 1963), Canadian politician

== See also ==
- Gary Collins-Simpson (born 1961), Canadian swimmer
