= James L. Collins =

American businessman

James L. Collins (1883–1953) was an American businessman and philanthropist. Collins grew up in Weston, West Virginia.

In the early 1920s, he formed a partnership with R.L. Wheelock in Corsicana, Texas.

Collins worked in the petroleum industry. He eventually won an election as an officer of the Mid-Continental Oil and Gas industry Association and of the Independent Petroleum Association of America, and worked as director of Corsicana's First National Bank.

After his death in Corsicana, Texas in 1953, Collins' estate was donated to four major charities. these were a namesake parochial school, The Texas Scottish Rite Hospital for Crippled Children, St. Joseph's Orphanage of Dallas, and a scholarship fund to help graduates of Corsicana High School attend college.

The James L. Collins Elementary School, as of the 2023-2024 school year, has 138 students. The local college scholarship also continues to be awarded yearly to a few dozen students.
