= Ray Collins =

Ray or Raymond Collins may refer to:

- Ray Collins (baseball) (1887–1970), American pitcher in Major League Baseball
- Ray Collins (actor) (1889–1965), American actor
- Raymond J. Collins (1897–1965), New Zealand philatelist
- Raymond Collins (Kentucky politician) (1911–1994), American politician, member of the Kentucky House of Representatives
- Ray Collins (American football) (1927–1991), American football defensive tackle
- Ray Collins (cartoonist) (1931–2021), American cartoonist
- Raymond Collins (priest) (born 1935), American Roman Catholic priest and theologian
- Ray Collins (musician) (1936–2012), American singer
- Ray Collins, Baron Collins of Highbury (born 1954), British trade unionist and politician
- Raymond Collins, character in Ravenswood

== See also ==
- Raymond Collings (1908–1973), British bobsledder
