= Lee Collins =

Lee Collins may refer to:

- Lee Collins (footballer, born 1974), Scottish former footballer
- Lee Collins (footballer, born 1977), English former footballer
- Lee Collins (footballer, born 1988) (1988–2021), English footballer
- Lee Collins (musician) (1901–1960), American jazz musician
- Lee Collins (Unicode), software engineer, co-creator of Unicode

== See also ==
- Justin Lee Collins (born 1974), British comedian
