= Peter Collins (academic) =

British academic

Peter Collins (born 4 March 1945) is a British academic who most recently worked at the University of Salford.

== Early life ==
Educated at Harrow School, he obtained an Open Scholarship to Christ Church, Oxford where he studied between 1963 and 1966 obtaining BA Hons (Second Class) in modern languages; followed by an MA (Oxon) in 1968. He studied for a second bachelor's degree at the University of London between 1969 and 1971 obtaining a first class BA Hons in philosophy in 1971. He returned to Oxford for his BPhil and Doctorate.

== Academic career ==
After an early career as assistant master at Dulwich College, which he combined with his second bachelor's degree, he became lecturer/ senior lecturer in philosophy at Westminster College, Oxford and philosophy a tutor at the Open University between 1972 and 1975. In 1976 he moved to the University of Cape Town where he forged his academic career with periods within the departments of philosophy, political studies and management. In 1999 he was appointed associate professor of management, becoming director for the Centre for the Study of Gambling. In 2000 he joined the University of Salford as director for Centre for the Study of Gambling and Commercial Gaming, and senior lecturer. He was appointed professor of public policy studies in 2002 and became an academic within Salford Business School.

He is the author of the book Gambling and the Public Interest and has been an adviser on gambling policy to governments in South Africa, Gibraltar, Jersey, the UK and Singapore.

He has four published books, eight chapters in books and numerous refereed journal articles, covering philosophy, politics and gambling.

== Advisory and consultancy work ==
As project leader and principal author of the South African National and International Academic Research Project on Gambling and Public Policy, he was responsible for the various research and reports between 1995 and 1999 which was sponsored by both the public and private Sectors in South Africa. In 1999 he was appointed as a part-time Executive Director for the South African National Responsible Gambling Programme. After his move to the UK he became an adviser on casino matters to the Joint Scrutiny Committee to the House of Lords and the House of Commons which considered the new UK gambling act.

He has appeared as a keynote speaker at international conferences on gambling.
