= Nick Collins (English footballer) =

English footballer (1911–1990)

Personal information
- Date of birth: 7 September 1911
- Place of birth: Chopwell, England
- Date of death: 1990 (aged 78–79)
- Height: 5 ft 8 in (1.73 m)
- Position: Defender

Senior career*
Years	Team	Apps	(Gls)
1930–1931	Ashford Town		
?–1934	Canterbury Waverley		
1934–1946	Crystal Palace	146	(7)
1946–?	Yeovil Town		
- * Club domestic league appearances and goals

Nicholas Collins (7 September 1911 – 1990) was an English professional footballer who played as a defender. He made over 100 Football League appearances for Crystal Palace and also played non-league football for Ashford Town, Canterbury Waverley and Yeovil Town.

== Career ==
Collins began his career in non-league football with Kent League clubs Ashford Town and Canterbury Waverly F.C. In 1934 he signed for Crystal Palace then playing in the Football League Third Division South. He made his debut in September, in an away defeat to Brighton and went on to make 20 appearances that season, scoring three times. Over the subsequent four seasons, Collins made 23 appearances (no goals), 31 appearances (one goal), 36 appearances (two goals) and 33 appearances (one goal) respectively. In the 1939–40 season, Collins made three appearances before regular league football was suspended due to World War II. Collins went on to play Wartime League football for Palace between 1939 and 1942. In 1946, Collins moved on to Yeovil Town.

== Personal life ==
Collins died in 1990, aged 78 or 79.
