= Phil Collins (disambiguation) =

Phil Collins (born 1951) is an English musician with the rock band Genesis.

Phil or Philip Collins may also refer to:

== Sports ==
- Phil Collins (baseball) (1901–1948), American baseball player
- Phil Collins (speedway rider) (born 1960), English international motorcycle racer
- Phillip Collins (cyclist) (born 1972), Irish Olympic cyclist

== Others ==
- Philip Collins (journalist) (born 1967), British journalist
- Phil Collins (artist) (born 1970), British photographer and artist
- Phil Collins (politician) (born 1967), American politician
- Philip R. Collins, proprietor of Barometer World in Devon, England
- Philadelphia "Phil" Collins, character in the Trailer Park Boys

== See also ==
- Phil Collen (born 1957), lead guitarist for Def Leppard
- Phil Collinson (born 1970), British television producer
