= Lewis Collins (disambiguation) =

Lewis Collins (1946–2013) was an English actor.

Lewis Collins may also refer to:

- Lewis Collins (RAF officer) (1894–1971), British World War I flying ace
- Lewis Collins (footballer) (born 2001), Welsh footballer
- Lewis Preston Collins II (1896–1952), Lieutenant Governor of Virginia
- Lewis D. Collins (1899–1954), American film director

== See also ==
- Lewis Collens, president of the Illinois Institute of Technology from 1990 to 2007
