= Maurice Collins =

Maurice Collins may refer to:

- Maurice Collins (judge), Irish judge
- Maurice Collins (politician) (1878–1945), Australian politician
- Mardy Collins (born 1984), American professional basketball player
