= Barrie Collins =

Barrie Munro Collins is a researcher, PhD holder, and writer for Living Marxism and Spiked whose revisionist views on the Rwandan genocide have led to accusations of Rwandan genocide denial. On the other hand, René Lemarchand, credited him with "the most tightly argued, well documented and provocative challenge to the conventional wisdom".

== Works ==
- Collins, Barrie (1998). Obedience in Rwanda: A Critical Question. Sheffield Hallam University Press. ISBN 978-0-86339-778-3.
- Collins, Barrie (2002). "New Wars and Old Wars? The Lessons of Rwanda". Rethinking Human Rights: Critical Approaches to International Politics. Palgrave Macmillan UK. pp. 157–175. ISBN 978-1-4039-1426-2.
- Collins, Barrie Munro (2009). The Rwandan war 1990-94 : interrogating the dominant narrative (PhD thesis). School of Oriental and African Studies (University of London).
- Collins, Barrie (2014). Rwanda 1994: The Myth of the Akazu Genocide Conspiracy and its Consequences. Springer. ISBN 978-1-137-02232-5.
