= Gordon Collins =

English cricketer

Personal information
- Full name: Gordon Thomas Collins
- Born: 26 December 1914; Sunbury-on-Thames, Middlesex, England
- Died: 3 March 1986 (aged 71); Manchester, England
- Batting: Right-handed
- Role: Occasional wicketkeeper

Domestic team information
- Years: Team
- 1947–1949: Cambridgeshire
- 1938: Northamptonshire

Career statistics
Competition	First-class
Matches	3
Runs scored	44
Batting average	8.80
100s/50s	–/–
Top score	17
Balls bowled	–
Wickets	–
Bowling average	–
5 wickets in innings	–
10 wickets in match	–
Best bowling	–
Catches/stumpings	–/–
- Source: Cricinfo, 20 July 2010

Gordon Thomas Collins (26 December 1914 – 3 March 1986) was an English cricketer. Collins was a right-handed batsman who played occasionally as a wicketkeeper. He was born at Sunbury-on-Thames, Middlesex.

Collins made his first-class cricket debut for Northamptonshire against Worcestershire in 1937. He represented the county in 2 further first-class matches in 1937, against Derbyshire and Essex. In his 3 first-class matches, he scored 44 runs at a batting average of 8.80, with a high score of 17.

In 1947, he joined Cambridgeshire, where he represented the county in the Minor Counties Championship, making his debut for the county against Norfolk. From 1947 to 1949, he represented the county in 9 matches, with his final appearance coming against Lincolnshire.

Collins died at Manchester on 3 March 1986.
