= William Collins (cricketer, born 1868) =

English cricketer

Personal information
- Full name: William Ronald Collins
- Born: 29 January 1868; Hackney, Middlesex, England
- Died: 10 December 1942 (aged 74); Thrapston, Northamptonshire, England
- Batting: Right-handed
- Bowling: Right-arm fast

Domestic team information
- Years: Team
- 1892: Middlesex

Career statistics
Competition	First-class
Matches	1
Runs scored	0
Batting average	0.00
100s/50s	–/–
Top score	0
Balls bowled	–
Wickets	–
Bowling average	–
5 wickets in innings	–
10 wickets in match	–
Best bowling	–
Catches/stumpings	–/–
- Source: Cricinfo, 8 February 2013

William Ronald Collins (29 January 1868 – 10 December 1942) was an English cricketer. Collins was a right-handed batsman who bowled right-arm fast. He was born at Hackney, Middlesex and was educated at Wellington College.

Collins made a single first-class appearance for Middlesex in the 1892 County Championship against Somerset at the County Ground, Taunton. He was dismissed twice in the match for ducks, firstly by Coote Hedley in Middlesex's first-innings and then by George Nichols in their second.

He died at Thrapston, Northamptonshire on 10 December 1942.
