= Leslie Collins =

American electrical engineer

Leslie M. Collins is an American electrical engineer specializing in signal processing, and known for her research on topics including the use of ground-penetrating radar to detect land mines, and the performance of cochlear implants. She is a professor of electrical and computer engineering at Duke University, where she also holds an appointment in the Department of Head and Neck Surgery & Communication Sciences, and directs the Applied Machine Learning Lab.

== Education and career ==
Collins studied electrical engineering at the University of Kentucky, earning a bachelor's degree in 1985, and went on for a master's degree at the University of Michigan in 1986. After working for five years as an engineer for the Westinghouse Electric Corporation, she returned to the University of Michigan for a Ph.D., completed in 1995.

She has been a faculty member at Duke University since 1995, initially as an assistant professor. She was tenured as an associate professor in 2002 and promoted to full professor in 2007.

== Recognition ==
Collins was named an IEEE Fellow, in the 2024 class of fellows, "for contributions to signal processing algorithms for auditory applications and to buried threat detection".
