= Tom Collins (dual player) =

Irish hurler and Gaelic footballer

Personal information
- Born: Kilmoyley, County Kerry, Ireland

Sport
- Football Position: Forward
- Hurling Position: Forward
Club
- Years: Club
- Kilmoyley
Club titles
	Football	Hurling
Kerry titles	0	3
Inter-county
- Years: County
- Kerry (F); Kerry (H)
Inter-county titles
	Football	Hurling
Munster Titles	2	1 Junior
All-Ireland Titles	1	1 Junior
League titles	2	0
All-Stars	0	0

Tom Collins was a dual player from County Kerry, Ireland. He played hurling with Kerry and Kilmoyley and football with Kerry and St Brendans.

== Playing career ==
Club hurling

Collins won every domestic hurling honour available with Kilmoyley. Winning Kerry Senior Hurling Championships in 1962, 1963, 1964 and playing in losing finals in 1955, 1956, 1958.

Club football

Tom was a mainstay of the St Brendans district team for many years, playing in several county senior football finals, and winning a Kerry Minor Football Championship with the division in 1953.

Inter-county hurling

Tom was part of the Kerry team that won the All-Ireland Junior Hurling Championship in 1961 beating London in the final.

Intercounty football

He won an All Ireland Senior Medal with Kerry in 1959 as a member of the panel. He also won an All-Ireland Junior Football Championship Medal in 1954. He won National Football League Medals in 1953 and 1959.

== Place in history ==
In 1956, Collins earned a place in GAA history by playing in three Munster Finals in one day. He played corner forward with the Junior Hurlers as they beat Waterford 6–07 to 0–03, then again in the corner for the Junior Footballers as they also beat Waterford 4–10 to 1–04, however he could not make it 3 out of 3 as he came on as a sub in the replayed Munster Senior Football Championship Final only for Kerry to go down to Cork by 1–08 to 1–07.
