= Joseph Collins =

Joseph Collins may refer to:

- Joseph Henry Collins (1841–1916), British mining engineer
- Joseph Collins (1847–1833), English boxer, who competed as Tug Wilson (boxer)
- Joseph Collins (neurologist) (1866–1950), American neurologist
- J. Lawton Collins (1896–1987), U.S. Army general
- Joseph Collins (boxer) (1919–1984), New Zealand boxer
- Joseph T. Collins (1939–2012), American herpetologist
- Joe Collins (1922–1989), baseball player
- "Joe Collins", pseudonym of Australian Albert Collins (painter) (1883–1951)
- Joe Collins (American football), American football player for the University of Notre Dame, 1908–1909
- Joseph Collins (American football) (born 1988), American football wide receiver
