= Max Collins =

Max Collins may refer to:

- Max Collins (musician) (born 1978), American musician
- Max Allan Collins (born 1948), American mystery writer
- Max Collins (actress) (born 1992), Filipino American actress and model
- Max Collins (Vanished character)
