= Michael Collins (rugby union, born 1986) =

Welsh rugby union player

Michael Collins (born 21 July 1986) is a rugby union player for the Ospreys in the Celtic League, who plays as a lock.
