= Shane Collins =

Shane Collins may refer to:

- Shane Collins (American football) (born 1969), former defensive end in the National Football League
- Shane Collins (field hockey) (born 1963), former field hockey player from New Zealand
