= Nancy Walbridge Collins =

N. W. Collins
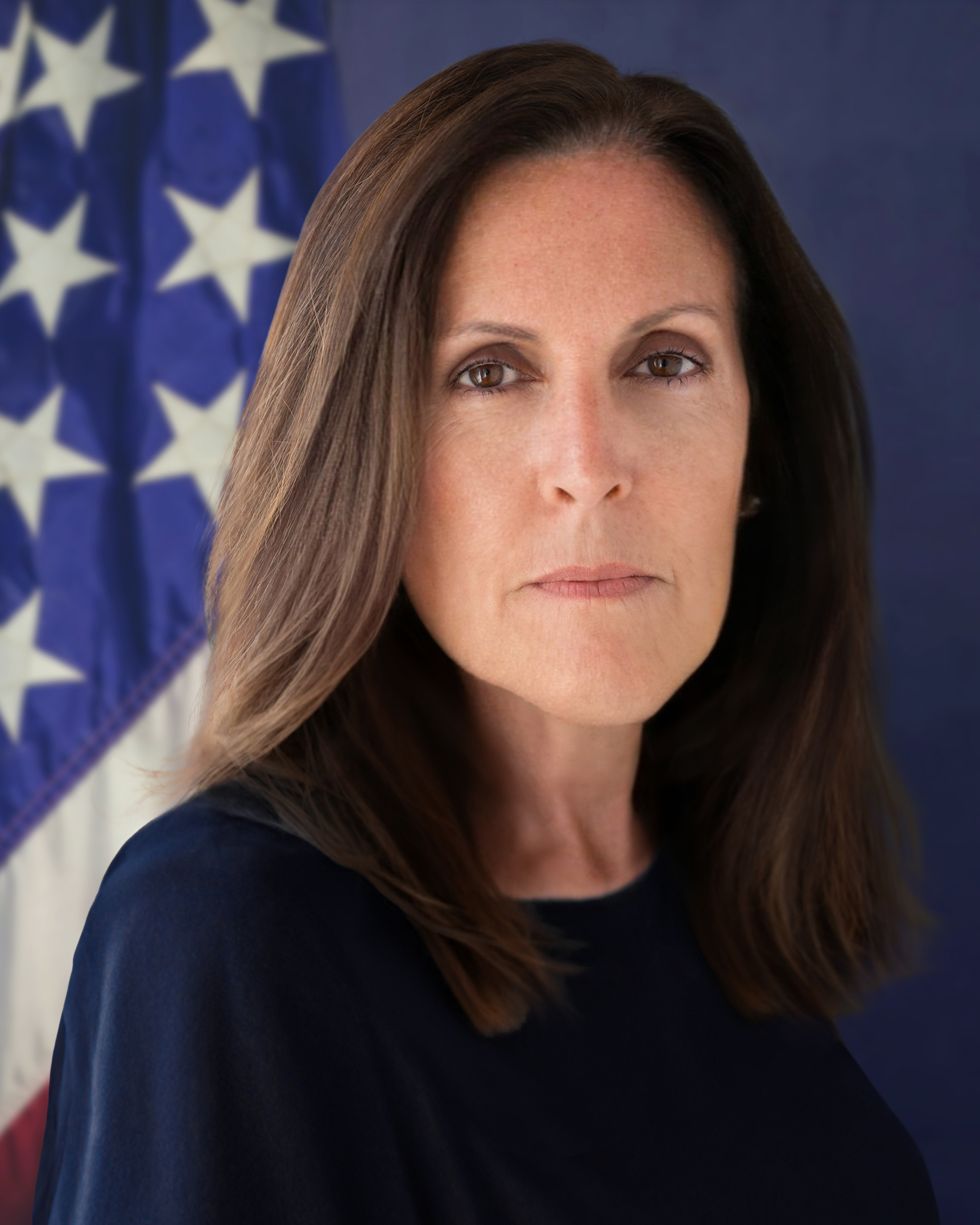
- Born: February 2, 1973 (age 53)
- Occupation: Academic | Author | Investor
- Years active: 1992–present
- Organization: Yale University | Apollo Group
- Known for: Public Leadership

Nancy Walbridge Collins is dedicated to global markets and public leadership, undertaking her first assignment in 1992.

She is a senior fellow of Yale University and former DSS chair of Columbia University. She is the author of Grey Wars (Yale University Press, 2021, and 2024). Her essays and commentaries appear in a range of publications, including Forbes, The New York Times, TIME, U.S. News & World Report, and The Wall Street Journal. One project, Olympics Eternal, considers the global mission of the games. Two series, American Futures and Alpha Capital, analyze accelerating investments and strategic technology.

Dr. Collins served as a senior advisor in the U.S. Department of Defense and joint agencies from 2010-2026, focused on national mission priorities and technology investments. She oversaw programs, activities, and special projects with the intelligence community and special operations forces. Dr. Collins served as a senior fellow at West Point from 2020-2022 and was a member of the U.S. Commission on Military History from 2009-2025. She is the chair of Apollo Group, a macro investment fund, and a member of the Council on Foreign Relations since 2009.

== Education ==
She received a B.A. in government from Georgetown University in 1995 and returned as a senior fellow from 2014-2017. Collins completed an M.A. and Ph.D. from the University of London (UCL) and doctoral and postdoctoral fellowships at Yale University. She graduated from the Loomis Chaffee School and served on its Board of Trustees for a decade.

== Awards ==
N. W. Collins has been awarded fellowships and grants, from among others, the University of Chicago, Harvard University, the Rockefeller Foundation, the Wilson Center, and Yale University. She is a recipient of the U.S. Congressional Dirksen Award and the NCAFP 21st Century Leadership Award.

== Publications ==
- Grey Wars: A Contemporary History of U.S. Special Operations (Yale University Press, 2021). Book
- The Streets of Mogadishu (Yale University Press, 2024). Essay
- The Atlantic Imperative (Atlantic Council, 2021). Essay
- Patriotism, Security Strategies, & The Rising Generation, FOX NEWS, July 6, 2013. Article
- “National Responsibility from Abbottabad to Patriots’ Day,” with M. Malvesti, CNN, May 1, 2013. Article
- “NATO Is Not Enough: The Seven-Continent Strategy,” New York Times, April 23, 2013. Article
- “The Bell Tolls for the U.S. Military,” TIME Magazine, March 26, 2013. Essay
- “Sequestration Imperatives: Creating 21st Century Force,” U.S. News & World Report,” with M. McGuire IV, March 25, 2013. Article
- “The Unintended Consequences of Highly Sensitive Information Disclosure,” with M. Malvesti, Forbes, February 5, 2013. Article
- ""No Easy Day"" Meets Pentagon Hardball," The Wall Street Journal, July 9, 2014. Article
