= Mary Collins (missionary) =

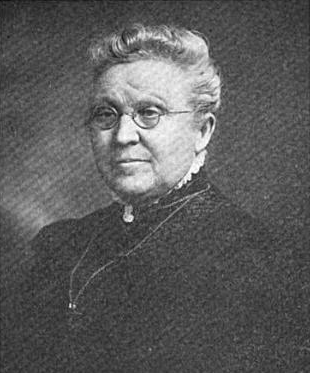
- Reverend Mary C. Collins
- Born: Mary Clementine Collins; April 18, 1846; Alton, Illinois
- Died: May 25, 1920 (aged 74); Keokuk, Iowa

Mary Collins (April 18, 1846 - May 25, 1920) was a missionary, writer, and proponent for Native American rights in the Dakota Territory of the United States of America. She was a prolific member of the American Missionary Association, having spent thirty-five years of her life living amongst the Sioux tribe acting as a teacher, translator, and diplomat between the Sioux and white settlers. She was a noted friend and correspondent of Sitting Bull, one of the most famous Native Americans in United States history. Despite her actions and lifelong commitment to peaceful relations with the Sioux, Collins is a relatively unknown character in American history.

== Early life ==
Mary Clementine Collins was born in 1846 to Ephraim and Margaret Collins, in the town of Upper Alton, Illinois. Her father was a Northerner, and her mother a Southerner. Both her parents were children of American Revolutionary War veterans. Collins credited her ancestry, along with the physical training of her brothers, with providing her with the "pioneer spirit" that came to define her life. She rode horses, boated, climbed trees, and lifted weights alongside her brothers.

At the age of two, Collins moved with her family to Keokuk, Iowa, a small town in the southeastern part of the state. Keokuk was known for its neutrality between White and Native settlers. Here she attended a mix of public and private schools on her way to receiving a Master of Arts from Ripon College in Wisconsin.

Collins' religious training and interest in missionary work began at an early age, when she began attending church and Sabbath School. In her publication How I Became A Missionary, Collins states that her Sabbath school teacher introduced her to and trained her for her future calling.

== Life with the Sioux ==
Collins was first called to missionary work in 1875 by the American Board of Commissioners for Foreign Missions. She wished to work in the Micronesia island territories in the western Pacific Ocean, but she failed to pass the required medical exam because of a lung condition. She was asked instead to serve as a missionary to the Native Americans in the Dakota territory, arriving at her post on November 10, 1875.

Collins was quick to adapt to the language, claiming she had no trouble in seeing the Native American side of any question. She enjoyed a relatively high status amongst the tribe due to her knowledge of medicine, which gave her privileges not typically granted. She was also a source of counsel and knowledge on domestic affairs, religious problems, and legal questions. During her time on the Reservation, she also served as a lecturer on behalf of the Native American way of life at universities, public schools, churches, and conferences.

=== Friendship with Sitting Bull ===
Sitting Bull, the tribal chief of the Lakota Sioux at the end of the 19th century, was introduced to Collins some time in 1885 (nine years after his victory at the Battle of Little Bighorn). She impressed him almost immediately with her command of the Lakota language, and for this he considered her a relative.

American historian and biographer Stanley Vestal states in his biography Sitting Bull: Champion of the Sioux that Collins "knew him better than almost any other white person at the agency." Her close relationship with Sitting Bull, along with her quest for peaceful cooperation between both Natives and the expanding white settlements, led her to ask Sitting Bull to stop encouraging the Ghost Dance, which was believed to have contributed to Lakota resistance. This dance was seen as a threat by U.S. Army troops and policemen sent to the Dakota region, who misinterpreted the dance as a prelude to armed attack. Sitting Bull and his tribe persisted, and on December 15, 1890, Sitting Bull was arrested, and subsequently shot and killed in the ensuing mayhem. Following the Wounded Knee Massacre later that month, the practice of Ghost Dancing was outlawed.

== Death and legacy ==
In 1910, failing health compelled Collins to give up her work in the field with the Sioux. She returned to Keokuk to live with her sister (there is no evidence that Collins ever married). Illness set in during the early summer of 1919, and confined Collins to her bed until her death in 1920.

In Keokuk, she had continued to be an active member of the American Missionary Association. Her writings, many of them in the Dakota language, remained an important part of Dakota culture long after her death. Frank White, a representative of the American Missionary Association, paid tribute to her life by characterizing her as "pioneer in the nth power." Many of her correspondences, including her own autobiography and will, are held in the South Dakota State Historical Society.
