= Albert Collins (disambiguation) =

Albert Collins (1932–1993) was an American blues musician.

Albert Collins may also refer to:

- Albert Collins (footballer) (1899–1969), English footballer
- Albert Collins (painter) (1883–1951), Australian painter, teacher and actor
- Albert Collins (politician) (1868–1956), New South Wales politician
- Al "Jazzbo" Collins (1919–1997), American disc jockey
- Albert Collins, co-composer with Richard Penniman of the song Lucille
