= Kevin Collins (footballer) =

Australian rules footballer

Personal information
- Full name: Ronald Kevin Collins
- Born: 9 April 1922
- Died: 1 December 2007 (aged 85)
- Original team: Sandringham
- Height: 178 cm (5 ft 10 in)
- Weight: 80 kg (176 lb)

Playing career^{1}
Years	Club	Games (Goals)
1948–49	South Melbourne	12 (12)
- ^{1} Playing statistics correct to the end of 1949.

Ronald Kevin Collins (9 April 1922 – 1 December 2007) was an Australian rules footballer who played with South Melbourne in the Victorian Football League (VFL).
