= Darnell Collins =

American spree killer (1962–1995)

- Born: Mwanza Atiba Kamau; April 5, 1962; New York City, U.S.
- Died: June 21, 1995 (aged 33); Nutley, New Jersey, U.S.
- Cause of death: Gunshot wound
- Other names: "Mad Dog Killer" "The Killing Odyssey"

Details
- Span of crimes: June 17 – 21, 1995
- Country: United States
- States: New Jersey, New York
- Killed: 7
- Injured: 3
- Weapon: 6-shot .22-caliber Smith & Wesson revolver

Mwanza Atiba Kamau (April 5, 1962 – June 21, 1995), better known as Darnell Collins, was an American recidivist and spree killer who shot and killed seven people and wounded three others in New Jersey and New York over four days in June 1995. The spree came to an end once Collins was surrounded by law enforcement in Nutley, New Jersey, who promptly killed him.

== Early life ==
Collins was born in New York City on April 5, 1962. Since his father was killed during the Vietnam War, Collins was raised by his mother in Atlantic City, New Jersey. At age nine, Collins was temporarily sent to a juvenile detention center for assault, shoplifting, larceny, and attempted arson. After an uncertain amount of time confined, he was released, but returned after another assault conviction in 1975.

In 1984, Collins was detained for six crimes committed in New Jersey. This subsequently led to convictions on armed robbery and burglary, and Collins was sentenced to 20 years in prison. He was paroled on January 11, 1994, after serving ten years in prison. In August he was detained after testing positive for drugs but was not prosecuted. Soon after, he met 30-year-old April Gates, a blackjack dealer at the Golden Nugget Casino in Atlantic City. The two eventually began a relationship but separated in January 1995.

== Murders ==
=== New Jersey ===
In June 1995, Gates reported Collins to the police after witnessing him violate his parole, which apparently angered Collins to the point that the two got into a domestic dispute. On June 15, a judge issued a restraining order on Collins, halting him from seeing Gates. Enraged by the decision, on June 17, Collins, armed with a long-barreled six-shot .22-caliber Smith & Wesson revolver, went to Gates' home in Atlantic City, but the only one home was her mother, 51-year-old Shirley Gates. Instead, he tied up Shirley and shot her two times, once above the ear and the other below, fatally injuring her. Afterwards he stuffed her body in the back of his car and drove three blocks down to the house of Alicia Chappell, where April Gates was partying for her friend's birthday.

Once outside, Collins entered and located Gates, who was sitting in a chair, and she promptly called him out. Collins walked over and, to the horror of party guests, shot Gates once in the ear, then two times in the stomach, knocking her to the ground. Afterwards, Collins reportedly yelled out "Why'd you tell!?", but by that time, Gates was already presumed dead. Collins fled to Gates' vehicle and drove 30-miles to Monroe Township. He ended up sheltering in the Star Motel on Black Horse Pike. There, on June 18, he broke into the room of 41-year-old William Dawson and 27-year-old Stacey Smith, and Smith's 4-year-old son. Upon entering, Collins fatally shot Dawson once in the chest, and shot Smith once in the neck, and left her 4-year-old son unharmed. Smith survived her gunshot wound, and was rushed to Cooper Hospital University Medical Center in Camden, New Jersey, ultimately recovering from her injuries. The next day, Collins entered a gas station in Haddon Township, where he pistol whipped the attendant in the face and robbed the place of $854.

=== New York ===
Collins' spree had alarmed outer-state police forces and authorities in New York feared he might have been sheltering there. New Jersey officials contacted the New York Police Department (NYPD) and informed them that Collins might be hiding with his aunt in her home in Harlem. However, once seized and searched upon, this theory was proven to be untrue. On June 19, Collins approached 38-year-old gas station attendant Jose Gabriel Escarpetta in the parking lot near the Avenue of the Americas. He demanded money, but after refusing to cooperate, Collins shot Escarpetta three times, killing him. At the time, Escarpetta was being investigated in the drug related murder of his brother, but he was eventually cleared of suspicion following his murder.

Following the murder of Escarpetta, Collins fled on foot to a nearby building and took the elevator to the ninth floor. Upon this, he encountered two men, 26-year-old Jeffrey Roork and 54-year-old David Roth, who both worked at the building. As the elevator rose, Collins shot both men in the head, killing both immediately. Once again needing to flee, he left the building and wound up on East 126th Street in Harlem, where he shot Norma Acosta in the head, but she survived her injuries. Less than an hour later, Collins approached two men, 46-year-old Rev. Robert Gethers and deacon Joseph Johnson outside of their church. Collins demanded money from Johnson, but he did not have any, so he resorted to Gethers, who handed him $350 from his wallet. Because of this, Collins spared both men and fled in their car. On June 21, Collins hitched a ride from a taxi. For unknown reasons, through the ride, Collins shot the driver Emmanuel Malan in the head, killing him.

== Climax and death ==
Collins' car after crashing in Clifton

Hours after the final murder, a woman from Newark, New Jersey called the police claiming that three men were wielding guns outside her house, threatening a woman. In an unexpected turn, while on the way there police noticed Collins in a white vehicle. Reportedly, he had nothing to do with the three men, and it is believed it was a stroke of luck he was spotted.

Upon spotting the cops, Collins attempted to drive away unnoticed, but police were in pursuit. Throughout the subsequent 20-minute car chase, the police lost sight of him once, before the Belleville police re-spotted him. Collins shot at the police multiple times, missing his shots. Once near Washington Avenue, he attempted to turn onto Kingsland Street, but hit an embankment. He attempted to careen his car but crashed it into a house, and since it was too damaged to keep going, Collins fled on foot.

He was spotted by police and took cover behind a half-wall on a house's property. He and officers began taking shots at one-another, but no one was hurt in the pursuit. Collins once again attempted to flee to another spot, but was again spotted, and ran down a riverside and positioned himself on his back in the shallow water, and re-loaded his gun, before resuming taking shots at the officers. In the ensuing gun battle, Collins was struck by 14 bullets, knocking him unconscious. Not long after, Collins was finally pronounced dead by the subsequent paramedics who responded.

== Aftermath ==
Upon the end of Collins' spree, questions began to be raised about his parole officer John Goodman and why he didn't take action in response to Collins' parole violations, as Collins was considered a dangerous criminal and habitual re-offender. This led to allegations that Goodman had neglected his position, and after undergoing an administrative hearing on October 19, the court agreed and Goodman was stripped of his position in January 1996.

== See also ==
- List of rampage killers
