= Tim Collins =

Tim Collins may refer to:

- Tim Collins (equestrian) (born 1975), Bermudian Olympic equestrian
- Tim Collins (financier) (born 1956), American businessman and financier
- Tim Collins (politician) (born 1964), British MP for Westmorland and Lonsdale, 1997–2005
- Tim Collins (British Army officer) (born 1960), lieutenant colonel in the British army in the 2003 Iraq war
- Tim Collins (manager), former manager for the band Aerosmith
- Tim Collins (baseball) (born 1989), Major League Baseball pitcher
- Tim Collins (footballer) (1889–1971), Australian rules footballer
- Tim Collins (Neighbours), fictional character on the Australian soap opera Neighbours
- Tim Collins (golfer) (1945–2012), American professional golfer

== See also ==
- Tim Collin
