= John Baptist Collins =

John Baptist Collins (died July 30, 1794) was a would-be French pirate who, with Emanuel Furtado and Augustus Palacha, attempted to seize control of the brigantine Betty bound for Boston, Massachusetts.

Born in France, Collins went to sea at age sixteen as a cooper's apprentice on a Dutch ship. He was later sold to the East India Company where, during a voyage to the Cape of Good Hope, he met sailors Emanuel Furtado and Augustus Palacha. Sailing as passengers aboard the Betty in 1794, the three men had planned to take over the ship. However, upon murdering passenger Enoch Wood and stealing his money purse, the three men were apprehended by the crew and held until their arrival in Boston where Collins and his two accomplices were tried for the murder of Wood's and hanged on July 30, 1794.
