= Stuart Collins =

Australian rugby league footballer

Personal information
- Full name: Stuart Collins

Playing information
Club
Years	Team	Pld	T	G	FG	P
1994–95	Newcastle Knights	9	0	0	0	0
1997	Hunter Mariners	1	0	0	0	0
	Total	10	0	0	0	0
- Source: As of 6 February 2019

Stuart Collins is an Australian former professional rugby league footballer who played in the 1990s. He played for the Newcastle Knights from 1994 to 1995 and the Hunter Mariners in 1997.
