= Nigel Collins =

Nigel Collins may refer to:

- Nigel Collins (writer), American boxing writer
- Nigel Collins (musician), New Zealand musician, actor, and playwright
