= Darren Collins (Australian footballer) =

Australian rules footballer

Personal information
- Full name: Darren Collins
- Born: 15 November 1967 (age 58)
- Original team: East Reservoir
- Height: 177 cm (5 ft 10 in)
- Weight: 78 kg (172 lb)
- Position: Rover

Playing career^{1}
Years	Club	Games (Goals)
1985–1986	Collingwood	21 (28)
1987–1989	Footscray	24 (37)
1990	Fitzroy	4 (3)
Total		49 (68)
- ^{1} Playing statistics correct to the end of 1990.

Darren Collins (born 15 November 1967) is a former Australian rules footballer who played with Collingwood, Footscray and Fitzroy in the Victorian/Australian Football League (VFL/AFL).

Collins, a rover, was recruited to Collingwood from East Reservoir and was 17 when he made his VFL debut in 1985. He kicked 24 goals from his 15 appearances that season, to finish third in the Collingwood goal-kicking.

In 1987, Collins moved to Footscray, but played only one game that year. He appeared 13 times for Footscray in 1988 and played 10 games in 1989.

He played for Victorian Football Association club Port Melbourne in 1990, but was picked up by Fitzroy in the Midyear Draft and played four VFL games late in the season.
