= Matthew Collins (bioarchaeologist) =

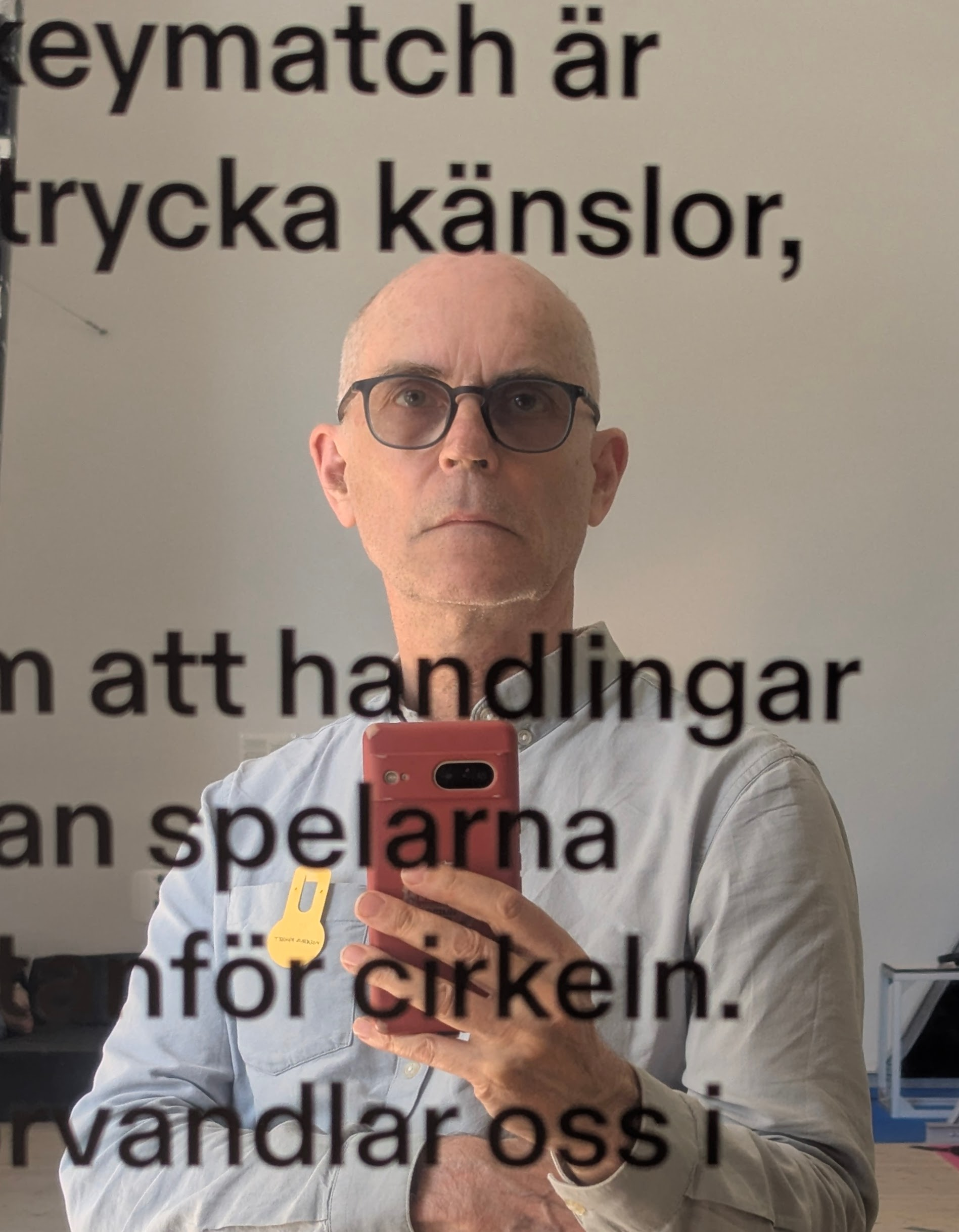
- Collins in May 2026
- Education: Bangor University
- Known for: Work on biological, molecular and scientific approaches to archaeological material
- Scientific career
- Fields: Bioarchaeology
- Workplaces: University of Copenhagen: University of Cambridge
- Thesis: Taphonomic processes in a deep water Modiolus-brachiopod assemblage from the west coast of Scotland (1986)
- Collins' voice recorded March 2018
- Website: curis.ku.dk/portal/en/persons/matthew-james-collins(91bae0db-3ca5-4384-92b0-538e78c8e68d).html

Matthew Collins, FBA is a professor at the University of Copenhagen, formerly as a Niels Bohr professor, and also holds a McDonald Chair in Palaeoproteomics at the University of Cambridge.

Prior to joining Cambridge he was professor of biomolecular archaeology at the University of York where he founded BioArCh, a collaboration between the departments of biology, chemistry and archaeology (BioArCh: Biology Archaeology, Chemistry).

His research focuses on the persistence of proteins in ancient samples, using modelling to explore the racemization of amino acids and thermal history to predict the survival of DNA and other molecules Using a combination of approaches (including immunology and protein mass spectrometry) his research detects and interprets protein remnants in archaeological and fossil remains.

With former PhD student Mike Buckley he developed ZooMS (zooarchaeology by mass spectrometry) a way to rapidly identify bone and other collagen based materials using peptide mass fingerprinting.

In 2022 Collins received the Pomerance Award for Scientific Contributions to Archaeology from the Archaeological Institute of America. Collins was elected a Fellow of the British Academy in 2014 in 2014, the Royal Danish Academy of Sciences and Letters in 2021 and the Royal Swedish Academy of Sciences in 2022.
