= An Collins =

English poet

An Collins (fl. 1653) is the otherwise unknown poet credited with the authorship of Divine Songs and Meditacions, a collection of poems and prose meditations published in London in 1653.

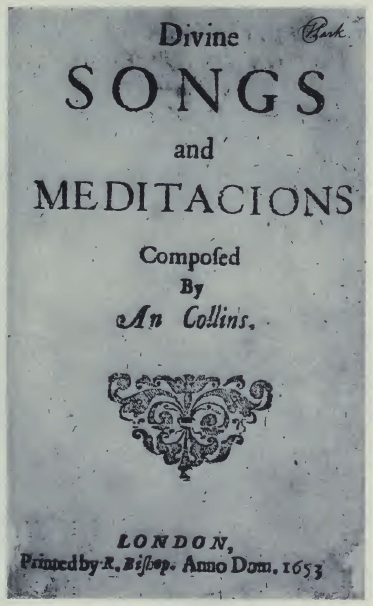
The cover page of Divine Songs and Meditacions, from its original 1653 publication. The last known copy is currently housed at the Huntington Library in San Marino, California.

== Background and controversy ==
Nothing is known of An Collins apart from what can be gleaned from Divine Songs and Meditacions, a collection of poems and meditations published in London by R. Bishop in 1653 "compiled by An Collins."

Most commentators have assumed "An" to be a variant of "Anne" or "Ann." Additionally, there are indications within the texts themselves that Collins was a woman. Some scholars have speculated that "An" could be a pseudonym, or "An" could even refer to the indefinite article "an", indicating that the poet's first name was unknown to the publisher. The current critical consensus, however, is that An Collins wrote as a woman.

From further textual evidence, scholars have developed a likely partial description of An Collins. From certain references in "To the Reader", the preface, "The Discourse", and elsewhere, some commentators have speculated that she may have lived in the country rather than the city. It also seems clear that she had health issues or physical challenges that restricted her ability to move freely and that she lived with chronic pain, as when she writes "I inform you, that by divine Providence, I have been restrained from bodily employments, suting with my disposicion, which enforced me to a retired Course of life" ("To the Reader," ll. 1-3).

She does not mention a family, but rather a faith community.

== Divine Songs and Meditacions ==
The individual texts in Divine Songs and Meditacions range in style and subject. Most deal directly with religious matters, but there are several pieces, notably "A song composed in time of the Civill Warr, when the wicked did much insult over the godly," that focus on the political environment of England during the English Civil War.

Collins's style has interested scholars and there has been some work done analyzing the metric forms of Divine Songs, such as the usage of Rime royal in The Preface. Collins's collection also has historical significance: it is one of the first collected volumes of women's poetry from the seventeenth century, and it provides a glimpse into the life of a woman writer, as well as insight into the political, social, and religious landscape of seventeenth-century England. Several critics discuss her work in the context of the seventeenth-century tradition of the spiritual autobiography

== Religious and political views ==
There has been considerable writing on the subject of An Collins's political and religious beliefs. Early commentators describe her as "a quietist devotional writer," withdrawn from the world. More recent commentators, however, have found a more complicated writer.

Ostovich and Sauer write that, "An Collins's religious beliefs have been variously defined as anti-Puritanical, Calvinist, Catholic, anti-Calvinist, and Quaker..." All of these aspects have been seen in Divine Songs. The Discourse presents a standard primer on Protestant teachings, and its focus on sin has led some critics to speculate that the author may have been a Calvinist. However, the general lack of focus on predestination in the collection makes this possibility less persuasive. Some scholars have put forth the idea that Divine Songs and Meditacions demonstrates a tendency towards Catholicism. In particular, Collins's "meditacions" appear to follow the "Short Method for Meditation" put forth by the Catholic Bishop of Geneva, Francis de Sales, author of the popular Introduction a la Vie Devote, which had three separate English editions by 1613. Ultimately, there is no critical consensus about which tradition of Christianity Collins likely professed.

As with her religious beliefs, there has also been speculation about Collins's political positions. She has been variously described as "critical of sectaries and Independents, pro-Commonwealth, opposed to the radical wing of Parliament, anti-Commonwealth, and Royalist."

== Legacy and influence ==
The largest barrier to Collins's influence has been the limited availability of her work. There is only one copy of the original work extant, located at the Huntington Library, which would indicate limited circulation at the time of publication. However, there have been three modern editions to date: Stewart’s facsimile edition (1961), Gottlieb’s annotated and modernized text (1996), and a newer facsimile edition (2003) introduced by Robert C. Evans, so Divine Songs and Meditacions has become available to new generations of readers and scholars.
