= Ian Collins (soccer) =

American soccer coach

Ian Collins (born April 14, 1963) is a former head men's soccer coach at the University of Kentucky (UK). He held that position from 1994 until his firing on November 7, 2011. His overall record at UK was 197-132-38 (.589). He won Mid-American Conference (MAC) coach of the year honors in 1997, 1999, and 2001 with the Wildcats. From 1995 to 2004, Kentucky dominated the MAC going 44-13-4 (.754) in conference during that time. The Wildcats won a combined seven regular season and tournament titles over that span. In Conference USA, the Wildcats have finished in the top 3 three out of the past five years.

In 2007, the Wildcats defeated top ranked Southern Methodist University to earn the first ever win over a top ranked opponent in school history. From 1991 to 1994, he served as an assistant coach at St. John's University in New York. In 1986, he was named head men's soccer coach at Hofstra University making him the youngest college soccer coach in NCAA history at the age of 22.

On November 7, 2011, Collins was let go after his 18th season at the helm of UK. Collins was named head coach of George Rogers Clark High School in Winchester, Kentucky in May 2012.
