= Isaac Clinton Collins =

American politician

Isaac Clinton Collins (January 2, 1824 – July 30, 1879) was an American judge and politician.

Collins, son of Ela Collins, was born in Lowville, N. Y., January 2, 1824. His mother was Maria, daughter of the Rev. Isaac Clinton. He graduated from Yale College in 1846. After graduation he read law in New York for a year, and in 1848, settled in Cincinnati, Ohio, where he was admitted to the bar a year later. He continued in successful practice there until his death, except during two years service as Judge of the Court of Common Pleas. He also served for two years as a member of the Ohio Legislature, and was otherwise prominent in political affairs in connection with the Democratic party. He died suddenly at his home in Cincinnati, July 30, 1879, of heart disease, at the age of 55. Judge Collins was married, February 3, 1852, to Emily H. Ruth, formerly of Baltimore. She survived him with six children.
