= Disappearance of Kevin Andrew Collins =

One of the first missing children to appear on milk cartons

Kevin Collins
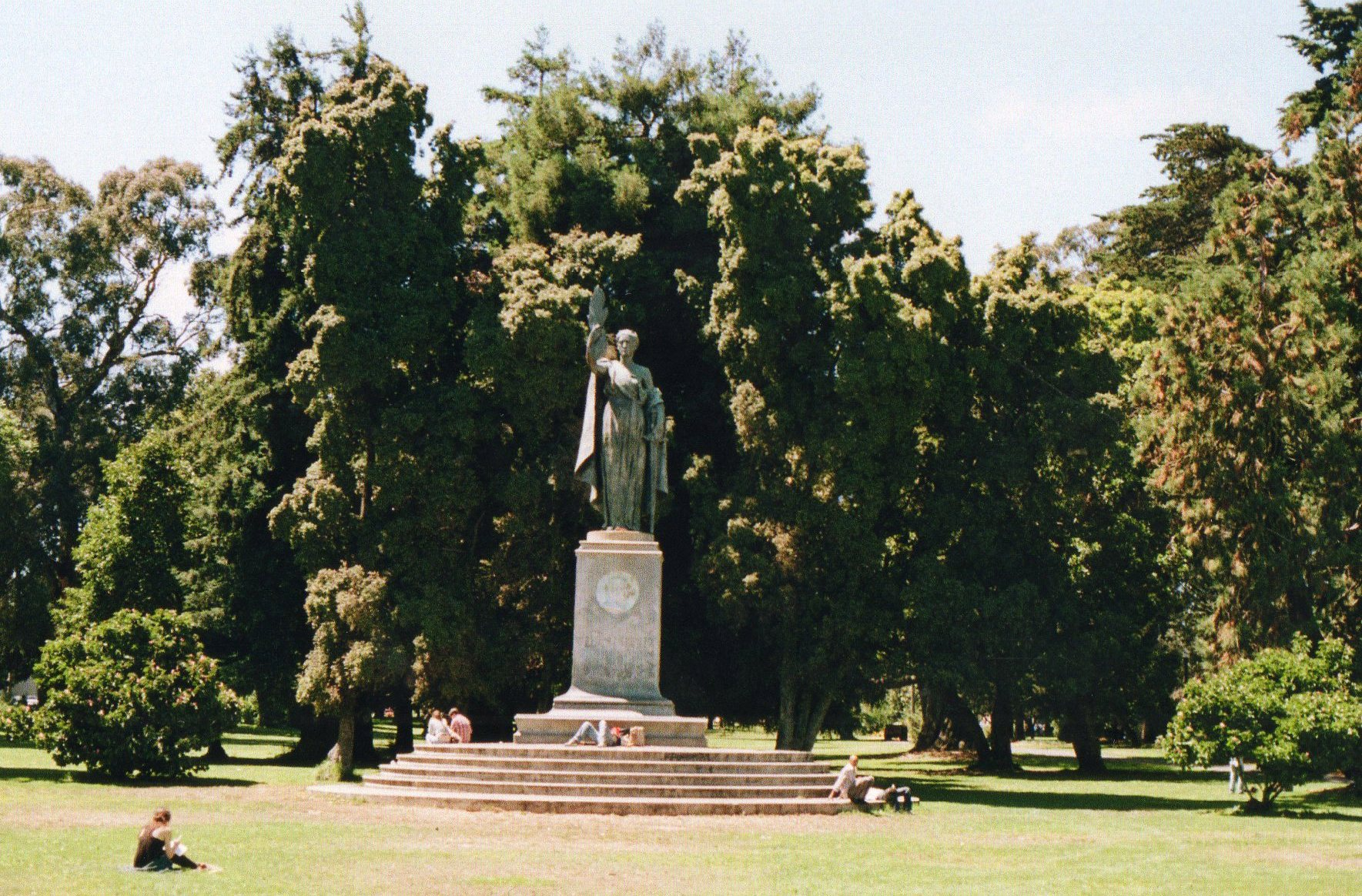
- Panhandle, San Francisco
- Born: Kevin Andrew Collins; January 24, 1974; San Francisco, California, US
- Disappeared: February 10, 1984 (aged 10); Oak Street & Masonic Avenue, San Francisco, California, US
- Status: Missing for 42 years, 9 months and 9 days
- Height: 4 ft 6 in (137 cm)
- Parents: David Collins (father); Ann Collins (mother)

Kevin Andrew Collins (born January 24, 1974 – disappeared February 10, 1984) gained national attention as one of the first missing children to appear on milk cartons and on the cover of national publications, such as Newsweek magazine in 1984. His abduction from San Francisco city streets helped bring to light the plight of missing and exploited children in the US.

== Early life ==
Collins was born in San Francisco to David and Ann Collins, a working-class family with nine children. He was a fourth-grader at St. Agnes School in the Haight-Ashbury district of San Francisco. His family lived at 207 Cole St in the city's Western Addition.

== Disappearance ==
Locations 1984
1 207 Cole St, where Kevin Andrew Collins lived.
2 the corner of Oak Street and Masonic Avenue, where Collins was last seen waiting for the No. 43 bus.
3 1100 block Masonic Ave which, in 2013, was later searched and excavated.

On February 10, 1984, he left early from basketball practice in the school's gymnasium between 6:10 p.m. and 6:30 p.m. One of his older brothers, eleven-year-old Gary, normally would have accompanied Kevin to basketball practice but was home sick that day. Kevin was last seen at approximately 7:55 p.m. at the corner of Oak Street and Masonic Avenue, waiting for the No. 43 bus. Witnesses reported seeing him at the bus stop talking to a tall blond-haired man. He was never seen or heard from again.

=== Search ===
Prior to Amber alerts, broadcast and print media were the only way to inform the general public of a child's disappearance. Following the evening of Kevin's disappearance, posters with his picture were distributed and displayed on telephone poles and storefront windows around San Francisco. Notably, a missing poster featuring Collins inadvertently appeared in the 1984 film The Terminator, which was filmed and set in California. It can be seen pinned to a board on the left of the screen as Paul Winfield's character is shot by the titular antagonist during the police station shootout. The poster also appears in the 1984 movie A Nightmare on Elm Street during a scene in a police station.

In the days that passed, billboards, milk cartons, and national magazine covers showing Kevin's picture circulated nationwide as the country searched for the boy. This, along with the development of a 1983 television movie about the kidnapping and murder of Adam Walsh, helped spark nationwide interest in the plight of missing children. Parents were educated on how to better protect their children from stranger abductions and law enforcement officials learned how to better coordinate their response to child abductions.

=== Aftermath ===
The strain of Kevin's disappearance and the search for their son eventually led David and Ann Collins to divorce. On November 14, 2005, a purported identity thief pleaded guilty to stealing Kevin's name when applying for a passport in his name. Thinking that the case was too old for anybody to remember, he applied using the name "Kevin Andrew Collins" and provided falsified documentation to obtain a passport. A State Department employee who was processing the paperwork remembered the Kevin Collins abduction and alerted authorities.

On January 29, 2013, police served a search warrant on a house in the 1100 block of Masonic Avenue. The concrete floor was removed after cadaver dogs indicated the possible presence of remains. Preliminary reports indicated the remains to be from an animal, not a human. One month later, the National Center for Missing and Exploited Children released an age-enhanced image to show what Kevin may have looked like at 39.

== See also ==
- List of people who disappeared mysteriously: post-1970
