= Samuel W. Collins =

American businessman (1802–1870)

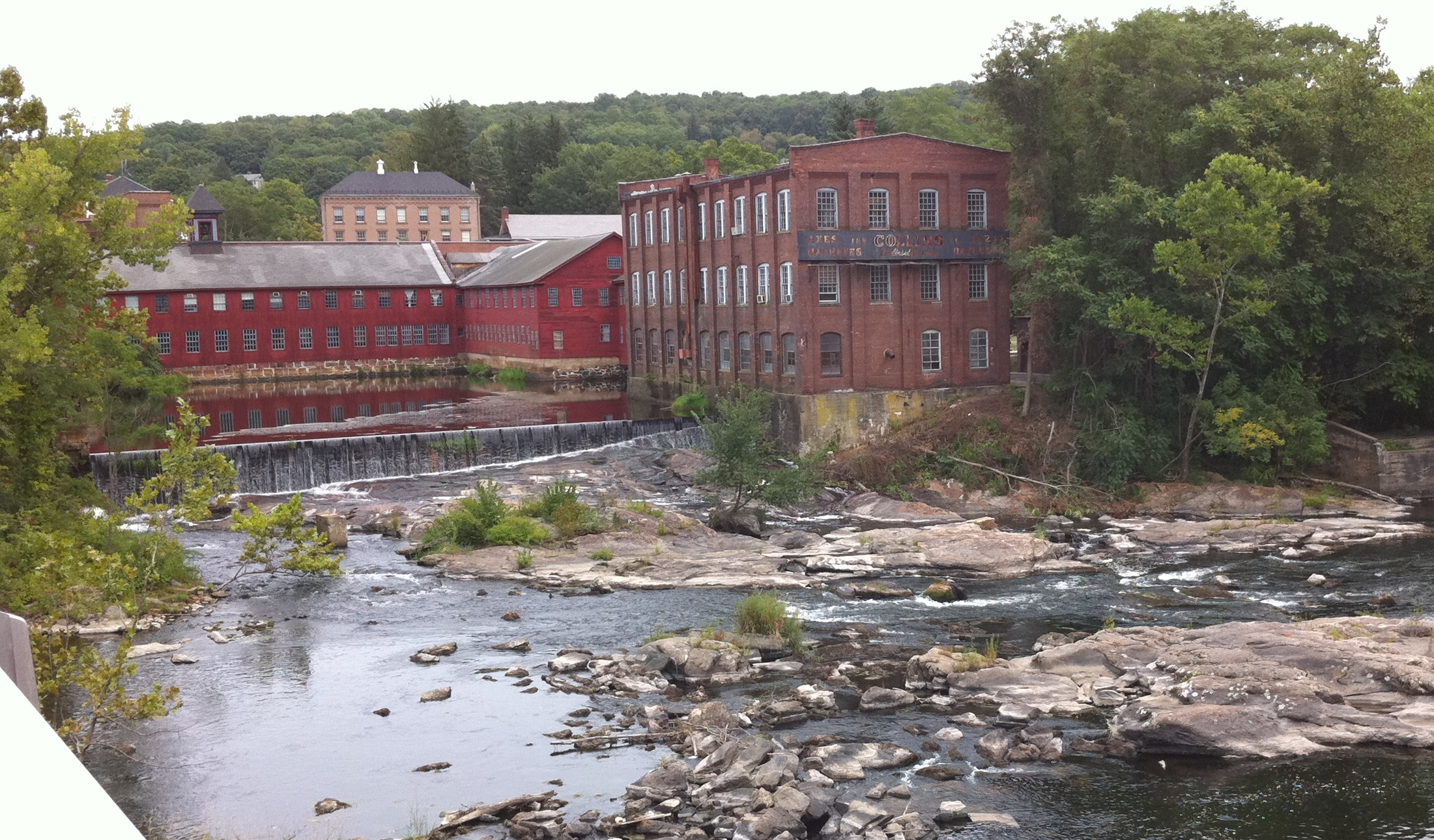
The Collins and Company Works factory buildings in Collinsville, Connecticut on the Farmington River, viewed from Connecticut Route 179

Samuel Watkinson Collins (1802–1870) was an American businessman and founder of the Collins Axe Company in Canton, Connecticut.

He was born September 8, 1802, in Middletown, Connecticut, one of seven children. His father was a successful lawyer in Middletown, and his mother came from Suffolk, England, and was apparently well educated. He died in 1871.

Collins began his company in 1826, producing axes. About 1827, his craftsman Charles Morgan mapped all the steps of making axes, and each step was assigned to separate workers. In 1832, he hired a 24-year-old Elisha K. Root, who made industrial improvements that improved the quality of Collins' axes and revolutionized the efficiency of their manufacture. One innovation was selling axes that were ready to use out of the box, having been sharpened in Connecticut on grindstones driven by water power. Collins accounted for a quarter of all non-textile manufacturing investment and employment in Connecticut in 1832. By 1845, Connecticut was the most densely industrialized state in the nation, where 25 axe manufacturers were joined by brass foundries and factories producing firearms, hardware, machine tools, and consumer goods.

By 1835, Collins was selling 250,000 axes per year at $20 per dozen, largely to cotton plantations on slavery's expanding frontier. For reference, in western Tennessee, an enslaved man using a sharp axe could clear about 4 acres of natural forest land per year, turning it into fields. By 1860, one county there had 65,570 acres of cleared agricultural land, at the cost of 16,000 enslaved man-years of axe work. In Connecticut, silicosis was common among the grindstone workers.

The company later expanded into other edge tools, becoming well known throughout Central and South America as a maker of machetes.
