= Shane Collins (field hockey) =

New Zealand field hockey player

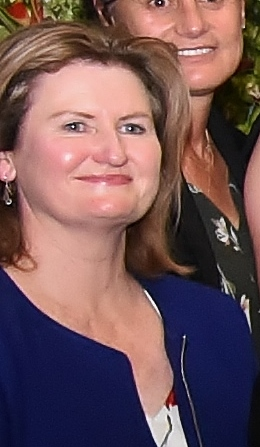
Collins in 2018

Shane Elizabeth Collins (born 25 July 1963) is a former field hockey player from New Zealand, who finished in eight position with the National Women's Field Hockey Team, nicknamed The Black Sticks, at the 1992 Summer Olympics in Barcelona.

After a career in the police, Collins is now undertaking research in the field of sport policy. Collins has switched from hockey to marathon running in more recent years. Recent achievements include representing New Zealand in the Portuguese half marathon.

After several successful half marathons Collins has now turned her attention to triathlon.
