= Richard A. Collins =

British biochemist (born 1966)

Richard Anthony Collins FRSC (born 18 February 1966) is a British scientist.

== Life ==
He obtained his PhD in Biochemistry on 'Purification and characterisation of a mutant form of pyruvate kinase from Saccharomyces cerevisiae produced by site-directed mutatgenesis' from the University of Edinburgh in 1994. He did post-doctoral research on natural products with anti-viral properties in the US and Hong Kong, and has published peer-reviewed scientific articles on HIV-1 inhibition, novel nucleic acid based diagnostics for avian influenza, severe acute respiratory syndrome (SARS), and foot-and-mouth disease.

== Scientific career ==
Collins identified potential anti-HIV-1 activity in a number of partially purified plant extracts, especially Chrysanthemum morifolium, Salvia miltiorrhiza, Prunella vulgaris and commercially available supplements, i.e. polysaccharopeptide (PSP) from Trametes versicolor. He represented a biotechnology company in discussing the scientific validity of the method proposed by the Government in the Bills Committee stage of the proposed legislation and the media.

As a result of the growing interest in genetic parentage testing (DNA profiling) in Hong Kong, Collins, working with others, found that the number of men in Hong Kong who were not the biological fathers of their children might be much higher than expected.

Collins also helped develop a number of rapid diagnostic tests based on nucleic acid analysis, notably the nucleic acid sequence-based amplification (NASBA) technique. Many of these were developed in response to high-profile disease outbreaks in Hong Kong and around the world, e.g. avian influenza H5N1, H7, foot-and-mouth disease, severe acute respiratory syndrome (SARS). Collins has given numerous presentations and interviews to scientists and the media to support the development of the new tests.

Currently, Collins is scientific review director in the Research Office of the Food and Health Bureau, Hong Kong SAR Government, where he is involved in managing public funds related to health services and infectious disease research. His recent interest is in assessing the payback from research supported by public funds.

Collins is also the author of "Under A Blood Red Sky" (ISBN 978-0755201549), a techno-thriller which received favourable reviews when it was published in November 2004.
