= Geoffrey Collins (cricketer, born 1918) =

English cricketer

Personal information
- Full name: Geoffrey Allan Collins
- Born: 10 June 1918; Brighton, Sussex, England
- Died: 25 September 2008 (aged 90); Godmanchester, Huntingdonshire, England
- Batting: Right-handed

Domestic team information
- Years: Team
- 1939: Sussex

Career statistics
Competition	First-class
Matches	1
Runs scored	19
Batting average	8.50
100s/50s	–/–
Top score	17
Balls bowled	–
Wickets	–
Bowling average	–
5 wickets in innings	–
10 wickets in match	–
Best bowling	–
Catches/stumpings	1/–
- Source: Cricinfo, 26 November 2011

Geoffrey Allan Collins (10 June 1918 – 25 September 2008) was an English cricketer. Collins was a right-handed batsman.

== Biography ==
He was born in Brighton, Sussex.

He made a single first-class appearance for Sussex against Oxford University in 1939. In this match, he scored 2 runs in Sussex's first-innings, before being dismissed by David Macindoe, while in their second-innings the same bowler dismissed him for 17. Oxford University won the match by 56 runs.

He died at Godmanchester, Huntingdonshire on 25 September 2008.
