= Geoffrey Collins (cricketer, born 1909) =

English cricketer

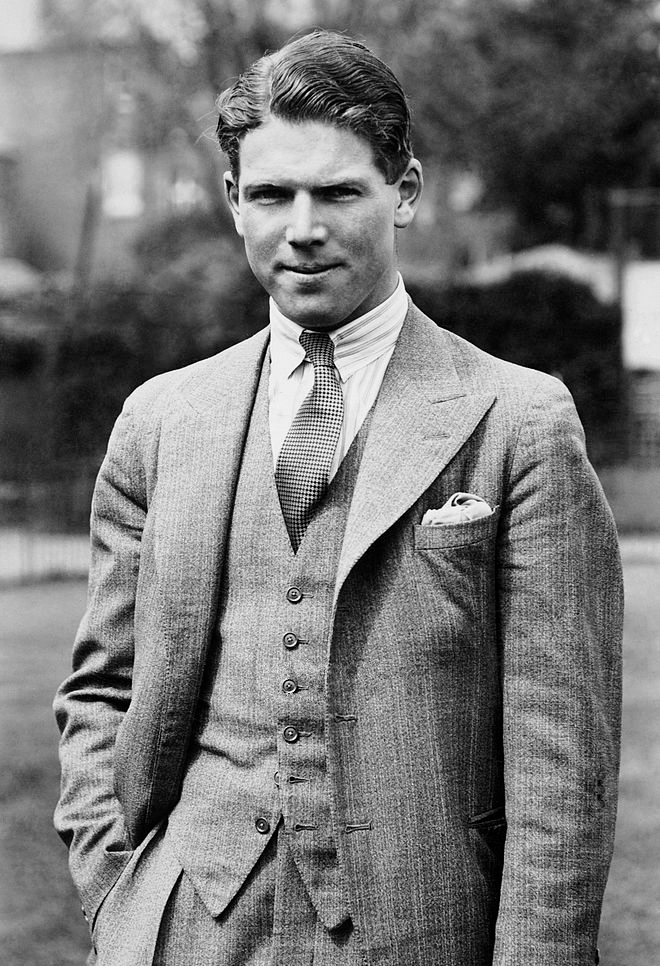
- Collins in about 1933

Personal information
- Full name: Geoffrey Albert Kirwan Collins
- Born: 16 May 1909; Hove, Sussex
- Died: 7 August 1968 (aged 59); Hove, Sussex
- Batting: Right-handed

Domestic team information
- Years: Team
- 1928–1934: Sussex
- FC debut: 21 July 1928 Sussex v Northants
- Last FC: 20 June 1934 Sussex v Oxford University

Career statistics
Competition	First-class
Matches	50
Runs scored	1,140
Batting average	19.00
100s/50s	0/6
Top score	90
Catches/stumpings	17/–
- Source: , 25 March 2019

Geoffrey Albert Kirwan Collins (16 May 1909 – 7 August 1968) was an English cricketer active from 1928 to 1934 who played for Sussex County Cricket Club between 1928 and 1934.

Collins was born at Hove in Sussex and educated at Lancing College where he played in the school cricket team. In his final year at school he made four centuries, including a score of 212, and went on to make his first-class cricket debut for Sussex later in the same season. As a schoolboy, Collins was described as "making all the strokes" with his only major defect being "an occasional failure in patience".

He appeared in 50 first-class matches between 1928 and 1934 as a right-handed batsman, scoring 1,140 runs with a highest score of 90 runs. As well as playing for Sussex he made one first-class appearance for MCC in 1931, but after 1934 his business commitments restricted him to playing club cricket. As well as playing cricket, Collins also played football for Lancing Old Boys and Corinthian Casuals F.C.

During World War II Collins joined the Royal Artillery from the Honourable Artillery Company. He reached the rank of Lt. Col. with 90 Heavy Anti-Aircraft Regiment and served in the North-West Europe Campaign of 1944–45, including the Liberation of Antwerp and crossing the Rhine. He was awarded a Military Cross in 1946. He died suddenly in August 1969 at Hove aged 59.
