= Gerard Collins (canoeist) =

Irish retired slalom canoeist

Gerard "Gerry" Collins
- Born: 26 March 1952 (age 73)
- Occupation: slalom canoeist

Gerard "Gerry" Collins (born 26 March 1952) is an Irish retired slalom canoeist who competed in the 1970s. He finished 24th in the K-1 event at the 1972 Summer Olympics in Munich.
