= Collins =

Collins may refer to:

== Companies ==
- Collins Aerospace, avionics manufacturer (successor to Rockwell Collins)
  - Rockwell Collins, defunct avionics manufacturer
  - Collins Radio Company, manufacturer of shortwave radio and broadcast equipment, later acquired by North American Rockwell
- Collins Booksellers, an Australian book store chain founded in 1922 in Melbourne
- Collins Classics, former record company
- Collins Line, common nickname for the New York and Liverpool United States Mail Steamship Company, an American transatlantic steamship line in the 1800s
- Collins Industries, bus builder
- HarperCollins, publisher
- William Collins, Sons, defunct publisher (merged into HarperCollins)

== People ==
- Collins (surname), includes a list of people with the surname Collins
- Collins (given name), includes a list of people with the given name Collins

== Places ==
=== United States ===
- Collins, Arkansas, a census-designated place
- Collins, Georgia, a city
- Collins, Idaho, an unincorporated community
- Collins, Indiana, an unincorporated community
- Collins, Iowa, a city
- Collins, Mississippi, a city
- Collins, Missouri, a village
- Collins, New York, a town
- Collins, Ohio, a census-designated place
- Collins, Wisconsin, a census-designated place
- Collins Archeological District, an archaeological site in Illinois
- Collins Fork, a stream in Kentucky

=== Antarctica ===
- Collins Bay, on the Antarctic Peninsula
- Collins Glacier, Antarctica
  - Collins Base, a research station on the glacier
- Collins Harbour, in the South Shetland Islands
- Collins Peak, Victoria Land
- Collins Point, in the South Shetland Islands

=== Other places ===
- Collins, Western Australia, a locality of the Shire of Manjimup, Western Australia
- Collins Reef or Johnson North Reef, in the Spratly Islands, South China Sea

== Other uses ==
- Camp Collins, a 19th-century Army outpost in Colorado
- Collins (crater), a lunar crater
- Collins Bird Guide, a 1999 field guide to the birds of the Western Palearctic
- Collins Bridge, a bridge that crossed Biscayne Bay, Florida
- Collins Correctional Facility, a medium security prison in Collins, New York
- Collins Crime Club, an imprint of William Collins, Sons, that published more than 2000 crime novels
- Collins English Dictionary, a printed and online dictionary of English
- Collins Observatory, an astronomical observatory in Corning, New York
- Collins glass, in which the Tom Collins cocktail is traditionally served
- Collins Place, a hotel and office complex in Melbourne, Australia
- Collins-class submarine, a class of diesel-electric submarine operated by the Royal Australian Navy

== See also ==
- Collin (disambiguation)
- Collings (disambiguation)
- Collins Township (disambiguation)
- Collinstown (disambiguation)
- Justice Collins (disambiguation)
- R v Collins (1987), a Supreme Court of Canada case on exclusion of evidence
- R v Collins, an English case on trespassing
- Tom Collins, a gin cocktail
