= Collins (given name) =

- Gender: Unisex

Origin
- Origin: English; transferred use of surname
- Meaning: See Collins (surname)

Collins is a given name, a transferred use of the English surname, Collins, which is ultimately derived from multiple sources. It could be derived from Coll or Colin, an English diminutive of the Greek name Nicholas, or from the Irish word cuilein, meaning "darling", from the Welsh collen, referring to a grove of hazel trees, or of the French Colline, meaning hill.

== Usage ==
It is a name that has been well-used in recent years for African men.

The name is traditionally masculine in the Anglosphere. However, the name has increased in usage for girls due to a character in the 2009 movie The Blind Side. Collins has been among the 1,000 most popular names for girls since 2012 in the United States, and among the top 250 names for girls since 2022. It was among the 1,000 most popular names for boys in the United States at different points until 1915, after which it declined in use for boys. In 2021, the name was used for 47 American boys. There were 55 newborn American boys given the name in 2022, and 62 American boys given the name in 2023. The name was among the 1,000 most used names for newborn girls in Canada in 2021, ranking 627th on the popularity chart with 45 uses for Canadian girls that year.

People with the name include:

== Men ==
- Collins Adomako-Mensah (born 1983), Ghanaian politician
- Collins O. Airhihenbuwa, Beninese public health researcher
- Collins B. Allen (1866–1953), American politician
- Collins O. Bright (1917–?), Sierra Leonean diplomat
- Collins Chabane (1960–2015), South African Minister of Public Service and Administration
- Collins Cheboi (born 1987), Kenyan middle-distance runner
- Collins Obinna Chibueze (born 1995), American musician of Nigerian descent known professionally as Shaboozey
- Collins Dauda (born 1957), Ghanaian teacher and politician
- Collins Denny (1854–1943), American Bishop of the Methodist Episcopal Church, South
- Collins Denny Jr. (1899–1964), American pro-segregationist lawyer
- Collins Fai (born 1992), Cameroonian professional footballer
- Collins Hagler (born 1935), Canadian football player
- Collins Hemingway (born 1950), American writer
- Collins Injera (born 1986), Kenyan rugby player
- Collins John (born 1985), Liberia-born Dutch footballer
- Collins H. Johnston (1859–1936), American football player, medical doctor, surgeon, and civic leader
- Collins Jones (1922–1991), African-American baseball infielder
- Collins Key (born 1995), American YouTuber
- Collins Kipruto (born 1994), Kenyan middle-distance runner
- Collins Mbesuma (born 1984), Zambian footballer nicknamed The Hurricane or Ntofontofo
- Collins Mbulo (1971–2009), Zambian footballer
- Collins Makgaka (born 1996), South African soccer player
- Collins Mensah (born 1961), Ghanaian sprinter
- Collins Agyarko Nti (born 1958), Ghanaian politician
- Collins Nweke (born 1965), Belgian politician of the Green Party
- Collins Obuya (born 1981), Kenyan cricketer
- Collins Ochieng (born 1987), Kenyan footballer
- Collins Okothnyawallo (born 1973), Kenyan weightlifter
- Collins Owusu Amankwah (born 1980), Ghanaian politician
- Collins Parker (born 1947), Namibian judge
- Collins Pennie (born 1985), American actor
- Collins Ramusi (died 1996), South African politician and lawyer
- Collins J. Seitz Sr. (1914–1998), American federal judge
- Collins J. Seitz Jr. (born 1957), American Chief Justice of the Delaware Supreme Court
- Collins Sichenje (born 2003), Kenyan professional footballer
- Collins Sikombe (born 1997), Zambian footballer
- Collins Tanor (born 1998), Ghanaian-born footballer
- Collins Tiego (born 1983), Kenyan footballer
