= Collings =

Collings may refer to:

People

- Collings (surname)

Places

- Collings Lakes, New Jersey, area within parts of Buena Vista Township and Folsom Borough in Atlantic County, and Monroe Township, in Gloucester County, New Jersey, United States
- Collingswood, New Jersey, Borough in Camden County, New Jersey, United States

Others

- Collings Guitars
- Collings Foundation, a private non-profit educational foundation dedicated to the preservation and public display of transportation-related history

== See also ==
- Collins (disambiguation)
