= Collinstown (disambiguation) =

Collinstown may refer the following:

Ireland

- Collinstown, a village in County Westmeath
- Collinstown, County Dublin, a townland within the perimeter of Dublin Airport
- Collinstown, Leixlip, a townland in County Kildare containing the main campus of Intel Ireland

United States

- Collinstown, North Carolina, an unincorporated community in Stokes County

== See also ==
- Collins (surname)
