= Judge Collins =

Judge Collins may refer to:

- Audrey B. Collins (born 1945), judge of the United States District Court for the Central District of California
- Daniel P. Collins (born 1963), judge of the United States Court of Appeals for the Ninth Circuit
- David Collins (judge) (born 1954), judge of the Court of Appeal of New Zealand
- Linton McGee Collins (1902–1972), judge of the United States Court of Claims
- Raner Collins (born 1952), judge of the United States District Court for the District of Arizona
- Richard Collins, Baron Collins (1842–1911), Anglo-Irish judge who presided over the trial of Oscar Wilde
- Robert Frederick Collins (born 1931), judge of the United States District Court for the Eastern District of Louisiana

== See also ==
- Justice Collins (disambiguation)
