= Dublin Airport =

International airport near Dublin, Ireland

Dublin Airport Aerfort Bhaile Átha Cliath

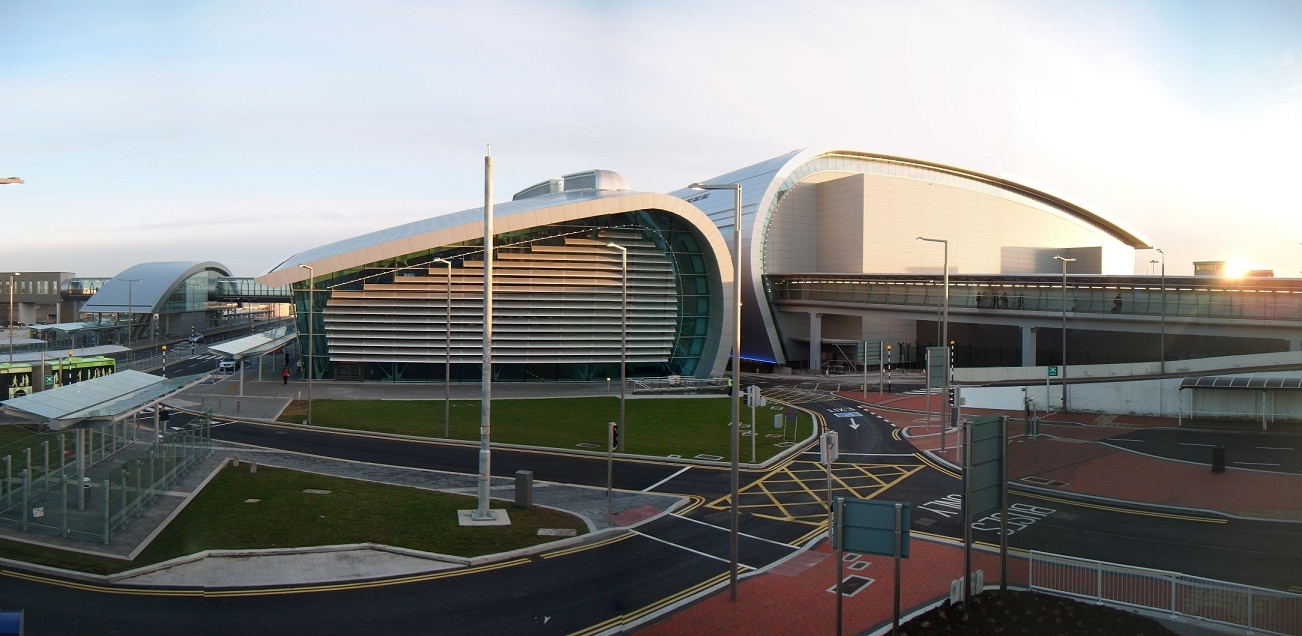
- IATA: DUB; ICAO: EIDW; WMO: 03969

Summary
- Airport type: Public
- Owner/Operator: DAA
- Serves: Dublin
- Location: Collinstown, Santry, Ireland
- Opened: 19 January 1940; 86 years ago
- Hub for: Aer Lingus; Aer Lingus Regional; Emerald Airlines
- Operating base for: Ryanair
- Time zone: GMT (UTC±00:00)
  - Summer (DST): IST (UTC+01:00)
- Elevation AMSL: 242 ft (74 m)
- Coordinates: 53°25′17″N 006°16′12″W
- Website: www.dublinairport.com

Map
- Location north of Dublin city Location in Ireland Location in Europe

Runways
| Direction | Length | | Surface |
| Direction | m | ft | Surface |
|---|---|---|---|
| 10L/28R | 3,110 | 10,203 | Concrete |
| 10R/28L | 2,637 | 8,652 | Asphalt |
| 16/34 | 2,072 | 6,798 | Asphalt |

Statistics (2025)
- Passengers: 36,400,000
- Passenger change 2024-25: ▲5.1%
- Aircraft movements: 226,181
- Movements change 2017–18: ▲4.8%
- Source: Irish AIS; Passengers; Aircraft Movements

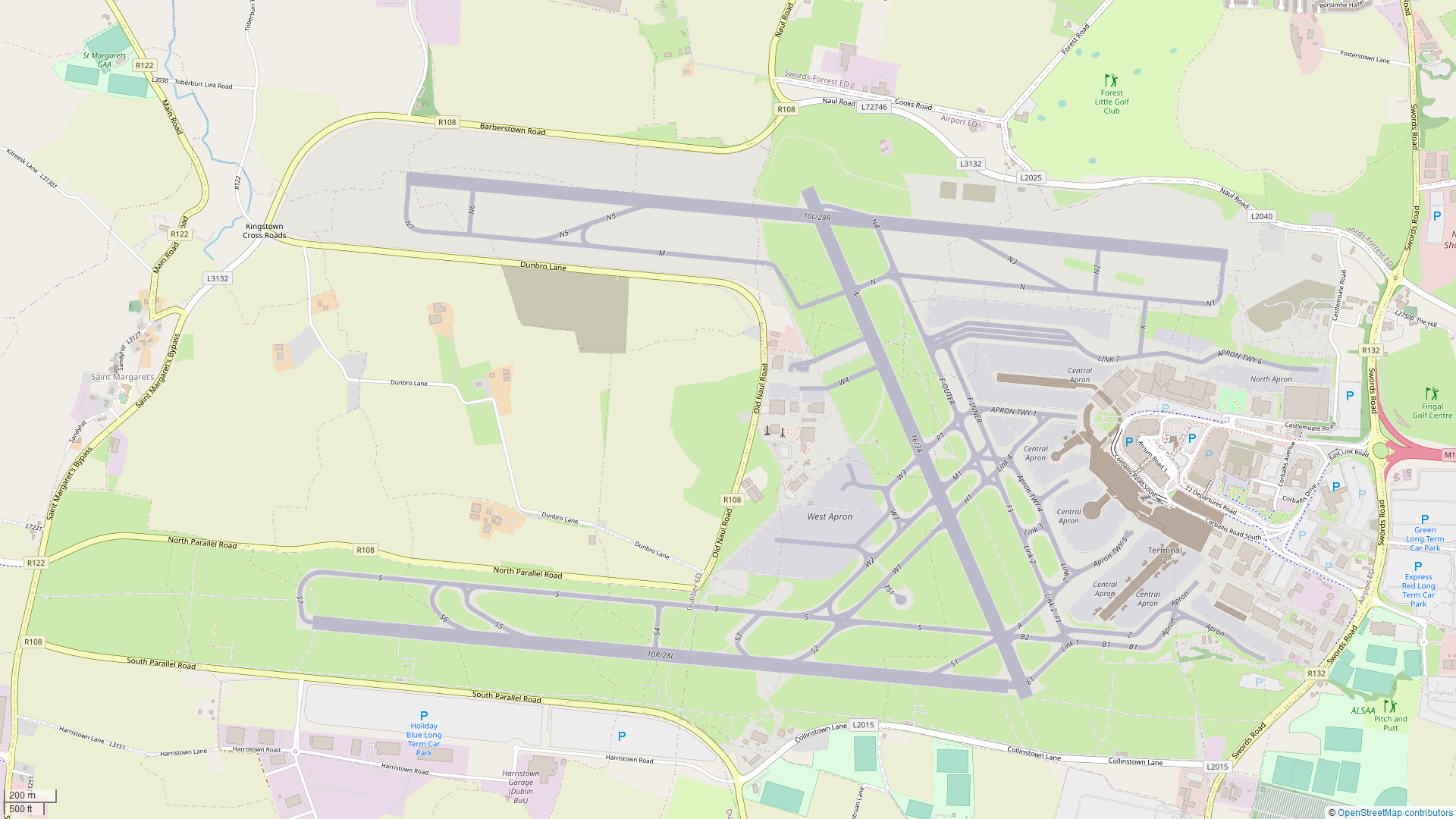
Map of Dublin Airport (with runway 10L/28R)

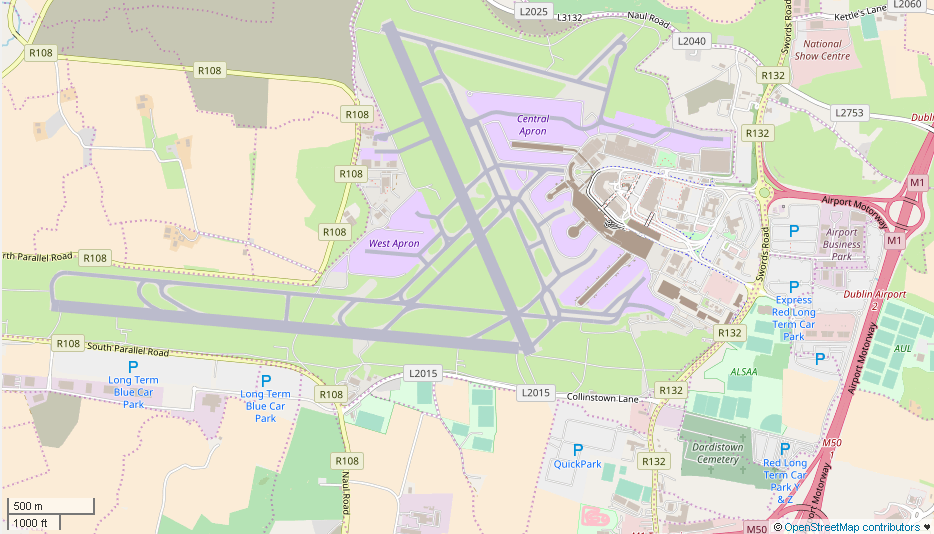
Map of Dublin Airport (before the construction of runway 10L/28R)

Dublin Airport (Irish: Aerfort Bhaile Átha Cliath) (IATA: DUB, ICAO: EIDW) is an international airport serving Dublin, Ireland. It is operated by DAA (formerly Dublin Airport Authority). The airport is located in Collinstown, seven kilometres (4 1/2 miles) north of Dublin, and three kilometres (2 miles) south of Swords. In 2025, over 36.4 million passengers passed through the airport, making it the airport's busiest year on record. It is the 12th busiest airport in Europe, and is the busiest of Ireland's airports by total passenger traffic; it also has the largest traffic levels on the island of Ireland, followed by Belfast International Airport.

The airport has an extensive short and medium haul network, served by an array of carriers, as well as a significant long-haul network focused on North America and the Middle East. It serves as the primary hub for Ireland's flag carrier, Aer Lingus, and the regional airline Emerald Airlines, which operates the Aer Lingus Regional brand. Additionally, it is the home base and second-largest operational base for Europe's largest airline, Ryanair.

United States border preclearance services are available at the airport for U.S.-bound passengers. Shannon Airport, also in Ireland, is the only other airport in Europe to offer this facility.

== History ==
=== Collinstown Aerodrome ===
The airport began as a wartime aerodrome located in the townland of Collinstown, Fingal. In 1917, during World War I, Collinstown was selected as the base for the British Royal Flying Corps. By April 1918, when the Flying Corps was renamed the Royal Air Force, Collinstown Aerodrome was more than 20% complete. Construction was completed in 1919 when the Irish War of Independence broke out. On 20 March 1919, a group of 30 Irish Volunteers, including five employed by the RAF, stole 75 rifles and 5,000 rounds of ammunition from the base. As Collinstown Camp, the site was used for internment of Irish republicans. At the end of 1922, the land and buildings at Collinstown were transferred to the Irish Free State. The airfield fell into disrepair and grass grew on the former runways.

=== The beginnings in the 1930s and 1940s ===
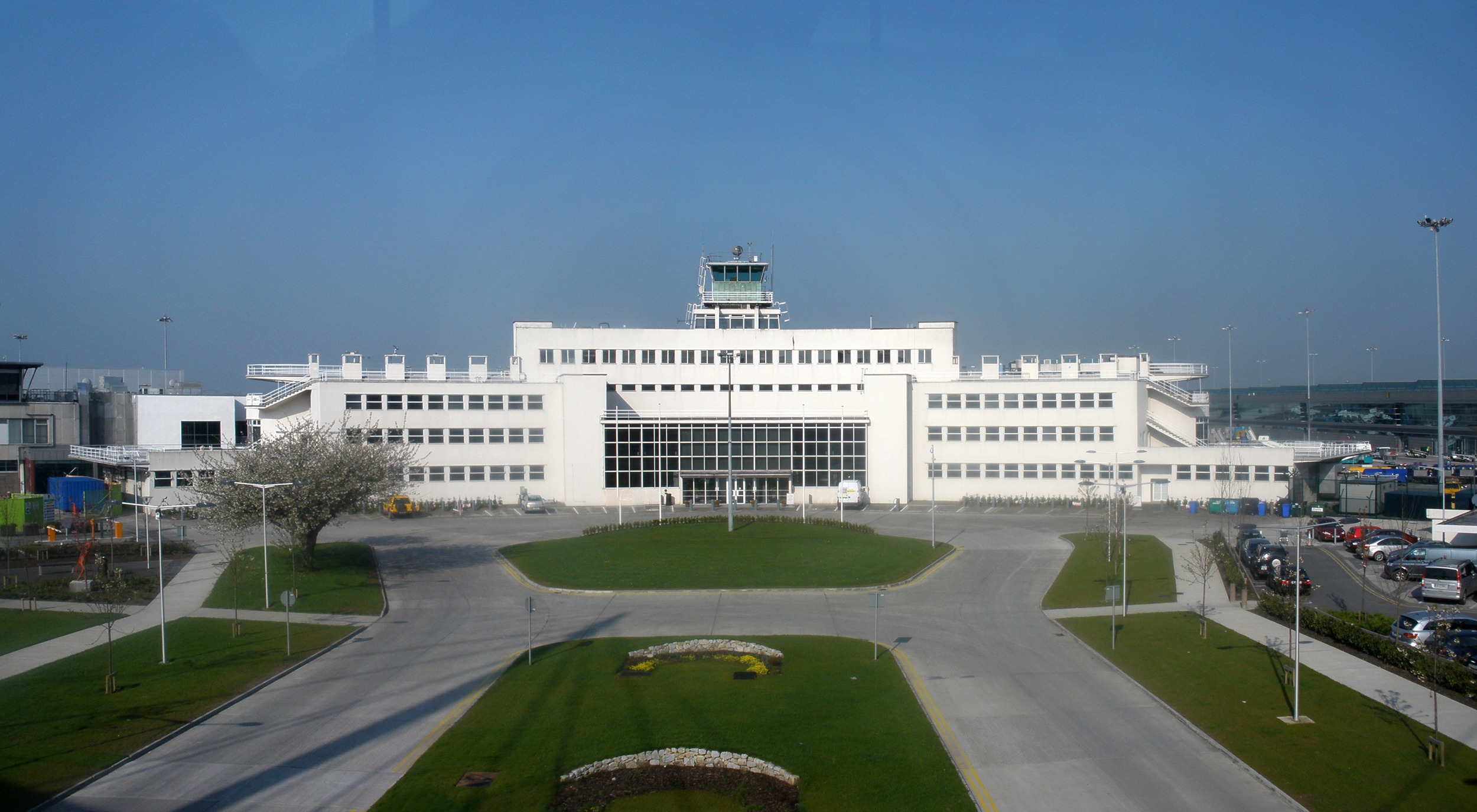
The original international style passenger terminal, completed in 1940

In 1936, the Executive Council of the Irish Free State established a new civil airline — Aer Lingus — which began operating from Casement Aerodrome, at Baldonnel. A decision was made that a civil airport should replace Baldonnel as Dublin's airport. The Collinstown site was chosen and extended into the neighbouring townlands of Rock and Corballis.

Work on the new airport began in 1937. By the end of 1939, a grass airfield surface, internal roads, car parks and electrical power and lighting were set up. The inaugural flight from Dublin took place on 19 January 1940 to Liverpool. In August 1938, work began on a new airport terminal building. The terminal building was designed by architect Desmond FitzGerald, brother of politician Garret FitzGerald. FitzGerald, who had designed an airport terminal as part of his college studies, led a team of architects that also included Kevin Barry, Niall Montgomery, Daithí Hanley, Charles Aliaga Kelly, Dermot O'Toole and Harry Robson. The terminal building opened in early 1941, with its design heavily influenced by the tiered structure of the luxury ocean liners of the time. The terminal was awarded the RIAI (Royal Institute of the Architects of Ireland) Triennial Gold Medal in 1942 and is today a listed building.

Due to World War II, which was known as The Emergency in Ireland, services were severely restricted at Dublin Airport until late 1945. The only international scheduled routes operated during this time were by Aer Lingus to Liverpool (and for a period to Manchester's Barton Aerodrome). The end of the war meant the beginning of a major expansion in services at the airport. Aer Lingus resumed its London service to Croydon in November 1945. In 1947, KLM started the first European flights to Dublin with a service to Amsterdam. Three new concrete runways were completed in 1948, and in 1950 - after ten years in operation - the airport had welcomed a total of 920,000 passengers.

=== Expanding in the 1950s, 1960s and 1970s ===
Throughout the 1950s Dublin Airport expanded with virtually uninterrupted traffic growth. Runway extensions and terminal enhancements were carried out to deal with the influx of traffic and passengers. New airlines began serving the airport also. These included British European Airways, Sabena, and BKS.

In 1958, a new transatlantic service was started by Aer Lingus via Shannon Airport. By the mid-1950s, it was clear that the original terminal building was too small to cope with growing passenger numbers. A new North Terminal was opened in June 1959. Originally, the plan was that North Terminal would handle all US and European flights, but instead, it became the arrivals terminal for all Dublin Airport passengers, while the original passenger terminal was used for departures.

During the 1960s, the number of scheduled carriers continued to grow. By the close of the 1960s, a sizeable number of Boeing 737s, BAC One-Elevens, Boeing 707s and Hawker Siddeley Tridents were using the airport regularly. In the late 1960s new departure gate piers were added close to the old terminal to cope with larger aircraft. These piers would subsequently be connected to Terminal 1. During 1969, the airport handled 1,737,151 passengers.

In his 1969 book Irish Pubs of Character, Roy Bulson describes the restaurant in Dublin airport as "one of the best airport restaurants in Europe" which served a table d'hôte lunch from noon until 3 pm, and hosted regular Saturday night dinner dances from October until April which had become very popular by that point. The airport bar, The Shamrock Lounge, operated from 7 am until 10:30 pm and included a cocktail bar from which the patron could watch the arrival and departure of aircraft. A separate premises named the Fáilte Bar existed in the arrivals building.

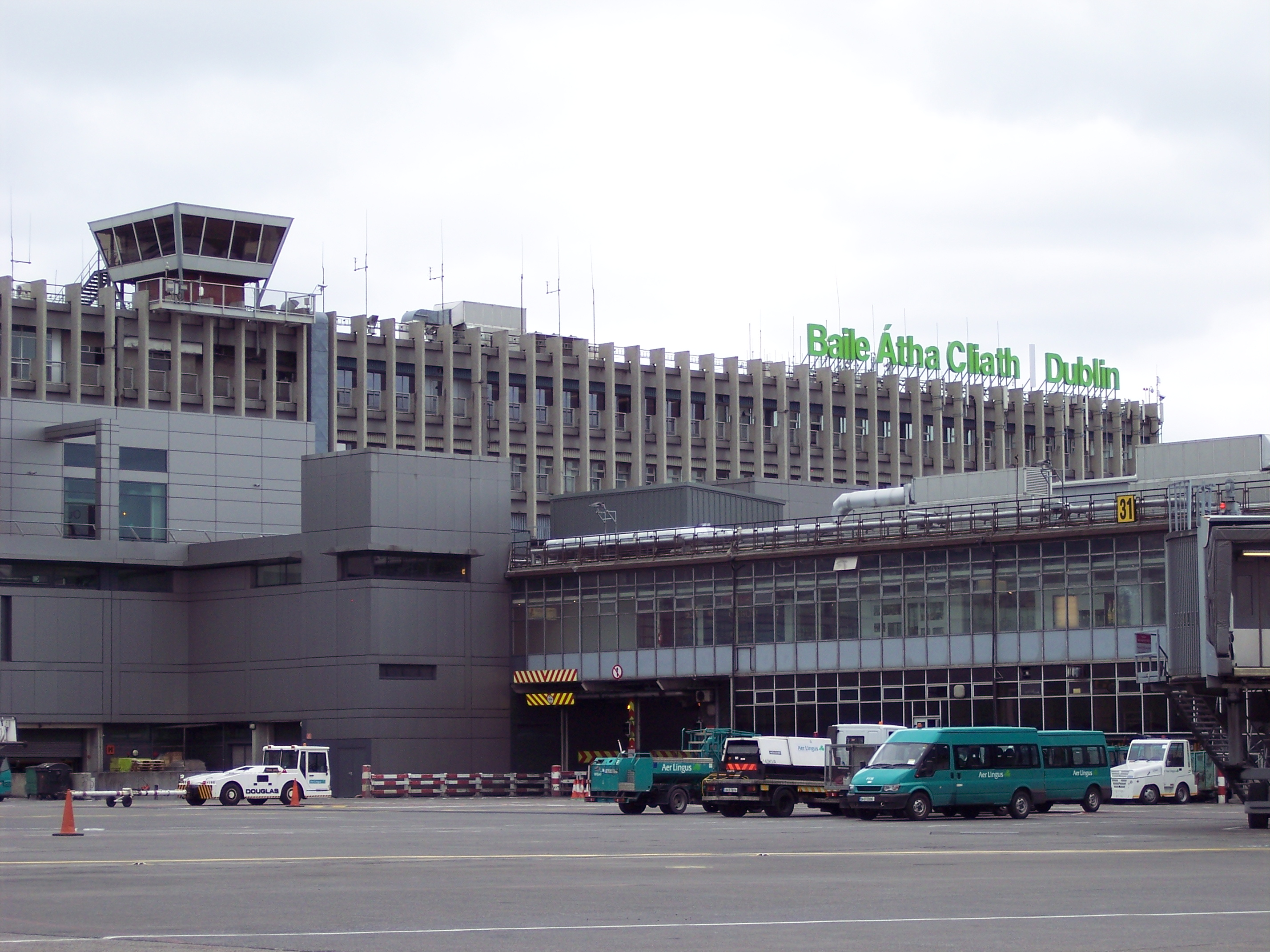
Terminal 1, built in 1972

The advent of wide-body aircraft posed opportunities and challenges for aviation. In 1971, Aer Lingus took delivery of two new Boeing 747 aircraft; the first one arrived in March and, shortly afterwards, performed a flyover above O'Connell Street in Dublin on Saint Patrick's Day; a third Boeing 747 was delivered later that decade. To cope with this, a new £10 million passenger terminal capable of handling six million passengers per year, which became known as Terminal 1, was opened in June 1972. The growth which was anticipated at Dublin's airport (and provided for through heavy investment by the airport and Aer Lingus) during the 1970s did not materialise immediately.

On 30 November 1975, one person was killed and eight others were injured when the airport was bombed by the Ulster Defence Association.

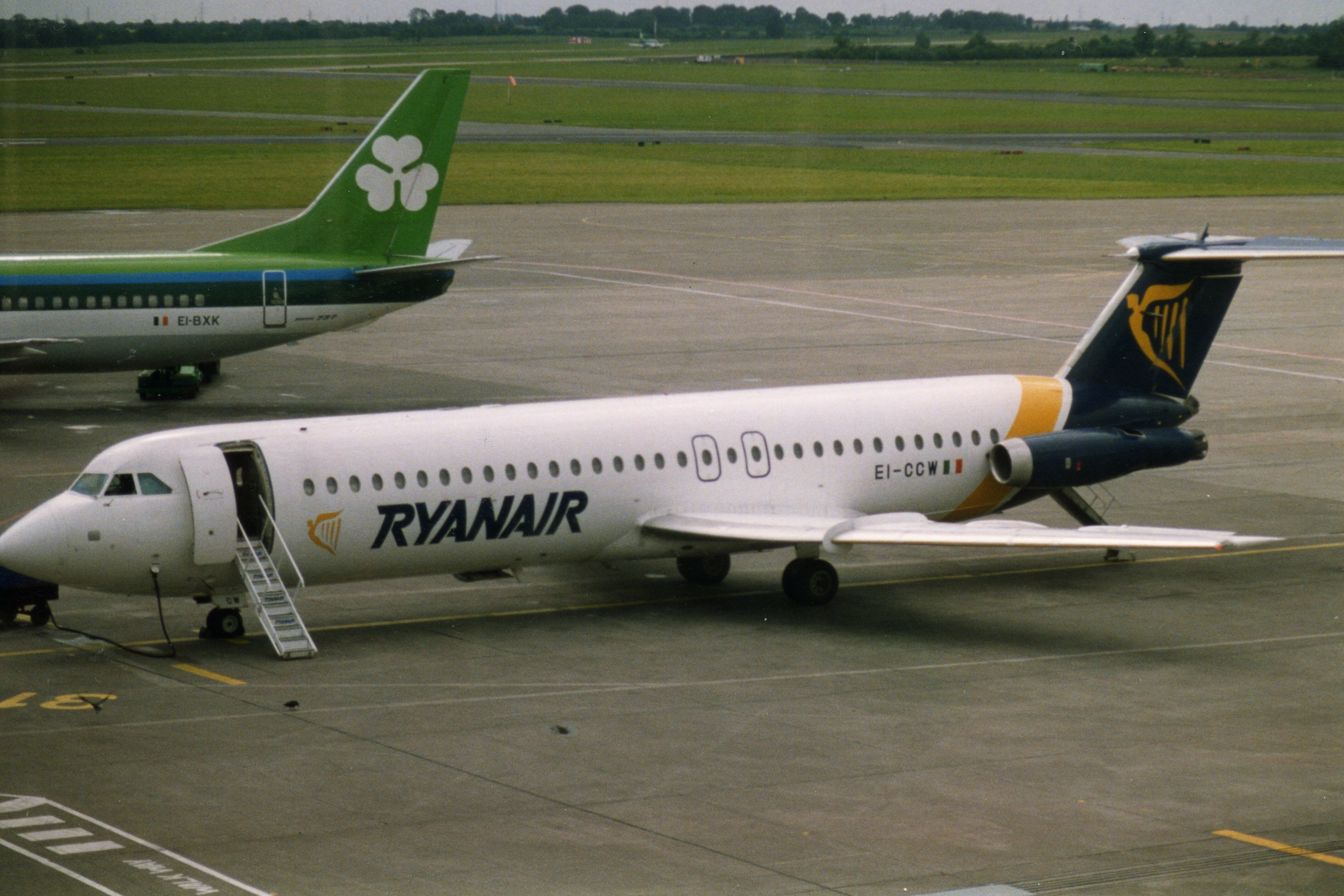
Two of the airport's largest operators side-by-side, a Ryanair BAC 1-11 (front) in its oldest livery, and an Aer Lingus Boeing 737 (rear) in 1993

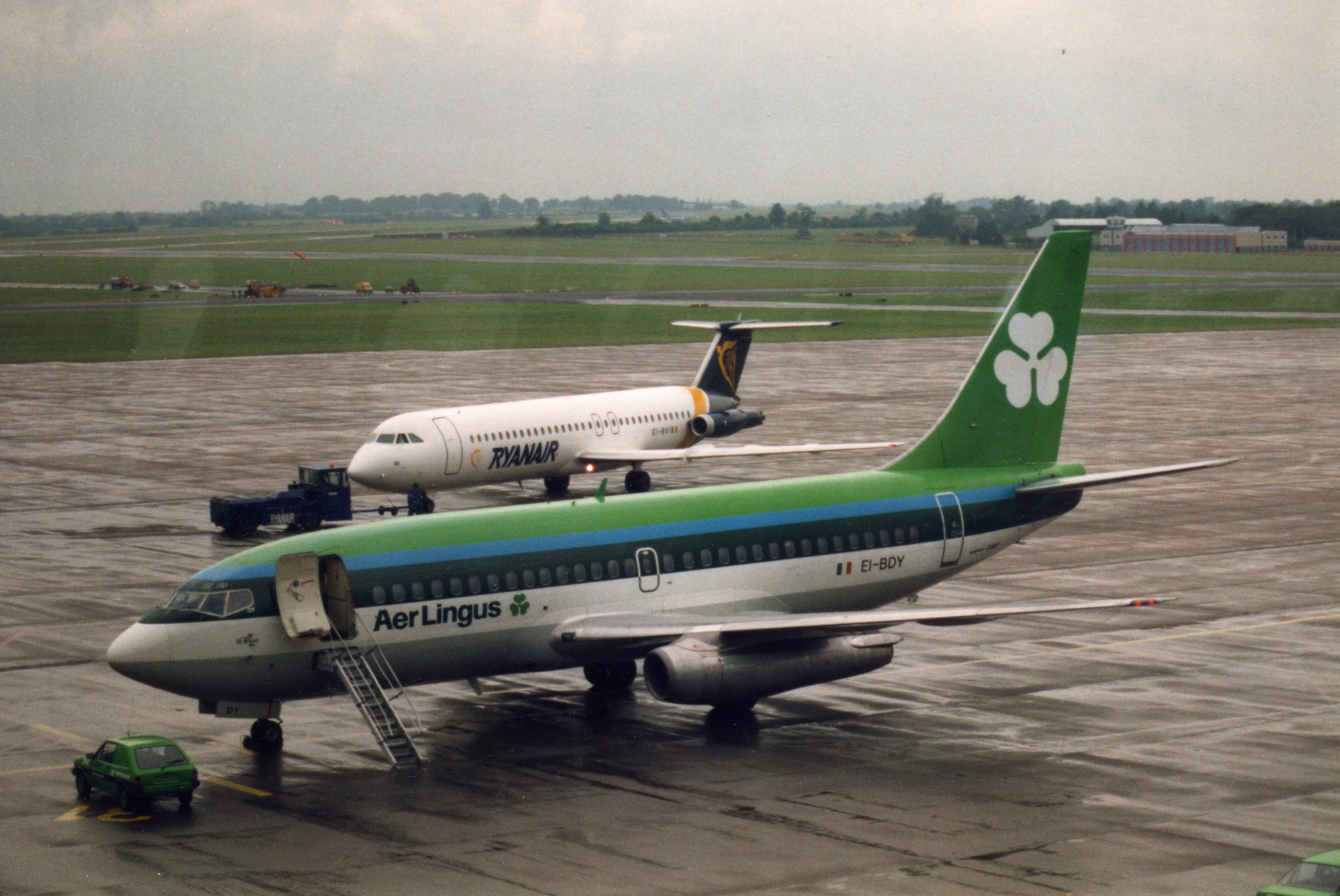
An Aer Lingus Boeing 737-200 and a Ryanair BAC 1-11 in July 1992

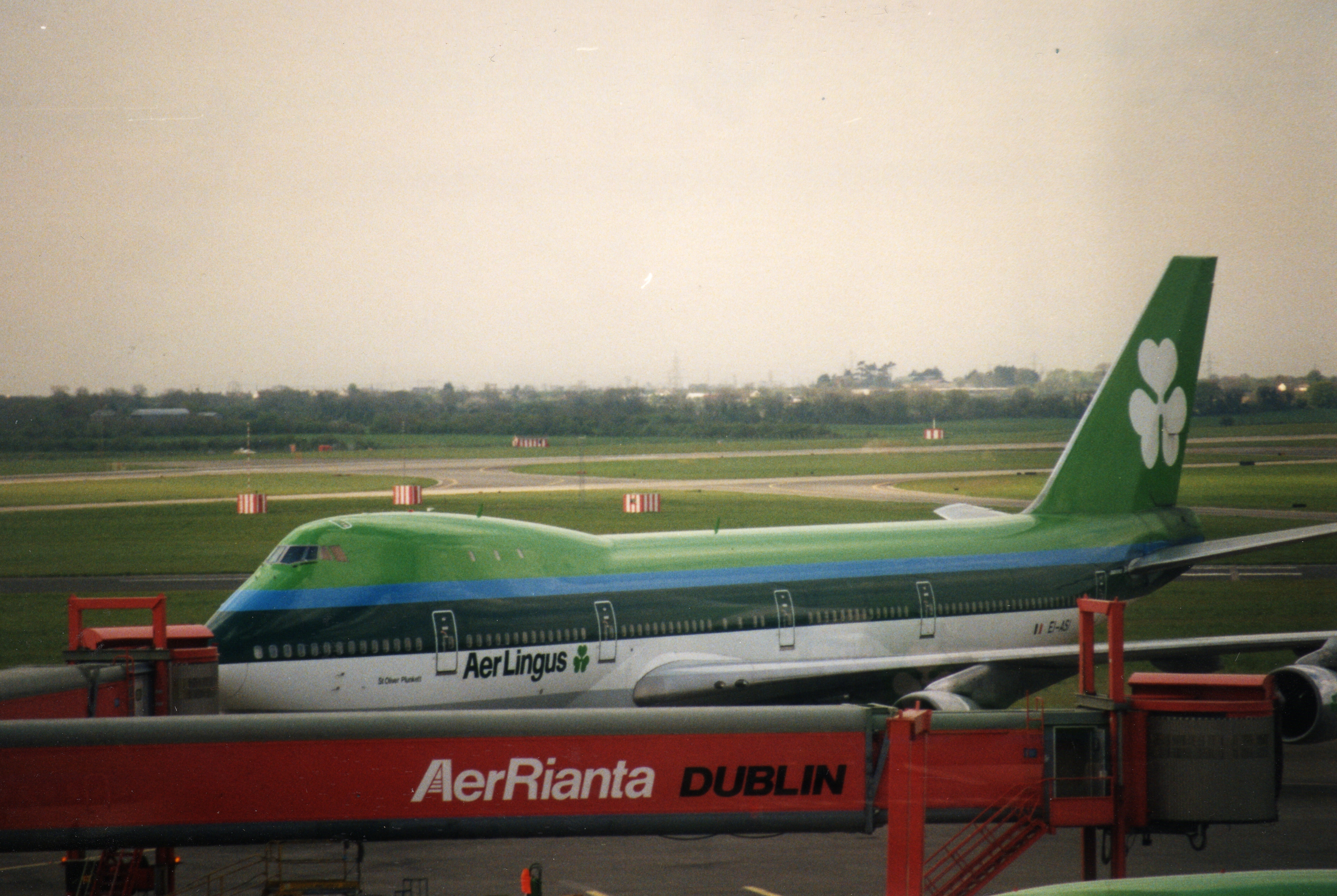
An Aer Lingus Boeing 747 in May 1994

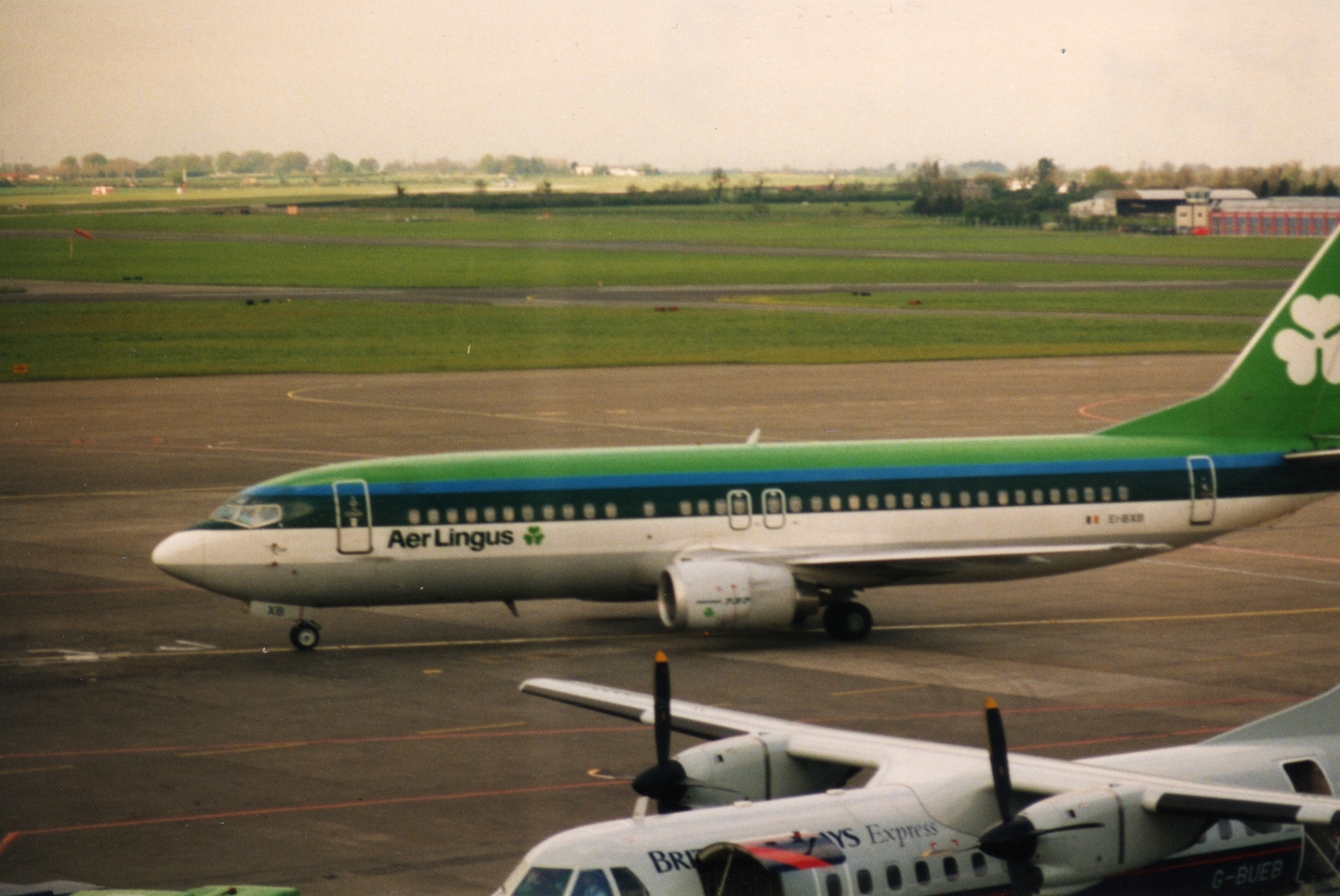
An Aer Lingus Boeing 737-400 and a British Airways ATR 42

=== Continuing in the 1980s and 1990s ===
In 1983 Aer Lingus opened its 'Aer Lingus Commuter' division which took delivery of Shorts, Saab AB and Fokker turboprop aircraft to open regular daily domestic services to and from Ireland's smaller regional airports for the first time, as well as to serve existing routes to smaller regional airports in the United Kingdom. At various stages of its operations, flights were operated to several Irish regional airports to feed passengers into Aer Lingus's international network. These domestic destinations included Cork Airport, Shannon Airport (the "Shannon stopover"), Kerry Airport, Galway Airport, Ireland West Airport, Waterford Airport, Sligo Airport and City of Derry Airport. Aer Lingus Commuter has since been re-absorbed into the main company. The domestic routes, with the exception of Dublin-Shannon, were taken over by Aer Arann. Most of these routes have since been discontinued as the development of the motorway network in Ireland has resulted in significant reductions in travelling time by road. Aer Lingus has continued with the remaining Dublin–UK flights.

During the 1980s, major competition, especially on the Dublin–London routes, resulted in passenger numbers increasing. In October 1987, the airport announced that passenger numbers had reached three million in one year for the first time, adding:

As low air fares continued to stimulate spectacular growth in the numbers travelling to and from Britain, Aer Rianta said that passenger traffic at the airport last month was up 21 per cent from September last year. Over 50,000 extra passengers travelled on Dublin/British routes in September compared with the same month last year.

Passenger figures continue to swell, reaching 5.1 million in 1989, in which year a new 8,650 ft (2,640 m) runway and a state-of-the-art air traffic control centre were also opened. Dublin Airport continued to expand rapidly in the 1990s, with 5.5 million passengers in 1991. Pier A, which had been the first extension to the old terminal building, was significantly extended. A new Pier C, complete with air bridges, was built and as soon as this was completed, work commenced to extend it to double its capacity. The ground floor of the original terminal building was returned to passenger service after many years to provide additional departure gates. Pier D, completed in October 2007, is a dedicated low-fares boarding area and provides 14 quick turn-around stands and departure gates; these are not served by air bridges.

=== The Bilateral Air Transport Agreement ===
In 1993, a major milestone for the airport was the signing of a new United States – Ireland bilateral agreement which allowed airlines to operate some direct transatlantic services for the first time to/from Dublin Airport instead of touching down en route at Shannon Airport on the west coast of Ireland. (Shannon had once been a major transatlantic refuelling stop for pre-jet aircraft, and this agreement was designed to protect the interests of the Shannon region when modern jets no longer required a refuelling stop and Shannon saw a fall-off in traffic.) Airlines still had to provide an equal number of flights either to or through Shannon as to Dublin. A gradual further watering down of Shannon's so-called 'stopover' status came into effect in November 2006 when more direct flights to Dublin were allowed. The stopover requirement disappeared completely in 2008. At that time, airlines were allowed to fly direct to the US from Dublin without having to match these with any to/from Shannon. It was expected that this would result in a huge increase in services between Dublin and the US and Aer Lingus identified 16 destinations that it would like to serve directly from Dublin.

=== Recent history ===
With the success of Ireland's 'Celtic Tiger' economy, Dublin Airport saw growth in the 1990s and 2000s. This demand was driven by an increased demand for business travel to and from the country, together with an increase in inward tourism and a surge in demand for foreign holidays and city breaks from the Irish.

The demand from Ireland's migrant workers, principally those from Eastern Europe, has resulted in a large number of new routes opening to destinations in the European Union accession states. Ireland was one of only three European Union countries (as well as the United Kingdom and Sweden) to open its borders freely to workers from the ten accession states that joined the European Union in 2004.

In 2007 the then shortest runway, 11/29, was closed and converted to an aircraft storage area. This runway would subsequently be demolished for the construction of a second long runway parallel to 10/28.

The airport saw significant declines in traffic in 2009 and 2010, although since 2011 the airport has seen an increase in traffic. During 2012, this increase continued with passenger numbers growing by 1.9%. During 2013, passenger numbers at Dublin Airport were above the 20 million mark for the first time since 2009 with a 5.6% increase year on year. During 2014, this positive trend continued with an 8% increase over 2013. As of early December 2015, passenger figures have increased by 16% compared to 2014, and the previous record of 23.46 million passengers set in 2008 has already been passed. 2019 was the airport's busiest year, recording 32.9 million passengers - an increase in passenger numbers by 4% during the year. Long-haul passenger numbers increased by 4% to almost 5.2 million, while Short-haul traffic increased by 5% to 27.7 million.

In August 2019, Dublin Airport was chosen for the Special Achievement in Geographic Information Systems (GIS) award for its use of mapping software from ESRI Ireland.

Due to the pandemic and its impact, the airport lost 115 routes, as in January 2021, it scheduled flights to just 85 cities, down from 200 before the crisis began.

On several separate days in early 2023, reports of drone sightings at the airport led to the delay and cancellation of several flights. On 4 February 2023, for example, flights were disrupted for 45 minutes after two confirmed drone sightings. And, on 6 February 2023, flights were impacted for approximately 40 minutes. As it is illegal to operate a drone within 5 kilometers of an Irish airfield, DAA called for the Garda Síochana to introduce a counter-drone system and for the government to increase sentences for offenders. Ryanair also called for the government to take immediate action. One man was arrested later in February 2023, and was charged under the Air Navigation and Transport Act. As of April 2024, two men had been charged and due to be tried, separately, for allegedly flying drones near the airport.

Beginning in 2018, airport passenger numbers began approaching their legal limit of 32 million per year. In 2023, the DAA applied to extend this cap to 40 million while also advocating for its complete removal in the long term.

In 2025, after the success of the men's national team, Dublin Airport's social media accounts rebranded their name to "Troy Parrot International Airport" to commemorate the Irish striker's 96th minute hat-trick comeback against Hungary and the 5 goals total he scored in FIFA World Cup 2026 Qualifier that sent Ireland to the FIFA World Cup playoffs. While this was only a marketing stunt, it gained widespread traction, with some pilots even reporting that they were landing at "Troy Parrott International".

== Long-haul traffic ==
As of August 2019, there are services to 31 intercontinental destinations from Dublin Airport (not including Anatolia). In 2007, Etihad Airways began operating between Dublin Airport and Abu Dhabi, and increased its capacity to 14 weekly flights in March 2010. In addition, Emirates has served Dublin from Dubai since January 2012. A total of 22 cities in North America are connected directly to Dublin Airport by seven airlines. In 2015, Ethiopian Airlines began serving Dublin from Addis Ababa, thus inaugurating the first direct air link between Ireland and Sub-Saharan Africa. In 2017, Qatar Airways commenced a daily service to Dublin Airport from Doha.

=== Services to East Asia ===
The Government of Ireland, owner of Dublin Airport, and the Dublin Airport Authority, its operator, have long sought to connect Dublin with East Asia by direct air service. Their plans were realized in 2018 when Cathay Pacific launched 4 weekly direct flights between Dublin and Hong Kong. This was followed by services to Beijing-Capital (via Edinburgh) and Shenzhen (nonstop), launched by Hainan Airlines in June 2018 and January 2019, respectively. In August 2019, however, Hainan Airlines withdrew from Dublin entirely. In September, due to the ongoing political unrest in Hong Kong, Cathay Pacific restricted its previously year-round Hong Kong route to the summer season only. On 1 April 2026, it was announced that China Eastern Airlines will commence a new direct route connecting Dublin and Shanghai in 2026, with full details to be confirmed at a later date. The new route was announced by the Minister for Enterprise, Tourism and Employment, Peter Burke, and was able to be achieved through the Irish government's Strategic Air Access Fund, despite the ongoing dispute over the current passenger cap at the airport.

=== Shannon Stopover and Open Skies ===
In the mid-twentieth century, the Irish government introduced a rule stating that all air traffic between Ireland and the United States must transit through Shannon Airport. In return, the United States government placed a limit of four airports in the US that Aer Lingus could operate to. On 22 March 2007, the Open Skies agreement between the US and EU was ratified. This resulted in the immediate cancellation of the long-running 'Shannon Stopover' requirement, whereby the Irish government had insisted that 50% of all transatlantic flights between Ireland and the United States must pass through Shannon Airport.

=== US border preclearance ===
Dublin Airport is one of only two airports in Europe, and three outside the Americas, with United States border preclearance services for US-bound passengers (the other airports are Ireland's Shannon Airport and Abu Dhabi International Airport in the United Arab Emirates). Those traveling on nonstop flights to the United States complete immigration and customs procedures in Dublin prior to their departure, and are treated as domestic passengers on arrival.

== Aer Rianta and DAA/Dublin Airport Authority ==
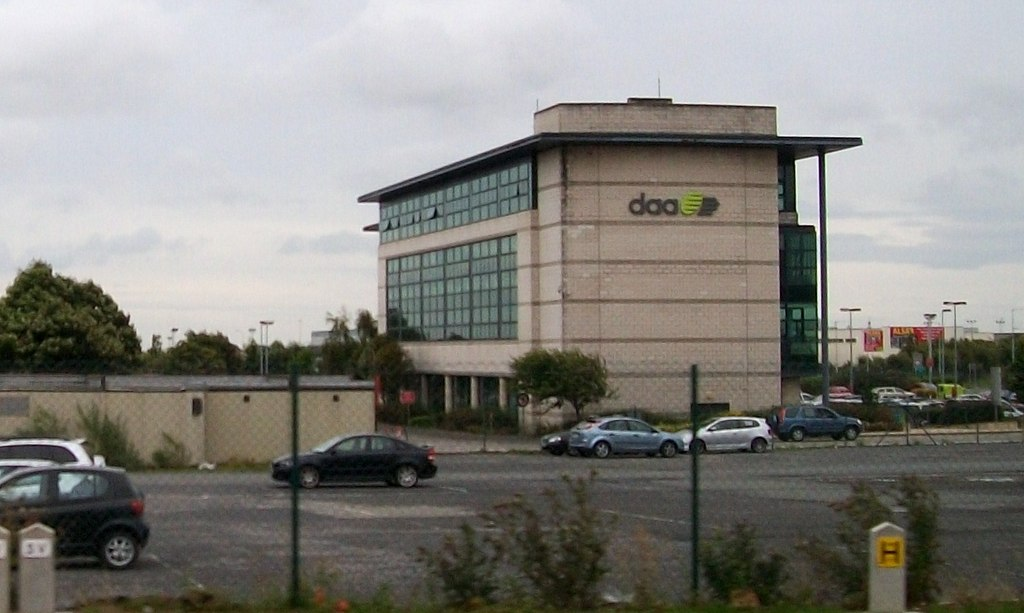
DAA headquarters at Dublin Airport

In October 2004, Aer Rianta (which is the Irish for 'Air Ways' or 'Air Tracks') was renamed Dublin Airport Authority plc, a result of the State Airports Act 2004. All assets and liabilities previously owned by Aer Rianta were transferred to Dublin Airport Authority. The State Airports Act 2004 also established new airport authorities at Shannon and Cork Airports. The Shannon Airport Authority and the Cork Airport Authority had separate boards of directors and were authorised under the Act to prepare business plans, which may have in time lead to their full separation from the Dublin Airport Authority. Following a decision by the Irish Government, Shannon Airport became a separate publicly owned airport on 31 December 2012.

In July 2013, the Dublin Airport Authority was officially renamed "DAA plc" by the Irish Government. The rename was principally to remove the "Dublin" and "Authority" elements of the name which were seen to have little relevance to the overall functions of DAA. The name change announced in July 2013 took effect on 6 November 2014.

As the largest gateway to Ireland, over 25 million passengers travelled through the airport in 2015, a 15% increase over the previous year. The main contributors to the growth in traffic in 2015 were the 23 new routes launched during the year and extra capacity on 40 existing services. Both long-haul and short-haul traffic increased by 15% in 2015. A record 8.9 million people travelled between Dublin Airport and Britain during 2015, which was a 14% increase on the previous year. Dublin Airport also welcomes more than one million passengers per annum from Northern Ireland and is a key international gateway for overseas visitors to Northern Ireland, whose largest airport is less than a quarter the size of Dublin in terms of passenger numbers.

== Passenger terminals ==
=== Terminal 1 ===
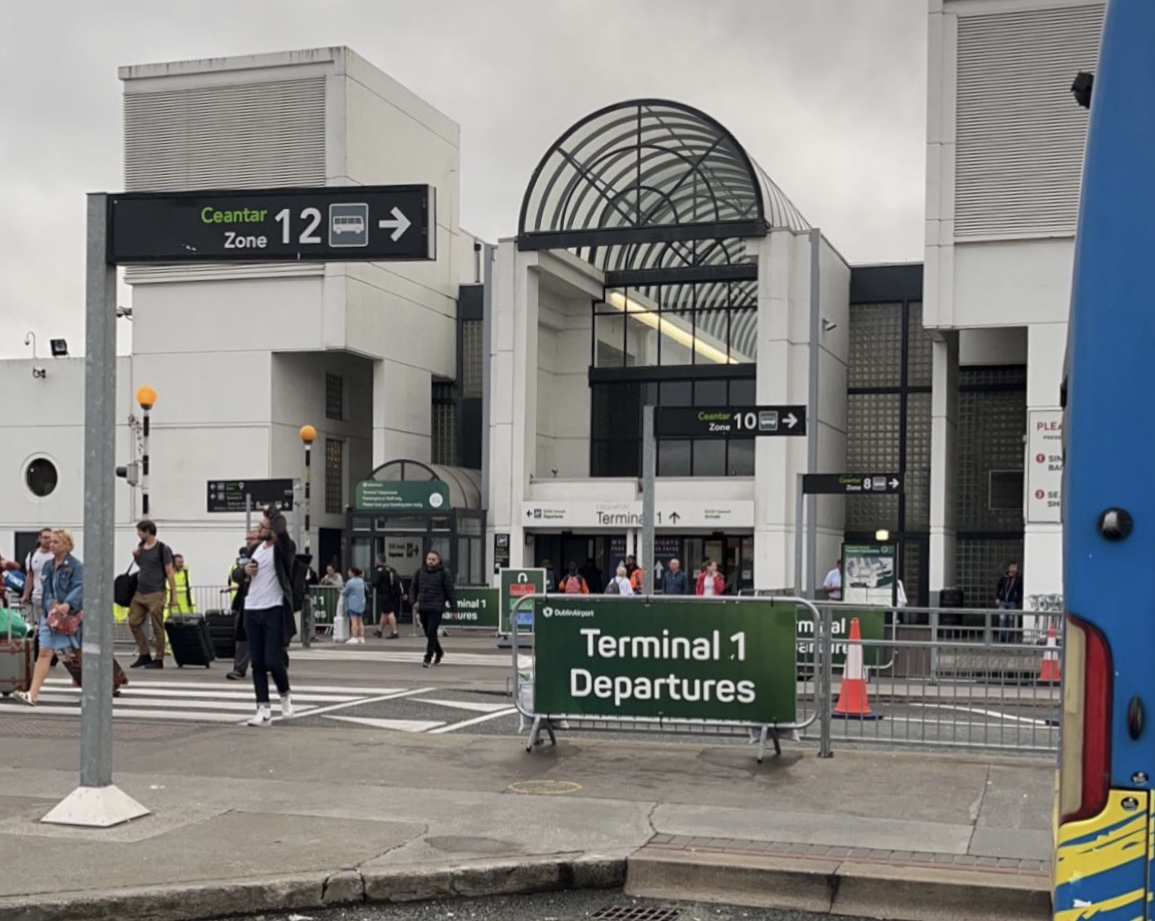
Outside of T1 departures

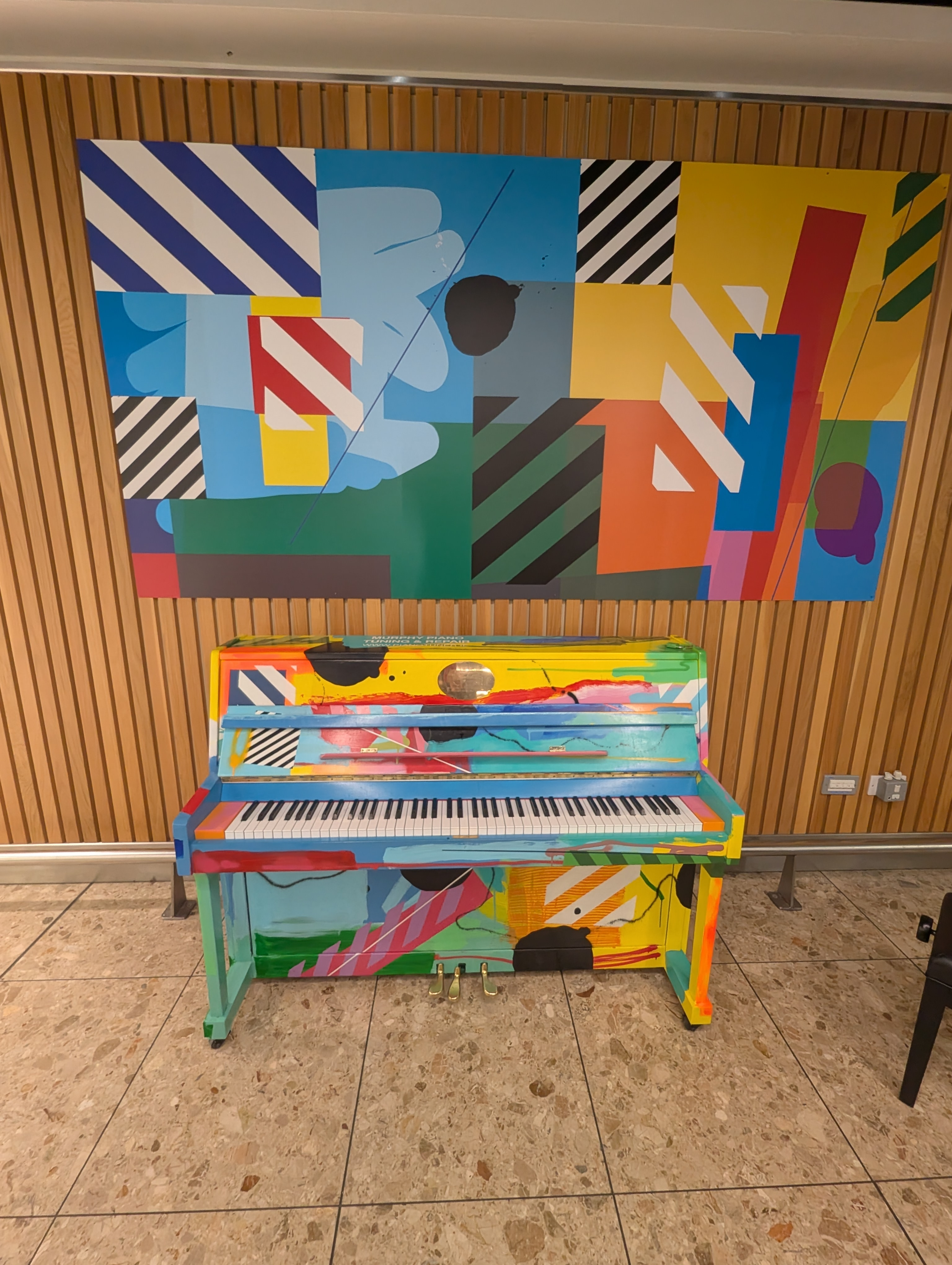
Piano in Terminal 1 of Dublin Airport painted by Al Maser

The current Terminal 1 building opened in 1972 was designed to handle five million passengers per year. The original design included a second pier which would have been identical to the current decagon-shaped boarding Pier B, but this was never built. A car park was originally located on the upper floor of the building and the access ramps are still in place but it was closed for security reasons in the 1970s and converted into offices. Terminal 1 has been regularly extended and improved over the last two decades. In October 2007, a new pier designed by Larry Oltmanns, while design director of the London office of Skidmore, Owings & Merrill, who also designed graphics for its interior, was opened to the north of Terminal 1. This pier caters for the majority of Ryanair flights. In 2009, a new extension featuring new food and retail outlets was added to the side of Terminal 1. Terminal 1 is currently home to all airlines except Aer Lingus, American Airlines, British Airways, Delta Air Lines, Emirates, Iberia Express, JetBlue, United Airlines and Vueling.

=== Terminal 2 ===
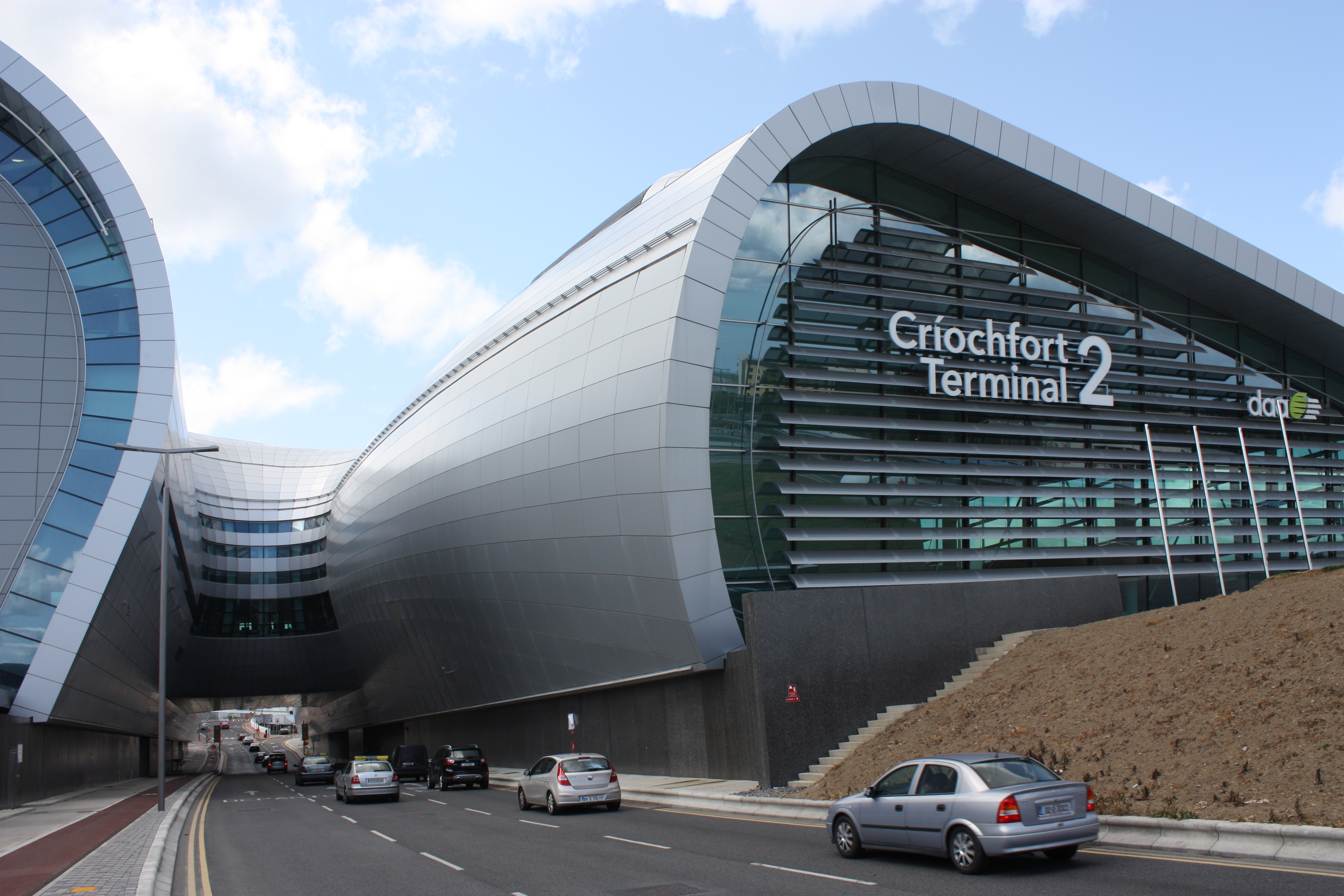
Exterior of Terminal 2

Terminal 2 is a 75,000 m^{2} (810,000 sq ft) terminal and pier (Pier E) which provides aircraft parking for 27 narrow body aircraft through 25 departure gates and 16 immigration desks which can handle up to 15 million passengers annually. The project was designed by Pascall+Watson architects and the total cost was €600 million. Aer Lingus is the main carrier operating at Terminal 2 and since its opening have developed a hub at Dublin primarily for traffic traveling between Europe and the United States. Terminal 2 is now the transatlantic gateway for flights to the United States as it features a US pre-clearance immigration facility which was previously housed in Terminal 1.

Construction of Terminal 2 began on 1 October 2007, and it was officially opened on 19 November 2010 by the then Taoiseach Brian Cowen T.D. The intended purpose of Terminal 2 was to house all long-haul carriers in addition to Aer Lingus; however significant growth in US traffic has resulted in most long haul carriers flying outside the United States remaining in Terminal 1. During the design of Terminal 2 provisions were made for an expanded check in hall and additional pier (Pier F) to cater for future growth. Terminal 2 is currently home to IAG airlines Aer Lingus, British Airways, Iberia Express and Vueling, and U.S. carriers American Airlines, Delta Air Lines, JetBlue and United Airlines. Emirates also operates from the terminal.

== Safety and security ==
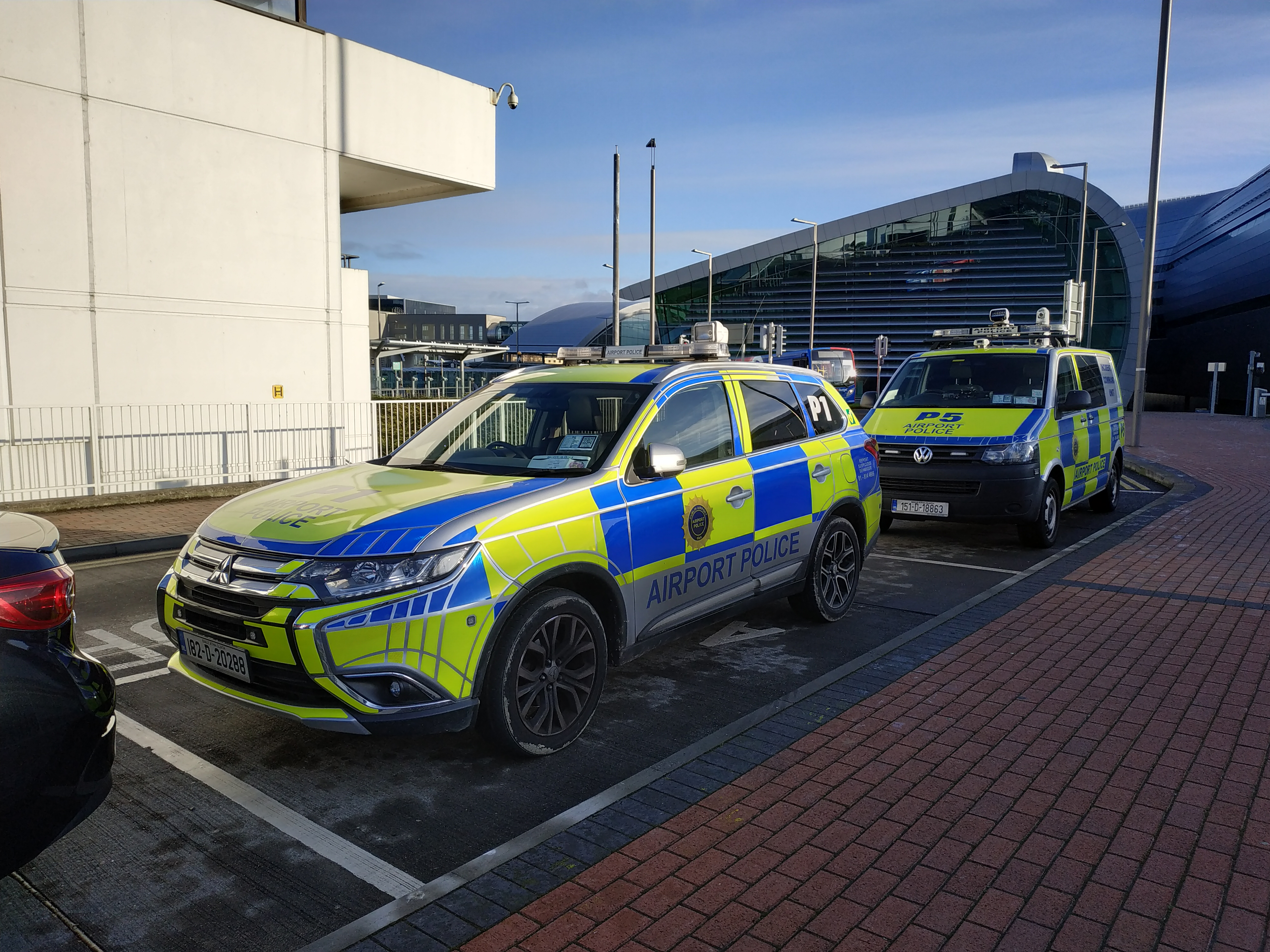
Airport Police vehicle

DAA has its own branch of the Airport Police Service which is mandated to provide aviation and general policing at the airport. The Airport Police Station is centrally located on the Arrivals road between Terminals 1 and 2. The airport also has its own Airport Fire and Rescue Service which provides cover to the entire campus, its roadways and lands.

The Revenue Commissioners provide a customs service to both passenger and cargo terminals, while the Department of Agriculture, Food and the Marine also has a presence in the airport. The Department of Justice, Home Affairs and Migration performs immigration checks on all international passengers arriving at the airport. The Gardaí also have a small sub-station located beside the old terminal.

In 2016 it was confirmed that Garda Armed Support Units (ASU) would be deployed overtly to patrol Dublin Airport and Dublin Port full-time on foot inside terminal buildings and via vehicles outside and surrounding the perimeter to counter the rising threat of terrorist attacks in Europe. The decision was made as a direct result of the 2016 Brussels bombings in Belgium.

Dublin Airport does not have facilities to segregate arriving passengers based on their origin airport. As a result, all arriving passengers (even those on domestic flights) must pass through immigration controls.

In 2025, the implementation of C3 scanners led to the removal of the 100 ml limit for liquids in cabin baggage. Electronic devices and liquids may also be left in bags when going through checkpoints in both terminals.

== Specific regulations ==
=== Noise regulation ===
In 2018, Fingal County Council became designated as the noise regulator under the Aircraft Noise (Dublin Airport) Regulation Act 2019, an act of the Oireachtas. The act implemented Regulation (EU) 598/2014.

=== Passenger cap and nighttime aircraft movement restrictions ===
As part of the planning permission for Terminal 2, in 2007, an annual limit of 32 million passengers was imposed by An Bord Pleanála, due to traffic congestion on the M1.

In July 2025, An Bord Pleanála imposed an annual limit of 35,672 aircraft movements between 11pm and 7am, in relation to the first runway, and imposed a ban on flights taking off or landing on the second runway betwen 11pm and 7pm. In February 2026, the European Commission published a ruling that the annual limit on aircraft movements at nighttime was "not in conformity" with Regulation (EU) 598/2014.

The Irish Aviation Authority took action so that the airport would remain within the passenger cap, in 2025. The Dublin Airport operator, DAA, and a number of airlines, took the Irish Aviation Authority to the court over this action, in 2026.

The cap is to be changed under the Dublin Airport (Passenger Capacity) Act 2026, an act of the Oireachtas. On 5 August, DAA formally asked the government to raise the limit to 40 million.

== Maintenance facilities ==
Aer Lingus, Ryanair, CityJet, Eirtech and Dublin Aerospace have aircraft maintenance hangars and facilities at Dublin Airport.

== Other facilities ==
A multi-faith prayer room is located before security in Terminal 2.

Our Lady Queen of Heaven, a Catholic church built in 1964, is in the airport.

Relief and screening for passengers travelling with pets are available in both terminals.

A VIP service, Platinum VIP operates from the old terminal.

OCS operate services for those with disabilities, or additional mobility needs.

== Airport developments ==
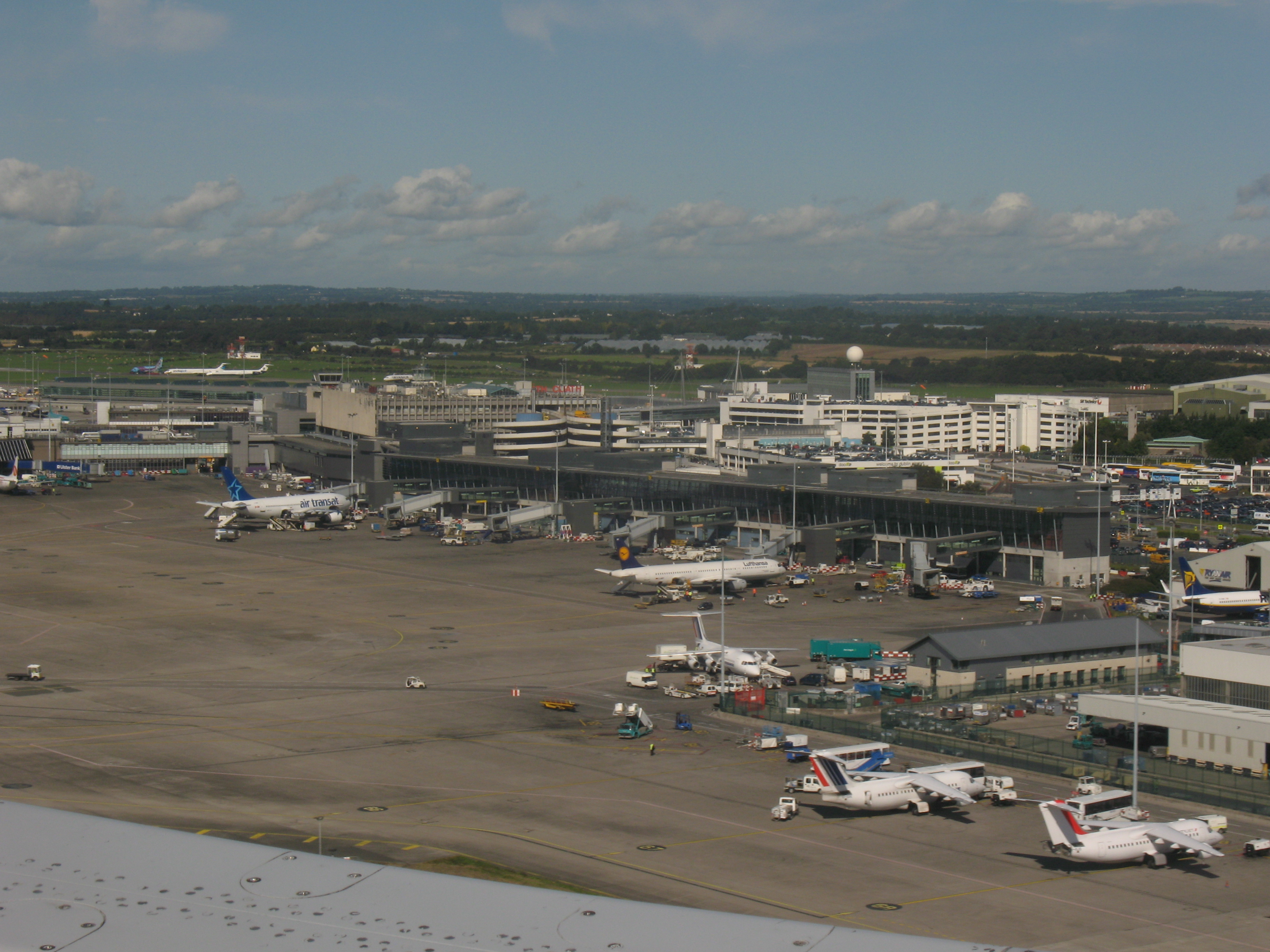
Main Apron seen from the air Pier C (centre, now replaced by Terminal 2) clearly visible with Cargo ramp and Ryanair Maintenance facilities.

=== New air traffic control complex ===
The construction of a new control complex was required, as the location, height and visibility of the existing tower would be inadequate to operate the planned 10L/28R Runway.

The new complex opened on 15 June 2022. At nearly 87 metres (285 ft) high, it is the tallest inhabited structure in Ireland. It has space for twelve operators as opposed to the five of the previous tower and a 360-degree view of the Airport and its surroundings. The new complex will be ideal for simultaneous operation of 10R/28L and 10L/28R.

The old control complex will become a contingent tower in case of emergency.

=== New runway ===
After a delay of several years due to the 2008 financial crisis and predictions of falling consumer demand, it was announced in April 2016 that a new runway would start construction in 2017 and to be completed by 2021.

On 8 October 2020, the existing runway 10/28 was redesignated as 10R/28L in anticipation of the new runway becoming 10L/28R.

The new runway measuring 3,110 m (10,203 ft) opened on 24 August 2022 parallel to the existing runway 10R/28L, which opened (as runway 10/28) in 1989. Planning permission for the runway was originally granted in August 2007, with 31 planning conditions attached. The new runway runs parallel to the north of runway 10R/28L and allows the airport to accommodate 30 million passengers annually, at a length of 3,110 m (10,203 ft). In March 2009 the DAA announced in a proposal for consultation that the new runway may be built to a length of 3,660 m (12,008 ft) following consultation with potential long-haul carriers. A runway of this length would allow direct flights from Dublin to the Far East. The runway cost in the region of €320 million. The airport also has invested heavily in extending aprons and creating rapid exit taxiways to derive maximum efficiency from the existing main runway. Runway 16/34 is most often used in the evening, depending on airport construction. In the day, 16/34 is generally used as a taxiway for aircraft utilizing runway 10R/28L. The first flight on the new runway was Ryanair flight FR1964 to Eindhoven at 11:00 UTC on 24 August 2022.

=== Future developments ===
A number of infrastructure additions and improvements are planned for the airport in the coming years, including two new passenger piers, expanded aircraft parking and apron facilities, an airside tunnel which will link the terminal area with remote stands and an expanded United States border preclearance facility.

=== Proposed third terminal ===
Developers have proposed the development of a new terminal to the west of the existing terminal campus. The land owners and DAA have to date been unable to come to an agreement on the development of the land and discussions are ongoing.

== Airlines and destinations ==
=== Passenger ===
The following airlines offer regular scheduled and charter flights to and from Dublin Airport:

| Airlines | Destinations |
|---|---|
| Aegean Airlines | Athens |
| Aer Lingus | Aberdeen, Alicante, Amsterdam, Athens, Barcelona, Berlin, Bilbao, Birmingham, Bordeaux, Boston, Bristol, Brussels, Budapest, Chicago–O'Hare, Cleveland, Donegal, Düsseldorf, Edinburgh, Exeter, Faro, Geneva, Glasgow, Gran Canaria, Hartford, Indianapolis, Inverness, Isle of Man, Lanzarote, Leeds/Bradford, Lisbon, Liverpool, London–Heathrow, Los Angeles, Lyon, Madrid, Málaga, Manchester, Milan–Linate, Munich, Nashville, New York–JFK, Newark, Newcastle upon Tyne, Orlando, Paris–Charles de Gaulle, Philadelphia, Pittsburgh, Prague, Raleigh/Durham, Rome–Fiumicino, San Francisco, Southampton, Tenerife–South, Toronto–Pearson, Verona, Vienna, Washington–Dulles, Zürich; Seasonal: Asturias, Brest, Brindisi, Burgas, Cancún, Catania, Corfu, Dubrovnik, Frankfurt, Fuerteventura, Hamburg, Heraklion, Izmir, Jersey, Las Vegas (ends 3 December 2026), Malta, Marrakesh, Marseille, Miami, Milan–Malpensa, Montpellier, Nantes, Naples, Newquay, Nice, Oslo, Palma de Mallorca, Perpignan, Pisa, Rennes, Santiago de Compostela, Santorini, Seattle/Tacoma, Seville, Toulouse, Tours, Tromsø, Turin, Venice, Warsaw–Chopin; Seasonal charter: Kittilä, Rovaniemi, Salzburg |
| Air Canada | Toronto–Pearson; Seasonal: Montréal–Trudeau, Vancouver |
| Air France | Paris–Charles de Gaulle |
| Air Transat | Seasonal: Toronto–Pearson |
| airBaltic | Seasonal: Riga (ends 4 January 2027) |
| American Airlines | Dallas/Fort Worth, Philadelphia; Seasonal: Charlotte, Chicago–O'Hare |
| Aurigny | Seasonal: Guernsey |
| British Airways | London–City, London–Heathrow |
| China Eastern Airlines | Shanghai–Pudong |
| Croatia Airlines | Seasonal: Split |
| Dan Air | Bacău, Bucharest–Otopeni (all flights suspended) |
| Delta Air Lines | Atlanta, Boston, Minneapolis/St. Paul, New York–JFK; Seasonal: Detroit |
| Egyptair | Cairo |
| Emirates | Dubai–International |
| Etihad Airways | Abu Dhabi |
| Eurowings | Seasonal: Düsseldorf, Hannover (begins 3 May 2027), Stuttgart |
| Finnair | Helsinki |
| FlyOne | Chișinău |
| Hainan Airlines | Beijing–Capital |
| HiSky | Bucharest–Otopeni, Chișinău, Cluj-Napoca, Iași |
| Iberia Express | Madrid |
| Icelandair | Reykjavík–Keflavík |
| JetBlue | Seasonal: Boston, New York–JFK |
| KLM | Amsterdam |
| Loganair | Aberdeen |
| Lufthansa | Frankfurt, Munich |
| Lufthansa City Airlines | Munich |
| Luxair | Luxembourg |
| Norwegian Air Shuttle | Oslo; Seasonal: Copenhagen |
| Pegasus Airlines | Istanbul–Sabiha Gökçen |
| Polaris Airlines | Chișinău |
| Qatar Airways | Doha |
| Ryanair | Agadir, Alicante, Amsterdam, Athens, Barcelona, Basel/Mulhouse, Beauvais, Bergamo, Berlin, Birmingham, Bodrum, Bologna, Bratislava, Bristol, Brussels, Bucharest–Otopeni, Budapest, Bydgoszcz, Cardiff, Charleroi, Cluj-Napoca, Cologne/Bonn, Copenhagen, Dalaman, East Midlands, Edinburgh, Faro, Fuerteventura, Funchal, Gdańsk, Glasgow, Gran Canaria, Hamburg, Iași, Katowice, Kaunas, Kerry, Košice, Kraków, Lanzarote, Leeds/Bradford, Lisbon, Liverpool, Łódź, London–Gatwick, London–Luton, London–Stansted, Lublin, Luxembourg, Madrid, Málaga, Malta, Manchester, Marrakesh, Marseille, Memmingen, Milan–Malpensa, Murcia, Nantes, Naples, Newcastle upon Tyne, Newquay, Nice, Paphos, Pisa, Porto, Poznań, Prague, Rabat, Riga, Rome–Fiumicino, Rzeszów, Santander, Seville, Sofia, Stockholm–Arlanda, Szczecin, Tallinn, Tenerife–South, Tirana, Toulouse, Trieste, Turin, Valencia, Venice, Verona, Vienna, Vilnius, Warsaw–Modlin, Wrocław, Zagreb; Seasonal: Alghero, Bari, Biarritz, Brindisi, Burgas, Cagliari, Carcassonne, Catania (begins 28 March 2027), Chania, Corfu, Dubrovnik, Girona, Grenoble, Ibiza, Kos, La Rochelle, Lourdes, Menorca, Nîmes, Olbia, Palermo, Palma de Mallorca, Reus, Rhodes, Rimini (begins 30 March 2027), Rovaniemi, Salzburg, Santiago de Compostela, Santorini, Split, Thessaloniki, Zadar, Zakynthos |
| Scandinavian Airlines | Copenhagen, Oslo, Stockholm–Arlanda |
| SkyUp Airlines | Seasonal: Chișinău |
| SunExpress | Antalya, Izmir |
| Swiss International Air Lines | Zürich; Seasonal: Geneva |
| TAP Air Portugal | Lisbon |
| Transavia | Paris–Orly |
| TUI Airways | Seasonal charter: Corfu, Geneva, Gran Canaria, Innsbruck, Kittilä, Lanzarote, Palma de Mallorca, Salzburg, Sofia, Tenerife–South, Toulouse, Turin, Verona |
| Turkish Airlines | Istanbul |
| United Airlines | Chicago–O'Hare, Newark, Washington–Dulles |
| Vueling | Barcelona |
| WestJet | Seasonal: Calgary, Halifax, St. John's (NL), Toronto–Pearson |
| Widerøe | Bergen (ends 21 February 2027) |

== Statistics ==
=== Passenger numbers ===
Passenger numbers at Dublin Airport increased every year during the 10 years between 1998 and 2008, from around 11.6 million to over 23.4 million. Passenger numbers fell however during the subsequent two years to around 18.4 million in 2010, with a small increase to 18.7 million in 2011 and 19.1 million in 2012, then 2013 saw a significant increase of 5.6% to 20.2 million. In 2014, passenger numbers increased by almost 8% to over 21.7 million. Traffic growth of over 15% during 2015 resulted in passenger numbers exceeding 25 million for the first time. The previous record of 23.46 million (set in 2008) was exceeded during the first week of December 2015.

==== Table ====
| Year | Passengers | % Change YoY | Ref |
|---|---|---|---|
| 1998 | 11,641,100 | – | |
| 1999 | 12,802,031 | ▲9.9 | |
| 2000 | 13,843,528 | ▲8.1 | |
| 2001 | 14,333,555 | ▲3.5 | |
| 2002 | 15,084,667 | ▲5.2 | |
| 2003 | 15,856,084 | ▲5.1 | |
| 2004 | 17,138,373 | ▲8.1 | |
| 2005 | 18,450,439 | ▲7.7 | |
| 2006 | 21,196,382 | ▲14.9 | |
| 2007 | 23,287,438 | ▲9.9 | |
| 2008 | 23,466,711 | ▲0.8 | |
| 2009 | 20,503,677 | ▼12.6 | |
| 2010 | 18,431,064 | ▼10.1 | |
| 2011 | 18,740,593 | ▲1.7 | |
| 2012 | 19,099,649 | ▲1.9 | |
| 2013 | 20,166,783 | ▲5.6 | |
| 2014 | 21,711,967 | ▲7.7 | |
| 2015 | 25,049,319 | ▲15.4 | |
| 2016 | 27,907,384 | ▲11.4 | |
| 2017 | 29,582,308 | ▲6.0 | |
| 2018 | 31,495,604 | ▲6.5 | |
| 2019 | 32,907,673 | ▲4.0 | |
| 2020 | 7,267,240 | ▼77.8 | |
| 2021 | 8,266,271 | ▲13.7 | |
| 2022 | 27,787,556 | ▲236.2 | |
| 2023 | 31,908,471 | ▲14.8 | |
| 2024 | 34,623,260 | ▲8.5 | |
| 2025 | 36,402,926 | ▲5.1 | |

=== Busiest routes ===
Busiest international routes at Dublin Airport (2025)
| Rank | Airport | Passengers Handled | % Change 2023/24 |
|---|---|---|---|
| 1 | London–Heathrow | 1,825,433 | ▼4.1 |
| 2 | Amsterdam | 1,332,261 | ▲2.6 |
| 3 | Manchester | 1,148,219 | ▲7.9 |
| 4 | London–Gatwick | 999,525 | ▼5.1 |
| 5 | London–Stansted | 999,076 | ▲4.4 |
| 6 | Birmingham | 874,047 | ▲7.5 |
| 7 | Málaga | 853,544 | ▲2.7 |
| 8 | Edinburgh | 788,451 | ▲6.6 |
| 9 | Paris–Charles de Gaulle | 756,293 | ▲8.2 |
| 10 | Barcelona | 726,783 | ▲2.1 |
Source: Central Statistics Office

== Ground transport ==
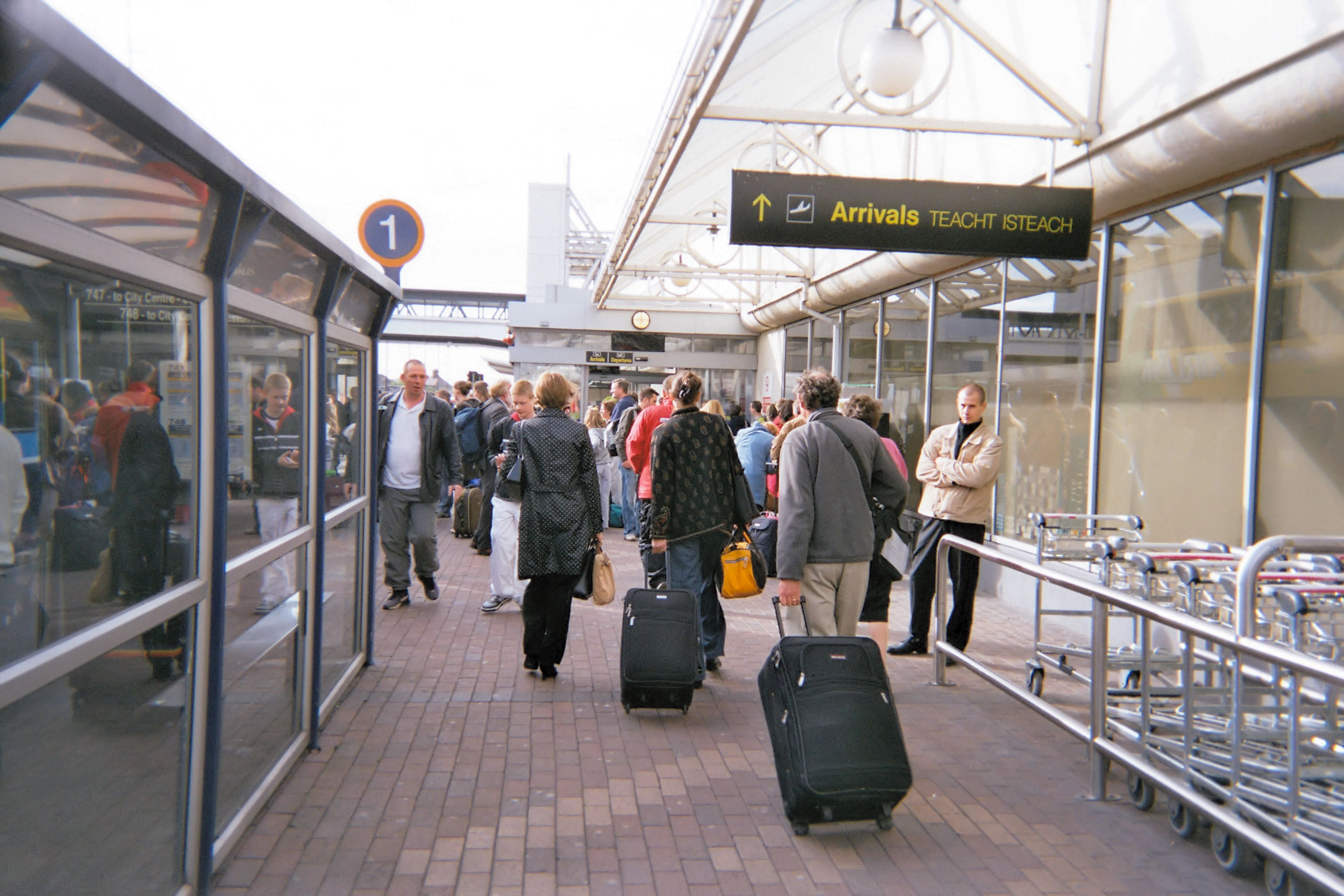
Outside the airport

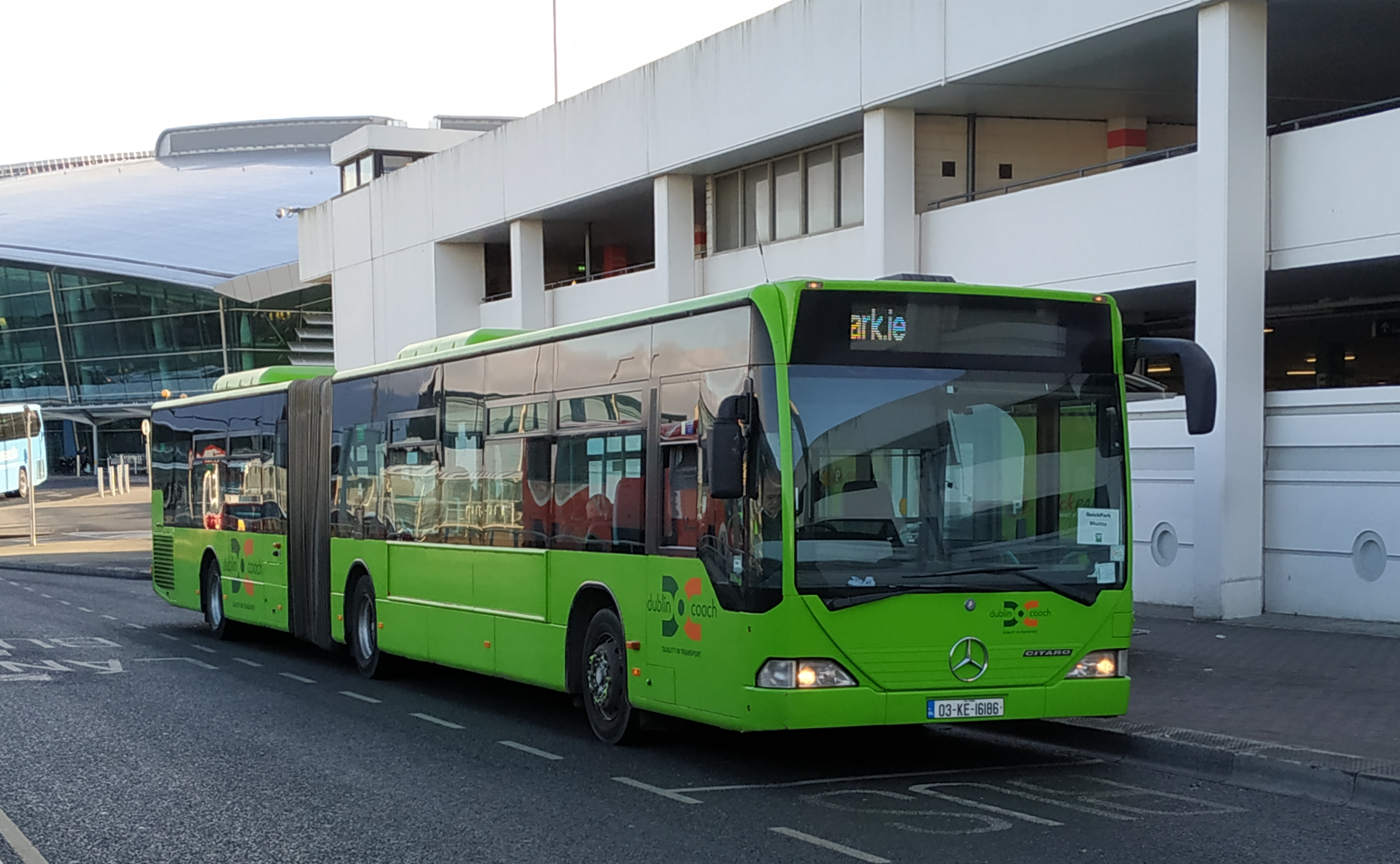
Airport bus

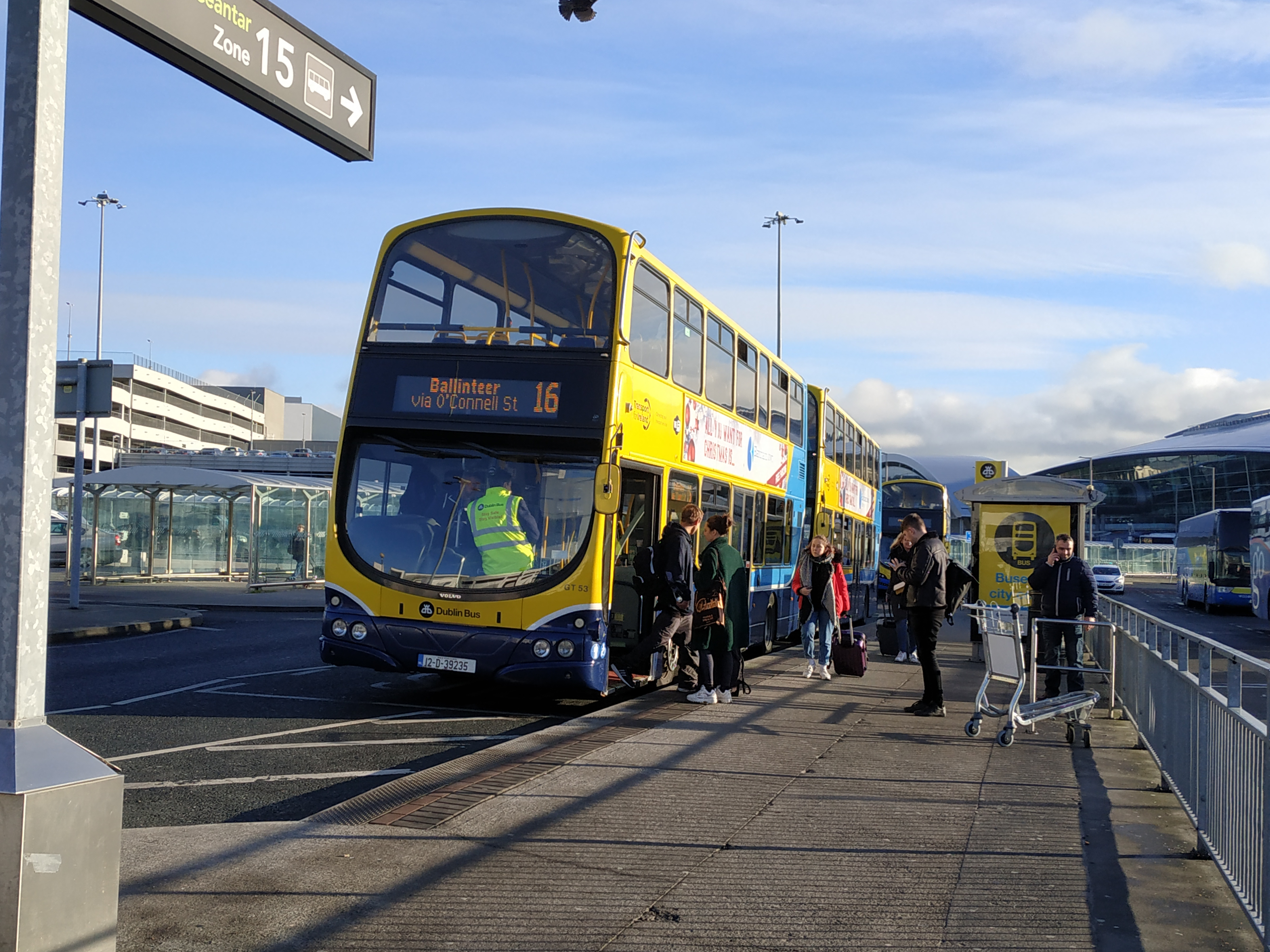
Dublin buses serving the airport

Dublin Airport is located 10 km (6.2 mi) north of the city centre and 2 km (1.2 mi) south of the town of Swords, near the M1 and M50 motorways. There is no rail link to Dublin city centre, and the transport options to the city are taxis, buses and private transport.

=== Car parking ===
DAA operates several car parks at Dublin Airport serving both terminals, offering short-stay and long-stay options. Short term covered parking is available directly adjacent to Terminal 1 and Terminal 2, while two larger long term car parks, Express Red and Holiday Blue, provide shuttle bus transfers to both terminals. Buses run every 10 minutes to the Express Red car park and every 15 minutes to Holiday Blue. Pre-booking online is available at reduced rates compared to turn-up pricing.

=== Bus services ===
Dublin Airport is served by a large network of bus and coach routes, serving both the wider Dublin area and the rest of Ireland. City bus services operated by Dublin Bus and Go-Ahead Ireland link the airport to Dublin city centre and suburban areas as Swords, Santry, Finglas, Glasnevin, Ballymun, Drumcondra, Harold's Cross, Terenure, Rathfarnham, Ballinteer, Malahide, Portmarnock, Sutton, Lusk, Rush and Skerries.

Aircoach offers a number of coach services from the Airport to the Dublin area, serving both the city centre and southside areas including Stillorgan, Leopardstown, Blackrock, Dún Laoghaire and Dalkey.

Dublin Express runs coach services to the city centre via the Port Tunnel, offering interchange with the rail network at Tara Street and Heuston station, the station for trains to destinations such as Cork, Waterford, Limerick and Galway. The company also connects the airport to Rathgar, Rathmines and Terenure in south Dublin.

Dublin Coach operate a route from the airport to Portlaoise via Red Cow Luas and towns in counties Kildare and Laois, as well as a route to Dundrum Luas via Red Cow.

Bus Éireann connect the airport to destinations in counties Louth and Meath such as Drogheda, Navan and Kells, while the company's Expressway division provides long-distance services to Dundalk, Wexford, Ballina, Sligo, Donegal and Letterkenny. Ulsterbus Goldline offer cross-border bus services to Newry and Belfast and services to Derry via either Monaghan and Omagh or Armagh and Cookstown.

Aircoach runs longer distance services to Cork, Belfast and Derry, Citylink offer services to Cork, Limerick, Ennis, Galway, and Castlebar, JJ Kavanagh operate services to Carlow, Limerick, Kilkenny and Waterford, Wexford Bus connects the airport with Wicklow and Wexford, Flightlink connects the airport to Ennis and Killarney, Kearns connects the airport to Tullamore and Birr and John McGinley Coaches runs services to destinations in county Donegal including Annagry and Moville.

=== Taxi ===
Taxis are available at taxi ranks located directly outside of Terminal 1 and Terminal 2.

=== Rail ===
There is no direct rail connection to Dublin Airport. However, Iarnród Éireann (Irish Rail) provide suburban and intercity railway services from Dublin Connolly and Dublin Heuston railway stations, and there are regular bus services from both stations to the airport. Some city bus services serve Drumcondra station, which is on the Connolly to Maynooth railway line while the 102 route connects Dublin Airport to Malahide and Sutton DART stations. Bus services to Busáras/Dublin Connolly and Dublin Heuston railway stations connect with the Red and Green lines of the Luas tram system.

==== Proposed rail link ====
For many years, it was expected that Iarnród Éireann would extend the Dublin Area Rapid Transit (DART) to serve the airport. These plans were replaced with a proposal for an underground metro line, which would run from the city centre to Swords via the airport. The route for the line, initially known as Metro North, was announced in October 2006 and was proposed to connect with several other modes of transport. In 2011, it was announced that the Metro North plan would be deferred due to a lack of funding. A revised proposal, known as Metrolink, was launched in 2018, and received planning permission in 2025. Construction could potentially start in 2027 or 2028 and "all going well" it could be in operation by 2035.

== Accidents and incidents ==
- On 12 June 1967, Aer Turas Flight 612, a Bristol 170 Freighter 31E, crashed while performing a go-around after a failed landing. The two crew died in the crash.
- On 29 November 1975, the Ulster Defence Association planted two bombs inside the arrivals terminal. In this attack, known as the Dublin Airport bombing, one bomb exploded - killing one person and wounding at least eight more. A second bomb was destroyed in a controlled explosion.

== Sources ==
- Bulson, Roy (1969). Irish Pubs of Character. Dublin: Bruce Spicer Ltd. ASIN B000VO990C.
