= Lord Justice Collins =

Lord Justice Collins can refer to:

- Richard Collins, Baron Collins (1842–1911)
- Lawrence Collins (born 1941)

== See also ==
- Andrew Collins (judge) (born 1942), known as Mr Justice Collins
- Justice Collins (disambiguation)
