= Collins Ramusi =

South African politician and lawyer (died 7 June 1996)

Member of the National Assembly
- In office May 1994 – July 1996

Personal details
- Born: Molapatene Collins Ramusi
- Died: 07 June 1996
- Citizenship: South Africa
- Party: African National Congress
- Children: Selaelo, Sekgweng, and Mothibi

Molapatene Collins Ramusi (died June 1996) was a South African politician and lawyer who represented the African National Congress (ANC) in the National Assembly from 1994 until his death in 1996. He was formerly a prominent politician in Lebowa, where he was Minister of the Interior.

== Early life and career ==
Ramusi was from Botlokwa in the Northern Transvaal, though he moved to Pretoria in his youth to find work. He trained as a social worker but later qualified as an attorney, gaining admittance to the Supreme Court of South Africa in 1964.

== Political career ==
=== Lebowa ===
A former member of the anti-apartheid Pan Africanist Congress, Ramusi became involved in the internal politics of the bantustan of Lebowa in the 1970s. Although this participatory approach was unpopular among anti-apartheid activists of the period, he explained his reasoning in 1973, urging a gathering of graduands at Turfloop to become involved in the bantustans:

I'm appealing to you to be prepared to serve the people not theoretically, but practically because the people are suffering. They need doctors, clothes and food. There's hardly water for them. [...] You can shun the people if you want to, but you have no right to refuse to assist us, although this business of homelands is embarrassing in so much that the educated people find it difficult to move freely and with dignity. But what can we do?

Ramusi used his platform in Lebowa to call for the release of political prisoners and to argue against the award of nominal independence to the bantustans, saying on one occasion, "Lebowa believes in freedom as South Africans not as Lebowa citizens". He was Lebowa's Minister of the Interior under Chief Minister Cedric Phatudi, and he also deputised Phatudi as deputy leader of the bantustan's single political party, the Lebowa People's Party. After Phatudi fired him as a minister, the party was temporarily divided in a power struggle between Phatudi and Ramusi, until Ramusi went into exile in the United States.

=== Exile and Parliament ===
While in exile, Ramusi wrote his memoirs with Ruth S. Turner; they were published by Holt in 1989 under the title Soweto, My Love. In the book, he argued in favour of violent resistance to apartheid.

Five years later, in South Africa's first post-apartheid elections in 1994, Ramusi was elected to represent the ANC in the new multi-racial National Assembly. He died of a heart attack in July 1996 while still serving in the seat.

== Personal life ==
Ramusi's first wife was Thabo Mary Jane Morare, a professional nurse, with whom he had three sons: Selaelo, Sekgweng, and Mothibi. Selaelo joined Umkhonto we Sizwe and died in prison in 1979; Ramusi was in exile at the time and was refused entry to South Africa for his burial. Sekgweng, commonly known as Junior, was a civil servant, sports administrator, and soccer player. Ramusi remarried to Esther Ramusi, an American from Chicago, while in exile.
