= Collinstown, County Dublin =

Townland in Ireland, site of Dublin Airport

Coordinates: 53°25′28″N 6°14′52″W

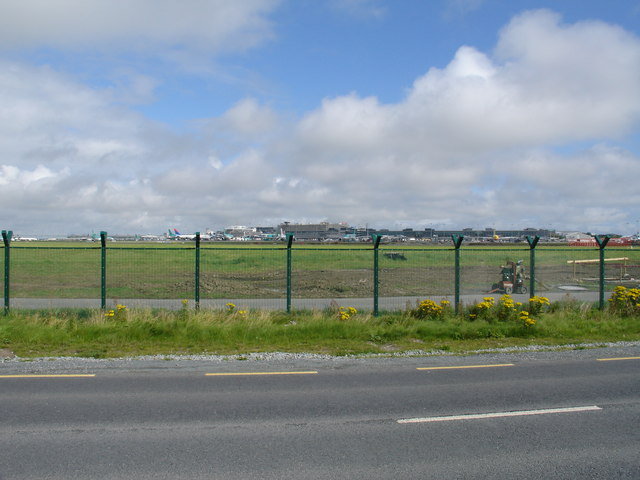
Fencing, along Collinstown Lane, on the south perimeter of Dublin Airport

Collinstown (Irish: Baile Choilín) is a townland in Fingal, County Dublin, roughly 7 km north of Dublin in Ireland. It is in the civil parish of Santry, within the barony of Coolock.

Collinstown townland is approximately 394 acres (1.6 km^{2}) in area. It is entirely within the perimeter of Dublin Airport, which grew out of Collinstown Aerodrome, originally a Royal Air Force station. In the Irish War of Independence, the aerodrome was converted to become Collinstown Camp, used for internment of Irish republicans. Construction of the airport followed, and it expanded over time, spreading into neighbouring administrative areas.
