= Collins O. Airhihenbuwa =

American public health researcher

- Education: University of Tennessee; Tennessee State University
- Scientific career
- Institutions: Georgia State University; Pennsylvania State University; Saint Louis University
- Thesis: Comprehensive health assessment of Iyekuselu District, Bendel State, Nigeria (1983)

Collins O. Airhihenbuwa is a Nigerian public health researcher. He is Director of the Global Research Against Non-communicable Disease (GRAND) Initiative and Professor of Health Management & Policy at Georgia State University.

== Early life and education ==
Airhihenbuwa was born in Nigeria. His parents were both farmers. He started his academic career in business studies at Tennessee State University, before switching to healthcare and eventually working toward a bachelor's degree in health planning. He earned a certificate in health administration at Meharry Medical College. He moved to the University of Tennessee for his graduate research, where he earned a Master of Public Health in 1981 and a PhD in 1983. It was during his doctoral research that he realised how culture and inequality impacted health.

== Research and career ==
From the start of the 1980s Airhihenbuwa was involved with the public health response to the HIV/AIDS epidemic. He joined Pennsylvania State University in 1984 where he worked as Professor of Health Education and Dean for Minority Affairs. Airhihenbuwa spent his sabbatical at the World Health Organization, where he worked in Switzerland, Malawi and Nigeria. In 2000 he was promoted to Professor of Health Education. From 2006 to 2015 Airhihenbuwa served as Head of the Department of Biobehavioral Health. In 2016 he joined Saint Louis University as Dean of the College for Public Health and Social Justice. He moved to Georgia State University as a Professor of Health Management & Policy in 2019. At Georgia State University he joined a commission that looked to improve diversity of the faculty.

His research considers the health of marginalised populations in the United States, with a particular focus on hypertension, diabetes and cancer. At Pennsylvania State University, he started to investigate the higher mortality rates of diseases related to diet in African Americans. His research showed that to improve African American health would require both easy access to healthy food and culturally sensitive education. His work makes use of the PEN-3 cultural model, which includes three main approaches (1) Cultural Identity, (2) Relationships and Expectations, and (3) Cultural Empowerment. He incorporates critical race theory to understand how power and racism impact public health. In 2017 Airhihenbuwa founded U-Rise, a consultancy organisation which combines health and social justice.

He serves on the Executive Board of the University of California, Los Angeles Center for the Study of Racism.

== Awards and honours ==
- 1998 American Association of Health Education Scholar of the Year
- 2006 Pennsylvania State University W. LaMarr Kopp International Achievement Award
- 2011 Society for Public Health Education Mentor Award

== Selected publications ==
- Airhihenbuwa, Collins O.; Phd, Collins O. Airhihenbuwa (1995-04-11). Health and Culture: Beyond the Western Paradigm. SAGE. ISBN 978-0-8039-7156-1.
- Ford, Chandra L.; Airhihenbuwa, Collins O. (2010-04-01). "Critical Race Theory, Race Equity, and Public Health: Toward Antiracism Praxis". American Journal of Public Health. 100 (S1): S30–S35. doi:10.2105/AJPH.2009.171058. ISSN 0090-0036. PMC 2837428. PMID 20147679.
- PhD, Collins O. Airhihenbuwa; PhD, Shiriki Kumanyika; PhD, Tanya D. Agurs; PhD, Agatha Lowe; Saunders, David; MPh, Christiaan B. Morssink (1996-09-01). "Cultural aspects of African American eating patterns". Ethnicity & Health. 1 (3): 245–260. doi:10.1080/13557858.1996.9961793. ISSN 1355-7858. PMID 9395569.
- CO Airhihenbuwa; Webster, J. DeWitt (2004-07-14). "Culture and African contexts of HIV/AIDS prevention, care and support". SAHARA-J: Journal of Social Aspects of HIV/AIDS. 1 (1): 4–13. doi:10.1080/17290376.2004.9724822. ISSN 1813-4424. PMC 11133012. PMID 17600995. S2CID 3128678.
