= Collins Township =

Collins Township may refer to one of the following places within the United States:

- Collins Township, Story County, Iowa
- Collins Township, McLeod County, Minnesota
- Collins Township, St. Clair County, Missouri
- Collins Township, Buffalo County, Nebraska
- Collins Township, Allegheny County, Pennsylvania, a former township now part of Pittsburgh
