= Collins Parker =

Collins Parker (born 21 July 1947) is a judge of the Namibian High Court appointed in 2006 by President Hifikepunye Pohamba.

Collins holds LLB (Hons) from the University of Ghana, LLM from Dalhousie University in Canada and PhD degree from Pacific Western University (United States) and is also accredited by the FAArb (Southern Africa). He previously served as Chief Legal Services and International Cooperation and Coordinator of the SADC Legal Sector and a Judge of the Kingdom of Swaziland Industrial Court. He served as an advocate in Zambia. Parker was one of the counsels for Namibia in the Case concerning Kasikili/Sedudu Island at the International Court of Justice.

He has authored the book Labour Law in Namibia.
