= Justice Collins =

Justice Collins may refer to:

- Gilbert Collins (1846–1920), associate justice of the New Jersey Supreme Court
- Jon R. Collins (1923–1987), associate justice of the Supreme Court of Nevada
- Lawrence Collins, Baron Collins of Mapesbury (born 1941), justice of the Supreme Court of the United Kingdom
- Loren W. Collins (1838–1912), associate justice of the Minnesota Supreme Court
- Lorin C. Collins Jr. (1848–1940), associate justice of the Supreme Court of the Panama Canal Zone
- Samuel Collins (Maine politician) (1923–2012), associate justice of the Maine Supreme Judicial Court
- Stephen R. Collins (1896–1985), associate justice of the Maryland Court of Appeals

== See also ==
- Lord Justice Collins (disambiguation)
- Judge Collins (disambiguation)
