= Collins Archeological District =

Archaeological site in Illinois, United States

- U.S. National Register of Historic Places
- U.S. Historic district
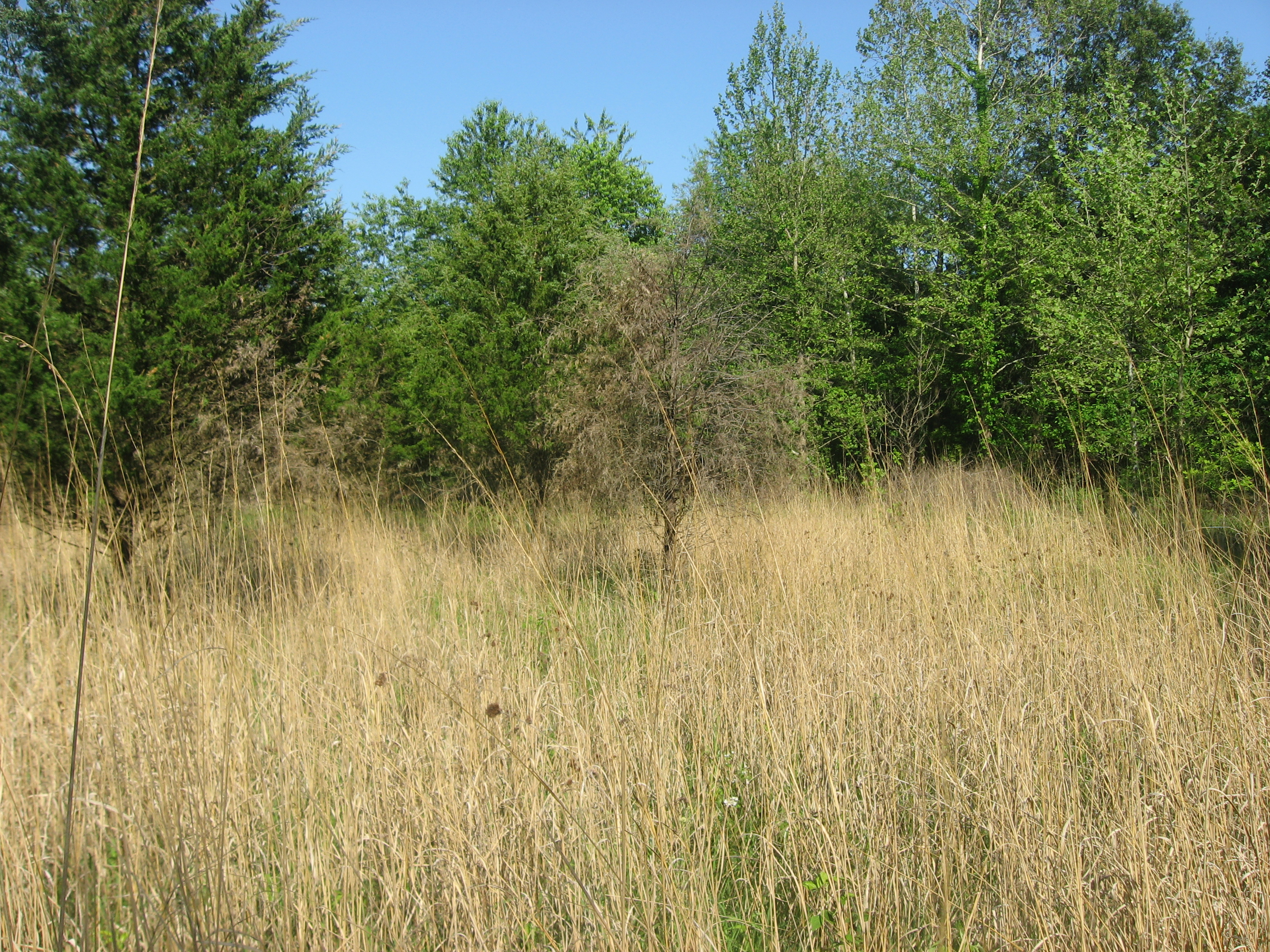

- Location within Illinois Location within the United States
- Location: West of Lake Mingo at Kennekuk County Park, Danville, Illinois
- Coordinates: 40°12′28″N 87°44′32″W
- Area: 113 acres (46 ha)
- NRHP reference No.: 79000872
- Added to NRHP: August 3, 1979

The Collins Archeological District is a pre-Columbian archaeological site located in Kennekuk County Park in Vermilion County, Illinois. The site dates from the Late Woodland period and was used roughly from 900 to 1100 A.D. The core of the site includes two mounds and a ceremonial area. The inhabitants of the region used the site for ceremonial purposes, and the ceremonies conducted at the site were influenced by Mississippian traditions. The site provides evidence of the spread of Mississippian culture from Cahokia to other peoples and regions.

The site was added to the National Register of Historic Places on August 3, 1979.
