= John Collins =

John Collins, or Jon Collins, may refer to:

== Arts and entertainment ==
- John Collins (painter), 18th century British landscape painter
- John Collins (poet) (1742–1808), English orator, singer, and poet
- John Churton Collins (1848–1908), English literary critic
- John H. Collins (director) (1889–1918), American director and screenwriter
- John Collins (jazz guitarist) (1913–2001), American jazz guitarist
- John Collins (cartoonist) (1917–2007), Canadian cartoonist
- Johnny Collins (1938–2009), British folksinger
- John D. Collins (born 1942), British actor known for Allo 'Allo
- John Collins (theatre director) (born 1969), American experimental theater director
- John Collins (Australian musician) (born 1971), bass guitarist for Powderfinger
- John Collins (British musician) (born 1944), musician in the West African music scene

== Military ==
- John Collins (Bengal Army officer) (died 1807), British colonel in the Bengal Native Infantry
- John Collins (VC) (1880–1951), English sergeant who was awarded a Victoria Cross
- John Augustine Collins (1899–1989), Royal Australian Navy officer

== Politics ==
=== American politicians ===
- John Collins (Continental Congress) (1717–1795), Rhode Island delegate to Continental Congress
- John Collins (governor) (1776–1822), American manufacturer and Governor of Delaware
- John Collins (Seattle politician) (1835–1903), American politician and businessman
- John F. Collins (mayor of Providence) (1872–1962), mayor of Providence, Rhode Island, 1939–1941
- John F. Collins (1919–1995), mayor of Boston, Massachusetts, 1960–1968

=== Other politicians ===
- John Collins (died 1597), MP for Hythe
- John Collins (Andover MP) (1624–1711), English academic and politician
- John Collins (Surveyor General) (died 1795), Surveyor General of Provincial Canada
- John Collins (Canadian politician) (1922–2016), physician and politician in Newfoundland, Canada
- John Henry Collins (1880–1952), nationalist politician and solicitor in Northern Ireland

== Religion ==
- John Collins (Independent minister) (c. 1632–1687), English Independent minister
- John J. Collins (bishop) (1856–1934), American-born Catholic bishop in Jamaica
- John Collins (priest) (1905–1982), radical Anglican canon at St Paul's Cathedral, and member of the British Campaign for Nuclear Disarmament
- John A. Collins (chaplain) (1931–2003), Chief of Chaplains of the U.S. Air Force
- John Collins (nuncio) (1889–1961), Irish bishop and diplomat in Liberia
- John T. C. B. Collins (1925–2022), Anglican priest and leading figure in the charismatic movement

== Sports ==
=== Association football ===
- John Collins (footballer, born 1942), English professional footballer
- John Collins (footballer, born 1945), English professional footballer and manager
- John Collins (footballer, born 1949) (1949–2020), Welsh professional footballer
- John Collins (footballer, born 1968), Scottish international footballer and manager

=== Other sports ===
- John Collins (New Zealand cricketer) (1868–1943), New Zealand cricketer
- Shano Collins (John Francis Collins, 1885–1955), American baseball player
- John Collins (Fijian cricketer) (fl. 1895), Fijian cricketer
- John W. Collins (1912–2001), American chess player
- John Collins (rugby union, born 1928), English international rugby union player
- John Collins (rugby union, born 1931) (1931–2017), Welsh rugby union player
- John Collins (rugby union, born 1939) (1939–2007), New Zealand rugby union player
- John Collins (sports executive) (born 1961), COO of the National Hockey League
- John Collins (rower) (born 1989), British rower
- John Collins (basketball) (born 1997), American basketball player in the NBA
- Jon Collins (born 1960s), American basketball player in the 1980s
- Johnny Collins (sprinter), winner of the 2000 4 × 400 meter relay at the NCAA Division I Indoor Track and Field Championships
- John Collins (pole vaulter), 1922 All-American pole vaulter for the Illinois Fighting Illini track and field team

== Other people ==
- John Collins (mathematician) (1625–1683), English mathematician
- John Baptist Collins (died 1794), French pirate
- John Collins (merchant) (died 1795), merchant in Quebec
- John A. Collins (1810–1900), American abolitionist and utopian from Skaneateles Community
- John Collins Covell (1823–1887), American educator and school administrator
- John S. Collins (1837–1928), American Quaker farmer who moved to southern Florida
- John H. Collins (academic) (1902–1981), American classical scholar
- John Collins (British businessman) (born 1941), former head of National Power
- John J. Collins (born 1946), Irish biblical studies scholar
- John Norman Collins (born 1947), perpetrator of the Michigan murders
- John C. Collins (born 1949), American theoretical particle physicist
- John A. Collins (abolitionist) (1810–1879), American abolitionist
- C. John Collins (born 1954), American academic and professor of Old Testament
- Jon Collins (educator), American educator

== Other uses ==
- John Collins (cocktail), an alcoholic beverage

== See also ==
- John Collins-Muhammad (born 1991), American politician
- Jon R. Collins (1923–1987), associate justice of the Supreme Court of Nevada
- Collins (surname)
- Jack Collins (disambiguation)
- John Collings (disambiguation)
- Sean Collins (disambiguation)
- Collins John (born 1985), Dutch footballer
