= Jack Collins =

Jack Collins may refer to:

== Sports ==
- Jack Collins (footballer, born 1904) (1904–1968), Australian rules footballer for Melbourne
- Jack Collins (footballer, born 1910) (1910–1972), Australian rules footballer for Geelong
- Jack Collins (footballer, born 1930) (1930–2008), Coleman Medal winning Australian rules footballer for Footscray
- Jack Collins (footballer, born 1925) (1925–1998), Australian rules footballer for Fitzroy and Essendon
- Jack Collins (1930s footballer), English football winger
- Jack Collins (umpire) (1932–2021), Australian Test cricket umpire

== Other ==
- Jack Collins (politician) (born 1943), American college basketball coach and Speaker of the New Jersey General Assembly
- Jack Collins (actor) (1918–2005), American stage, film and television actor
- John W. Collins (1912–2001), American chess player and teacher
- C. John Collins, a.k.a. Jack Collins, conservative evangelical and fellow of the Discovery

== See also ==
- John Collins (disambiguation)
- Collins (surname)
