= World Junior Chess Championship =

Under-20 chess tournament

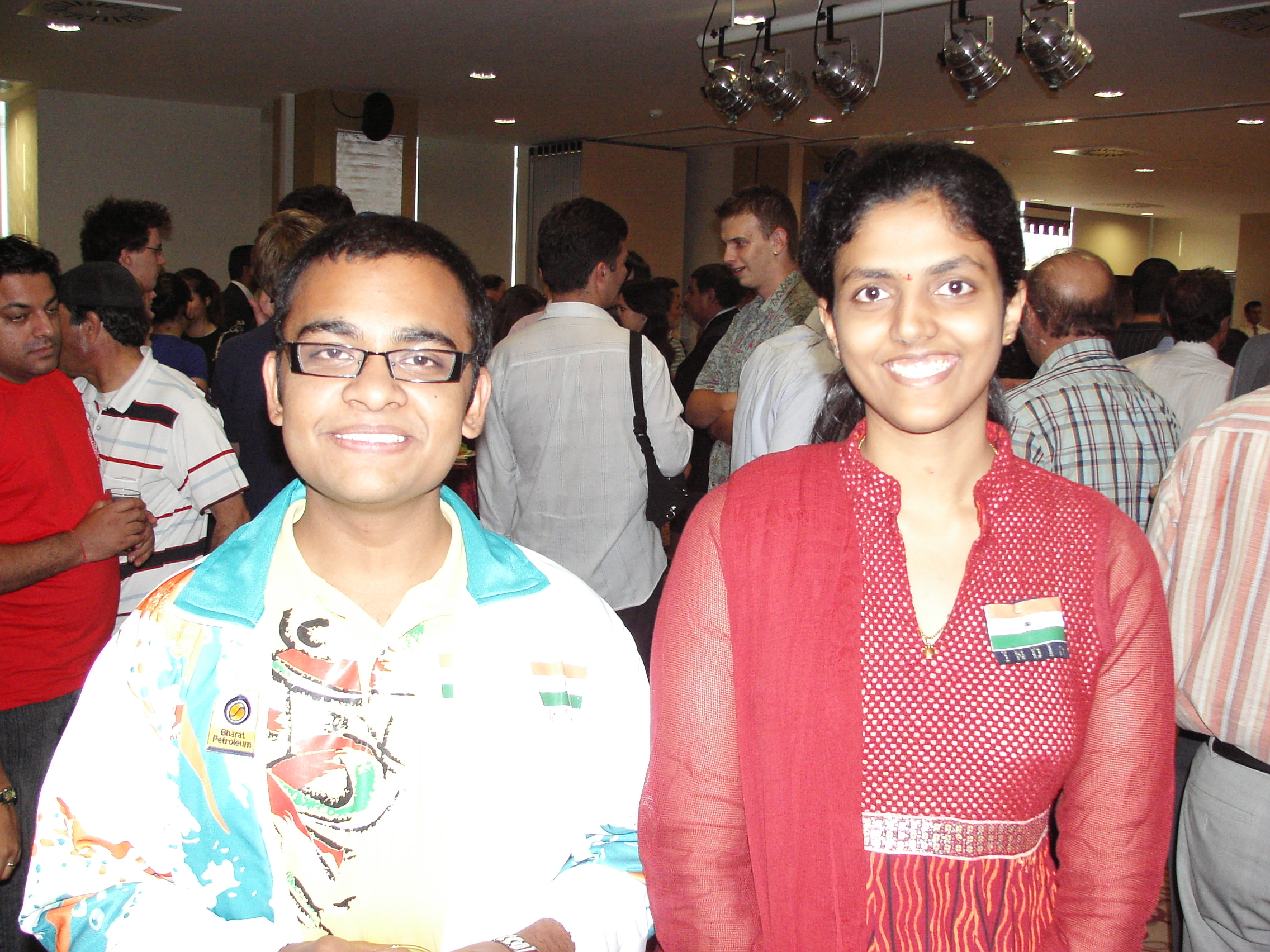
Abhijeet Gupta and Harika Dronavalli – Champions in 2008

The World Junior Chess Championship is an under-20 chess tournament (players must have been under 20 years old on 1 January in the year of competition) organized by the World Chess Federation (FIDE).

The idea was the brainchild of William Ritson-Morry, who organized the 1951 inaugural event to take place in Birmingham, England. Subsequently, it was held every two years until 1973, when an annual schedule was adopted. In 1983, a separate tournament for girls was established.

The first championship was an 11-round Swiss-system tournament. In subsequent championships, the entrants were divided into sections, and preliminary sectional tournaments were used to establish graded finals sections (Final A, Final B, etc.). Since 1975 the tournaments have returned to the Swiss format.

Originally the winner of the open tournament was awarded the title International Master if he had not already received it. Currently the winner receives the Grandmaster title, and the second and third-place finishers receive International Master titles (FIDE 2004, 1.2).

The winner of the girls' tournament receives the Woman Grandmaster title, and the second and third-place finishers receive the Woman International Master titles (FIDE 2004, 1.2). In the Open section, two winners - Zaven Andriasian (2006) and Abdulla Gadimbayli (2022) have earned the GM title directly by winning the event. In the Girls section, five winners - Shen Yang (2006), Vera Nebolsina (2007), Nataliya Buksa (2015), Aleksandra Maltsevskaya (2018), and Polina Shuvalova (2019) have earned the WGM title directly by winning the event.

The youngest winner was Joël Lautier, who won the 1988 edition event at age 15, a record that still stands.

Four winners – Boris Spassky, Anatoly Karpov, Garry Kasparov and Viswanathan Anand – have gone on to win the World Chess Championship.

== World U-20 Championship ==
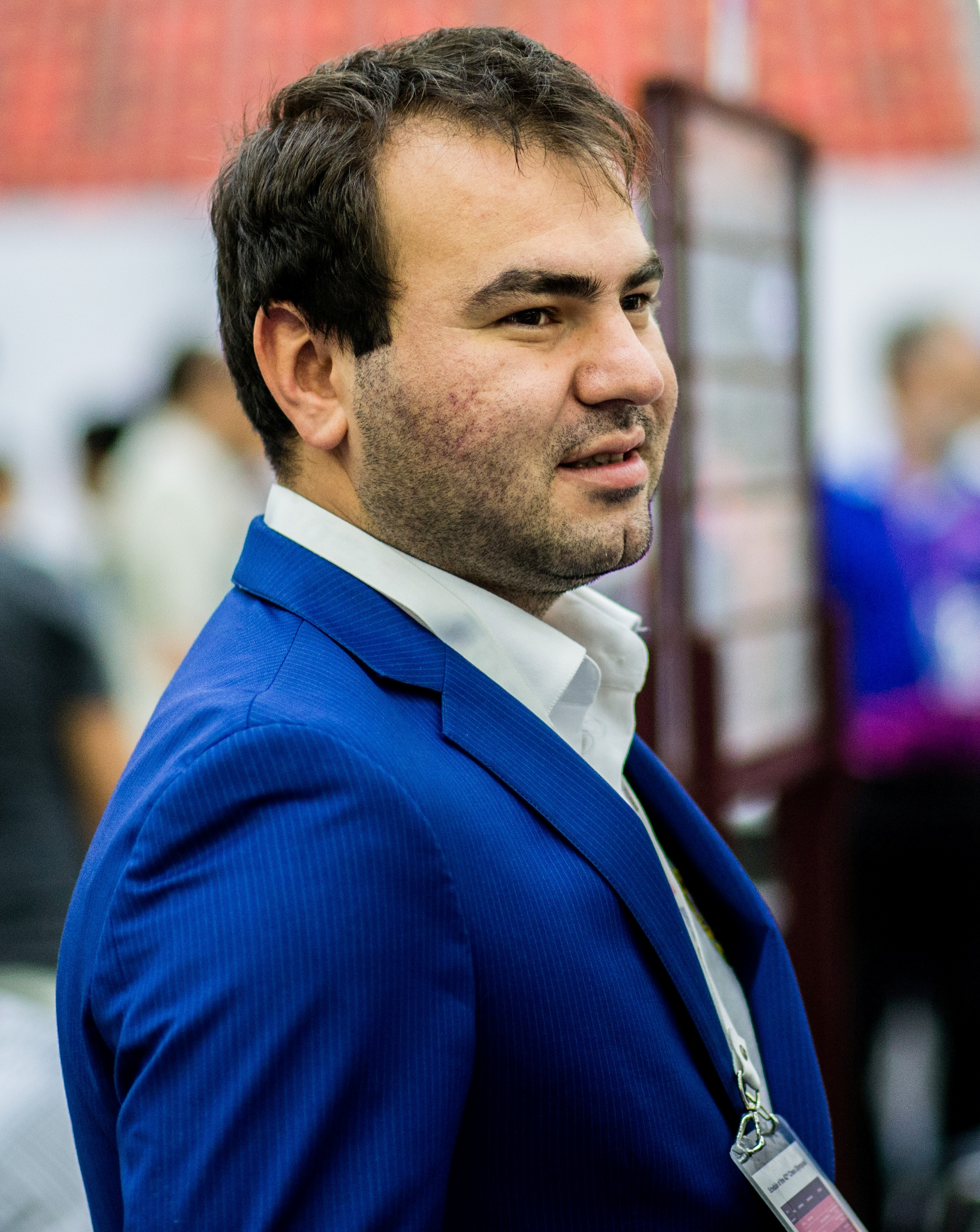
Shakhriyar Mamedyarov is the only male two-time champion.

No.	Year	Location	Champion	Winning country
1	1951	Coventry/Birmingham	Borislav Ivkov	Yugoslavia
2	1953	Copenhagen	Oscar Panno	Argentina
3	1955	Antwerp	Boris Spassky	Soviet Union
4	1957	Toronto	William Lombardy	United States
5	1959	Münchenstein	Carlos Bielicki	Argentina
6	1961	The Hague	Bruno Parma	Yugoslavia
7	1963	Vrnjačka Banja	Florin Gheorghiu	Romania
8	1965	Barcelona	Bojan Kurajica	Yugoslavia
9	1967	Jerusalem	Julio Kaplan	Argentina
10	1969	Stockholm	Anatoly Karpov	Soviet Union
11	1971	Athens	Werner Hug	Switzerland
12	1973	Teesside	Alexander Beliavsky	Soviet Union
13	1974	Manila	Anthony Miles	England
14	1975	Tjentište	Valery Chekhov	Soviet Union
15	1976	Groningen	Mark Diesen	United States
16	1977	Innsbruck	Artur Yusupov	Soviet Union
17	1978	Graz	Sergey Dolmatov	Soviet Union
18	1979	Skien	Yasser Seirawan	United States
19	1980	Dortmund	Garry Kasparov	Soviet Union
20	1981	Mexico City	Ognjen Cvitan	Yugoslavia
21	1982	Copenhagen	Andrei Sokolov	Soviet Union
22	1983	Belfort	Kiril Georgiev	Bulgaria
23	1984	Kiljava	Curt Hansen	Denmark
24	1985	Sharjah	Maxim Dlugy	United States
25	1986	Gausdal	Walter Arencibia	Cuba
26	1987	Baguio	Viswanathan Anand	India
27	1988	Adelaide	Joël Lautier	France
28	1989	Tunja	Vasil Spasov	Bulgaria
29	1990	Santiago	Ilya Gurevich	United States
30	1991	Mamaja	Vladimir Akopian	Soviet Union
31	1992	Buenos Aires	Pablo Zarnicki	Argentina
32	1993	Kozhikode	Igor Miladinović	FR Yugoslavia
33	1994	Matinhos	Helgi Grétarsson	Iceland
34	1995	Halle	Roman Slobodjan	Germany
35	1996	Medellín	Emil Sutovsky	Israel
36	1997	Żagań	Tal Shaked	United States
37	1998	Kozhikode	Darmen Sadvakasov	Kazakhstan
38	1999	Yerevan	Aleksandr Galkin	Russia
39	2000	Yerevan	Lázaro Bruzón	Cuba
40	2001	Athens	Péter Ács	Hungary
41	2002	Goa	Levon Aronian	Armenia
42	2003	Nakhchivan	Shakhriyar Mamedyarov	Azerbaijan
43	2004	Kochi	Pentala Harikrishna	India
44	2005	Istanbul	Shakhriyar Mamedyarov	Azerbaijan
45	2006	Yerevan	Zaven Andriasian	Armenia
46	2007	Yerevan	Ahmed Adly	Egypt
47	2008	Gaziantep	Abhijeet Gupta	India
48	2009	Puerto Madryn	Maxime Vachier-Lagrave	France
49	2010	Chotowa	Dmitry Andreikin	Russia
50	2011	Chennai	Dariusz Świercz	Poland
51	2012	Athens	Alexander Ipatov	Turkey
52	2013	Kocaeli	Yu Yangyi	China
53	2014	Pune	Lu Shanglei	China
54	2015	Khanty-Mansiysk	Mikhail Antipov	Russia
55	2016	Bhubaneswar	Jeffery Xiong	United States
56	2017	Tarvisio	Aryan Tari	Norway
57	2018	Gebze	Parham Maghsoodloo	Iran
58	2019	New Delhi	Evgeny Shtembuliak	Ukraine
59	2022	Cala Gonone	Abdulla Gadimbayli	Azerbaijan
60	2023	Mexico City	Marc'Andria Maurizzi	France
61	2024	Gandhinagar	Kazybek Nogerbek	Kazakhstan
62	2025	Petrovac, Budva	Pranav V	India
63	2026	Greater Caracas	TBA	TBA

== World Women U-20 Championship ==
No.	Year	Location	Champion	Runner-up
1	1982	Senta	Agnieszka Brustman (Poland)	Tatiana Rubzova (Russia)
2	1983	Mexico City	Fliura Khasanova (Soviet Union)	
3	1985	Dobrna	Ketevan Arakhamia (Soviet Union)	Alisa Marić (Serbia)
4	1986	Vilnius	Ildikó Mádl (Hungary)	Svetlana Prudnikova (Soviet Union)
5	1987	Baguio	Camilla Baginskaite (Soviet Union)	
6	1988	Adelaide	Alisa Galliamova (Soviet Union)	Ketevan Arakhamia (Soviet Union)
7	1989	Tunja	Ketino Kachiani (Soviet Union)	Ildikó Mádl (Hungary)
8	1990	Santiago	Ketino Kachiani (Soviet Union)	Aynur Sofiyeva (Soviet Union)
9	1991	Mamaja	Nataša Bojković (Yugoslavia)	Anna-Maria Botsari (Greece)
10	1992	Buenos Aires	Krystyna Dąbrowska (Poland)	Elena-Luminița Cosma (Romania)
11	1993	Kozhikode	Nino Khurtsidze (Georgia)	Ilaha Kadimova (Azerbaijan)
12	1994	Matinhos	Zhu Chen (China)	
13	1995	Halle	Nino Khurtsidze (Georgia)	Eva Repková (Slovakia)
14	1996	Medellín	Zhu Chen (China)	Lenka Ptáčníková (Czech Republic)
15	1997	Żagań	Harriet Hunt (England)	Joanna Dworakowska (Poland)
16	1998	Kozhikode	Hoang Thanh Trang (Vietnam)	Iweta Rajlich (Poland)
17	1999	Yerevan	Maria Kouvatsou (Greece)	Jana Jacková (Czech Republic)
18	2000	Yerevan	Xu Yuanyuan (China)	Olga Zimina (Russia)
19	2001	Athens	Humpy Koneru (India)	Zhao Xue (China)
20	2002	Goa	Zhao Xue (China)	Humpy Koneru (India)
21	2003	Nakhchivan	Nana Dzagnidze (Georgia)	Zeinab Mamedyarova (Azerbaijan)
22	2004	Kochi	Ekaterina Korbut (Russia)	Elisabeth Pähtz (Germany)
23	2005	Istanbul	Elisabeth Pähtz (Germany)	Gu Xiaobing (China)
24	2006	Yerevan	Shen Yang (China)	Hou Yifan (China)
25	2007	Yerevan	Vera Nebolsina (Russia)	Jolanta Zawadzka (Poland)
26	2008	Gaziantep	Harika Dronavalli (India)	Mariya Muzychuk (Ukraine)
27	2009	Puerto Madryn	Soumya Swaminathan (India)	Deysi Cori (Peru)
28	2010	Chotowa	Anna Muzychuk (Slovenia)	Olga Girya (Russia)
29	2011	Chennai	Deysi Cori (Peru)	Olga Girya (Russia)
30	2012	Athens	Guo Qi (China)	Nastassia Ziaziulkina (Belarus)
31	2013	Kocaeli Province	Aleksandra Goryachkina (Russia)	Zhansaya Abdumalik (Kazakhstan)
32	2014	Pune	Aleksandra Goryachkina (Russia)	Sarasadat Khademalsharieh (Iran)
33	2015	Khanty-Mansiysk	Nataliya Buksa (Ukraine)	Alina Bivol (Russia)
34	2016	Bhubaneswar	Dinara Saduakassova (Kazakhstan)	P. V. Nandhidhaa (India)
35	2017	Tarvisio	Zhansaya Abdumalik (Kazakhstan)	Anastasya Paramzina (Russia)
36	2018	Gebze	Aleksandra Maltsevskaya (Russia)	Gulrukhbegim Tokhirjonova (Uzbekistan)
37	2019	New Delhi	Polina Shuvalova (Russia)	Mobina Alinasab (Iran)
38	2022	Cala Gonone	Govhar Beydullayeva (Azerbaijan)	Assel Serikbay (Kazakhstan)
39	2023	Mexico City	Candela Francisco (Argentina)	Carissa Yip (United States)
40	2024	Gandhinagar	Divya Deshmukh (India)	Mariam Mkrtchyan (Armenia)
41	2025	Petrovac, Budva	Anna Shukhman (Russia)	Ayan Allahverdiyeva (Azerbaijan)
42	2026	Greater Caracas	TBA	TBA

== Medal table ==
As of 2025 (62 men and 41 women) (Note: There is one medal (silver, 2023) attributed to a neutral player, Arseniy Nesterov playing under the FIDE flag, as Russian players were not allowed to play under their own flag as part of FIDE's response to the Russian invasion of Ukraine. This medal has not been included on the table.)

Rank	Nation	Gold	Silver	Bronze	Total
1	Russia (RUS)	25	23	21	69
2	India (IND)	9	4	6	19
3	China (CHN)	8	6	6	20
4	United States (USA)	6	3	4	13
5	Yugoslavia (YUG)	6	1	5	12
6	Argentina (ARG)	5	0	2	7
7	Azerbaijan (AZE)	4	4	2	10
8	Kazakhstan (KAZ)	4	1	1	6
9	Armenia (ARM)	3	5	4	12
9	France (FRA)	3	5	4	12
11	Poland (POL)	3	4	4	11
12	Georgia (GEO)	3	2	5	10
13	Hungary (HUN)	2	6	4	12
14	England (ENG)	2	5	4	11
15	Germany (GER)	2	3	0	5
16	Ukraine (UKR)	2	2	3	7
17	Bulgaria (BUL)	2	1	3	6
18	Cuba (CUB)	2	0	0	2
19	Romania (ROM)	1	4	2	7
20	Iran (IRI)	1	2	0	3
21	Greece (GRE)	1	1	2	4
21	Turkey (TUR)	1	1	2	4
23	Israel (ISR)	1	1	1	3
23	Norway (NOR)	1	1	1	3
25	Slovenia (SLO)	1	1	0	2
26	Denmark (DEN)	1	0	1	2
26	Peru (PER)	1	0	1	2
28	Egypt (EGY)	1	0	0	1
28	Iceland (ISL)	1	0	0	1
28	Puerto Rico (PUR)	1	0	0	1
28	Switzerland (SUI)	1	0	0	1
28	Vietnam (VIE)	1	0	0	1
33	Czechoslovakia (TCH)	0	4	0	4
34	Belarus (BLR)	0	3	0	3
35	Netherlands (NED)	0	2	2	4
36	Czech Republic (CZE)	0	2	0	2
36	Uzbekistan (UZB)	0	2	0	2
38	Chile (CHI)	0	1	1	2
39	Colombia (COL)	0	1	0	1
40	Serbia (SRB)	0	0	2	2
41	Austria (AUT)	0	0	1	1
41	Brazil (BRA)	0	0	1	1
41	Indonesia (INA)	0	0	1	1
41	South Africa (RSA)	0	0	1	1
41	Spain (ESP)	0	0	1	1
41	Sweden (SWE)	0	0	1	1
41	Turkmenistan (TKM)	0	0	1	1
41	United Arab Emirates (UAE)	0	0	1	1
Totals (48 entries)		105	101	101	307

== Details by year ==
The main source of reference is indicated beneath each year's entry.

1951 – Coventry and Birmingham, England – (July) – Eighteen players played an 11-round Swiss-system tournament. Borislav Ivkov dominated the tournament with an undefeated 9.5-1.5, 1.5 points ahead of the second-place finisher. Also-rans included future leading grandmasters Bent Larsen (6.5–4.5) and Friðrik Ólafsson (5.5–5.5).

Boys U-20 – 1. Borislav Ivkov (YUG) 2. Malcolm Barker (ENG) 3. R. Cruz (ARG)

--- Kažić, B.M., International Championship Chess: A Complete Record of FIDE Events, Pitman Publishing, 1974, pp. 269–70. ISBN 0-273-07078-9.

1953 – Copenhagen, Denmark – (July) – Twenty players began play in each of two sections, with the top four from each section advancing to the championship final. Oscar Panno and Klaus Darga tied for first in the final with undefeated 5.5-1.5 scores, with Panno taking the title on Sonneborn–Berger points. Former champion Ivkov and Olafsson tied for third and fourth place with even scores, with Ivkov finishing third on tiebreak. Larsen tied for fifth-eighth place with the remaining players at 2.5–4.5, finishing last of the eight finalists on tiebreak.

Boys U-20 – 1. Oscar Panno (ARG) 2. Klaus Darga (FRG) 3. Borislav Ivkov (YUG

Championship Final Results
		1	2	3	4	5	6	7	8	Total
O. Panno	Arg.	X	1/2	1	1	1/2	1/2	1	1	5.5
K. Darga	BRD	1/2	X	1/2	1	1/2	1	1	1	5.5
B. Ivkov	Y	0	1/2	X	1/2	1	1	0	1/2	3.5
F. Olafsson	IS	0	0	1/2	X	0	1	1	1	3.5
J. Penrose	Eng	1/2	1/2	0	1	X	0	1/2	0	2.5
D. Keller	CH	1/2	0	0	0	1	X	1	0	2.5
J. Sherwin	USA	0	0	1	0	1/2	0	X	1	2.5
B. Larsen	Dk	0	0	1/2	0	1	1	0	X	2.5

--- Kažić, B.M., International Championship Chess: A Complete Record of FIDE Events, Pitman Publishing, 1974, pp. 270–71. ISBN 0-273-07078-9.

1955 – Antwerp, Belgium – (July) – There were 24 players in total, comprising an original entry of 23, plus an additional player from the home country to make a more manageable number. The competitors were split into three groups of eight; the representatives of USSR, Argentina and Yugoslavia (the top three teams at the 1954 Olympiad) were seeded into separate groups, and the remainder allocated their group randomly. The top three finishers of each group plus the highest scoring fourth place then went forward to a final ten player all-play-all contest. Surprise casualties at the group stage were John Purdy (Australia) and Ciric (YUG). In the final, future world champion Boris Spassky gave up just two draws to score 8–1, the also-undefeated Edmar Mednis scored 7–2, and Miguel Farre of Spain scored 6.5–2.5. Future grandmasters Lajos Portisch (HUN) (5.5–3.5) and Georgi Tringov (BUL) (5–4) finished fourth and fifth.

Boys U-20 – 1. Boris Spassky (USSR) 2. Edmar Mednis (USA) 3. Miguel Farré (ESP)

--- British Chess Magazine No. 9, Vol. 75 pp. 262–65; Kažić, B.M., International Championship Chess: A Complete Record of FIDE Events, Pitman Publishing, 1974, p. 272. ISBN 0-273-07078-9.

1957 – Toronto, Canada – (August) – Only twelve players from eleven countries competed in a round-robin tournament. William Lombardy won all eleven games, becoming the only player ever to achieve a perfect score in this tournament.

Boys U-20 – 1. William Lombardy (USA), 11/11 2. Mathias Gerusel (FRG), 9 3. Alexander Jongsma (NED), 8.5

		1	2	3	4	5	6	7	8	9	10	11	12	Total
W. Lombardy	U.S.A	X	1	1	1	1	1	1	1	1	1	1	1	11
M. Gerusel	BRD	0	X	1	1	0	1	1	1	1	1	1	1	9
A. Jongsma	Ned.	0	0	X	1/2	1	1	1	1	1	1	1	1	8.5
V. Selimanov	U.S.S.R	0	0	1/2	X	1	1/2	1	1	1	1	1	1	8
R. Cardoso	Phl.	0	1	0	0	X	0	1	1	1	1/2	1	1	6.5
R. Hallerod	Swe.	0	0	0	1/2	1	X	1/2	1	1/2	1/2	1/2	1/2	5
F. Jobin	Can.	0	0	0	0	0	1/2	X	0	1	1	1	1	4.5
J. Aldrete	Mex.	0	0	0	0	0	0	1	X	0	1	1	1	4
T. Makelainen	Fin.	0	0	0	0	0	1/2	0	1	X	1/2	1/2	1	3.5
B. Rabinowitz	S.A.	0	0	0	0	1/2	1/2	0	0	1/2	X	1/2	1/2	2.5
I. Bahgat	Egy.	0	0	0	0	0	1/2	0	0	1/2	1/2	X	1/2	2
P. Bates	Can.	0	0	0	0	0	1/2	0	0	0	1/2	1/2	X	1.5

--- Kažić, B.M., International Championship Chess: A Complete Record of FIDE Events, Pitman Publishing, 1974, pp. 273–74. ISBN 0-273-07078-9.

1959 – Münchenstein, Switzerland – (July–August) – Twenty-six players from all the populated continents competed. Bobby Fischer and Vlastimil Hort, the talented fifteen-year-old who had finished second in the Czechoslovak championship, were not present. The players were divided into three preliminary groups, with the top four finishers from each group competing in the "Final A", a round-robin. Bielecki won with 8.5/12, two points ahead of the second-fourth-place finishers.

Boys U-20 – 1. Carlos Bielecki (ARG) 2-4. Bruno Parma (YUG), David Rumens (ENG), Josif Stefanov (BUL)

--- Kažić, B.M., International Championship Chess: A Complete Record of FIDE Events, Pitman Publishing, 1974, p. 274. ISBN 0-273-07078-9.

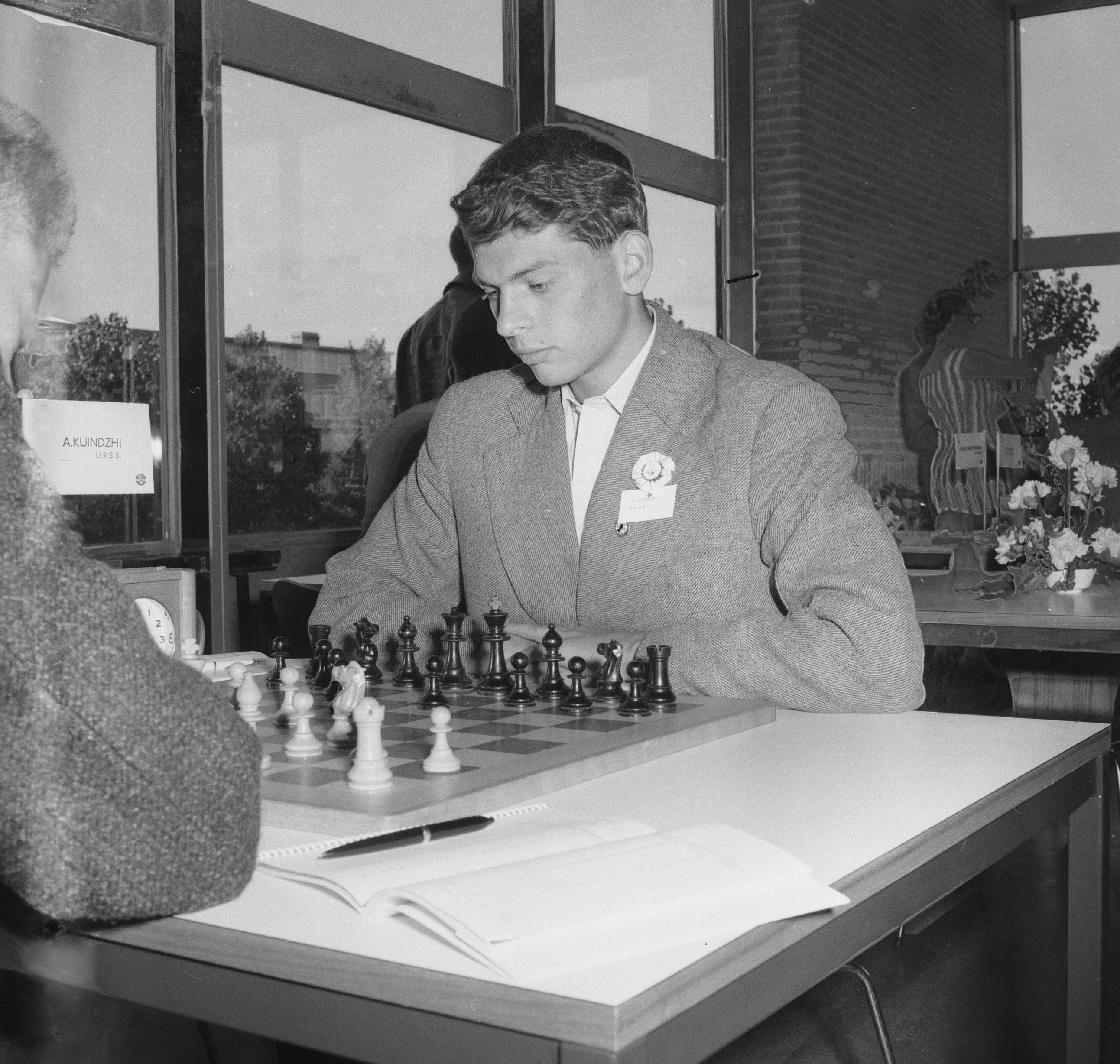
Kuindzhi (USSR) in 1961

1961 – The Hague, Netherlands – (August–September) – Twenty-nine players competed. Raymond Weinstein of the United States had also registered, but was ruled too old to compete. The top three finishers from each of four preliminary groups qualified for Final A. Hort competed this time, scoring 4/6 to tie with three others for first place in Preliminary Group B. Unfortunately, he finished fourth on Sonneborn–Berger tiebreak, so did not qualify for Final A. Final A saw a battle between two future grandmasters, with Bruno Parma of Yugoslavia, who had tied for second the year before, beating Florin Gheorghiu in their individual game and edging out the latter by a half-point (9/11 to Gheorghiu's 8.5). The third-place finisher, Kuindzhi of the Soviet Union, scored 8 points. He beat both Parma and Gheorghiu, but lost to the last place finisher, Thomson of Scotland, who scored only two draws against the rest of the field.

Boys U-20 – 1. Bruno Parma (YUG) 2. Florin Gheorghiu (ROM) 3. Alexander Kuindzhi (USSR)

--- Kažić, B.M., International Championship Chess: A Complete Record of FIDE Events, Pitman Publishing, 1974, pp. 275–76. ISBN 0-273-07078-9.

1963 – Vrnjacka Banja, Yugoslavia – (August–September) – Thirty juniors competed in each of five preliminary groups, with the top two from each group advancing to the A Final. Once again a player who had finished second two years before became the champion, although not without difficulty. Gheorghiu of Romania and Janata tied for first with 7.5/9 scores, with Gheorghiu winning their individual game. They finished three points ahead of the third-place finisher, future grandmaster Bojan Kurajica of Yugoslavia. The match called for the tie to be broken by a four-game match, but this finished with four draws. Because Gheorghiu had the superior Sonneborn–Berger score, he was declared the champion.

Boys U-20 – 1. Florin Gheorghiu (ROM) 2. Michal Janata (CZE) 3. Bojan Kurajica (YUG)

--- Kažić, B.M., International Championship Chess: A Complete Record of FIDE Events, Pitman Publishing, 1974, p. 277. ISBN 0-273-07078-9.

1965 – Barcelona, Spain – (August–September) – Twenty-eight juniors competed in five preliminary groups, with the top two from each group advancing to the A Final. In Preliminary Group A, future grandmasters Vladimir Tukmakov and Raymond Keene tied for second with 2.5/4. Their Sonneborn–Berger scores were identical, and they had drawn their individual game, so they drew lots to break the tie. Tukmakov drew the right number to advance to the Final A. There, experience again proved helpful, with Kurajica, who had been third in Vrnjacka Banja, scoring 6.5/9 to nose out Hartoch and Tukmakov by a half-point. Future World Championship candidate Robert Hübner of West Germany finished with an even score.

Boys U-20 – 1. Bojan Kurajica (YUG) 2. Robert Hartoch (NED) 3. Vladimir Tukmakov (USSR)

--- Kažić, B.M., International Championship Chess: A Complete Record of FIDE Events, Pitman Publishing, 1974, pp. 278–89. ISBN 0-273-07078-9.

1967 – Jerusalem, Israel – (August) – The June Six-Day War made it questionable whether the tournament could be held in Israel at all, and some federations asked for it to be postponed. Although the event went ahead as scheduled, a number of countries chose not to send representatives. Only nineteen players participated, with the top three finishers from each of the three preliminary groups advancing to Final A. Julio Kaplan of Puerto Rico scored 6.5/8, a point ahead of second-place finisher Raymond Keene (who, by virtue of the drawing of lots, had missed out on Final A the previous time). Future World Championship candidate Jan Timman finished third with 5/8. Hübner scored 4.5/8 to finish fourth.

Boys U-20 – 1. Julio Kaplan (PUR) 2. Raymond Keene (ENG) 3. Jan Timman (NED)

--- Kažić, B.M., International Championship Chess: A Complete Record of FIDE Events, Pitman Publishing, 1974, p. 280. ISBN 0-273-07078-9.

1969 – Stockholm, Sweden – (August) – Thirty-eight players played in six preliminary sections, with the top two in each advancing to Final A. Among those who did not qualify for Final A was future World Championship candidate Eugenio Torre of the Philippines, who won Final B with 9/11. Final A was dominated by the rising young Soviet junior Anatoly Karpov (who would become World Champion just six years later), who gave up only two draws (10/11). András Adorján (Hungary) and Urzica (Romania) finished three points behind. The strength of the field is shown by the fact that former Champion Kaplan could only finish fourth with 6.5/11.

Boys U-20 – 1. Anatoly Karpov (USSR) 2. András Adorján (HUN) 3. Aurel Urzica (ROM)

--- Kažić, B.M., International Championship Chess: A Complete Record of FIDE Events, Pitman Publishing, 1974, pp. 281–83. ISBN 0-273-07078-9.

1971 – Athens, Greece – (July–August) – A record forty-four players from forty-three countries participated in six preliminary groups. Werner Hug of Switzerland was the surprise winner, scoring 8.5/11. Two years before, he had only finished fifth in Final C. More highly touted players finished lower: Hungarian Chess Olympiad team member and future World Championship candidate Zoltán Ribli (8/11, second); the strong American player Kenneth Rogoff (7.5/11, third); and Torre and the Soviet Grandmaster Rafael Vaganian, who were among three players scoring 7/11.

Boys U-20 – 1. Werner Hug (SWZ) 2. Zoltán Ribli (HUN) 3. Kenneth Rogoff (USA)

--- Kažić, B.M., International Championship Chess: A Complete Record of FIDE Events, Pitman Publishing, 1974, p. 283. ISBN 0-273-07078-9.

1973 – Teesside, England – (July–August) – A record fifty players from forty-eight countries competed in two preliminary Swiss-system tournaments; the top six from each qualified for Final A. The favorite, Alexander Beliavsky of the Soviet Union, won Final A with 8.5/11 despite losing to both of the English players. Tony Miles of England finished a half-point behind. There was a three-way tie for third at 7.5/11 among Michael Stean (England), Larry Christiansen (United States), and Slavoljub Marjanović of Yugoslavia, with Stean taking third on tiebreak.

Boys U-20 – 1. Alexander Beliavsky (USSR) 2. Tony Miles (ENG) 3. Michael Stean (ENG)

--- Kažić, B.M., International Championship Chess: A Complete Record of FIDE Events, Pitman Publishing, 1974, pp. 285–86. ISBN 0-273-07078-9.

1974 – Manila, Philippines – (August) – This was the first championship since the switch to an annual format. Tony Miles, who had finished second the year before, won, scoring 7/9 in the A Final. Dieks, Marjanović, and Schneider tied for second-fourth at 5.5/9.

Boys U-20 – 1. Tony Miles (ENG) 2–4. Roy Dieks (NED), S. Marjanović (YUG), Schneider (SWE)

--- Chess Informant, Volume 18, Sahovski Informator, 1975, p. 258.

1975 – Tjentiste, Yugoslavia – (July) – Set in the mountains about 100 miles north of Dubrovnik, the small town was the scene of World War II's Battle of the Sutjeska. Dr. Max Euwe laid a wreath on the war memorial at the opening ceremony. The tournament was organised at the last minute by the Yugoslav Chess Federation after the Puerto Ricans withdrew their early offer, due to mounting financial pressure. Winner Valery Chekhov played skilfully throughout, scoring an undefeated 10-3 for a deserved victory; he had recently finished second in the Moscow senior championship. Larry Christiansen finished a half-point behind. He had a winning adjournment against the Soviet, but was less well prepared for the resumption and allowed it to fizzle out to a draw. The Englishman Jonathan Mestel managed a top three finish despite being one of the younger competitors. Ventzislav Inkiov of Bulgaria, like Mestel, scored 9–4, but due to an inferior Bucholz tie-splitting score, had to settle for fourth place. Forty-eight players took part including future grandmasters Jaime Sunye Neto and Murray Chandler. It was the first World Junior to feature a 13-round Swiss format.

Boys U-20 – 1. Valery Chekhov (USSR) 2. Larry Christiansen (USA) 3. Jonathan Mestel (ENG)

--- CHESS magazine Vol. 41 October p. 6; Chess Informant, Vol. 20, p. 262.

1976 – Groningen, Netherlands – (December 21, 1976 – January 5, 1977) – Mark Diesen exceeded expectations, scoring 10–3 to win the event. Some credited Diesen's success to the considerable coaching and adjournment skills of his second, GM Lubomir Kavalek, who later helped Nigel Short beat Anatoly Karpov and reach a World Championship match against Garry Kasparov. This year the tournament was combined with the European Junior Chess Championship. Ľubomír Ftáčnik, who finished half a point behind Diesen, was the top-placed European and thereby became the European Junior Champion. Nir Grinberg of Israel finished third with a 9–4 score. Tied for 4th-8th places were Daniel Cámpora from Argentina, Leslie Leow from Singapore, Marcel Sisniega from Mexico and Evgeny Vladimirov from the USSR. Also in the chasing pack were Ian Rogers (AUS), Krum Georgiev (BUL), Attila Grószpéter (HUN), Jonathan Mestel (ENG), Petar Popović (YUG), Reynaldo Vera (CUB), Murray Chandler (NZL) and Margeir Petursson (ISL).

Boys U-20 – 1. Mark Diesen (USA) 2. Ľubomír Ftáčnik (CZE) 3. Nir Grinberg (ISR)

--- British Chess Magazine No. 5, Vol. 97 p. 222; Chess Informant, Vol. 23, p. 258

1977 – Innsbruck, Austria – (September 4–19) – Artur Yusupov, a 17-year-old economics student at Moscow University, won the event with 10.5 points out of 13. Second-placed Zapata, a point behind, was also studying economics, at the University of Bogotá. Yusupov's second was the Russian IM Mark Dvoretsky and their alliance heralded the start of a long-running and mutually beneficial relationship. Marcel Sisniega of Mexico hired experienced Soviet GM Vasiukov to be his second and it may have boosted his performance, but not enough to make a difference to the medals. Petar Popović scored 8.5 points for the bronze medal. Also challenging for honours were Skembris of Greece, Fries-Nielsen of Denmark and Vera of Cuba, who lost out to Popović on tie-break.

Boys U-20 – 1. Artur Yusupov (USSR) 2. Alonso Zapata (COL) 3. Petar Popović (YUG)

--- British Chess Magazine No. 11, Vol. 97 pp. 481–90; Chess Informant, Vol. 24, p. 264

1978 – Graz, Austria – (September 2–18) – Yusupov narrowly failed to win the tournament for a second year in succession, but could be pleased that his friend Sergei Dolmatov captured the title. Both are students of Mark Dvoretsky.

Boys U-20 – 1. Sergey Dolmatov (USSR), 10.5/13 2. Artur Yusupov (USSR), 10 3. Jens Ove Fries-Nielsen (DEN), 9

--- British Chess Magazine No. 3, Vol. 99 p. 121; Chess Informant, Vol. 26, p. 266

1979 – Skien, Norway – (July 27 – August 10) – The first three finishers were expected to do well, but disappointing was the form of the highly rated Artur Yusupov, who only scored 7.5-5.5, tying for 12th-17th out of 56 players. Among the chasing pack were James Plaskett, Margeir Petursson, Ivan Morovic and Attila Grószpéter.

Boys U-20 – 1. Yasser Seirawan (USA), 10/13 2. Alexander Chernin (USSR), 9.5 3. Predrag Nikolić (YUG), 8.5

--- British Chess Magazine No. 11, Vol. 99 p. 551; Chess Informant, Vol. 28, p. 291

1980 – Dortmund, Germany – 1. Garry Kasparov (URS), 10.5/13 2. Nigel Short (ENG), 9 3–5. Iván Morovic (CHI), A. Negulescu (ROM), K. Bischoff (FRG) 8.5

--- Chess Informant, Vol. 30, p. 295

1981 – Mexico City, Mexico – 1. Ognijen Cvitan (YUG), 10.5/13 2. Jaan Ehlvest (URS), 10 3. Nigel Short (ENG), 9

--- Chess Informant, Vol. 32, p. 311

1982 – Copenhagen, Denmark – 1. Andrei Sokolov (URS), 10/13 2. Igor Stohl (CSR), 9 3–7. Joel Benjamin (USA), Iván Morovic (CHI), Curt Hansen (DEN), Nigel Short (ENG), Milos (BRS), 8.5

--- Chess Informant, Vol. 34, p. 346

1982 – Senta, Yugoslavia – The inaugural Girls' World Championship attracted 21 participants from 17 countries. Agnieszka Brustman took the title with 8.5/11, a half a point ahead of Tatiana Rubzova. Maia Chiburdanidze attended the tournament as a spectator.

Girls U-20 – 1. Agnieszka Brustman (POL) 2. Tatiana Rubzova (URS) 3–4. Marta Kovacs (HUN), Biljana Verus (YUG)

--- British Chess Magazine No. 8, Vol. 102 p. 352

1983 – Belfort, France – 1. Kiril Georgiev (BUL), 11.5/13 2. Valery Salov (URS), 10.5 3. Ahmed Saeed (UAE), 9

--- Chess Informant, Vol. 36, p. 344

1984 – Kiljava – 1. Curt Hansen (DEN), 10.5/13 2. Alexey Dreev (URS), 10 3–4. Kiril Georgiev (BUL), Thorsteins (ISL) 9

--- Chess Informant, Vol. 38, p. 381

1985 – Sharjah, United Arab Emirates – 1. Maxim Dlugy (USA), 10/13 2. Pavel Blatny (CZE), 9 3. Josef Klinger (AUT), 9

--- Chess Informant, Vol. 40, p. 387

1986 – Gausdal, Norway – 1–2. Walter Arencibia (CUB), Simen Agdestein (NOR), 9.5/13 3–5. Ferdinand Hellers (SWE), Evgeny Bareev (URS), Josef Klinger (AUT), 9

--- Chess Informant, Vol. 42, p. 400

1987 – Baguio, Philippines – 1. Viswanathan Anand (IND), 10/13 2. Vasyl Ivanchuk (URS), 9.5 3–4. Grigory Serper (URS), Patrick Wolff (USA), 9

--- Chess Informant, Vol. 44, p. 385

1988 – Adelaide, Australia – 1–4. Joël Lautier (FRA), Vasyl Ivanchuk (URS), Grigory Serper (URS), Boris Gelfand (URS), 9/13

--- Chess Informant, Vol. 46, p. 448

1989 – Tunja, Colombia – (August 15–31) – Due to the drug wars then raging in Colombia, some countries, including the British Chess Federation, boycotted the event. Vasil Spasov of Bulgaria was the surprise winner of the boys/open event, benefiting from a slip by his closest rival, Jacek Gdański of Poland. Gdanski managed to lose his last 2 games to throw away a 1½ point lead. Consequently, his earlier loss to Spasov was decisive in the tie-break. Sharing 3rd-5th with Swede Richard Wessman were the Soviets, Alexey Dreev and Mikhail Ulibin. Slightly off the pace were Alexei Shirov (1 point behind) and Zsuzsa Polgar (2 points behind).

Boys/Open U-20 – 1. Vasil Spasov (BUL), 9.5/13 2. Jacek Gdański (POL), 9.5 3. Richard Wessman (SWE), 9.

Girls U-20 – 1. Ketino Kachiani (USSR) 2. Ildikó Mádl (HUN) 3. Alisa Galliamova (USSR).

--- CHESS magazine Vol 54. November p. 5; Chess Informant, Vol. 48, p. 456

1990 – Santiago, Chile – 1. Ilya Gurevich (USA), 10.5/13 2. Alexei Shirov (URS), 10.5 3. Vladimir Akopian (URS), 9.5

--- Chess Informant, Vol. 50, p. 371

1991 – Mamaia, Romania – (August) – The tournament had to be put together in hasty fashion when the planned hosts (the Chilean Chess Federation) dropped out at the last minute. Despite this setback, the proceedings went without any serious hitch and the players appreciated the excellent conditions and sound organising skills of the Romanian officials. Hot favourites for a clean sweep in the Boys/Open U-20 event were the Soviets Vladimir Akopian, Sergei Tiviakov and Mikhail Ulibin. It turned out that all three were in good form and the medals were divided between them, following a tie-break to separate the top two. The Girls U-20 event was a two-horse race between Bojkovic of Yugoslavia and Botsari of Greece, the Yugoslav girl winning out by a half point:

Boys U-20 – 1. Vladimir Akopian (USSR), 10.5/13 2. Mikhail Ulibin (USSR), 10.5 3. Sergei Tiviakov (USSR), 8.5.

Girls U-20 – 1. Nataša Bojković (YUG), 10/13 2. Anna-Maria Botsari (GRE), 9.5 3. Maja Koen (BUL), 9.

--- CHESS magazine Vol 56. December pp. 16-18; Chess Informant, Vol. 52, p. 364

1992 – Buenos Aires, Argentina (October) – 1. Pablo Zarnicki (ARG), 10/13 2. Vadim Milov (ISR), 10 3–8. Michelakis (SAF), O. Danielian (ARM), Dimitri Reinderman (NED), Miroslav Marković (FIDE), Egger (CHI), Rasik (CFSR), 8.5

--- Chess Informant, Vol. 56, p. 371

1993 – Kozhikode, India – (November – December) – Top seed in the Boys / Open event, Matthew Sadler of England, led with the Czech Republic's Vlastimil Babula for much of the tournament. With both players facing top quality opposition each round, the pressure finally became too great and both failed at the final hurdle in their quest for the gold medal. Sadler also suffered from serious and frequent time trouble. This strong event contained many players who went on to become top-flight grandmasters; Alexander Onischuk, Christian Gabriel, Vladislav Tkachiev and Peter-Heine Nielsen were just four of the strong finishers not amongst the medals. Swede Jonas Barkhagen also played some enterprising chess, but was just unable to keep up with the leading group. In the Girls event, Armenian Elina Danielian, Krystina Dabrowska of Poland and Adrienn Csőke of Hungary were among those challenging for the medals. FIDE President Florencio Campomanes attended the closing ceremony and announced a new directive that assured future winners of the Boys / Open event an automatic Grandmaster title.

Boys U-20 – 1. Igor Miladinović (YUG), 9.5/13 2. Vlastimil Babula (CZE), 9 3. Sergei Rublevsky (RUS), 9.

Girls U-20 – 1. Nino Khurtsidze (GEO) 2. Ilaha Kadimova (AZE) 3. Mekhri Ovezova (TKM).

--- CHESS magazine Vol 58. March pp. 20-22; Chess Informant, Vol. 59, p. 395

1994 – Matinhos, Brazil (November) – 1. Helgi Grétarsson (ISL), 9.5/13 2. Sofia Polgar (HUN), 9 3–7. Giovanni Vescovi (BRA), Mariano (PHI), Kumaran (ENG), Hugo Spangenberg (ARG), Ch. Gabriel (GER), 8.5

--- Chess Informant, Vol. 61, p. 417

1995 – Halle, Germany (November–December) – There were 80 entrants in the Boys / Open section, representing nearly 70 countries. The Girls' event had 66. Giovanni Vescovi of Brazil was another star performer in the Boys' section, narrowly missing out on a medal. The Girls' category was even more closely contested with second, third and fourth places being decided on tie-break; Natalia Zhukova was the unlucky runner-up.

Boys U-20 – 1. Roman Slobodjan (GER), 10/13 2. Alexander Onischuk (UKR), 10 3. Hugo Spangenberg (ARG), 9.5.

Girls U-20 – 1. Nino Khurtsidze (GEO) 2. Eva Repkova (SVK) 3. Corina Peptan (ROM).

--- CHESS magazine Vol 60. March pp. 46-48; Chess Informant, Vol. 64, p. 360

1996 – Medellín, Colombia (November) – 1. Emil Sutovsky (ISR), 10/13 2–3. Zhang Zhong (CHN), Zoltan Gyimesi (HUN), 9

--- Chess Informant, Vol. 68, p. 363

1997 – Zagan, Poland (July 13–27) – Most of the top players were able to make it, with the exception of Antoaneta Stefanova in the Girls' event; she had reportedly fallen out with the Bulgarian Chess Federation. Tal Shaked, the winner of the Open/Boys' section, secured the title on tie-break; top seed was Alexander Morozevich. Other promising young players in attendance included Vladimir Baklan, Hristos Banikas and Sergei Movsesian. In the Girls' event, Corina Peptan started as the top seed but was not in her best form. Results were as follows:

Boys U-20 – 1. Tal Shaked (USA), 9.5/13 2. Vigen Mirumian (ARM), 9.5 3. Hristos Banikas (GRE), 9.

Girls U-20 – 1. Harriet Hunt (ENG) 2. Joanna Dworakowska (POL) 3. Tatiana Vasilevich (UKR).

--- CHESS magazine Vol 62. October pp. 28-31, 34-35; Chess Informant, Vol. 70, p. 377

1998 – Calcutta, India (November–December) – 1. Darmen Sadvakasov (KAZ), 10.5/13 2. Zhang Zhong (CHN), 9.5 3–4.Hristos Banikas (GRE), Đào Thiên Hải (VIE), 9

--- Chess Informant, Vol. 74, p. 382

1999 – Yerevan, Armenia (November) – 1. Aleksandr Galkin (RUS), 10.5/13 2. Rustam Kasimdzhanov (UZB), 10 3–4.Karen Asrian (ARM), Lev Aronian (ARM), 9

--- Chess Informant, Vol. 76, p. 353

2000 – Yerevan, Armenia (November) – 1. Lázaro Bruzón (CUB), 10/13 2–8. Kamil Mitoń (POL), Karen Asrian (ARM), Gershon (ISR), D. Solak (YUG), Simutowe (ZAM), Bunzmann (GER), Vladimir Malakhov (RUS), 8.5

--- Chess Informant, Vol. 80, p. 395

2001 – Athens, Greece (August) – 1. Péter Ács (HUN), 10/13 2. Merab Gagunashvili (GEO), Lev Aronian (ARM), 9.5

--- Chess Informant, Vol. 82, p. 355

2002 – Goa, India – 1. Lev Aronian (ARM), 10/13 2. Luke McShane (ENG) 9.5 3. Surya Sekhar Ganguly (IND) 9.0.

2003 – Nakhchivan, Azerbaijan (November) – 1. Shakhriyar Mamedyarov (AZE), 10/13 2. S. Azarov (BLR), 9.5 3–7. A. Zubov (UKR), K. Guseinov (AZE), Vugar Gashimov (AZE), V. Bachin (RUS), Erenburg (ISR), 8.5

--- Chess Informant, Vol. 88, pp. 350-51

2004 – Kochi, India (November–December) – 1. Pendyala Harikrishna (IND), 10/13 2–3. Tigran L. Petrosian (ARM), Zhao Jun (CHN), 9.5

--- Chess Informant, Vol. 92, p. 375

2005 – Istanbul, Turkey (November)

Boys U-20 – 1. Shakhriyar Mamedyarov (AZE), 10.5/13 2. Ferenc Berkes (HUN), 9.5 3. Evgeny Alekseev (RUS), 9

Girls U-20 – 1. Elisabeth Pähtz (GER), 10 2. Gu Xiaobing (CHN), 9.5 3. Beata Kądziołka (POL) 9.

2006 – Yerevan, Armenia (October 2–17)

Boys U-20 – 1. Zaven Andriasian (ARM), 9.5/13 2. Nikita Vitiugov (RUS), 9 3. Yuriy Kryvoruchko (UKR), 9

Girls U-20 – 1. Shen Yang (CHN), 9/13 2. Hou Yifan (CHN), 9 3. Salome Melia (GEO), 9.

2007 – Yerevan, Armenia (October)

Boys U-20 – 1. Ahmed Adly (EGY), 10/13 2. Ivan Popov (RUS), 9.5 3. Wang Hao (CHN), 9

Girls U-20 – 1. Vera Nebolsina (RUS), 10/13 2. Jolanta Zawadzka (POL), 9.5 3. Salome Melia (GEO), 9.5.

2008 – Gaziantep, Turkey (August 2–16)

Boys U-20 – 1. Abhijeet Gupta (IND), 10/13 2. Parimarjan Negi (IND), 9.5 3-7. Arik Braun (GER), David Howell (ENG), Eltaj Safarli (AZE), Hou Yifan (CHN), Bassem Amin (EGY), 9

Girls U-20 – 1. Harika Dronavalli (IND), 10.5/13 2-5. Mariya Muzychuk (UKR), Kübra Öztürk (TUR), Mary Ann Gomes (IND), Nazí Paikidze (GEO), 9.

2009 – Puerto Madryn, Argentina – 1. Maxime Vachier-Lagrave (FRA), 10.5/13 2. Sergei Zhigalko (BEL), 10.5 3. Michał Olszewski (POL) 9.

2010 – Chotowa, Poland (August 2–17)

Boys U-20 – 1. Dmitry Andreikin (RUS), 10.5 2. Sanan Sjugirov (RUS), 10 3. Dariusz Świercz (POL), 9

Girls U-20 – 1. Anna Muzychuk (SLO), 11/13 2. Olga Girya (RUS), 10.5 3. Padmini Rout (IND), 10.

2011 – Chennai, India (August 1–16)

Boys U-20 – 1. Dariusz Świercz (POL), 10.5/13 2. Robert Hovhannisyan (ARM), 10.5 3. Sahaj Grover (IND), 9.5

Girls U-20 – 1. Deysi Cori (PER), 11/13 2. Olga Girya (RUS), 10.5 3. Nazí Paikidze (GEO), 9.5.

2012 – Athens, Greece – 1. Alexander Ipatov (TUR), 10/13 2. Richárd Rapport (HUN), 10 3. Ding Liren (CHN) 9.

2013 – Kocaeli, Turkey (September 12–27)

Boys U-20 – 1. Yu Yangyi (CHN), 11/13 2. Alexander Ipatov (TUR), 10.5 3. Vidit Santosh Gujrathi (IND) 9.5.

Girls U-20 – 1. Alexandra Goryachkina (RUS), 10.5/13 2. Zhansaya Abdumalik (KAZ), 9.5 3. Alina Kashlinskaya (RUS), 9.0.

2014 – Pune, India (October 5–20) 19-year-old Lu Shanglei of China won with 10–3, edging out his countryman, 15-year-old prodigy Wei Yi; the top-rated player Vladimir Fedoseev (2661) of Russia; and Jan-Krzysztof Duda of Poland by half a point. The top finishers (on tiebreak) were:

Boys U-20 – 1. Lu Shanglei (CHN), 10/13 2. Wei Yi (CHN), 9.5 3. Vladimir Fedoseev (RUS), 9.5.

2015 – Khanty-Mansisyk, Russia (September 2–15) In the Open section, Mikhail Antipov won with 10.0/13, edging out Jan-Krzysztof Duda on the third tiebreak criteria. Matthias Bluebaum finished in clear third place with 9.0/13. In the Girls section, WFM Nataliya Buksa won clear first with 10.0/13, earning the WGM title. WIM Alina Bivol earned the silver medal, tying with Zhansaya Abdumalik (Bronze medal) with 9.5/13.

2016 – Bhubaneswar, India (August 8–21) In the Open section, Jeffery Xiong won clear first place with 10.5/13. Vladislav Artemiev earned the silver medal with 9.5/13, while S.L. Narayanan earned the bronze medal with 9.0/13, edging out FM Xu Yi on the second tiebreak criteria. In the Girls section, top seeded WGM Dinara Saduakassova won the gold medal with 9.5/13, while Indian WIM P. V. Nandhidhaa (Silver medal) and WIM Dinara Dordzhieva (Bronze medal) tied for second place with 9.0/13.

2017 – Tarvisio, Italy (November 13–25) The event was moved from 13 rounds back to 11. In the Open section, three players tied for first place with 8.5/11 - Aryan Tari (Gold), Manuel Petrosyan (Silver), and Aravindh Chithambaram (Bronze), with medals awarded based on the second tiebreak criteria. In the Girls section, top seed IM Zhansaya Abdumalik earned clear first with 9.5/11. WGM Anastasya Paramzina earned clear second with 8.5/11. FM Jennifer Yu earned the bronze medal and an IM/WGM norm with 8.0/11, edging out WGM Stavroula Tsolakidou and WGM Gulrukhbegim Tokhirjonova on tiebreak.

2018 – Gebze, Kocaeli, Turkiye (September 5–15) In the Open section, top seed Parham Maghsoodloo earned clear first place with 9.5/11. Three players tied for second place - Abhimanyu Puranik (Silver medal), IM Sergei Lobanov (Bronze medal, GM norm), and Andrey Esipenko. In the Girls section, untitled Aleksandra Maltsevskaya earned the gold medal and the WGM title, edging out WGM Gulrukhbegim Tokhirjonova on tiebreak with 8.5/11. Five players tied for third place with 8.0/11, with WIM Nino Khomeriki earning the bronze medal.

2019 – New Delhi, India (October 15–25) In the Open section, Evgeny Shtembuliak earned clear first place with 9.0/11, while Shant Sargsyan earned clear second place with 8.5/11, and Aram Hakobyan earned clear third place with 8.0/11. In the Girls section, WIM Polina Shuvalova earned the gold medal and the WGM title with 9.5/11, while WIM Mobina Alinasab earned the silver medal with 9.0/11. There was a three-way tie for third place on 8.0/11, with WIM Elizaveta Solozhenkina earning the bronze medal.

2020 – Event not held

2021 – Event not held

2022 – Cala Gonon-Dorgali, Italy (October 12–22) In the Open section, there was a 5-way tie for first place with 8.0/11, between: IM Abdulla Gadimbayli (Gold medal, GM title), Adam Kozak (Silver medal), IM Nikolozi Kacharava (Bronze medal), Francesco Sonis, and Leon Luke Mendonca. In the Girls section, WGM Govhar Beydullayeva earned the gold medal with 8.5/11, edging out WIM Assel Serikbay (Silver medal, WGM norm) on the head-to-head tiebreak. There was a 4-way tie for third place, with WIM Meruert Kamalidenova earning the Bronze medal on tiebreaks.

2023 – Mexico City, Mexico (September 21-October 1) In the Open section, there was a 4-way tie for first place with 8.5/11, between: Marc'Andria Maurizzi (Gold medal), Arseniy Nesterov (Silver medal), Luka Budisavljevic (Bronze medal), and Mamikon Gharibyan, with the medals determined by the second tiebreak criteria. In the Girls section, there was a 3-way tie for first place with 8.5/11, between WGM Candela Francisco (Gold medal), IM Carissa Yip (Silver medal), and WGM Beloslava Krasteva (Bronze medal), with the medals determined by head-to-head tiebreak.

2024 – Gandhinagar, India (June 2–13) In the Open section, IM Kazybek Nogerbek earned the gold medal and the GM title by scoring 8.5/11, edging out Emin Ohanyan on the second tiebreak criteria. There was a 3-way tie for third place, with Luka Budisavljevic earning the Bronze medal on the third tiebreak criteria. In the Girls section, top seed IM Divya Deshmukh earned clear first place with 10.0/11, while WIM Mariam Mkrtchyan earned the silver medal with 9.5/11, and WIM Ayan Allahverdiyeva earned the bronze medal with 8.5/11.

2025 – Petrovac, Montenegro (February 24-March 8) In the Open section, GM Pranav V earned won clear first place and gold medal by scoring 9.0/11. Two players tied for second place with 8.5/11 - Matic Lavrenčič (Silver) and Elham Amar (bronze), with medals awarded based on the second tiebreak criteria. In the Girls section, WIM Anna Shukhman earned clear first place and gold medal with 9.0/11. Two players tied for second place with 8.0/11 - Ayan Allahverdiyeva (silver) and Lu Miaoyi (bronze), with medals awarded based on the second tiebreak criteria.

== See also ==
- World Youth Chess Championship
- European Junior Chess Championship
- European Youth Chess Championship
