= John H. Collins =

John H. Collins may refer to:

- John H. Collins (director) (1889–1918), American director and screenwriter
- John H. Collins (academic) (1902–1981), American classical scholar

== See also ==
- John Collins (disambiguation)
