= Mark Diesen =

American chess player (1957–2008)

Personal information
- Born: September 16, 1957 Buffalo, New York
- Died: December 9, 2008 (aged 51) Conroe, Texas

Chess career
- Country: United States
- Title: International Master (1977)
- Peak rating: 2460 (January 1979)

Mark Carl Diesen (September 16, 1957 in Buffalo, New York – December 9, 2008 in Conroe, Texas) was an American chess player. He earned the International Master title in 1976 by winning the World Junior Championship at Groningen, ahead of such noted players as Ľubomír Ftáčnik and Oleg Romanishin. It was the first time an American had won the World Junior since William Lombardy in 1957. Other achievements included being Louisiana State Champion in 1986, 1987 and 1988.

His father, Carl Diesen, was a tournament chess player as early as the mid-1940s, which resulted in strong family support for Mark's chess career. He grew up in Potomac, Maryland, a suburb of Washington, D.C., which afforded him numerous opportunities to play. It also allowed Mark to become a student of Grandmaster Lubosh Kavalek, who was one of the strongest players in the world. While Kavalek was noted as a tactician, Diesen was a player with a positional style that made him a difficult opponent for even the most experienced IMs and GMs. Among the top players he defeated in his short career were Larry Evans, Borislav Ivkov, John Nunn, and Eugenio Torre. Diesen played in the 1980 U.S. Championship—his only appearance in the Closed Championship—but had to withdraw after three rounds after injuring himself in a fall.

A graduate of the University of Tennessee, Diesen had a degree in chemical engineering. After dropping out of chess, he worked as a reservoir engineer for Shell Oil, Pennzoil and Noble Energy. He continued to influence and inspire through IM with Mark Diesen and coaching in the Conroe-Houston area.

Diesen was married with three daughters (Gina, Amy, and Sarah).
