= John Collings =

John Collings may refer to:

- John Collings (theologian)
- John Collings (MP) for Derby

== See also ==
- John Collins (disambiguation)
- John Collings-Wells, VC recipient
