= Pablo Zarnicki =

Argentine chess grandmaster (born 1972)

Personal information
- Born: November 12, 1972 (age 53) Buenos Aires, Argentina

Chess career
- Country: Argentina
- Title: Grandmaster (1994)
- FIDE rating: 2508 (July 2026)
- Peak rating: 2570 (July 1995)

Pablo Zarnicki (born 12 November 1972) is an Argentine chess player.

He won at Mar del Plata 1989. In 1992, Zarnicki won the World Junior Chess Championship at Buenos Aires.

He represented Argentina in five Chess Olympiads.

- In 1992, at second reserve board in 30th Chess Olympiad in Manila (+3 –1 =5);
- In 1994, at fourth board in 31st Chess Olympiad in Moscow (+8 –0 =5);
- In 1996, at third board in 32nd Chess Olympiad in Yerevan (+5 –1 =6);
- In 2002, at third board in 35th Chess Olympiad in Bled (+3 –1 =7);
- In 2006, at first reserve board in 37th Chess Olympiad in Turin (+5 –2 =2).

He won individual silver medal on board four at Moscow 1994.

Zarnicki was awarded with the Konex Award as one of the 5 best chess players of the decade in his country. He was awarded the Grandmaster title in 1994.
