= Raymond Weinstein =

American chess player (born 1941)

Personal information
- Born: April 25, 1941 (age 85) Brooklyn, New York

Chess career
- Country: United States
- Title: International Master (1961)

Raymond A. Weinstein (born April 25, 1941) is an American chess master from Brooklyn, New York, who was awarded the FIDE International Master title in 1962. He has been detained in a psychiatric hospital since killing a man in 1964.

== Chess career ==
Weinstein attended Erasmus Hall High School, where he was two grades ahead of Bobby Fischer. He won the 1958 U.S. Junior Chess Championship in Homestead, Florida. Weinstein played first board on the Brooklyn College chess team which became national collegiate champions. He played a total of five times in the U.S. Chess Championship. Weinstein played for the American team, led by William Lombardy, that won the 1960 World Student Team Championship in Leningrad, USSR, the first time the U.S. team had ever won that title. Weinstein tied for the gold medal on his board in that event. Weinstein played on the U.S. team in the 1960 world Chess Olympiad in Leipzig, East Germany.

Weinstein defeated many top American players, including Samuel Reshevsky and Pal Benko. He never defeated Fischer, although he drew one game of four with him (in the 1959–60 US Championship).

Weinstein's best tournament result came in the 1960–61 U.S. Championship, where he finished third, after Fischer and Lombardy. As this was a zonal year, this result qualified Weinstein to play in the Interzonal tournament, held in Stockholm in 1962, though neither he nor Lombardy played, with their places being taken by Benko and Arthur Bisguier. This result also gave Weinstein the automatic International Master title. Weinstein defeated Lombardy, Reshevsky, Bisguier and Robert Byrne in this tournament.

== Illness ==
In 1963, he graduated from Brooklyn College with a degree in psychology and travelled to Amsterdam, Netherlands, to attend graduate school. By this time, however, he had apparently developed a severe mental illness. He was reportedly arrested for assault; Dutch chess author Tim Krabbe has identified the victim as the Dutch psychology professor and International Master Johan Barendregt.

Soon after this incident, he was deported to the United States. There, he was detained in a half-way house, where he killed his 83-year-old roommate with a razor after an argument. Weinstein was deemed incapable to stand trial, and remanded to a psychiatric hospital. He is currently detained at the Kirby Forensic Psychiatric Center on Manhattan's Wards Island. Blogger Sam Sloan visited him in 1996, and reported that he was thoroughly institutionalized and very uncommunicative.
