= Evgeny Shtembuliak =

Ukrainian chess grandmaster (born 1999)

Personal information
- Born: 12 March 1999 (age 27) Chornomorsk, Odesa Oblast, Ukraine

Chess career
- Country: Ukraine
- Title: Grandmaster (2019)
- FIDE rating: 2620 (July 2026)
- Peak rating: 2628 (February 2020)

Evgeny Olehovych Shtembuliak (Ukrainian: Євген Олегович Штембуляк, romanized: Yevhen Olehovych Shtembulyak, born 12 March 1999) is a Ukrainian chess player. He was awarded the title of Grandmaster by FIDE in 2019.

Shtembuliak was born in Chornomorsk, Odesa Oblast, near Odesa, but sometimes has listed the latter as his birthplace. He played on the Ukrainian team in the Under 16 Chess Olympiad in 2014. Shtembuliak won the World Junior Chess Championship and the Ukraine Championship in 2019.

In February 2022 Shtembuliak escaped the Russian invasion of Ukraine to return to the United States where he teaches chess. He raises funds to support his country during the war crisis by conducting chess camps for kids.
