= William Lombardy =

American chess grandmaster (1937–2017)

Father William Lombardy GM
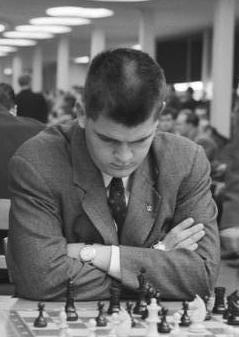
- William Lombardy (Leipzig, 1960)

Personal information
- Born: William James Joseph Lombardy; December 4, 1937 New York City, U.S.
- Died: October 13, 2017 (aged 79) Martinez, California, U.S.

Chess career
- Country: United States
- Title: Grandmaster (1960)
- Peak rating: 2540 (January 1978)
- Peak ranking: No. 46 (January 1978)

William James Joseph Lombardy (December 4, 1937 – October 13, 2017) was an American chess grandmaster, chess writer, teacher, and former Catholic priest. He was one of the leading American chess players during the 1950s and 1960s, and a contemporary of Bobby Fischer, whom he seconded during the World Chess Championship 1972. He won the World Junior Chess Championship in 1957, the only person to win that tournament with a perfect score. Lombardy led the U.S. Student Team to Gold in the 1960 World Student Team Championship in Leningrad.

== Formative years ==
Lombardy was born to an Italian-American father and Polish-American mother. Lombardy grew up at 838 Beck Street, Longwood, Bronx, New York City, in an apartment with his parents and two other families. "Bill recalls that his family had financial problems when he was young. His parents both worked and they all shared an apartment with his grandmother, an aunt and a cousin, until his second year in grammar school, when they moved to their own apartment." Shortly after World War II, Lombardy and his family moved to 961 Faile Street. Lombardy recalled of his new apartment:

I remember the winters were very tough in that apartment. My room used to sweat from the cold. The moisture used to seep through one wall. I used to have to get extra blankets to cover me at night so I wouldn't wake up with pneumonia in the morning.

It was at his new home that Lombardy became friends with an Orthodox Jewish boy named Eddie Garlerter who taught Lombardy how to play chess. When Lombardy was about 10 he went to Lion's Square Den Park to play stronger chess players. It was there that a kind, old, Jewish man gave Lombardy a booklet "that would change [his] life." Lombardy elaborated on this:

He took out a marble design notebook from a brown paper bag. "Here," he said, "I'm finished with it." I thanked him for the book, put it in the bag and played chess with the man. When I got home, I looked at my book. Back in those days, there were five or six newspapers that carried a chess column. Over many, many years the old man had studiously pasted some two thousand of those chess clippings into his book. I had never asked him whether he had actually played over the games in those clippings. I was about to do what he himself may not entirely have done.

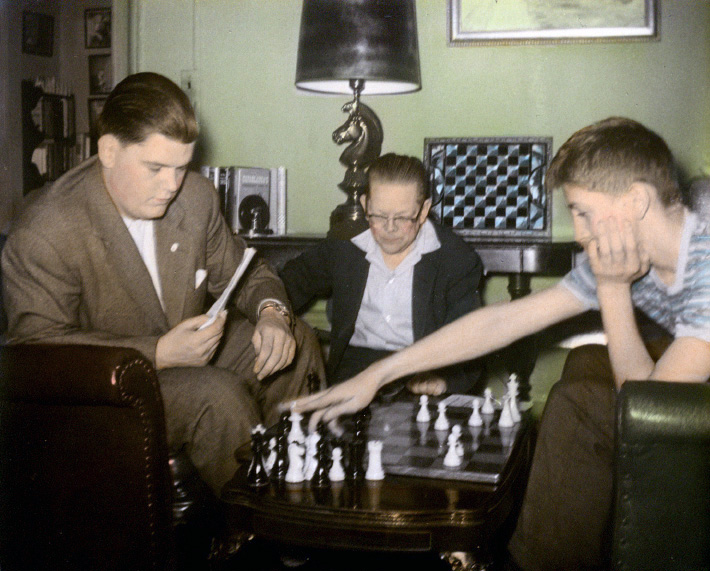
Bill Lombardy and Bobby Fischer analyzing, with Jack Collins watching them

Lombardy did not become a member of the Marshall Chess Club until several years later (at the age of 14), when he started to get serious about his chess playing.

After attending the City College of New York for three years, Lombardy received his B.A. in philosophy, an M.A. in ethics, and an M.Div., all from Saint Joseph's Seminary (Dunwoodie). He also studied educational psychology at Saint Louis University.

== Early career ==
According to Jack Collins, "Bill's chess ability developed rapidly." Lombardy won the 1954 New York State Championship with a score of 9/11 (+7−0=4), and tied for first with Larry Evans at the 1956 Canadian Open Chess Championship. He then played and lost a match versus grandmaster Samuel Reshevsky by the score of 3½–2½, and, in the same year, played second board for the World Student Team Championship in Uppsala, Sweden, going undefeated, and scoring 7/9.

In 1957, Lombardy became the first American to win the World Junior Chess Championship. He won the tournament in Toronto with a perfect score of 11–0. He was the first U.S. citizen since Steinitz to win an individual world chess title. Based on his performance, he was automatically awarded the International Master title.

In 1958, he played in the Mar del Plata tournament and went "undefeated in second place", scoring 11/15. In 1959, he took first place in the U.S. Log Cabin Invitational, scoring 7/10. In 1960, he was awarded the title of International Grandmaster.

== Semi-retirement and priesthood ==
Lombardy finished second in the 1960–61 U.S. Championship behind Bobby Fischer and ahead of Raymond Weinstein in a star-studded field. With this result, Lombardy qualified to compete in the Interzonal tournament to be held in Stockholm for the right to advance to a match for the world championship. However, Lombardy decided to retire from tournament competition and enter formation to become a Catholic priest. Before retiring, he lost a match to Larry Evans by the score of 5½–4½. At the 1961 Zurich Chess Tournament, Lombardy tied for fourth place with Svetozar Gligorić, scoring 6½/11.

In 1962, Lombardy tied for second at the U.S. Open, then won the New England Championship, and, shortly thereafter, gave a lecture at the Manhattan Chess Club in which he analyzed the game: Lombardy–Lyman, New England Championship, Haverhill, September 1962 Ruy Lopez [C93](1–0).

In 1963, Lombardy won the U.S. Open Chess Championship, along with Robert Byrne, scoring 11/13. Lombardy also became U.S. Speed champion. In 1965, Lombardy tied with Byrne for first at the Western Open in St. Louis, and shared first place with Pal Benko at the USA Open Championship in Puerto Rico. In 1966, Lombardy took clear first at the Southern Open in Atlanta, and tied with Borislav Ivkov for second at the Canadian Open.

Lombardy was ordained as a Catholic priest in June 1967.

In 1969, Lombardy tied for second with Vlastimil Hort, going undefeated at Monte Carlo, scoring 7/11. In the same year, Lombardy tied for second with Benko and Mato Damjanović at Netanya, Israel.

== Team competitions ==
Lombardy played first board for the U.S. Team that won the 1960 World Student Team Championship in Leningrad, USSR. Lombardy defeated future world champion Boris Spassky in their individual game. Lombardy won a gold medal for best result on first board in that event with a score of 12–1, and led the team to a Student Team winning percentage of 78.8, the highest winning percentage in the history of the World Student Team Championships.

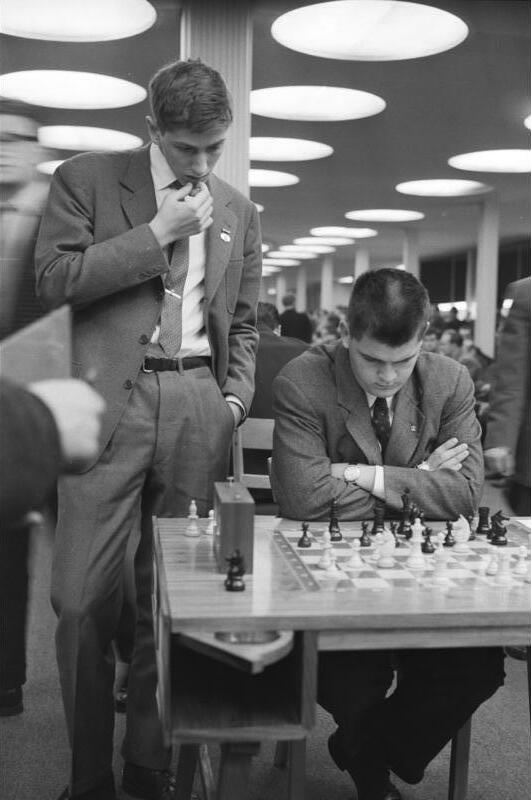
Lombardy (seated) and Fischer at the 14th Chess Olympiad in Leipzig

His seven times representing the US at the World Student Team Championship is an American record.

In 1976, Lombardy was on the U.S. team that won a gold medal at the 22nd Chess Olympiad in Haifa.

In total, Lombardy won three individual gold medals, between the Men's Chess Olympiads and the World Student Team Tournament (Under 26-Years-Old):

Men's Olympiad	Board No.	Individual result	percentage	U.S. team result	percentage
Munich 1958	2	11/17 (Seventh)	64.7%	Fourth,	61.8%
Leipzig 1960	2	11½/17 (Fifth)	67.6%	Silver,	72.5%
Lugano 1968	reserve	7½/11 (Silver)	68.2%	Fourth	61.8%
Siegen 1970	reserve	11/14 (Gold)	78.6%	Fourth,	67.8%
Nice 1974	reserve	11/16 (Silver)	68.8%	Bronze,	68.2%
Haifa 1976	reserve	7/9 (Silver)	77.8%	Gold	71.2%
Buenos Aires 1978	2nd res.	4/7 (Sixteenth)	57.1%	Bronze	62.5%

Student Team U26	Board No.	Individual result	percentage	U.S. team result	percentage
Uppsala 1956	2	7/9 (Gold)	77.8%	Eighth	43.8%
Reykjavik 1957	1	7/12	58.3%	Silver	59.6%
Varna 1958	1	5½/10	55%	Silver	55%
Leningrad 1960	1	12/13 (Gold)	92.3%	Gold	78.8%
Helsinki 1961	1	9/11 (Silver)	81.8%	Silver	71.9%
Budva 1963	1	7½/11 (Fifth)	68.2%	Fifth	60.4%
Kraków 1964	1	7½/13 (Eighth)	57.7%	Fourth	61.6%

== Later career ==
In 1971, Lombardy gave a simultaneous exhibition and lecture at the U.S. Military Academy at West Point. In 1974, Lombardy tied for second in The USA Open Championship, with 9½/12, going undefeated. Lombardy tied for first with Pal Benko in The USA Open Championship in Lincoln, Nebraska, in 1975. Lombardy tied for fifth–sixth place with 6/9 in The Lone Pine Open in 1977.

In 1978 and 1979, Lombardy served as the lead instructor at an "all day", week-long chess camp at Michigan State University. This was perhaps the first camp of its type in the United States and attracted juniors from all over the country. In 1979 Lombardy equaled his earlier score at Lone Pine, tying for fifth–tenth, and winning an upset against tournament favorite (and then World Number 2 player) Victor Korchnoi.

In 1980, Lombardy renounced the Catholic priesthood. In 1982, Lombardy took "equal first in Caracas", Venezuela. In 1984, Lombardy took second place in Neskaupstaður, Iceland, scoring 7/11.

By 2010, Lombardy was retired from chess and lived in the East Village of New York City, where he focused on his writing and offered chess lessons by appointment. In November 2011 Lombardy self-published his autobiographical game collection: Understanding Chess: My System, My Games, My Life.

== Contributions to chess ==
=== Opening theory ===
Position: a8 black rook, c8 black bishop, d8 black queen, f8 black rook, g8 black king, e7 black bishop, f7 black pawn, g7 black pawn, h7 black pawn, a6 black pawn, c6 black pawn, d6 black pawn, f6 black knight, a5 black knight, b5 black pawn, e5 black pawn, e4 white pawn, c3 white pawn, f3 white knight, h3 white pawn, a2 white pawn, b2 white pawn, c2 white bishop, d2 white pawn, f2 white pawn, g2 white pawn, a1 white rook, b1 white knight, c1 white bishop, d1 white queen, e1 white rook, g1 white king

Lombardy's Ruy Lopez novelty 10...c6

In the first round of the 1957 World Junior Championship, Lombardy defeated the Soviet representative Vladimir Selimanov in a variation of the Ruy Lopez that Lombardy invented: 1.e4 e5 2.Nf3 Nc6 3.Bb5 a6 4.Ba4 Nf6 5.0-0 Be7 6.Re1 b5 7.Bb3 d6 8.c3 0-0 9.h3 Na5 10.Bc2 c6. Lombardy essayed the move in at least nine official tournament games, scoring three wins, two losses, and four draws:

- Selimanov–Lombardy, Toronto 1957 (0–1)
- Olafsson–Lombardy, Reykjavik 1957 (½–½)
- Gligoric–Lombardy, Munich 1958 (1–0)
- Unzicker–Lombardy, Munich 1958 (½–½)
- Ader–Lombardy, Bogota 1958 (0–1)
- Ostojic–Lombardy, Wijk aan Zee 1969 (0–1)
- Peters–Lombardy, Oberlin 1975 (1–0)
- Parma–Lombardy, Banja Luka 1976 (½–½)
- Hjartarson–Lombardy, Neskaupstadur 1984 (½–½)

=== 1972 Spassky–Fischer World Championship Match ===
Fischer was scheduled to play a match against Spassky for the World Chess Championship 1972. However, Fischer had a falling out with Larry Evans, who had been Fischer's second in his successful matches against Bent Larsen and Tigran Petrosian.

At the last minute, Fischer called upon Lombardy to help him with the match. Although Lombardy was still a priest, he was allowed to take time off from the priesthood to go to Reykjavík, Iceland, to serve as the official second to Fischer. Lombardy may have kept Fischer from forfeiting the match.

=== In film ===
On September 16, 2015, the American biographical film Pawn Sacrifice was released, starring Tobey Maguire as Bobby Fischer, Liev Schreiber as Boris Spassky, Lily Rabe as Joan Fischer, and Peter Sarsgaard as Lombardy.

== Personal life ==
Lombardy left the priesthood in 1980. In 1982, he met a woman at a chess tournament in the Netherlands whom he married and with whom he later had a son.

== Later life and death ==
In March 2016, The New York Times reported that Lombardy was embroiled in an eviction battle against his landlord, allegedly being several thousand dollars behind in rent. In 2016 he was evicted and left homeless, living on the subways and in various chess clubs.

The Archdiocese of New York was made aware of his plight and agreed to house him and provide long-term care even though he had left the priesthood. Lombardy accepted the offer but soon thereafter he left New York to live with a friend, Ralph Palmieri, in Martinez, California.

Lombardy died of a suspected heart attack at Palmieri's home on October 13, 2017.

== Writings ==
- Lombardy, William (1972). Modern Chess Opening Traps (1st ed.). David McKay. ISBN 4871879763.
- Lombardy, William (1973). Snatched Opportunities on the Chessboard: Quick Victories in 200 Recent Master Games. Batsford. ISBN 0713403659.
- Daniels, David; Koltanowski, George; Lombardy, William (1975). US Championship Chess, with the Games of the 1973 Tournament. David McKay. ISBN 4871879771.
- Daniels, David; Lombardy, William (1975). Chess Panorama. Chilton. ISBN 4871879720.
- Lombardy, William (1977). Chess for Children, Step by Step: A New, Easy Way to Learn the Game. Little Brown & Co. ISBN 4871879739.
- Lombardy, William (1978). Modern Chess Opening Traps (2nd ed.). David McKay. ISBN 4871879763.
- Lombardy, William (1978). Guide to Tournament Chess. David McKay. ISBN 0679130497.
- Lombardy, William; Verhoeven, R. G. P. (1983). 6e Interpolis schaaktoernooi 1982 (6th Interpolis Chess Tournament). Interpolis.
- Lombardy, William (2011). Understanding Chess: My System, My Games, My Life. Russell Enterprises. ISBN 978-1-93649-022-6.
