= John Collins (painter) =

British painter

- Occupation: Painter

John Collins (1725?–1759?) was a British landscape painter.

== Biography ==
Collins was from an early age patronised by the aristocracy. At the expense of the Duke of Ancaster, the Marquis of Exeter, and others, he travelled in Italy and studied his art there. On his return to England, he painted scenes for one of the principal theatres in London. He died of an infectious fever at a silversmith's in Henrietta Street, Covent Garden, about 1758 or 1759. He was aged between thirty and forty, and left a wife and two children. The best known of his works are a set of landscape views from Tasso's 'Gerusalemme Liberata.' They are painted in a truly romantic style, and have a fine scenic effect. They were engraved by Paul Sandby, Edward Rooker, P. C. Canot, and others, and published by his widow.
