= Jack Collins (1930s footballer) =

English footballer

Personal information
- Full name: James Collins
- Place of birth: London, England
- Position: Winger

Senior career*
Years	Team	Apps	(Gls)
1931–1932	Liverpool	0	(0)
1932–1933	Cardiff City	6	(0)
1933–1934	Millwall	0	(0)
1934–?	Bangor		
- * Club domestic league appearances and goals

James Collins was an English professional footballer who played as a winger. He played in the Football League for Cardiff City.
