= John Collins (Bengal Army officer) =

- Died: 1807; Lucknow, India
- Occupation: Soldier
- Years active: 1769–1804

John Collins (died 11 June 1807) was a British colonel in the Bengal Native Infantry who served with the British East India Company.

== Biography ==
Collins joined the Bengal infantry as a cadet in 1769, and became an ensign in that branch of the East India Company's service in 1770, lieutenant on 17 November 1772, captain on 20 November 1780, and major in 1794.

Collins served in the Rohilla war and other campaigns in India, and he probably acted in a subordinate capacity in Indian courts.

Collins was appointed by Sir John Shore in 1795 to be resident at the court of Daulat Rao Sindhia a young prince who had in the previous year succeeded his great-uncle, Mahadaji Sindhia. The prince was eager to make some use of the magnificent army, disciplined by the French generals, De Boigne and Perron, which had been bequeathed to him. Major, or Lieutenant-colonel Collins, as he became on 27 July 1796, soon acquired great influence over this ambitious prince, but not enough to prevent him from desiring to try his strength with that of the company.

According to the Dictionary of National Biography, the fearless character of Collins was well shown in his daring march with a small body of his personal escort under Captain (afterwards Sir Thomas) Brown, in October 1799, to Jaipur, in the heart of the then almost unknown region of Rajputana, to make a successful demand from the Maharaja of Jaipur for the surrender of Vizier Ali, the treacherous murderer of Mr. Cherry. Lord Wellesley, when governor-general of India, had the greatest confidence in Collins, who played a most important part in the proceedings which led to the overthrow of the great Maratha princes by Lake and Arthur Wellesley.

Collins did all in his power to prevent Sindhia from coming to blows with the English, but the young prince continued his preparations for war, and with his ally, the Bhonsla Raja of Nagpur, persisted in his march on Poona, which was then occupied by an English army under Sir Arthur Wellesley. In June 1803 Collins was told to deliver the ultimatum of the company, that if Sindhia and the Rájá of Nagpur did not return to their territories, the English would attack them. Collins could get no definite answer to this ultimatum.

On 3 August 1803 he left Sindhia's court, and the war commenced; which, after the victories of Assaye and Argaum, Laswaree and Díg, finally overthrew the power of the Máráthá princes. In Kaye's ‘Life of Lord Metcalfe,’ it is said that young Metcalfe was, through his father's influence, appointed an assistant to Collins at Sindhia's court, and joined him in April 1802 at Oojein. But he found the imperious character of Collins, which justified his nickname ‘King Collins,’ quite insupportable, and quickly left him.

Collins was not sent back to Sindhia after the war, but succeeded Colonel Scott as resident at the court of the Nawáb Vizier of Oudh at Lucknow in 1804, where he died on 11 June 1807. Lord Minto issued a gazette extraordinary on the news of his death, and he received a grand public funeral, at which one of the sons of the Nawáb was present; the whole Oudh court went into mourning for him.

He buried at cemetery in Lucknow, that place got named after him kallan ki lat (colonel's lat).
