= John Collins (Surveyor General) =

- Died: 1795; Quebec
- Occupation: Surveyor
- Known for: negotiated the Toronto Purchase

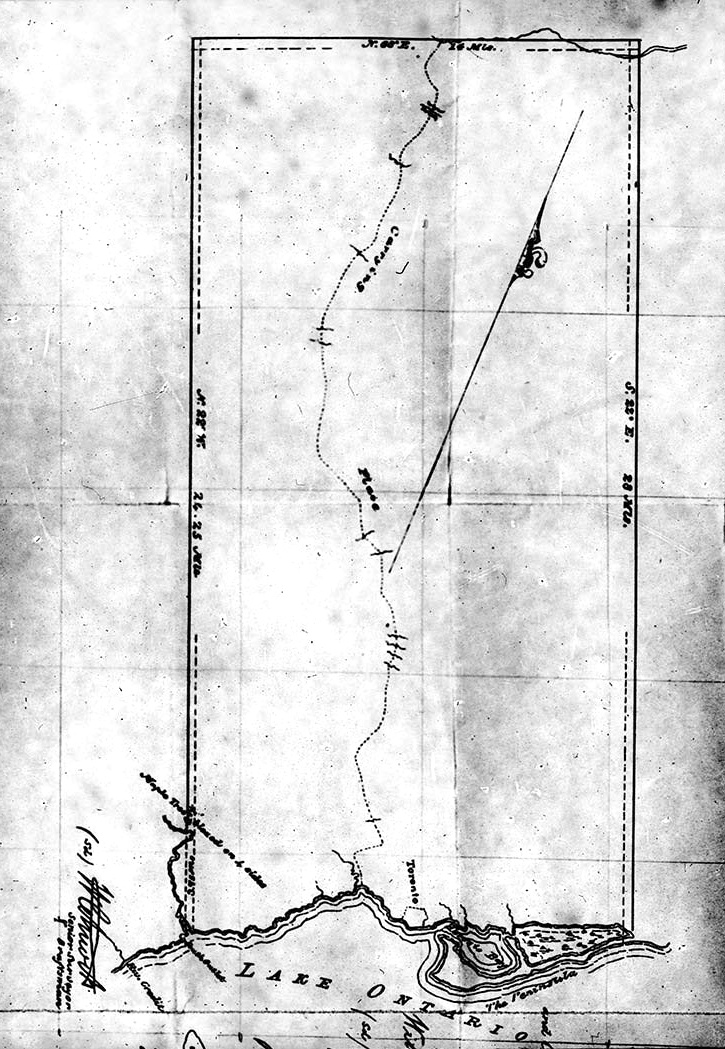
Collins negotiated the Toronto Purchase.

John Collins was an influential Deputy Surveyor General in the Province of Canada shortly after it was captured by the British.

== Personal life ==
According to the Dictionary of Canadian Biography little is known of Collins's early life. Samuel Johannes Holland, Surveyor General when Collins was appointed his deputy, on September 8, 1764, wrote that he had been “imployed for many years as a deputy Surveyor in the Southern Colonys”.

The Dictionary of Canadian Biography notes he was a prominent Freemason. His wife, Margaret, died in 1770, and he had at least one child, a daughter, Mary, who married John Rankin, also a surveyor.

== Work as a surveyor, in Canada ==
Collins was appointed Deputy Surveyor General on September 8, 1764.

His first major assignment, in 1765 was to survey the border between Canada and the Province of New York.

On September 23, 1787, Collins represented Governor General Lord Dorchester in the negotiation of the Toronto Purchase.

== Provincial legislator and administrator ==
In the Province of Canada the Legislative Council's laws were not fully binding on the Governor, and the Governor appointed many of its members. Collins was first appointed to the Legislative Council in 1773. And was entrusted with positions on multiple administrative committees.
