= John W. Collins =

American chess coach and author (1912–2001)

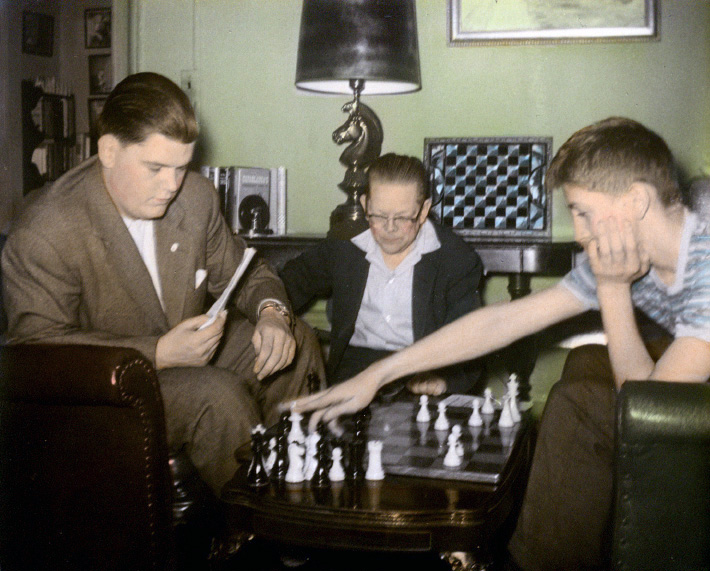
- Jack Collins (center) with William Lombardy and Bobby Fischer

Personal information
- Born: John William Collins; September 23, 1912 Newburgh, New York, U.S.
- Died: December 2, 2001 (aged 89)

Chess career
- Country: United States
- Title: US Corr. Chess Champion (1943); NY State Chess Champion (1952)

John "Jack" William Collins (September 23, 1912 – December 2, 2001) was an American chess master, author, and teacher.

== Early life ==
Collins was born in Newburgh, New York. "His father, John Thomas Collins, was a flutist and piccolo player who was frequently in John Philip Sousa's orchestra. His mother, Carolyn LaSears Collins, was a homemaker." Collins used a wheelchair due to "a birth injury".

When he was in his teens, Collins met Frederick Huhn, the family's 80-year-old German landlord of their home at 69 Hawthorne Street in Brooklyn, NY. Frederick taught Collins how to play chess. From there, Collins started reading chess books, eventually amassing "a library of over six hundred."

== The Hawthorne Chess Club ==
Collins tried to join the Marshall Chess Club, but found the players to be too strong, and the location too far away for him to travel to. Hence, he started teaching "the other boys on the block" and the Hawthorne Chess Club was founded.

Collins wrote to the local newspapers and "obtained the names and addresses of several high-school teams in the metropolitan area." This led to inter-club matches between Collins' team and the high-school teams, mostly played out of Collins' living room.

Eventually Collins founded the Brooklyn Chess League. He later moved to 91 Lenox Road where the club gradually changed from a chess league to a casual meeting place for chess celebrities to meet. Guests and visitors included Irving Chernev, Hermann Helms, and Irving Riskie.

== Chess achievements ==
Collins won the 1943 United States Correspondence Championship, defeating Dr. Erich W. Marchand in a final playoff match. Collins won the 1952 New York State Championship, ahead of Max Pavey, Anthony Santasiere, James Sherwin, and Frank Anderson. He won the Marshall Chess Club championship in 1953 and was soon thereafter ranked number 17 in the country. Collins was a renowned chess teacher.

== Teaching and mentorship ==
There has been a long-held belief that Collins was Fischer's teacher and coach, as well as a teacher and coach for William Lombardy, Robert Byrne, Donald Byrne, Raymond Weinstein, Salvatore Matera, and Lewis Cohen. Some have gone as far as to call Collins "the Yoda of American chess", while others refer to Collins as Fischer's "mentor", not his teacher or coach. Collins himself states he did not teach Bobby Fischer, Robert Byrne, William Lombardy, or Donald Byrne, yet taught Raymond Weinstein, Sal Matera, and Lewis Cohen.

Lombardy says of Collins as a chess teacher and coach:

Jack Collins was not in any way capable of teaching me, the Byrne Brothers, Raymond Weinstein, let alone Bobby Fischer. All had entered his home in friendship and were already superior masters, far past the ability of Collins to impart anything but trivial knowledge...I cannot imagine even today that anyone could consider that Collins had the strength of knowledge to coach the champion that Bobby already was by the time he reached Collins apartment! Somehow the myth of Collins' professional skills persists. Back then because Collins was in a wheelchair, I did not desire to burst his bubble... [but that] with my misplaced sympathy for Collins gone, I attempt to correct and inform.

== Books ==
- My Seven Chess Prodigies. Ishi Press International. December 4, 2019. ISBN 978-4871879620. (1975)
- Collins, John W. (January 12, 1981). Maxims of Chess. Crown Publishing. ISBN 0-679-14403-X. (1978)
- Modern Chess Openings. ASIN B000LF0NMO. Ninth Edition, Edited by Walter Korn and John W. Collins (1957)
