= Robert Byrne (chess player) =

American chess grandmaster (1928–2013)

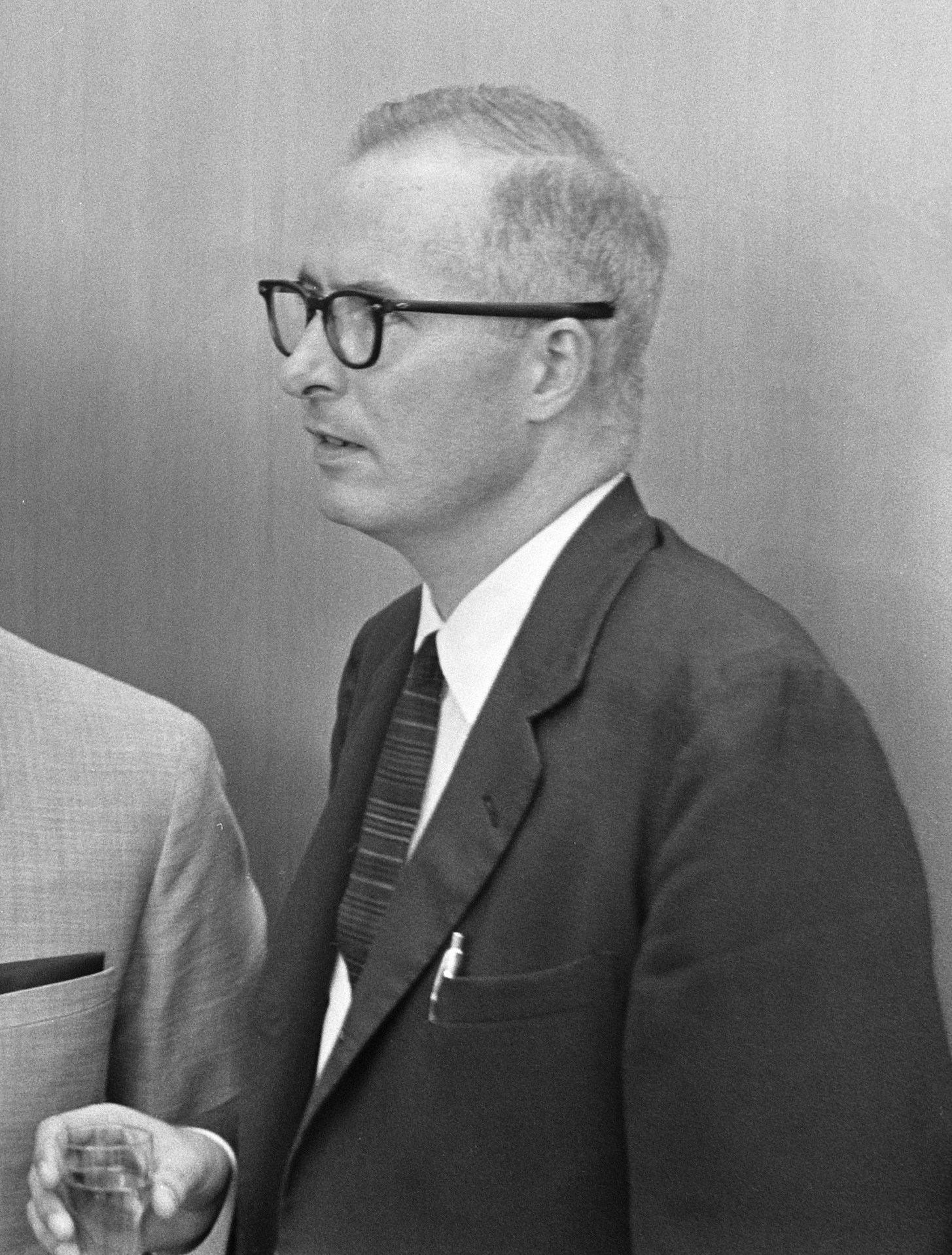
- Byrne in Amsterdam, 1969

Personal information
- Born: Robert Eugene Byrne; April 20, 1928 Brooklyn, New York, U.S.
- Died: April 12, 2013 (aged 84) Ossining, New York, U.S.

Chess career
- Country: United States
- Title: Grandmaster (1964)
- Peak rating: 2605 (July 1973)
- Peak ranking: No. 12 (July 1973)

Robert Eugene Byrne (April 20, 1928 – April 12, 2013) was an American chess player and chess author who held the FIDE title of Grandmaster. He won the U.S. Championship in 1972, and was a World Chess Championship Candidate in 1974. Byrne represented the United States nine times in Chess Olympiads from 1952 to 1976 and won seven medals. He was the chess columnist from 1972 to 2006 for The New York Times, which ran his final column (a recounting of his 1952 victory over David Bronstein) on November 12, 2006. Byrne worked as a university professor for many years, before becoming a chess professional in the early 1970s.

== Early years ==
Byrne was born in Brooklyn, the son of Elizabeth Eleanor (Cattalier) and Robert Byrne. He and his younger brother Donald grew up in New York City and were among the "Collins Kids", promising young players who benefited from the instruction and encouragement of John W. Collins. Both ultimately became college professors and among the leading chess players in the country. They were part of a talented new generation of young American masters that also included Larry Evans, Arthur Bisguier, and George Kramer.

Robert Byrne's first Master event was Ventnor City in 1945, where he scored a respectable 4/9 to place 8th; the winner was Weaver Adams. He tied 1st–2nd in the Premier Reserves section at the U.S. Open Chess Championship, Pittsburgh, in 1946. College studies limited his opportunities for the next several years; he represented the U.S. in a 1950 radio match against Yugoslavia. In the 1951 Maurice Wertheim Memorial in New York, Byrne scored 6/11, tying for 6th–7th place; this was a Grandmaster round-robin featuring six of the world's top 36 players, and was won by Samuel Reshevsky.

Byrne became an International Master based on his results at the 1952 Chess Olympiad at Helsinki (bronze medal on third board). In that same year he graduated from Yale University. He went on to become a professor of philosophy at Indiana University, and his academic career left him little time for chess. He did represent the U.S. in team matches against the Soviet Union at New York in 1954 (losing 1½–2½ to Alexander Kotov), and Moscow in 1955 (losing ½–3½ to Paul Keres).

== Grandmaster ==
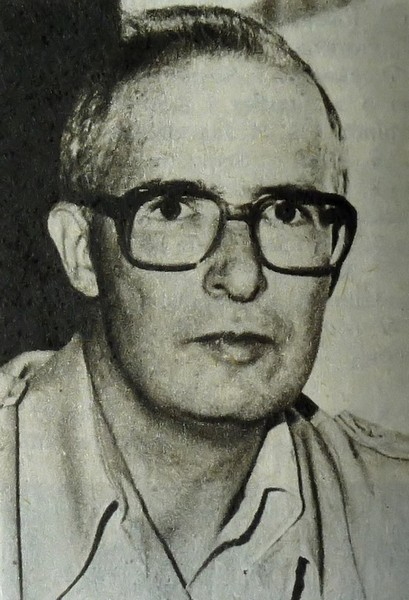
Robert Byrne

Byrne shared 4th–7th positions at the 1957 U.S. Open Chess Championship in Cleveland with 9/12, a point behind joint winners Bobby Fischer and Arthur Bisguier. Byrne did not play in his first U.S. Chess Championship until the age of 30 in 1958–59, placing tied 9th–10th with 4/11; the winner was Bobby Fischer. But Byrne improved dramatically the next year in the same event to place 2nd with 8/11, ahead of Reshevsky and Pal Benko, as Fischer won again.

In 1960, Byrne increased his serious play, winning the U.S. Open Chess Championship at St. Louis, and taking a silver medal on third board at the Olympiad in Leipzig. A poor result of 8th–11th place in the U.S. Championship 1960–61, with only 4½/11, was balanced by his fine tie for 2nd–5th places at Mar del Plata 1961 with 11½/15, behind winner Miguel Najdorf. On that same South American trip, he dominated a small but strong event at Santa Fe with 6½/7, ahead of Miroslav Filip, Aleksandar Matanović, and Héctor Rossetto. In the U.S. Championship of 1961–62, he tied for 2nd–3rd places on 7/11, half a point behind Larry Evans. He placed 6th in the U.S. Championship 1962–63 with 6/11, as Fischer won again. In the U.S. Championship 1963–64 he again placed 6th with 5½/11, as Fischer defeated Byrne brilliantly in 21 moves and won the tournament with a perfect score. Of his game against Fischer, Byrne wrote: "The culminating combination is of such depth that, even at the very moment at which I resigned, both grandmasters who were commenting on the play for the spectators in a separate room believed I had a won game!"

In 1964, Byrne's third-place finish at the Buenos Aires tournament (behind Paul Keres and World Champion Tigran Petrosian), with 11½/17, made him an International Grandmaster. Byrne shared 2nd–3rd places in the U.S. Championship 1965–66 with 7½/11; Fischer won again, but Byrne defeated Fischer in their individual game. He shared the 1966 U.S. Open title with Pal Benko at Seattle. He scored 4½/11 for a shared 8th–10th place in the U.S. Championship 1966–67, with Fischer winning. Byrne qualified for his first Interzonal tournament, Sousse 1967, but scored just 7½/22, far short of advancing.

== U.S. Champion, Candidate ==
By the late 1960s he was playing chess semi-professionally. He won the 1972 U.S. Championship; after tying with Samuel Reshevsky and Lubomir Kavalek in the tournament proper, Byrne won the 1973 playoff at Chicago. Subsequently, scoring 12½/17, Byrne achieved his career highlight of third place at the Leningrad Interzonal in 1973, which made him only the fourth American (after Reshevsky, Bobby Fischer, and Pal Benko) to qualify for the Candidates Tournament (part of the world chess championship process). However, he lost his first-round Candidates match to former world champion Boris Spassky by 1½–4½ at San Juan, Puerto Rico, in 1974.

As a 1974 Candidate, Byrne was seeded directly to the 1976 Biel Interzonal, where he performed very strongly but missed a playoff berth by half a point, sharing 5th–6th places with 11½/19, behind Bent Larsen (winner, with 12½), Mikhail Tal, Lajos Portisch, and Petrosian (2th–4th, with 12).

Byrne was the highest-rated American player on the January 1977 FIDE rating list.

== At the Olympiads ==
Byrne played nine times for the United States, with a total of +51−12=53, for 66.8 per cent, and won seven individual and team medals. His detailed results follow.

- Helsinki 1952, board 3, 10½/15 (+8−2=5), board bronze;
- Leipzig 1960, board 3, 12/15 (+9−0=6), board silver, team silver;
- Varna 1962, board 4, 8½/13 (+7−3=3);
- Havana 1966, board 2, 6½/13 (+3−3=7), team silver;
- Lugano 1968, board 4, 7½/12 (+4−1=7);
- Skopje 1972, board 2, 9½/14 (+6−1=7);
- Nice 1974, board 2, 12/16 (+8−0=8), team bronze;
- Haifa 1976, board 1, 7/10 (+5−1=4), team gold;
- Buenos Aires 1978, board 4, 4/8 (+1−1=6), team bronze.

== Later career and legacy ==
When he became the columnist for the Times in 1972, he became less active as a player. He did, nevertheless, win tournaments at Torremolinos (1976–77), Harare (1983), and Lagos (1993). He has also been a frequent contributor to Chess Life magazine, the publication of the United States Chess Federation. He has chaired USCF's committee on masters' affairs and been one of its vice presidents. Byrne was inducted into the U.S. Chess Hall of Fame in 1994.

Throughout his career, Byrne improved his results level by level in major competitions, at the U.S. Open, the U.S. Championship, the Olympiad, and the Interzonal. He made original contributions in several opening systems. He was the first to play 6.Be3 against the Najdorf Variation of the Sicilian Defense (1.e4 c5 2.Nf3 d6 3.d4 cxd4 4.Nxd4 Nf6 5.Nc3 a6 6.Be3); this system has been named for him and has been very popular since the mid-1980s. He developed the Byrne Variation of the King's Indian Defense against the Saemisch Variation, with a quick queenside expansion by Black. He used the Dutch Defense with success when that opening was rarely seen at the top level. His opening repertoire was wide with both colors, and featured both Open and Closed games, which made him a challenge to prepare for. Byrne played competitively until age 74 in 2002, with an average of a couple of significant events per year even past age 60. He retired from writing his chess column at age 78.

=== Books ===
- Beginning Chess (1972)
- Both Sides of the Chessboard (1974) (with Iivo Nei)
- New York Times Book of Great Chess Victories & Defeats (1990) (collection of Times columns) ISBN 0-8129-1884-3

== Death ==
Byrne died in 2013 at his home in Ossining, New York, from Parkinson's disease.

== Notable games ==
- David Bronstein vs Robert Byrne, Helsinki Olympiad 1952, Queen's Gambit Accepted (D24), 0–1 Very impressive win over the 1951 World finalist.
- Robert Byrne vs Miroslav Filip, Mar del Plata 1961, King's Indian Defense, Fianchetto Variation (E60), 1–0 Byrne defeats a player who became a Candidate the next year.
- Miguel Najdorf vs Robert Byrne, Buenos Aires 1964, King's Indian Defense, Classical / Petrosian Variation (E93), 0–1 A key victory from the tournament where Byrne earned his GM title.
- Bobby Fischer vs Robert Byrne, U.S. Championship, New York 1965–66, French Defense, Tarrasch / Guimard Variation (C03), 0–1 Byrne finds a very clever tactical possibility to bring down the phenomenal Fischer.
- Robert Byrne vs Leonid Stein, Sarajevo 1967, Sicilian Defense, Accelerated Dragon Variation (B35), 1–0 Byrne defeats the Soviet champion Stein in one of his favourite variations.
- Vladimir Savon vs Robert Byrne, Moscow 1971, King's Indian Attack (A07), 0–1 Another Soviet champion has to tilt his King right in Moscow.
- Samuel Reshevsky vs Robert Byrne, U.S. Championship Playoff, Chicago 1973, King's Indian Defense, Classical Variation (E92), 0–1 A critical win that helped propel Byrne to the Interzonal later that year. Reshevsky had a clear win before he blundered to allow a winning queen sacrifice.
- Bent Larsen vs Robert Byrne, Leningrad Interzonal 1973, King's Indian Defense, Saemisch Variation (E80), 0–1 Byrne upsets one of the tournament favourites by undermining Larsen's overextended centre.
- Robert Byrne vs Mark Taimanov, Leningrad Interzonal 1973, Sicilian Defense, Taimanov Variation (B46), 1–0 Byrne overcomes Taimanov's patented defense.
- Jan Timman vs Robert Byrne, Nice Olympiad 1974, Queen's Gambit Declined (D53), 0–1 One of the strongest young Grandmasters learns to respect the veteran Byrne.
- Robert Byrne vs Viktor Korchnoi, Moscow 1975, Pirc Defense, Austrian Attack (B09), 1–0 Korchnoi's form during this period took him to two world championship challenges in the years ahead.
- Robert Byrne vs Vasily Smyslov, Biel Interzonal 1976, French Defense, Winawer / Positional Variation (C19), 1–0 Byrne succeeds with a line which Smyslov himself had made famous in the 1940s.
- Robert Byrne vs Joel Benjamin, U.S. Championship, Berkeley 1984, Sicilian Defense, Classical Richter–Rauzer Variation (B60), 1–0 Benjamin neglects his development and King safety, and pays the ultimate price.

Achievements
| Preceded by Samuel Reshevsky | United States Chess Champion; 1972 | Succeeded by John Grefe, Lubomir Kavalek |
