= The History of Rome (Mommsen) =

Three-volume literary work published (1854–1856)

A notebook used by Theodore Mommsen for his Römische Geschichte or The History of Rome

The History of Rome (German: Römische Geschichte) is a multi-volume history of ancient Rome written by the German classical scholar and historian Theodor Mommsen (1817–1903). Originally published by Reimer & Hirzel, Leipzig, as three volumes during 1854–1856, the work dealt with the Roman Republic. A subsequent book was issued which concerned the provinces of the Roman Empire. In 1992, a further book on the Empire, reconstructed from lecture notes, was published. The initial three volumes won widespread acclaim upon publication; indeed, "The Roman History made Mommsen famous in a day." Still read and qualifiedly cited, it is the prolific Mommsen's most well-known work. The work was specifically cited when Mommsen was awarded the Nobel Prize.

== Genesis ==
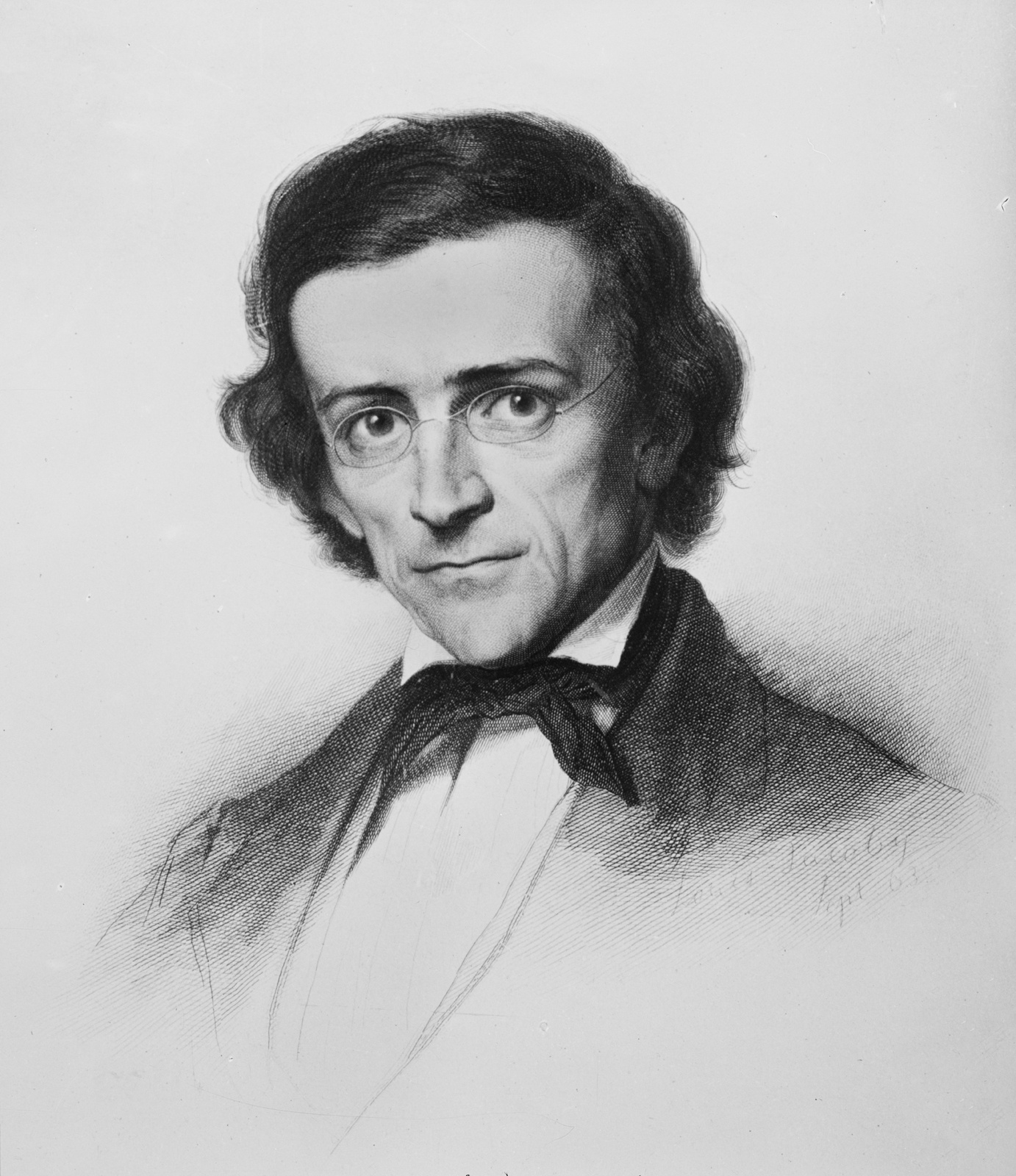
Theodor Mommsen in 1863

Writing the History followed Mommsen's earlier achievements in the study of ancient Rome. He had not himself designed to write a history, but the opportunity presented itself in 1850 while at the University of Leipzig where Mommsen was a thirty-two-year-old special Professor of Law. "Invited to give a public lecture while at Leipzig, I delivered an address on the Gracchi. Reimer and Hirzel, the publishers, were present, and two days later they asked me to write a Roman History for their series." Having been dismissed from the University for revolutionary activities, Mommsen would accept the publishing proposal "partly for my livelihood, and partly because the work greatly appeals to me."

The publishers specified that the work focus on events and circumstances, and avoid discussing the scholarly process. While they certainly wanted a well-respected academic work to fit their acclaimed series on history, Karl Reimer and Solomon Hirzel were also seeking one with literary merit that would be accessible and appeal to the educated public. As a scholar Mommsen was an active party in recent advances made in ancient Roman studies. Yet Mommsen also had some experience as a journalist. He might well manage to become a popular academic author. "It is high time for such a work", Mommsen wrote to an associate in Roman studies, "it is more than ever necessary to present to a wider audience the results of our researches."

== Publication ==
=== Original ===
Originally the History was conceived as a five volume work, spanning Roman history from its inception to the emperor Diocletian (284–305). The first three volumes, which covered the origin of Rome through the fall of the Republic, ending with the reforms of Julius Caesar, were published in 1854, 1855, and 1856, as the Römische Geschichte.

These three volumes did indeed become very popular. "Their success was immediate." Here "a professional scholar" presented his readers with a prose that was of "such vigor and life, such grasp of detail combined with such vision, such self-confident mastery of a vast field of learning." Especially in Mommsen's third volume, as the narrative told of how the political crisis in the Roman Republic came to its final climax, "he wrote with a fire of imagination and emotion almost unknown in a professional history. Here was scientific learning with the stylistic vigor of a novel."

These first three volumes of the Römische Geschichte retained their popularity in Germany, with eight editions being published in Mommsen's lifetime. Following his death in 1903, an additional eight German editions have issued.

=== Later volumes ===
Provinces of the Roman Empire, 117 A.D.

A planned fourth volume covering Roman history under the Empire was delayed pending Mommsen's completion of a then 15-volume work on Roman inscriptions. This task required his services as researcher, writer, and editor, which occupied Mommsen for many years. After repeated delays the projected fourth volume was eventually abandoned, or at least not published; an early manuscript may have been lost in a fire.

Despite lacking a "fourth volume", in 1885 Mommsen had ready another volume on ancient Roman history; it described the imperial provinces. In Germany this work was published as volume five of his Römische Geschichte. In thirteen chapters Mommsen discusses the different provinces of the Roman Empire, each as a stand-alone subject. Here there was no running narrative of political events, often dramatic, as was the case in Mommsen's popular, chronological telling of the Roman Republic in his first three volumes. The English translation was entitled The Provinces of the Roman Empire from Caesar to Diocletion.

In 1992 a 'reconstructed' edition of what would-have-been Mommsen's missing "fourth volume" on the Empire was issued. It was based on newly discovered lecture notes by two of Mommsen's students: Sebastian Hensel (father) and Paul Hensel (son). The two Hensels took notes of lectures on the politics of the Roman Empire delivered by Prof. Mommsen at the University of Berlin from 1882 to 1886. Alexander Demandt discovered them in 1980 at a used bookshop in Nuremberg. As edited by Barbara Demandt and Alexander Demandt, the notes yielded the 'reconstructed' German text, Römische Kaisergeschichte.

=== In English ===
The contemporary English translations were the work of William Purdie Dickson, then the Professor of Divinity at the University of Glasgow. The first three German volumes (which contained five 'books') were published during 1862 to 1866 by R. Bentley & Son, London. Over several decades Prof. Dickson prepared further English editions of this translation, keeping pace with Mommsen's revisions in German. All told, close to a hundred editions and reprints of the English translation have been published.

In 1958 selections from the final two 'books' of the three-volume History were prepared by Dero A. Saunders and John H. Collins for a shorter English version. The content was chosen to highlight Mommsen's telling of the social-political struggles over several generations leading to the fall of the Republic. Provided with new annotations and a revised translation, the book presents an abridgment revealing the historical chronology. With rigor Mommsen is shown narrating the grave political drama and illuminating its implications; the book closes with his lengthy description of the new order of government adumbrated by Julius Caesar.

With regard to Mommsen's 1885 "fifth volume" on the Roman provinces, Prof. Dr. Dickson immediate began to supervise its translation. In 1886 it appeared as The Provinces of the Roman Empire. From Caesar to Diocletian.

Mommsen's missing fourth volume was reconstructed from student notes and published in 1992 under the title Römische Kaisergeschichte. It was soon translated into English by Clare Krojzl as A History of Rome under the Emperors.

== Review of contents ==
=== The Republic ===
With exceptions, Mommsen in his Römische Geschichte (1854–1856) narrates a straight chronology of historic events and circumstances. Often strongly worded, he carefully describes the political acts taken by the protagonists, demonstrates the immediate results, draws implications for the future, while shedding light on the evolving society that surround them. The chronology of the contents of his five 'books' (in his first three volumes) are in brief:

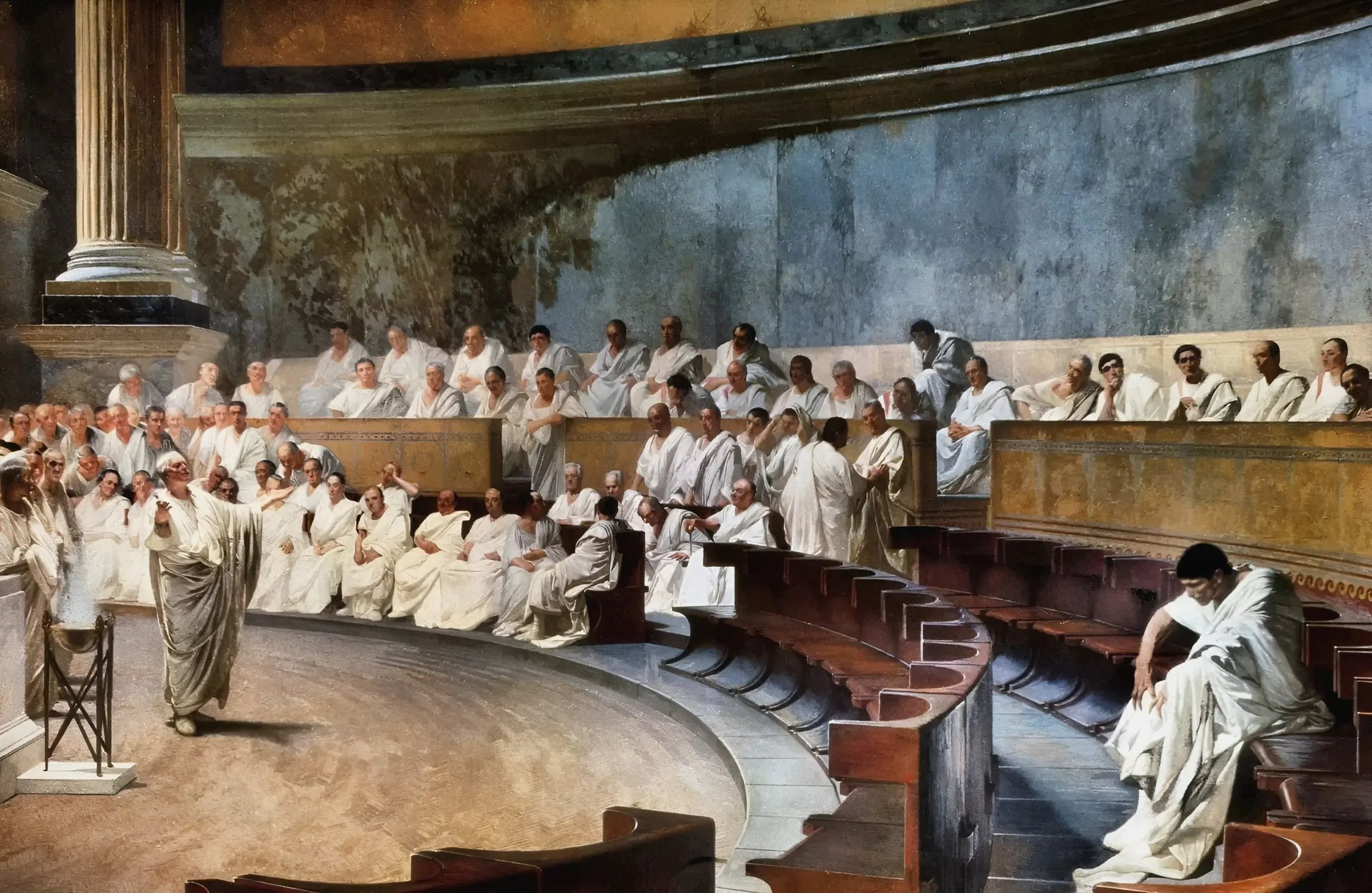
Roman Senate (Cicero attacking Catilina, 63 BCE). 19th-century fresco in Italian Senate at Palazzo Madama.

- Book I, Roman origins and the Monarchy;
- Book II, the Republic until the Union of Italy;
- Book III, the Punic Wars and the East;
- Book IV, the Gracchi, Marius, Drusus, and Sulla;
- Book V, the Civil Wars and Julius Caesar.

The broad strokes of Mommsen's long, sometimes intense narrative of the Roman Republic were summarized at the 1902 award of the Nobel Prize in a speech given by the secretary of the Swedish Academy. At the beginning, the strength of Rome derived from the health of its families, e.g., a Roman's obedience to the state was associated with obedience of son to father. From here Mommsen skillfully unrolls the huge canvas of Rome's long development from rural town to world capital. An early source of stability and effectiveness was the stubbornly preserved constitution; e.g., the reformed Senate composed of patricians and plebeians generally handled public affairs of the city-state in an honorable manner.

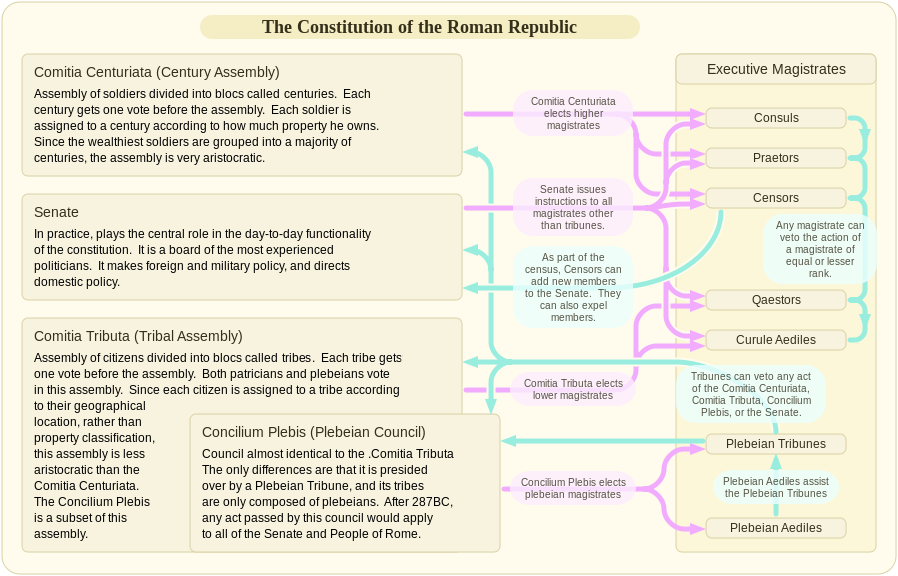
Outline of Roman Constitution

Yet the great expansion of Rome and the consequent transformations worked to subvert the ancient order. Gradually, older institutions grew incapable of effectively meeting new and challenging circumstances, of performing the required civic tasks. The purported sovereignty of the comitia (people's assembly) became only a fiction, which might be exploited by demagogues for their own purposes. In the Senate, the old aristocratic oligarchy began to become corrupted by the enormous wealth derived from military conquest and its aftermath; it no longer served well its functional purpose, it failed to meet new demands placed on Rome, and its members would selfishly seek to preserve inherited prerogatives against legitimate challenge and transition. A frequently unpatriotic capitalism abused its power in politics and by irresponsible speculation. The free peasantry became squeezed by the competing demands of powerful interests; accordingly its numbers began to dwindle, which eventually led to a restructuring of Army recruitment, and later resulted in disastrous consequences for the entire commonwealth.

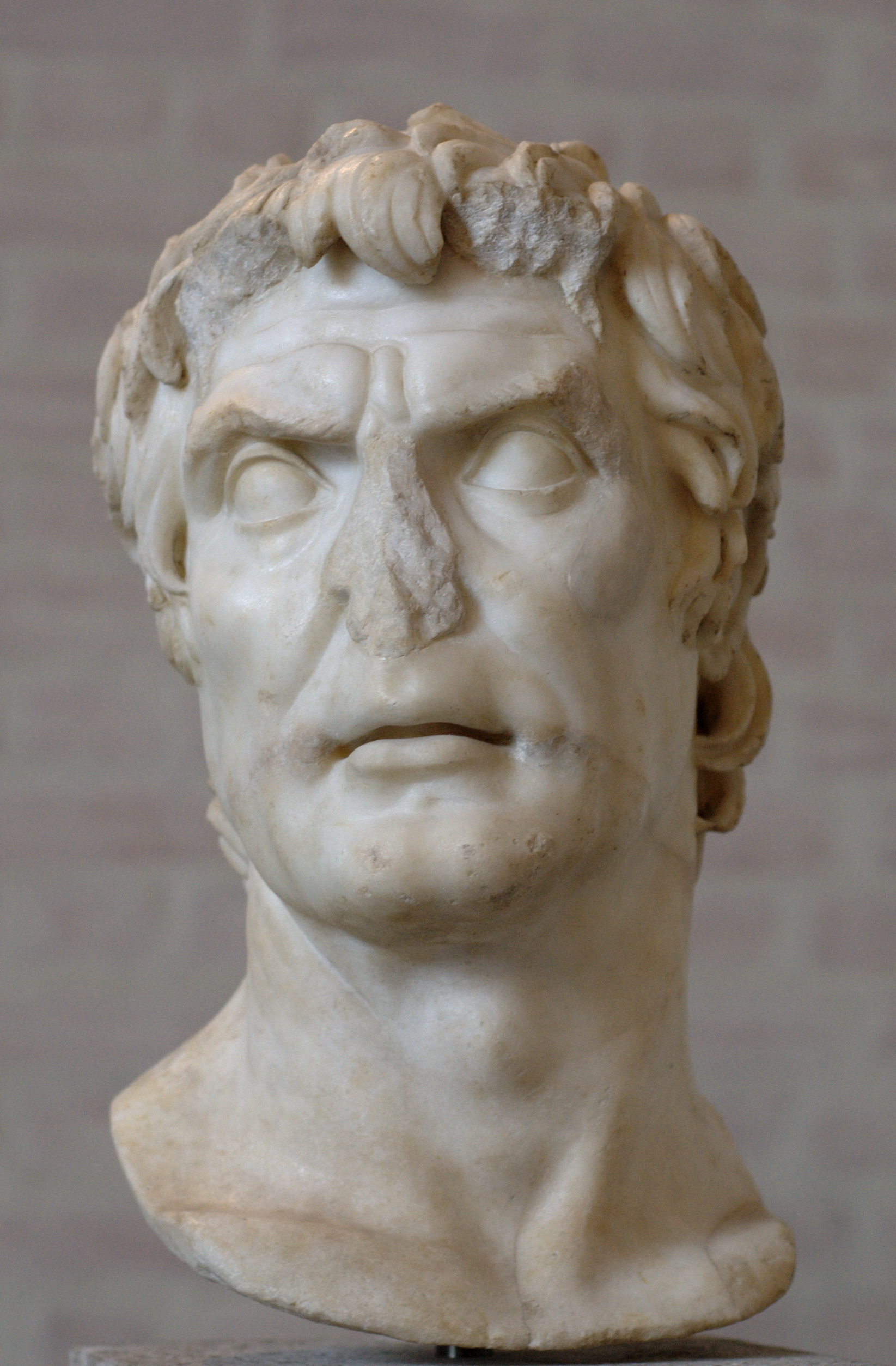
Sulla bust in Munich Glyptothek

Moreover, the annual change of consuls (the two Roman chief executives) began to adversely impact the consistent management of its armed forces, and to weaken their effectiveness, especially in the era following the Punic Wars. Eventually it led to the prolongation of military commands in the field; hence, Roman army generals became increasingly independent, and they led soldiers personally loyal to them. These military leaders began to acquire the ability to rule better than the ineffective civil institutions. In short, the civil power's political capabilities were not commensurate with the actual needs of the Roman state. As Rome's strength and reach increased, the political situation developed in which an absolute command structure imposed by military leaders at the top might, in the long run, in many cases be more successful and cause less chaos and hardship to the citizenry than the corrupt and incompetent rule by the oligarchy of quarreling old families who de facto controlled the government. Such was his purpose when the conservative Optimate, the noble and Roman general Sulla (138–78), seized state power by military force; yet he sought without permanent success to restore the Senate nobility to its former power.

Political instability soon returned, social unrest being the disagreeable norm. The conservative renovation of the Republic's institutions was abandoned and taken apart. Eventually the decisive civil war victory of the incomparable Julius Caesar (100–44), followed by his executive mastery and public-minded reforms, appeared as the necessary and welcome step forward toward resolution of the sorry and bloody débâcle at Rome. This, in the dramatic narrative of Theodore Mommsen.

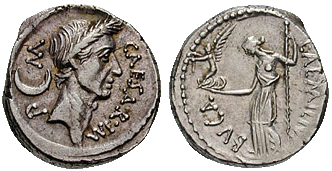
Julius Caesar, obverse; Victory on hand of Venus with sceptre, reverse. Denarius.

Mommsen's penultimate chapter provides an outline of the 'nation building' program begun by Caesar following his victory. Institutions were reformed, the many regions ruled by Rome became more unified in design, as if prepared for a future Empire which would endure for centuries; this, during Caesar's last five and a half years alive. His work at statecraft included the following: the slow pacification of party strife, nonetheless with republican opposition latent and episodically expressed; his assumption of the title Imperator (refusing the crown, yet continuing since 49 as dictator), with reversion of the Senate to an advisory council, and the popular comitia as a compliant legislature, although law might be made by his edicts alone; his assumption of authority over tax and treasury, over provincial governors, and over the capital; supreme jurisdiction (trial and appellate) over the continuing republican legal system, with the judex being selected among senators or equites, yet criminal courts remained corrupted by factional infighting; supreme command over the decayed Roman army, which was reorganized and which remained under civilian control; reform of government finance, of budgeting re income and expense, and of corn distribution; cultivation of civil peace in Rome by control of criminal "clubs", by new city police, and by public building projects. Impossible problems: widespread slavery, disappearance of family farms, extravagance and immorality of the wealthy, dire poverty, speculation, debt; Caesar's reforms: favoring families, against absentees, restricting luxuries, debt relief (but not cancellation as demanded by populares), personal bankruptcy for unpayable debt replacing enslavement by creditors, usury laws, road building, distribution of public agricultural lands in a moderated Gracchan fashion, and new municipal law. Mommsen writes, "[W]e may well conclude that Caesar with his reforms came as near to the measure of what was possible as it was given to a statesman and a Roman to come."

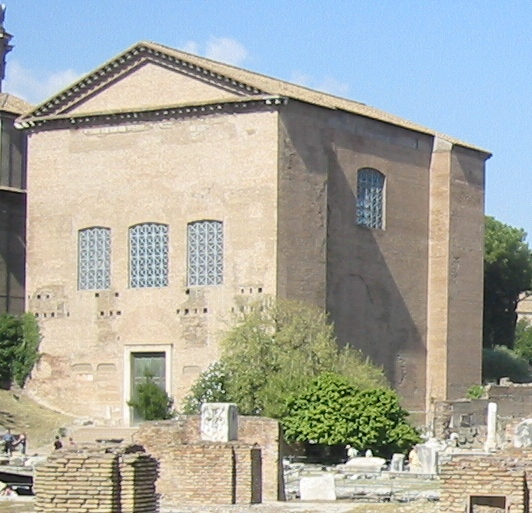
Curia Julia in Forum, seat of Imperial Senate

Regarding the Roman provinces, former misrule and financial plundering is described, committed by Roman government agents and Roman merchants; Caesar's reforms replaced the quasi-independent Roman governors with those selected by the Imperator and closely supervised, with reduction in taxes; provincial oppression by private concerns was found more difficult to arrest. Abatement of the prior popular notion of the provinces as "country estates" to be worked or exploited for Rome's benefit. Favors granted Jews; Latin colonies continue. Cultural joining of Latins and Hellenes; "Italy was converted from the mistress of subject peoples into the mother of the renovated Italo-Hellenic nation." Census of the Mediterranean population under Rome taken; popular religion left free of additional state norms. Continuing development of the Praetor's Edict, and plans for a codification of law. Roman coinage, weights and measures reformed; creation of the Julian Calendar. "The rapidity and self-precision with which the plan was executed prove that it had been long meditated thoroughly and all its parts settled in detail", Mommsen comments. "[T]his was probably the meaning of the words which were heard to fall from him—that he had 'lived enough'."

The exceptions to the straightforward chronology are the periodic digressions in his narrative, where Mommsen inserts separate chapters, each devoted to one or more of a range of particular subjects, for example:

- "The Original Constitution of Rome" (Book I, Chapter 5);
- "The Etruscans" (I, 9);
- "Law and Justice" (I, 11);
- "Religion" (I, 12);
- "Agriculture, Trade, Commerce" (I, 13);
- "Measuring and Writing" (I, 14);

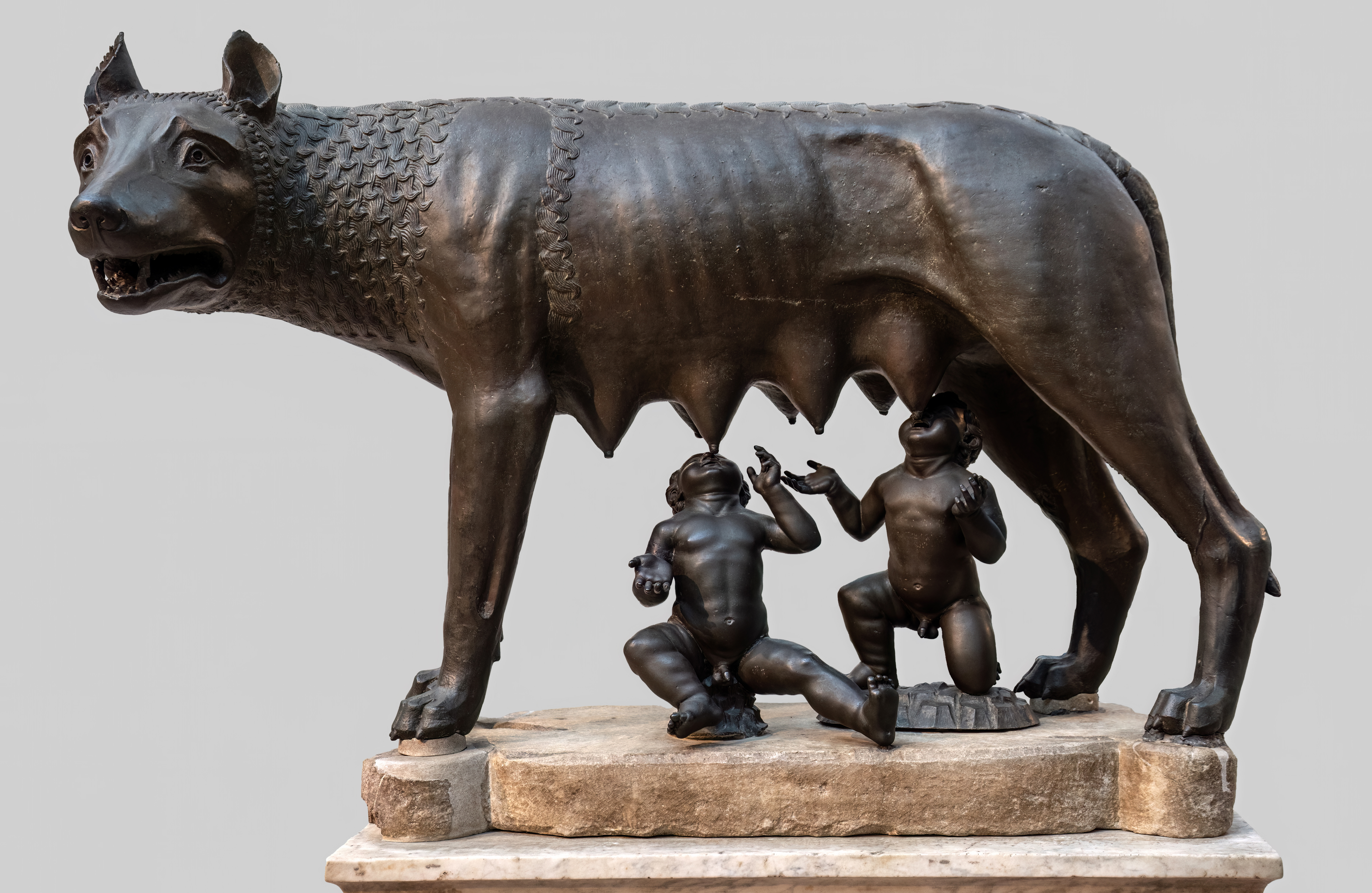
Capitoline Wolf with legendary founders Romulus and Remus

- "The Tribunate of the Plebs and the Decemvirate" (Book II, Chapter 2);
- "Law – Religion – Military System – Economic Condition – Nationality" (II, 8);
- "Art and Science" (II, 9);
- "Carthage" (Book III, Chapter 1);
- "The Government and the Governed" (III, 11);
- "The Management of Land and Capital" (III, 12);
- "Faith and Manners" (III, 13);
- "Literature and Art" (III, 14);
- "The Peoples of the North" (Book IV, Chapter 5);
- "The Commonwealth and its Economy" (IV, 11);
- "Nationality, Religion, Education" (IV, 12);
- "The Old Republic and the New Monarchy" (Book V, Chapter 11);
- "Religion, Culture, Literature, and Art" (V, 12).

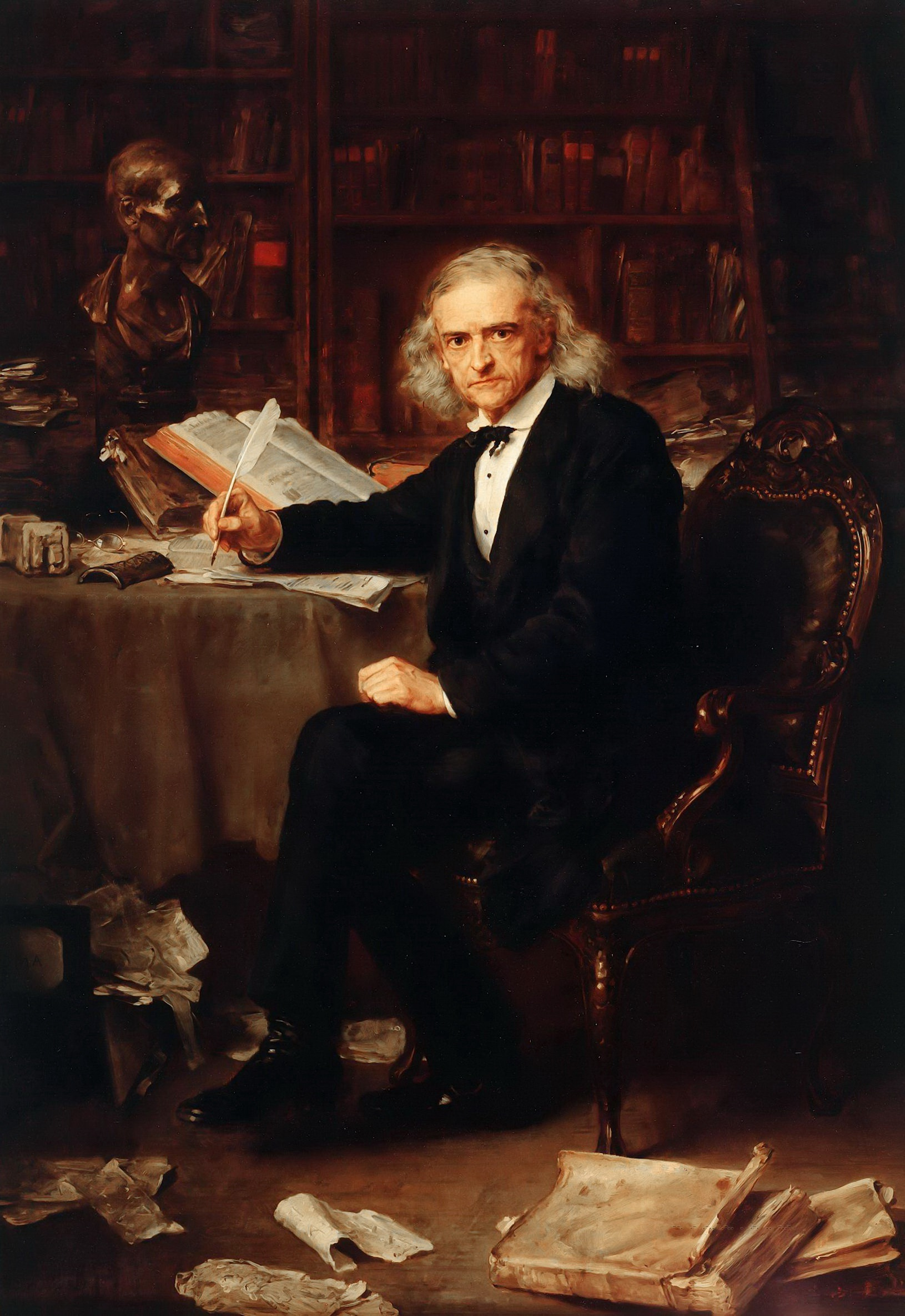
Theodor Mommsen in 1881

Mommsen's expertise in Roman studies was acknowledged by his peers as being both wide and deep, e.g., his direction of the ancient Latin inscriptions project, his work on ancient dialects of Italy, the journal he began devoted to Roman coinage, his multivolume Staatsrecht on the long history of constitutional law at Rome, his volumes on Roman criminal law, the Strafrecht. His bibliography lists 1500 works.

=== The Provinces ===
The Provinces of the Roman Empire (1885, 1886) contains thirteen chapters, namely: Northern Italy, Spain, Gaul, Germany, Britain, the Danube, Greece, Asia Minor, the Euphrates and Parthia, Syria and the Nabataeans, Judaea, Egypt, and the Africa provinces. Generally, each chapter describes the economic geography of the region and its people, before addressing how the Imperial regime adapted to its peculiarities. Regarding the North, military administration is often stressed; while in the East, the focus is more on culture and history.

A quarter of the way into his short "Introduction" to the Provinces Mommsen comments on the decline of Rome, the capital city: "The Roman state of this epoch resembles a mighty tree, the main stem of which, in the course of its decay, is surrounded by vigorous offshoots pushing their way upward." These shoots being the provinces he here describes.

=== The Empire ===
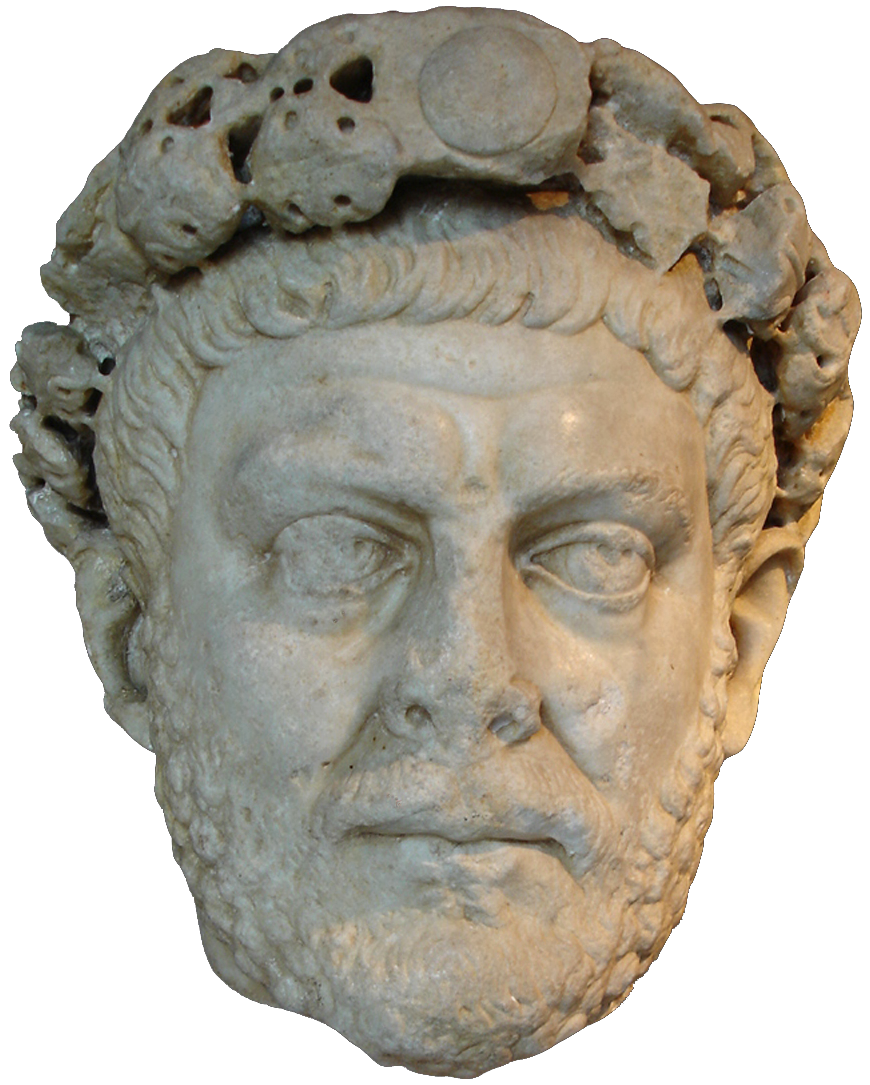
Diocletian (245–313, r.284–305)

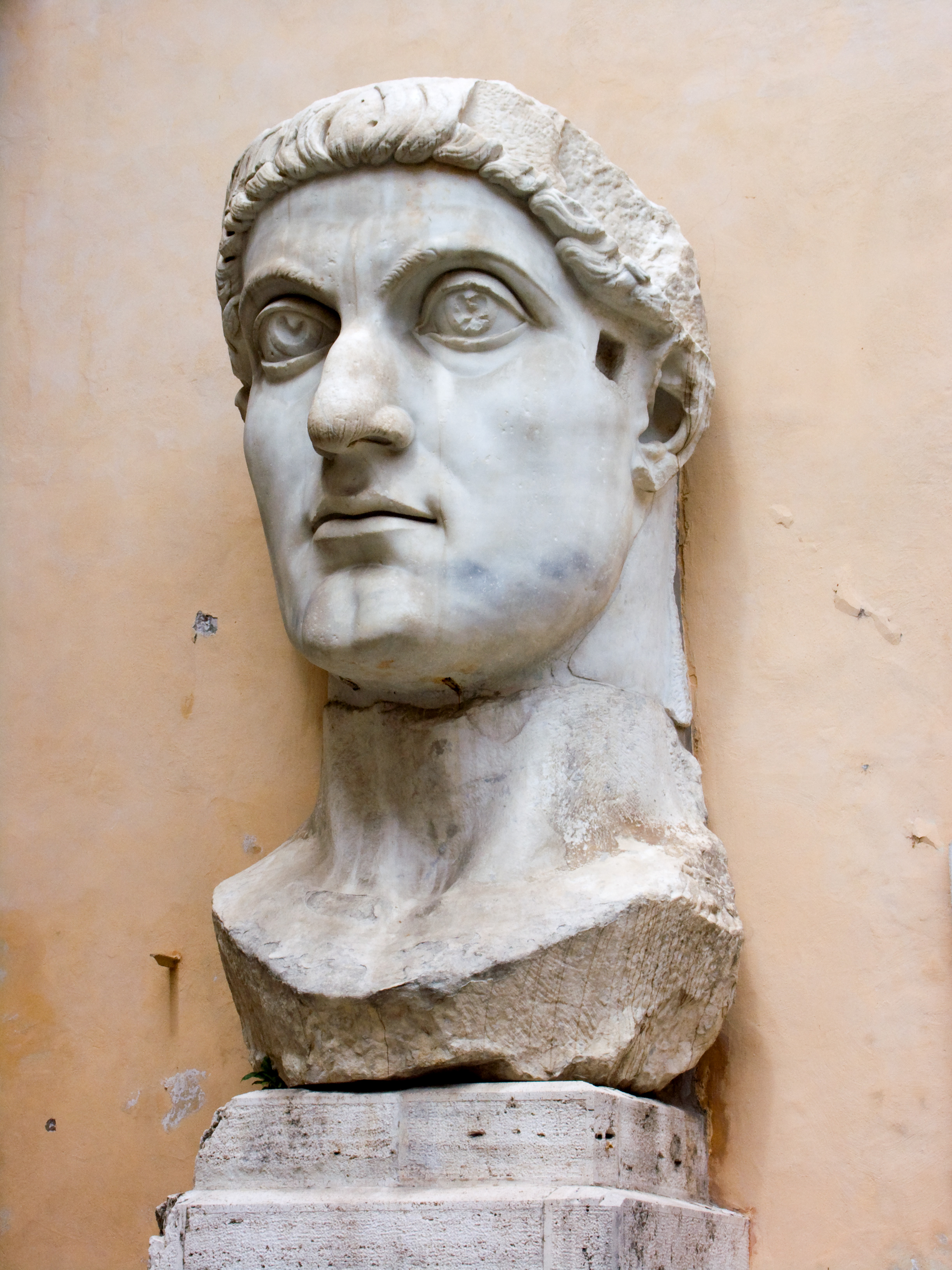
Constantine (272–337)

Mommsen's missing fourth volume, as reconstructed by Barbara Demandt and Alexander Demandt from lecture notes, was published as Römische Kaisergeschichte in 1992. Thus appearing many years after third volume (1856), and the fifth (1885). It contains three sections of roughly equal size.

The first section is arranged chronologically by emperor: Augustus (44 BC – AD 14); Tiberius (14–37); Gaius Caligula (37–41); Claudius (41–54); Nero (54–68); The Year of Four Emperors (68–69); Vespasian (69–79).

The chapters of the second section are entitled: General Introduction; Domestic Politics I; Wars in the West; Wars on the Danube; Wars in the East; Domestic Politics II.

The third section: General Introduction; Government and Society; A History of Events [this the longest subsection, arranged by emperors]: Diocletian (284–305); Constantine (306–337); The sons of Constantine (337–361); Julian and Jovian (355–364); Valentinian and Valens (364–378); From Theodosius to Alaric (379–410).

This rescued work contains a substantial amount of material, in which one follows in the footsteps of a master historian. Because of its nature as reconstructed student lecture notes, it often lacks the polish of literary composition and style, as well as the narrative continuity of the original three volumes. It should be noted, however, that the students involved here in taking the lecture notes were themselves accomplished individuals, and one listener and recorder was already a mature father.

== Roman portraits ==
Several writers have remarked on Mommsen's ability to interpret personality and character. The following highlights are drawn from Mommsen's renderings of figures of ancient Rome, namely: Hannibal, Scipio Africanus, the Gracchi brothers, Marius, Drusus, Sulla, Pompey, Cato, Caesar, and Cicero.

- Hannibal (247–183). Of Carthage, not of Rome, in fact a sworn enemy of Rome, as the Roman people became acquainted with him. No Punic writer has left us an account of him, but only his 'enemies' whether Greek or Roman. Mommsen tells us, "the Romans charged him with cruelty, the Carthaginians with covetousness." It is "true that he hated" and knew "how to hate" and that "a general who never fell short of money and stores can hardly have been less than covetous. But though anger and envy and meanness have written his history, they have not been able to mar the pure and noble image which it presents." His father Hamilcar served Carthage as an army general; Hannibal's "youth had been spent in the camp." As a boy on horseback he'd become "a fearless rider at full speed." In his father's army he had performed "his first feats of arms under the paternal eye". In Hispania his father spent years building colonies for Carthage from which to attack Rome; but the son saw his father "fall in battle by his side." Under his brother-in-law Hasdrubal, Hannibal led cavalry with bravery and brilliance; then Hasdrubal was assassinated. By "the voice of his comrades" Hannibal at 29 years took command of the army. "[A]ll agree in this, that he combined in rare perfection discretion and enthusiasm, caution and energy." His "inventive craftiness" made him "fond of taking singular and unexpected routes; ambushes and stratagems of all sorts were familiar to him." He carefully studied the Roman character. "By an unrivalled system of espionage—he had regular spies even in Rome—he kept himself informed of the projects of his enemy." He was often seen in disguise. Yet nothing he did at war "may not be justified under the circumstances, and according to the international law, of the times." "The power which he wielded over men is shown by his incomparable control over an army of various nations and many tongues—an army which never in the worst of times mutinied against him." Following the war Hannibal the statesman served Carthage to reform the city-state's constitution; later as an exile he exercised influence in the eastern Mediterranean. "He was a great man; wherever he went, he riveted the eyes of all."
- Scipio Africanus (235–183). His father, a Roman general died at war in Hispania; years earlier his son Publius Cornelius Scipio (later Africanus) had saved his life. As then no one offered to succeed to his father's post, the son offered himself. The people's comitia accepted the son for the father, "all this made a wonderful and indelible impression on the citizens and farmers of Rome." Publius Scipio "himself enthusiastic" about others, accordingly "inspired enthusiasm." The Roman Senate acquiesqued to the mere military tribune serving in place of a praetor or consul, i.e., his father. "He was not one of the few who by their energy and iron will constrain the world to adopt and to move in new paths for centuries, or who at any rate grasp the reins of destiny for years till its wheels roll over them." Though he won battles and conquered nations, and became a prominent statesman at Rome, he was not an Alexander or a Caesar. "Yet a special charm lingers around the form of that graceful hero; it is surrounded, as if with a dazzling halo... in which Scipio with mingled credulity and adroitness always moved." His enthusiasm warmed the heart, but he did not forget the vulgar, nor fail to follow his calculations. "[N]ot naïve enough to share the belief of the multitude in his inspirations... yet in secret thoroughly persuaded that he was a man specially favored of the gods." He would accept merely to be an ordinary king, but yet the Republic's constitution applied even to heroes such as him. "[S]o confident of his own greatness that he knew nothing of envy or of hatred, [he] courteously acknowledged other men's merits, and compassionately forgave other men's faults." After his war-ending victory over Hannibal at Zama, he was called Africanus. He was an excellent army officer, a refined diplomat, an accomplished speaker, combining Hellenic culture with Roman. "He won the hearts of soldiers and of women, of his countrymen and of the Spaniards, of his rivals in the Roman Senate and of his greater Carthaginian antagonist. His name was soon on every one's lips, and his was the star which seemed destined to bring victory and peace to his country." Yet his nature seemed to contain "strange mixtures of genuine gold and glittering tinsel." It was said he set "the fashion to the nobility in arrogance, title-hunting, and client-making." In his politics Scipio Africanus "sought support for his personal and almost dynastic opposition to the senate in the multitude." No demagogue, however, he remained content to merely be "the first burgess of Rome".

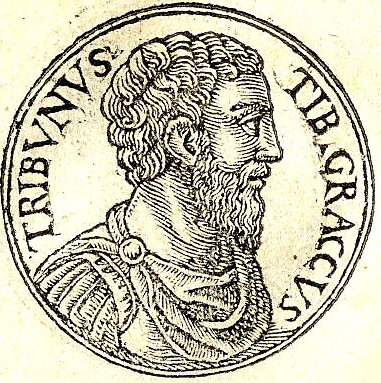
Tiberius Gracchus

- Tiberius Gracchus (163–133). His maternal grandfather was Scipio Africanus. His father Tiberius was twice consul, a powerful man at his death in 150. The young widow Cornelia "a highly cultivated and notable woman" declined marriage to an Egyptian king to raise her children. She was "a highly cultivated and notable woman". Her eldest son Tiberius Sempronius Gracchus "in all his relations and views... belonged to the Scipionic circle" sharing its "refined and thorough culture" which was both Greek and Roman. Tiberius "was of a good and moral disposition, of gentle aspect and quiet bearing, apparently fitted for anything rather than for an agitator of the masses." At that time political reform was widely discussed among aristocrats; yet the senate always avoided it. Tiberius declared for reform. Perhaps he was personally motivated by an incident as questor with the Army on campaign in Hispania: there he had escaped a terrible ordeal because of his elite connections. Reformist ideals of this "young, upright and proud man" were nourished by Hellenic rhetoricians. "[W]hen his intentions became known... there was no want of approving voices, and many a public placard summoned the grandson of Africanus to think of the poor people and the deliverance of Italy." In 134 he became a tribune of the people. "The fearful consequences of the previous misgovernment, the political, military, economic, and moral decay of the burgesses, were just at that time naked and open to the eyes of all. ... So Gracchus immediately after entering on office, proposed the enactment of an agrarian law." The land reform was to benefit small holders, to restore prosperity to the "free farmers" of Italy; it concerned rural state lands de facto long held in the possession of wealthy families both of Rome and of Latin allies. His proposed law seemed to garner senate support, but it was effectively vetoed by another tribune acting on behalf of powerful Roman landowners; twice his bill was vetoed. Tiberius Gracchus then turned to the people's assembly, which deposed the offending tribune and itself passed the land reform law.

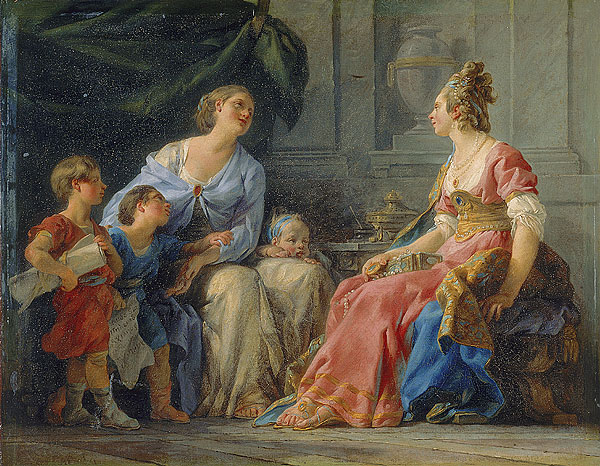
Cornelia and her children: Tiberius and Gaius Gracchus, and eldest Sempronia

"Rome about this period was governed by the senate. Anyone who carried a measure of administration against the majority of the senate made a revolution. It was revolution against the spirit of the constitution, when Gracchus submitted the domain question to the people; and revolution also against... the tribunician veto." Too, the people's assembly was a great tumultuous crowd and unfit to pass legislation. Yet senate governance had become so corrupt that a person who would replace it "might benefit the commonwealth more than he injured it. ¶ But such a bold player Tiberius Gracchus was not. He was a tolerably capable, thoroughly well-meaning, conservative patriot, who simply did not know what he was doing." Angry aristocrats from the senate caught and clubbed to death Gracchus; 300 other reformers died with him. The senate then closed ranks, saying that Tiberius Gracchus "had wished to seize the crown."

Yet the land commission mandated by the reform law of Tiberius was allowed to meet and for several years managed to substantially increase the number of small farmers who owned their own land. Scipio Aemilianus (184–129), an in-law and adopted grandson of Scipio Africanus and thus cousin to the Gracchi, played an ambiguous rôle. A good soldier, fine orator, trustworthy, and known for steadfast probity, his politics put him in between the aristocracy and the reformers. Against the oligarchy he brought the ballot to criminal proceedings before popular tribunals. Yet he mostly opposed land reforms; "rightly or wrongly, the remedy seemed to him worse than the disease." Eventually on behalf of allied Latin landowners he influenced the termination of the land commission. As a result he, too, was assassinated—probably by a land reformer.

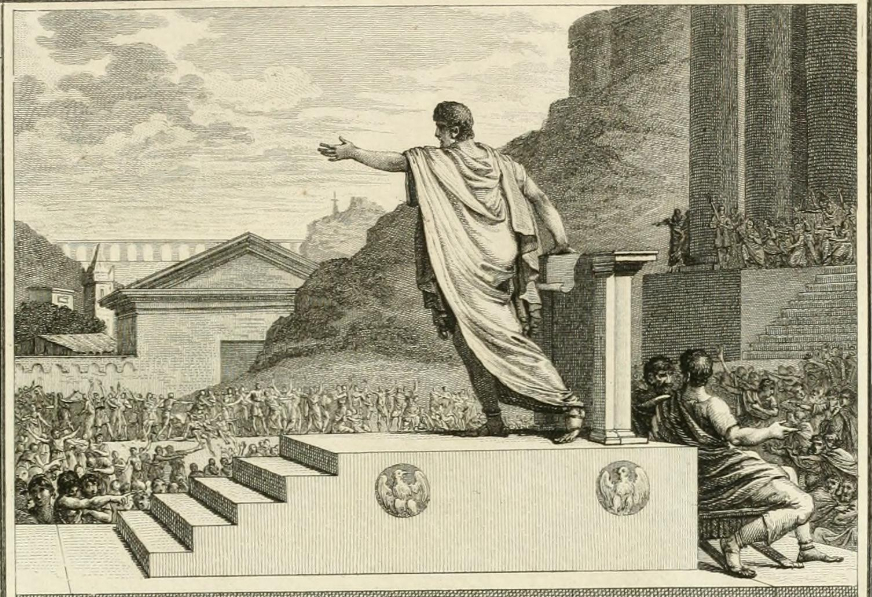
Gaius Gracchus before the Concilium Plebis

- Gaius Gracchus (154–121). Gaius was the younger brother of Tiberius Gracchus, and the second son of Cornelia. Gaius set himself the project of reforming the constitutional order of the Senate and People of Rome.

{Under construction}

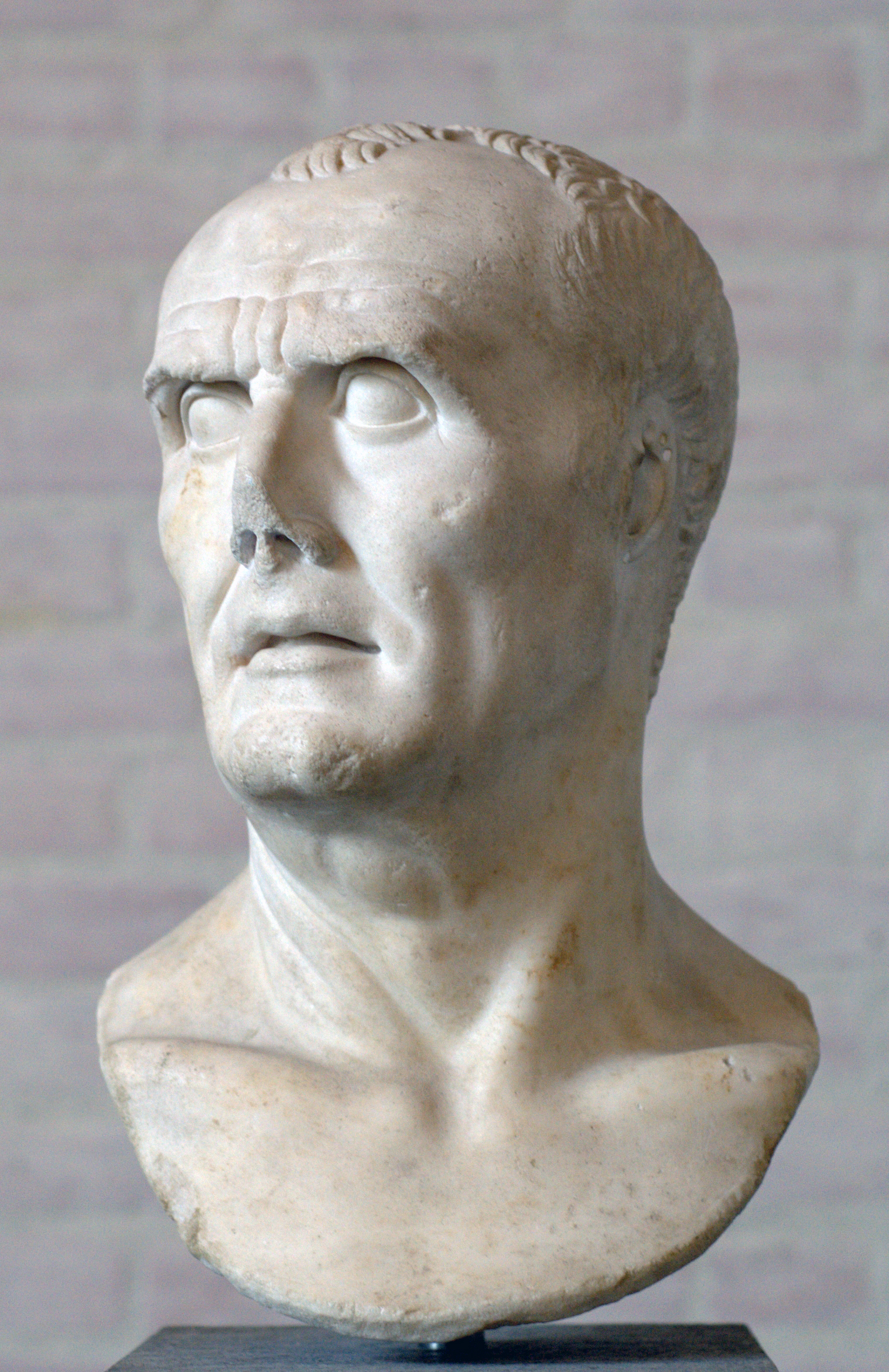
Gaius Marius. Bust in Glyptothek at Munich.

- Gaius Marius (157–86). "Son of a poor day-labourer" in an Italian village, Marius was "reared at the plough". He joined the army as soon as he could. Noted for his ability and fine appearance, he served during campaigns in Hispania and by age 23 became an officer. Back home, he planned an army career, but regardless of merit he "could not attain those political offices, which alone led to the higher military posts, without wealth and without connections. The young officer acquired both by fortunate commercial speculations and by his union with a maiden of the ancient patrician clan of the Julii." In 115 he served as praetor and in 107 as consul. In Africa he then led an army; serving under him was Sulla, who captured Jugurtha which ended the war. Again Marius became consul, for an unprecedented four consecutive terms (104–101), during which in Germania he led an army to victory. "[A] brave and upright man, who administered justice impartially", he was "uncorruptable." "[A] skillful organizer... an able general, who kept the soldier under discipline [and] at the same time won his affections... [Marius] looked the enemy boldly in the face and joined issue with him at the proper time." Not a man of "eminent military capacity", he enjoyed "the reputation for such capacity."

"[Marius took a place] of unparalelled honour among the consulars and the triumphators. But he was none the better fitted on that account for the brilliant circle. His voice remained harsh and loud, and his look wild, as if he still saw before him Libyans or Cimbrians, and not well-bred and perfumed colleagues. ... [H]is want of political culture was unpardonable... what was to be thought of a consul who was so ignorant of constitutional etiquette as to appear in triumphal costume in the senate! In other respects too the plebeian character clung to him. He was not merely—according to aristocratic phraseology—a poor man, but, what was worse, frugal, and a declared enemy of all bribery and corruption. After the manner of soldiers he was not nice, but was fond of his cups... he knew not the art of giving feasts, and kept a bad cook. It was likewise awkward that the consular understood nothing but Latin and declined conversation in Greek. ... Thus he remained throughout his life a countryman cast adrift among aristocrats."

Marius, "a farmer by birth and a soldier by inclination", started out as no revolutionary. Yet the "hostile attacks of the aristocracy had no doubt driven him subsequently into the camp of [their] opponents" where "he speedily found himself elevated" as the new popular leader. "[T]he men of quality acknowledged his services" in gaining crucial military victories. Yet "with the people he was more popular than any one before or after him, popular alike by his virtues and by his faults, by his unaristocratic disinterestedness no less than by his boorish roughnesss; he was called by the multitude a third Romulus." Meanwhile, "the wretched government oppressed the land more heavily than did the barbarians." On Marius, "the first man of Rome, the favorite of the people... devolved the task of once more delivering Rome." His "sensuous passion" was stirred. Yet to this rustic and soldier "the political proceedings of the capital were strange and incongruous: he spoke ill as he commanded well." Firmer he was "in the presence of lances and swords" that amid "applause and hisses". "[I]f he would not deceive the expectations of his party" and "if he would not be unfaithful to his own sense of duty, he must check the maladministration of public affairs."

Yet his efforts at social reform would end very badly. "He knew neither the art of gaining his antagonists, nor that of keeping his own party in subjection." He stirred the proletariat to unworthy acts beyond the law; although he nobly shrank from the excess, he accepted the results. Once popular, a "gallant man", he slowly came to be seen in a different light, as a "laughing-stock". Later, during his seventh consulship in 86, many of his political opponents were murdered. "He had taken vengeance on the whole genteel pack that embittered his victories and envenomed his defeats". Regretfully Marius at last emerged as "the crackbrained chief of a reckless band of robbers" which earned him "the hatred of the entire nation".

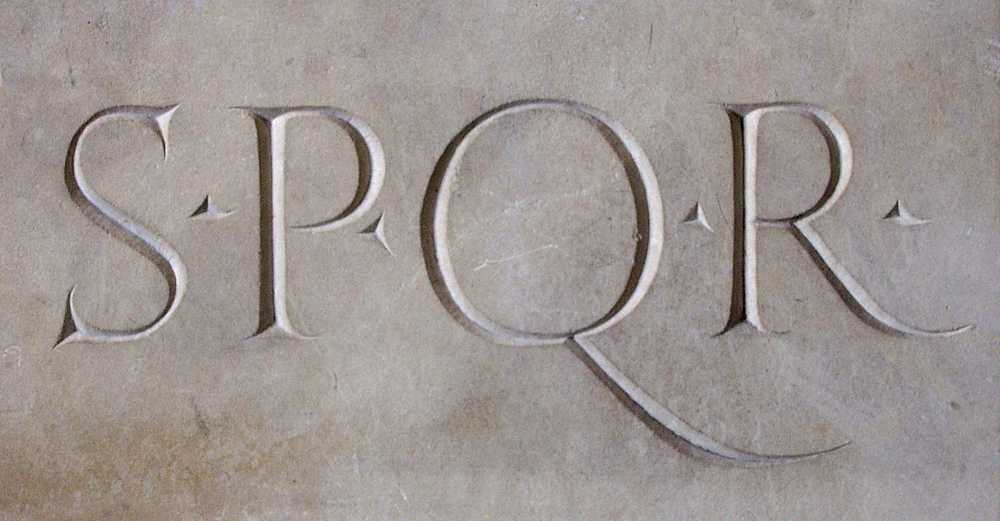

- Livius Drusus (d.91). His father of the same name, acting as tribune but on behalf of the Senate, had sponsored rival programs and "caused the overthrow of Gaius Gracchus." The son also held "strictly conservative views." "He belonged to the circle of the highest nobility and possessed a colossal fortune; in disposition too he was a genuine aristocrat—a man emphatically proud." Yet he followed "the beautiful saying, that nobility implies obligation." He had in earnest turned away from the "frivolity" common to elite society. "[T]rustworthy and strict in morals, he was respected rather than properly beloved" by the common people, "to whom his door and his purse were always open." Later he became tribune; as political events unfolded Drusus became less an antagonist and more the disciple of the late Gaius Gracchus. He championed reforms to remedy the corruption in the courts caused by equite merchants (who then acted as the judex); to this reform he added the grant of Roman citizenship to Italians. After the apparent victory of these reforms in the senate, followed by their repeal, while yet vigorous he was murdered. Following his death the Social War started throughout Italy over citizenship rights.

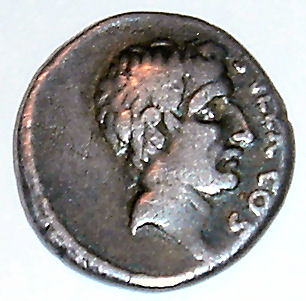
Cornelius Sulla. Roman denarius.

- Cornelius Sulla (158–78).

{Under construction}

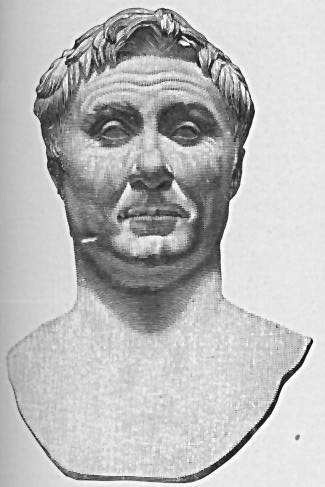
Pompey. Bust, Ny Carlsberg Glyptotek, Copenhagen.

- Pompeius Magnus (106–48). His father was Pompeius Strabo, a consul who earned a triumph in the Social War. Pompey himself came into great public prominence during his 20s under the rule of Sulla. He was neither an "unconditional adherent" nor an "open opponent" of Sulla, who "half in recognition, half in irony" first called Pompey 'the Great'. Sound in body and mind, a good athlete, a skilled rider and fencer, the youthful Pompey had won extraordinary military honors and public acclaim. "Unhappily, his mental endowments by no means corresponded with these unprecedented successes. He was neither a bad nor an incapable man, but a man thoroughly ordinary." An "excellent soldier", he was "without trace of any higher gifts." As commander Pompey was cautious and delivered "the decisive blow only when he had established an immense superiority". "His integrity was of a rich man... too rich to incur special risks, or draw down on himself conspicuous disgrace". His reputation for "integrity and disinterestness" came less from his virtue than from a senate rife with vice. Yet as a landowner he was fair-minded; he did not join "revolting schemes in which the grandess of that age" expanded their domains by infringing on their "humbler neighbors". A good man, "he displayed attachment to his wife and children." He was "the first to depart from the barbarous custom of putting to death the captive kings" of countries fighting Rome. "His 'honest countenance' became almost proverbial." Yet at Sulla's command Pompey quit his beloved wife and then later ordered the execution of soldiers loyal to him, all due to Sulla and politics. He was not cruel, but he was cold. A shy man, "he spoke in public not without embarrassment; and generally was angular, stiff, and awkward in intercourse." "For nothing was he less qualified than for a statesman." His aims uncertain, unable to decide on means, short sighted, "he was wont to conceal his irresolution and indecision under a cloak of solemn silence." He often would "deceive himself that he was deceiving others." Like Marius, "Pompeius was in every respect incapable of leading and keeping together a [political] party."

His exalted social position also remained fundamentally ambivalent. Allied to the aristocracy by his consular ancestry and through Sulla, he disliked Sulla personally and worked against the Sullan constitution, and his family gens was of recent vintage and not fully accepted by the nobility. Pompey maintained links to the Populares and joined Caesar in the triumvirate. Yet, to the contrary, he was well suited to associate with the senate oligarchy because his "dignified outward appearance, his solemn formality, his personal bravery, his decorous private life, his want of all initiative" and his "mediocrity, so characteristic of the genuine Optimate". An "affinity" existed, "subsisted at all times between Pompeius, [the] burgesses and the senate." Pompeius, however, refused to fit in. "[S]eized with giddiness on the height of glory which he had climbed with dangerous rapidity and ease", he began to compare himself to Alexander the Great, and far above any senator. "His political position was utterly perverse." He was conflicted; "deeply indignant when persons and laws did not bend unconditionally before him" he nonetheless "trembled at the mere thought of doing anything unconstitutional." His "much agitated life passed joylessly away in a perpetual inward contradiction." Pompey for Mommsen was the "most tiresome and most starched of all artificial great men." He died before his wife and son, when one of his old soldiers stabbed him from behind as he stepped ashore in Egypt. "Of all pitiful parts there is none more pitiful than that of passing for more than one really is."

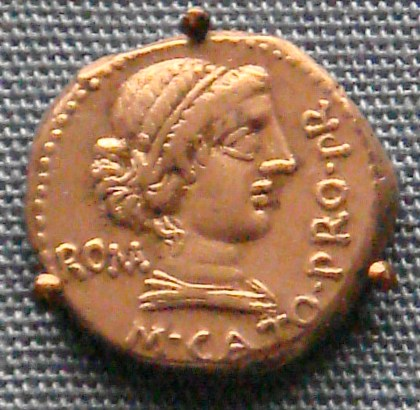
Cato Uticensis. Silver denarius issued 47–46.

- Cato Uticensis (95–46). His mother's brother was the reformer Livius Drusus. His father's grandfather was the famous censor, Cato the Elder (234–149). Here, Cato (also called 'the Younger') was a rare man among the aristocracy, "a man of the best intentions and of rare devotedness", yet Quixotic and cheerless. Although honourable, steadfast, earnest, and strongly attached "to country and to its hereditary constitution" he possessed little practical understanding. Cato, "dull in intellect and sensuously as well as morally destitute of passion", might have made "a tolerable state accountant." Walking "in the sinful capital as a model citizen and mirror of virtue" he would 'scold' those out of line. His ancestor Cato the Elder worked as a farmer, his anger had made him an orator; wielder of plough and sword, in politics "his narrow, but original and sound common sense ordinarily hit the nail on the head." The younger Cato, however, inspired by the example of his great-grandfather, made a "strange caricature" of him. Formal and philosophical, a follower of the Stoa, the younger Cato would speak in "scholastic wisdom" and appeared as "this cloud-walker in the realm of abstract morals." Yet like his ancestor, he began "to travel on foot instead of riding, to take no interest, to decline badges of distinction as a soldier", and like the legendary king Romulus to appear shirtless. In "an utterly wretched and cowardly age his courage and his negative virtues told powerfully with the multitude." As "the only conservative of note who possessed if not talent and insight, at any rate integrity and courage... he soon became the champion of the Optimate party." He never missed a senate meeting, and "as long as he lived he checked the details of the public budget." Yet unfortunately in politics he simply lacked common sense. Cato's tactics seemed to consist of nothing more than "setting his face against every one who deviated" from the traditional catechism of the aristocracy, which of course worked as much against the Optimates as for them. By his character and his actions this "Don Quixote of the aristocracy" proved the exhaustion of senate politics.

After Caesar's victory at Thapsus ending the civil war, Cato tended to the welfare of the republican remnant at Utica, then took his own life by the sword. "Cato was anything but a great man." Yet he was the only man who "honourably and courageously championed in the last struggle the great republican system doomed to destruction." "Cato has played a greater part in history than many men far superior to him in intellect. It only heightens the deep and tragic significance of his death that he was himself a fool; in truth it is just because Don Quixote is a fool that he is a tragic figure." Yet Cato inspired the republican protest against Caesar's victory, which "tore asunder like gossamer all that so-called constitutional character with which Caesar invested his monarchy", and exposed as hypocritical "the reconciliation of all parties" under the Empire. "The unrelenting warfare which the ghost of the legitimate republic waged for centuries" against the Empire, from Cassius and Brutus to Thrasea and Tacitus, "a warfare of plots and of literature" was Cato's legacy. Soon after his death this "republican opposition" began to "revere as a saint" Cato who in life was frequently a "laughing-stock" and a "scandal". "But the greatest of these marks of respect was the involuntary homage which Caesar rendered to him, when he made an exception in the contemptuous clemency" he offered defeated opponents. Cato alone he pursued even beyond the grave "with that energetic hatred which practical statesmen are wont to feel toward antagonists opposing them from a region of ideas which they regard as equally dangerous and impracticable."

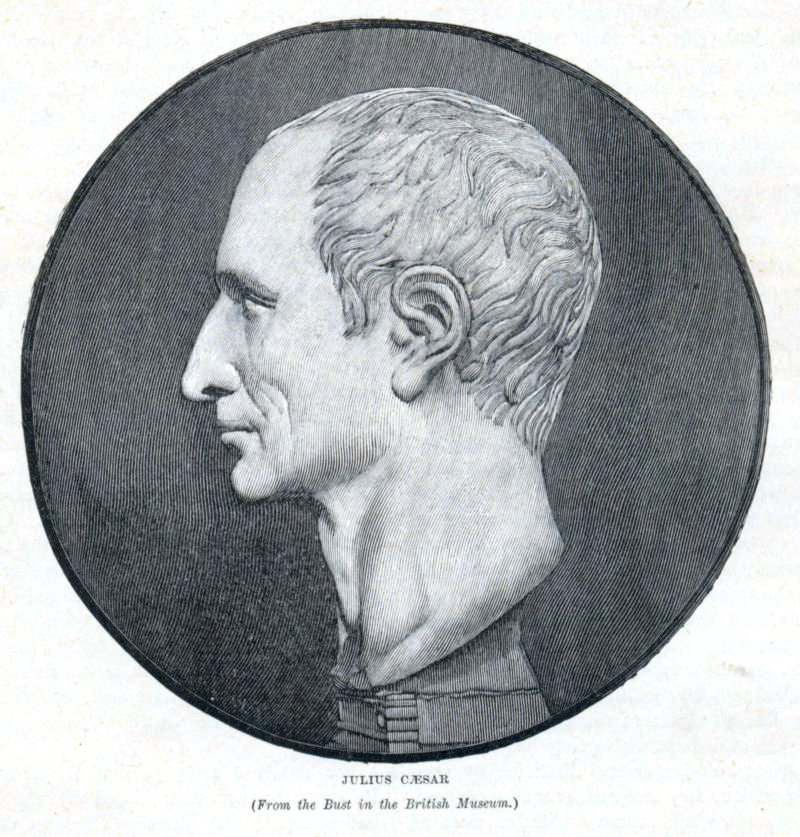
Julius Caesar, British Museum

- Gaius Julius Caesar (100–44),

{Under construction}

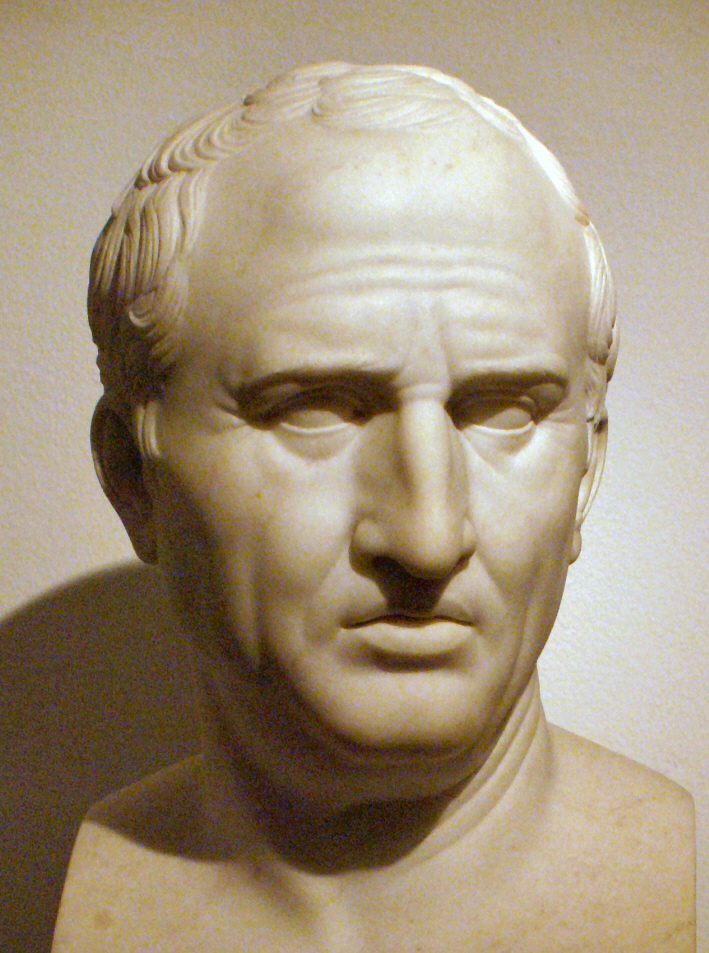
Cicero, copy by Bertel Thorvaldsen, Copenhagen

- Tullius Cicero (106–43). An opportunist, "accostomed to flirt at times with the democrats, at times... with the aristocracy, and to lend his services as an advocate to every influential man under impeachment without distinction of person or party". Wealth and commerce were then "dominant in the courts" and the lawyer Cicero had made himself well accomplished as "the eloquent pleader" and "the courtly and witty champion." He was not an aristocrat, but a novus homo; he belonged to no party, but cultivated connections enough among both optimates and populares. Elected consul in 63, he ducked legal responsibility in the Catilina conspiracy. "As a statesman without insight, idea, or purpose, Cicero figured successively as democrat, as aristocrat, and as a tool of the triumvirate, and was never more than a short-sighted egoist." "He was valiant in opposition to sham attacks, and he knocked down many walls of pasteboard with a loud din; no serious matter was ever, either in good or evil, decided by him". In Latin, "his importance rests on his mastery of style". Yet as an author, he was "a dabbler", a "journalist in the worst sense of that term", and "poor beyond all conception in ideas". His letters "reflect the urban or villa life of the world of quality" yet remain in essence "stale and empty". As an orator "Cicero had no conviction and no passion; he was nothing but an advocate". He published his court pleadings; his orations can be "easy and agreeable reading." He used anecdote to excite sentimentality, "to enliven the dry business" of law "by cleverness or witticisms mostly of a personal sort". Yet "the serious judge" will find such "advantages of a very dubious value" considering his "want of political discernment in the orations on constitutional questions and of juristic deduction in the forensic addresses, the egotism forgetful of its duty... [and] the dreadful barrenness of thought". Yet as a "mouthpiece" for politicians Cicero "was useful on account of his lawyer's talent of finding a reason, or at any rate words, for everything."

Nonetheless Momsen acknowledges that those works of Cicero which are presented in the "stylistic dialogue" form are "not devoid of merit". De Oratore and other rhetorical writings contain "a store of practical forensic experience and forensic anecdotes of all sorts easily and tastefully set forth, and in fact solve the problem of combining didactic instruction with amusement." Cicero's treatise De Republica presents a then popular idea "that the existing constitution of Rome is substantially the ideal state-organisation sought for by the philosophers." Yet it is "a singular mongrel compound of history and philosophy." Relying on the Greeks for both ideas and literary devices, De Republica contains "comparative originality, inasmuch as the elaboration shows throughout Roman local colouring, and the proud consciousness of political life, which the Roman was certainly entitled to feel as compared with the Greeks." In these dialogues Cicero's fictional advocates are shown gathered, including statesmen from the Scipionic circle, which "furnish a lively and effective framework... for the scientific discussion."

== Commentary I ==
Writers have described Mommsen's history as transformative of prior works on ancient Rome. He employed new sources, e.g., ancient inscriptions, in order to gain new insights. He also wrote in a new fashion. Yet his point of view itself was new, a product of his own life and times, a 19th-century outlook from middle Europe. From the vantage point of our latter era, the 19th-century view presents a result that appears now as somewhat of a distortion. On the other hand, each individual's outlook will necessarily encompass unique insights.

=== New sources ===
Mommsen followed by a generation the historian Barthold Niebuhr, who had made significant advances in Roman studies. Niebuhr elevated the standards of scholarship and, in doing so, brought to light the lack of rigor of earlier work. He insisted on investigating the original sources. By his perceptive questioning, he challenged the surviving Latin and Greek historical literature, especially regarding earliest Rome. Niebuhr sifted it carefully in order to separate out what genuinely reflected the actual events: stories sourced in persons with personal knowledge, as opposed to inventions created apart from the event and containing suspect information, e.g., legend or folktales thoroughly scrambled with myth and fiction. He relied in part on the emerging field of source criticism to shed new light on the old writings. Niebuhr's Roman History was highly praised.

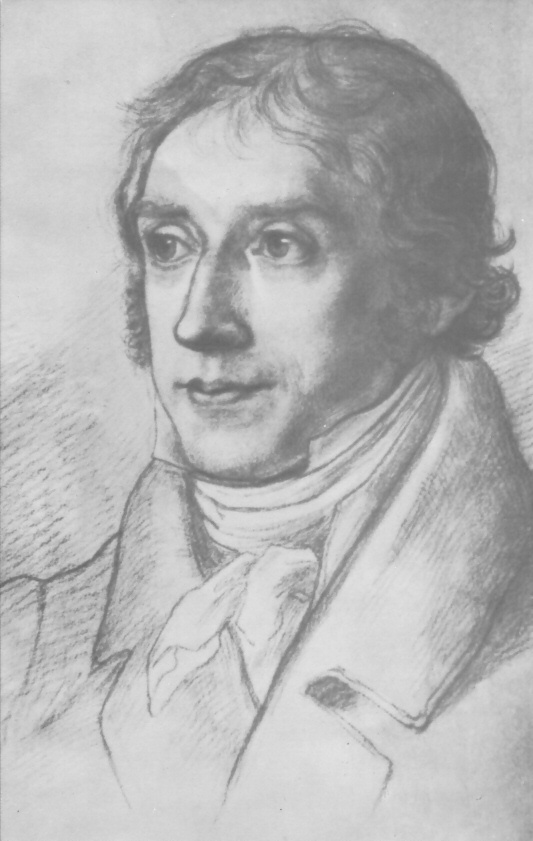
Barthold Niebuhr (1776–1831)

Yet Mommsen outdid Niebuhr. Mommsen sought to create a new category of material evidence on which to build an account of Roman history, i.e., in addition to the literature and art. Of chief importance were the many surviving Latin inscriptions, often on stone or metal. Also included were the Roman ruins, and the various Roman artefacts ranging from pottery and textiles, to tools and weapons. Mommsen encouraged the systematic investigation of these new sources, combined with on-going developments in philology and legal history. Much on-going work was furthering this program: inscriptions were being gathered and authenticated, site work performed at the ruins, and technical examination make of the objects. From a coordinated synthesis of these miscellaneous studies, historical models might be constructed. Such modeling would provide historians with an objective framework independent of the ancient texts, by which to determine their reliability. Information found in the surviving literature then could be for the first time properly scrutinized for its truth value and accordingly appraised.

"[T]hrough comparative linguistics, numismatics, and epigraphy, Mommsen was trying to create a body of material which had the status of archival evidence and which would serve as a control on the narratives of historical writers such as Livy and Appian. Their narratives had already been subjected to scrutiny by earlier scholars, of whom the most significant was Barthold Georg Niebuhr (1776–1831). ... Niebuhr's method had been to apply the principles of "Source Criticism" to unravel contradictions in the traditional account, and then to explain them by applying models developed in the light of his own experience, e.g., of conscription in a peasant society. Mommsen's work sought to establish entirely new categories of evidence for the use of the historian."

The Mommsen's work won immediate, widespread acclaim, but the praise it drew was not unanimous. "While the public welcomed the book with delight and scholars testified to its impeccable erudition, some specialists were annoyed at finding old hypotheses rejected... ." Mommsen omits much of the foundation legends and other tales of early Rome, because he could find no independent evidence to verify them. He thus ignored a scholarly field that was seeking a harmonized view using merely ancient writers. Instead Mommsen's Römische Geschichte presented only events from surviving literature that could be somehow checked against other knowledge gained elsewhere, e.g., from inscriptions, philology, or archaeology.

"[The book] astonished and shocked professional scholars by its revolutionary treatment of the misty beginnings of Rome, sweeping away the old legends of the kings and heroes and along with them the elaborate critical structure deduced from those tales by Barthold Niebuhr, whose reputation as the grand master of Roman history was then sacrosanct. It replaced the critical work of Niebuhr with a far more penetrating criticism and a profounder body of inference."

Work continues, in the trans-generational historians to understand what could be understood from what is left of the ancient world, including the works of the more ancient historians. To be self-aware of how the approach of ancient evidence, this is included in the challenge.

=== Novel style ===
There were academics who disapproved of its tone. "It was indeed the work of a politician and journalist as well as of a scholar." Before writing the History, Mommsen had participated in events during the unrest of 1848 in Germany, a year of European-wide revolts; he had worked editing a periodical which involved politics. Later Mommsen became a member of the Prussian legislature and eventually of the Reichstag. Mommsen's transparent comparison of ancient to modern politics is said to distort, his terse style to be journalistic, i.e., not up to the standard to be achieved by the professional academic.

About his modernist tone, Mommsen wrote: "I wanted to bring down the ancients from the fantastic pedestal on which they appear into the real world. That is why the consul had to become the burgomaster." As to his partisanship, Mommsen replied: "Those who have lived through historical events... see that history is neither written nor made without love and hate." To the challenge that he favored the political career of Julius Caesar, Mommsen referred to the corruption and dysfunction of the tottering Republic: "When a Government cannot govern, it ceases to be legitimate, and he who has the power to overthrow it has also the right." He further clarified, stating the Caesar's role must be considered as the lesser of two evils. As an organism is better than a machine "so is every imperfect constitution which gives room for the free self-determination of a majority of citizens infinitely [better] than the most humane and wonderful absolutism; for one is living, and the other is dead." Thus, the Empire would only hold together a tree without sap.

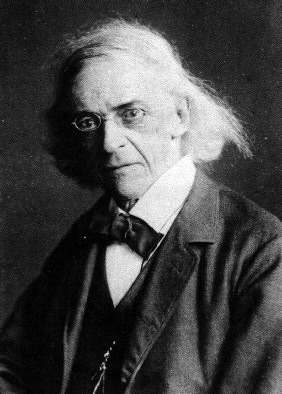
Theodor Mommsen

=== Roman parties ===
"In only one important aspect", Saunders and Collins hold, "did Mommsen fall into serious error." They note that 'most' scholars have faulted Mommsen for his depiction of the Roman party system during the late Republic. They readily admit that the Senate was dominated by a hardcore of 'aristocrats' or the 'oligarchy', who also nearly monopolized the chief offices of government, e.g., consul, by means of family connection, marriage alliance, wealth, or corruption. Such "men may be said to have formed a 'party' in the sense that they had at least a common outlook—stubborn conservatism." They contended vainly among themselves for state 'honors' and personal greed, "forming cliques and intrigues in what amounted to a private game". Such Senate 'misrule' subverted Rome, causing prolonged wrongs and injustice that "aroused sporadic and sometimes massive and desperate opposition. But the opposition was never organized into a party. ... [T]here was no clear political tradition running from the Gracchi through Marius to Caesar."

The classicist Lily Ross Taylor addresses this issue, as follows. Cicero, to refer to these two rival political groups, continually used the Latin word partes [English "parties"]. Cicero (106–43) was a key figure in Roman politics who wrote volumes about it. In distinguishing the two groups, he employed the Latin terms optimates for proponents of the Senate nobility and populares for elite proponents of the popular demos or commoners. She points to the Roman historians Sallust (86–34) and Livy (59 BC-AD 17) for partial confirmation, as well as to later writers Plutarch (c.46–120), Appian (c.95-c.165), and Dio (c.155-c.235), and later still Machiavelli (1469–1527).

These rival political groups, Prof. Taylor states, were quite amorphous, as Mommsen well knew. In fact when Mommsen wrote his Römische Geschichte (1854–1856) political parties in Europe and America were also generally amorphous, being comparatively unorganized and unfocused, absent member allegiance and often lacking programs. Yet in the 20th century modern parties grew better organized with enduring policies, so that their comparison with ancient Rome has become more and more tenuous. She describes Mommsen:

"Theodor Mommsen... presented party politics of the late [Roman] republic in terms of the strife of his own day between liberalism and the reaction that won the battle in 1848. Mommsen identified the Roman optimates with the hated Prussian Junkers and aligned himself with Caesar against them. But he fully recognized the lack of principle or program among the populares. He well understood the amorphous character of the Roman 'parties'. The parties that he knew in Prussia and in other German states were almost equally amorphous."

As Prof. Taylor continues, since Mommsen's wrote modern party 'tickets' and party 'lines' have grown more disciplined, and "the meaning of party had undergone a radical change. Thus the terms 'optimate' and 'popular' party are misleading to the modern reader. [¶] Lately there has been protest against the attribution of parties to Rome. The protest has gone too far." That is, the above-stated divisions were strong and constellated politics during the last century of the Roman Republic.

=== Revolution(s) ===
In 1961 the British historian Edward Hallett Carr published his What is History?, which became well known. Therein Carr conjectured that the very nature of writing history will cause historians as a whole to reveal themselves to their readers as 'prisoners' subject to the context of their own age and culture. As a consequence, one may add, every generation feels the need to rewrite history so that it better fits their own situation, their point of view. To illustrate his point here, Carr selected as exemplars a number of well-regarded historians, among them being Theodore Mommsen.

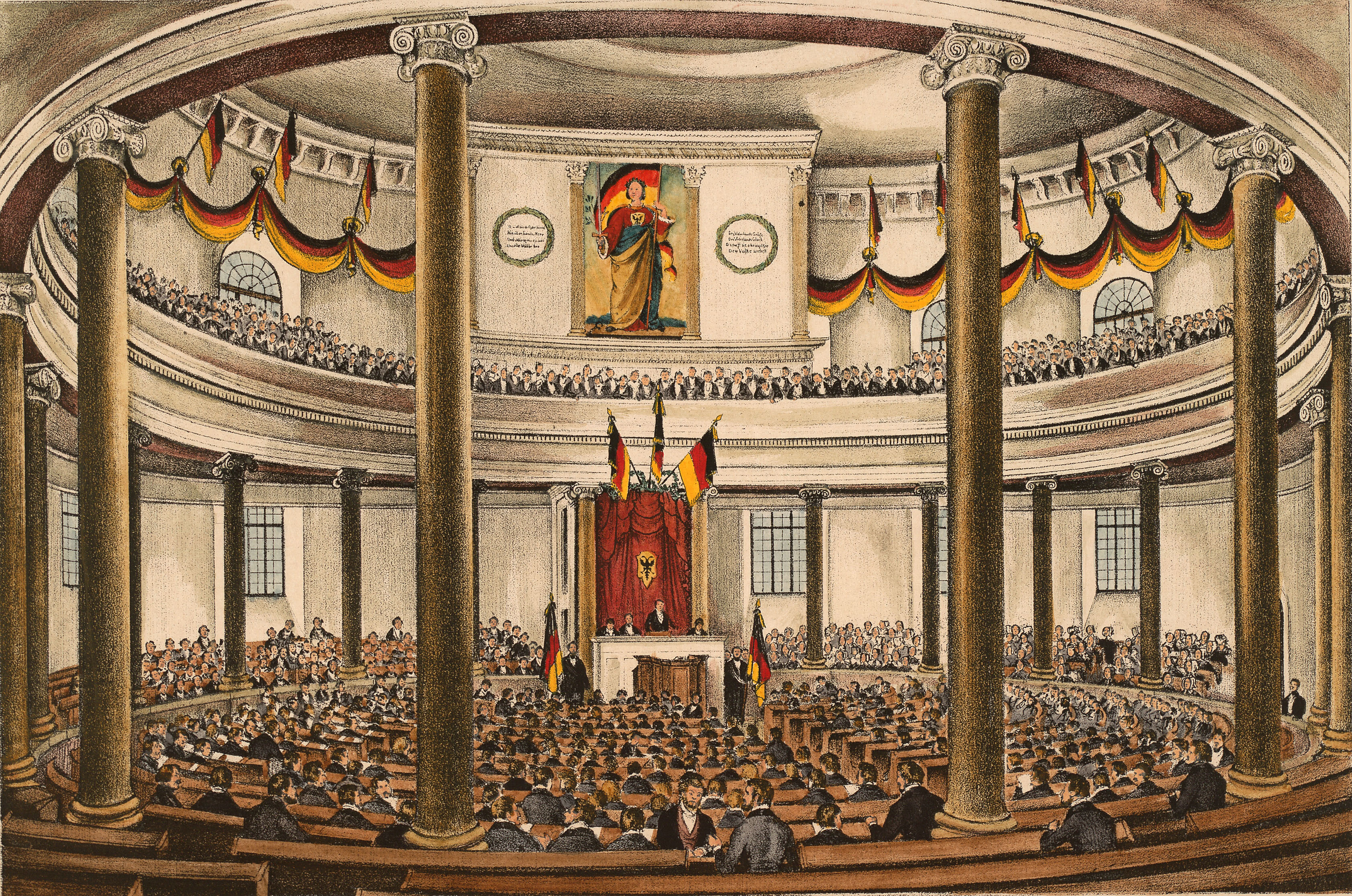
Democratically elected National Assembly at St. Paul's Church, Frankfurt, 18 May 1848

Accordingly, Carr informs us that Mommsen's multivolume work Römische Geschichte (Leipzig 1854–1856) may tell the perceptive modern historian much about mid-19th-century Germany, while it is presenting an account of ancient Rome. A major recent event in Germany was the failure of the 1848–1849 Revolution, while in Mommsen's Roman History his narration of the Republic draws to a close with the revolutionary emergence of a strong state executive in the figure of Julius Caesar. Carr conjectures as follows.

"Mommsen was imbued with the sense of need for a strong man to clean up the mess left by the failure of the German people to realize its political aspirations; and we shall never appreciate its history at its true value until we realize that his well-known idealization of Caesar is the product of this yearning for the strong man to save Germany from ruin, and that the lawyer-politician Cicero, that ineffective chatterbox and slippery procrastinator, has walked straight out of the debates of the Paulikirche in Frankfurt in 1848."

Far from protesting or denying such an observation, Mommsen himself readily admitted it. He added, "I wanted to bring down the ancient from their fantastic pedestal on which they appear in the real world. That is why the consul had to become the burgomaster. Perhaps I have overdone it; but my intention was sound enough."

Alongside Carr on Mommsen, Carr likewise approaches George Grote's History of Greece (1846–1856) and states that it must also reveal that period's England as well as ancient Greece. Thus about Grote's book Carr conjectures.

"Grote, an enlightened radical banker writing in the 1840s, embodied the aspirations of the rising and politically progressive British middle class in an idealized picture of Athenian democracy, in which Pericles figured as a Benthamite reformer, and Athens acquired an empire in a fit of absence of mind. It may not be fanciful to suggest that Grote's neglect of the problem of slavery in Athens reflected the failure of the group in which he belonged to face the problem of the new English factory working class.

"I should not think it an outrageous paradox", writes Carr, "if someone were to say that Grote's History of Greece has quite as much to tell us about the thought of the English philosophical radicals in the 1840s as about Athenian democracy in the fifth century B.C." Prof. Carr credits the philosopher R. G. Collingwood as being his inspiration for this line of thinking.

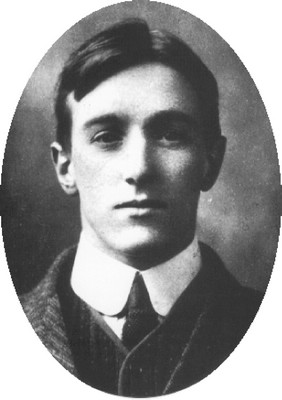
Collingwood

R. G. Collingwood, an early 20th-century Oxford professor, worked at building a philosophy of history, wherein history would remain a sovereign discipline. In pursuing this project he studied extensively the Italian philosopher and historian Benedetto Croce (1866–1952). Collingwood wrote on Croce, here in his 1921 essay.

"Croce shows how Herodotus, Livy, Tacitus, Grote, Mommsen, Thierry, and so forth, all wrote from a subjective point of view, wrote so that their personal ideals and feelings coloured their whole work and in parts falsified it. Now, if this is so, who wrote real history, history not coloured by points of view and ideals? Clearly no one. ... History, to be, must be seen, and must be seen by somebody, from somebody's point of view. ... But this is not an accusation against any particular school of historians; it is a law of our nature."

In summary, Edward Carr here presents his interesting developments regarding the theories proposed by Benedetto Croce and later taken up by R. G. Collingwood. In doing so Carr does not allege mistaken views or fault specific to Mommsen, or to any of the other historians he mentions. Rather any such errors and faults would be general to all history writing. As Collingwood states, "The only safe way of avoiding error is to give up looking for the truth." Nonetheless, this line of thought, and these examples and illustrations of how Mommsen's Germany might color his history of ancient Rome, are illuminating concerning both the process and the result.

=== Caesar ===
The figure of Julius Caesar (100–44) remains controversial among historians and students of ancient Rome. Mommsen saw in him a leader with a special gift for organizing and transforming the city-state, which had come to rule the Mediterranean world. Caesar was opposed by an oligarchy of aristocratic families, the optimates, who dominated the Senate and nearly monopolized state offices, who profited by the city's corruption and exploited the foreign conquests. They blocked the change necessitated by the times, stifling or coopting, at times by violence, any who advanced progressive programs. Although the state was dangerously unsteady, and the city often rent by armed mobs, the optimates rested on their heritage of the Roman tradition.

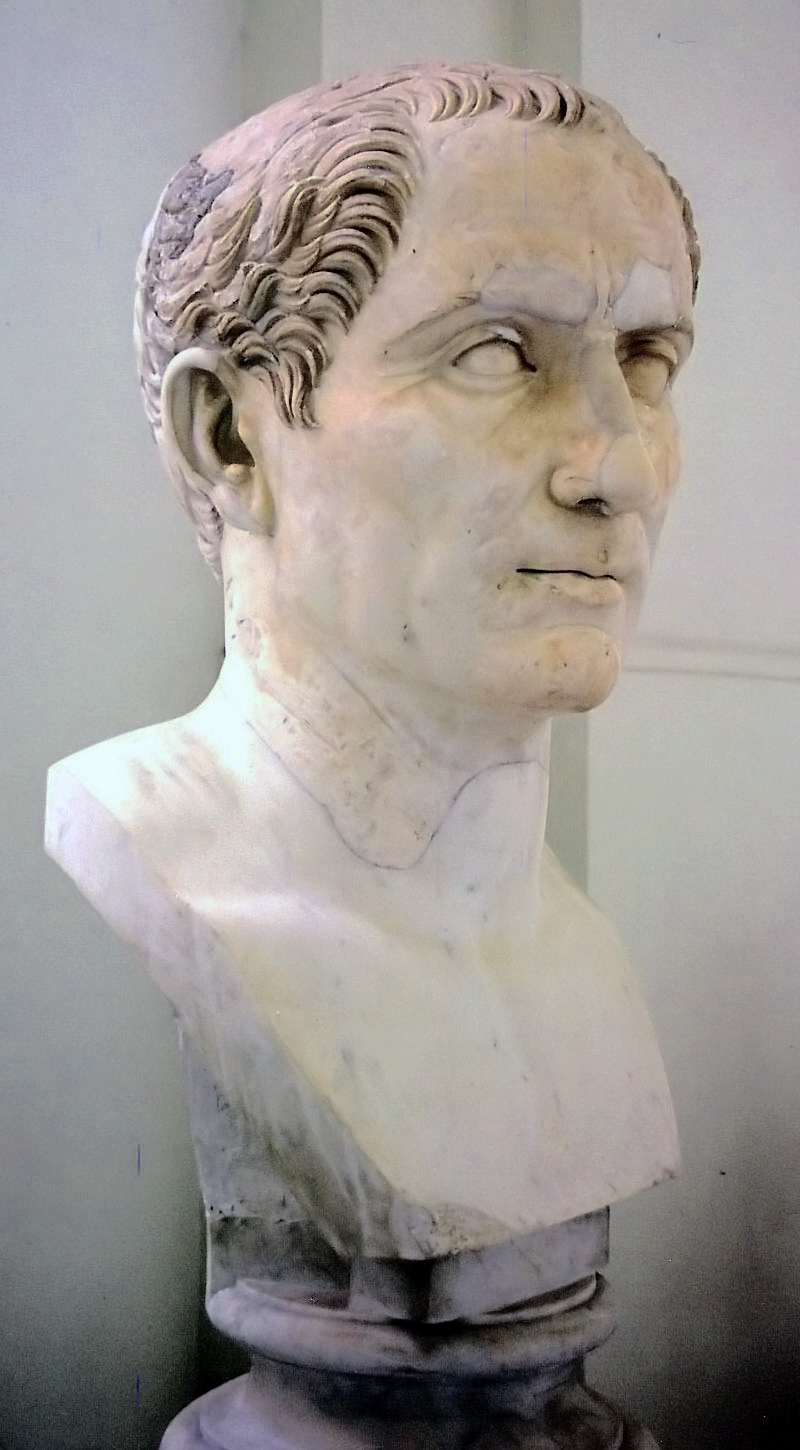
Julius Caesar, bust at the Museo Archeologico Nazionale di Napoli

Caesar sprang from the heart of this old nobility, yet he was born into a family which had already allied itself with the populares, i.e., those who favored constitutional change. Hence Caesar's career was associated with the struggle for a new order and, failing opportunity along peaceful avenues, he emerged as a military leader whose triumph at arms worked to advance political change. Yet both parties in this long struggle had checkered histories of violence and corruption. Mommsen, too, recognized and reported "Caesar the rake, Caesar the conspirator, and Caesar the groundbreaker for later centuries of absolutism."

Some moderns follow the optimate view that it was a nefarious role that Caesar played in the fall of the Republic, whose ruling array of institutions had not yet outlived their usefulness. To the contrary, the Republic's fall ushered in the oppressive Empire whose 'divine' rulers held absolute power. Julius Caesar as villain was an opinion shared, of course, by his knife-wielding assassins, most of whom were also nobility. Shared also without shame by that epitome of classical Roman politics and letters, Marcus Tullius Cicero (106–43). For some observers, following Caesar's assassination Cicero saved his rather erratic career in politics by his high-profile stand in favor of the Republic. Also strong among Caesar's opponents was Marcus Porcius Cato Uticensis (95–46), who had long led the opimates, supporters of the republican aristocracy, against the populares and in particular against Julius Caesar. During the Imperial era the stoic Cato became the symbol of lost republican virtue.

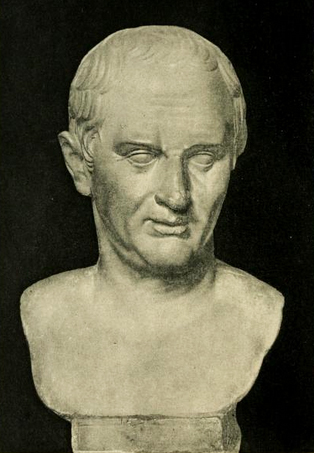
M. Tullius Cicero at about age 60

Nonetheless, even deadly foes could see the bright genius of Caesar; indeed, many conspirators were his beneficiaries. "Brutus, Cassius and the others who, like Cicero, attached themselves to the conspiracy acted less out of enmity to Caesar than out of a desire to destroy his dominatio." Too, the conspiracy failed to restore the Republic. An aristocrat's libertas meant very little to the population: the people, the armies, or even the equestrians; his assassins "failed to grasp the real pulse of the respublica."

Moderns may be able to see both sides of the issue, however, as an historian might. Indeed, there exists a great difference in context between, say, an American, and a German historian of the 1850s, where during 1848 citizens had made a rather spontaneous, incoherent effort to move German politics toward a free and unified country: it was crushed by the nobility.

The philosopher R. G. Collingwood (1889–1943) developed a nuanced view of history in which each person explores the past in order to create his or her own true understanding of that person's unique cultural inheritance. Although objectivity remains crucial to the process, each will naturally draw out their own inner truth from the universe of human truth. This fits the stark limitations on each individual's ability to know all sides of history. To a mitigated extent these constraints work also on the historian. Collingwood writes:

"This does not reduce history to something arbitrary or capricious. It remains genuine knowledge. How can this be, if my thoughts about Julius Caesar differ from Mommsen's? Must not one of us be wrong? No, because the object differs. My historical [object] is about my own past, not about Mommsen's past. Mommsen and I share in a great many things, and in many respects we share in a common past; but in so far as we are different people and representatives of different cultures and different generations we have different pasts. ... [O]ur views of Julius Caesar must differ, slightly perhaps, but perceptibly. This difference is not arbitrary, for I can see—or ought to be able to see—that in his place, apart (once more) from all questions of error, I should have come to his conclusions."

A modern historian of ancient Rome echoes the rough, current consensus of academics about this great and controversial figure, as he concludes his well-regarded biography of Julius Caesar: "When they killed him his assassins did not realise that they had eliminated the best and most far-sighted mind of their class."

== Commentary II ==
=== 4th volume ===
Mommsen mentioned the future publication of a fourth volume on the Roman Empire. Due to the immense popularity of his first three, there remained for decades substantial interest and expectation concerning the appearance of this fourth volume. Yet it did not appear in Mommsen's lifetime. Consequently, this missing fourth volume has caused numerous scholars to speculate about the reasons 'why not'. Concurrently, such musings served to suggest where Theodore Mommsen was to be situated amid the portrait gallery of historians of the 19th century and the modern era.

As to the matter of why "Mommsen failed to continue his history beyond the fall of the republic", Carr wrote: "During his active career, the problem of what happened once the strong man had taken over was not yet actual. Nothing inspired Mommsen to project this problem back on to the Roman scene; and the history of the empire remained unwritten."

=== Discernment ===
Because of Mommsen's expert knowledge across many field of study, he "knows as an eyewitness because... such a perfect comprehension [places him] in the position of a contemporary. [Thus he feels] a certainty he cannot explain, like the judgment of a statesman or a shrewd man of business who forms his opinions by processes he does not attempt to analyse."

While not following Niebuhr's 'divination', Mommsen's manner goes to question of whether one may use discrete and controlled 'intersticial projection', safeguarded by monitoring the results closely after the fact. Does its use necessarily sacrifice claims to 'objectivity'? Termed intuition based on scholarship, practitioners of such techniques are vulnerable to caustic challenges to the integrity of their science. Acknowledgement of such infirmities may also include an assessment of the skill involved and the quality of the result.

=== Praise ===
Mommsen's work continues to attract a refined and popular readership. In their introduction Saunders and Collins express their admiration for Mommsen and his contribution to the study of ancient Roman history:

"Theodor Mommsen (1817–1903) was the greatest classical historian of his century or of ours. His only rival in any century was Edward Gibbon, whose monumental History of the Decline and Fall of the Roman Empire complements rather than competes with Mommsen's superb description of the Roman republic."

One encyclopaedic reference summarizes: "Equally great as antiquary, jurist, political and social historian, Mommsen [had] no rivals. He combined the power of minute investigation with a singular faculty for bold generalization... ." About The History of Rome the universal historian Arnold J. Toynbee writes, "Mommsen wrote a great book, which certainly will always be reckoned among the masterpieces of Western historical literature." G. P. Gooch gives us these comments evaluating Mommsen's History: "Its sureness of touch, its many-sided knowledge, its throbbing vitality and the Venetian colouring of its portraits left an ineffaceable impression on every reader." "It was a work of genius and passion, the creation of a young man, and is as fresh and vital to-day as when it was written."

== 1902 Nobel Prize ==
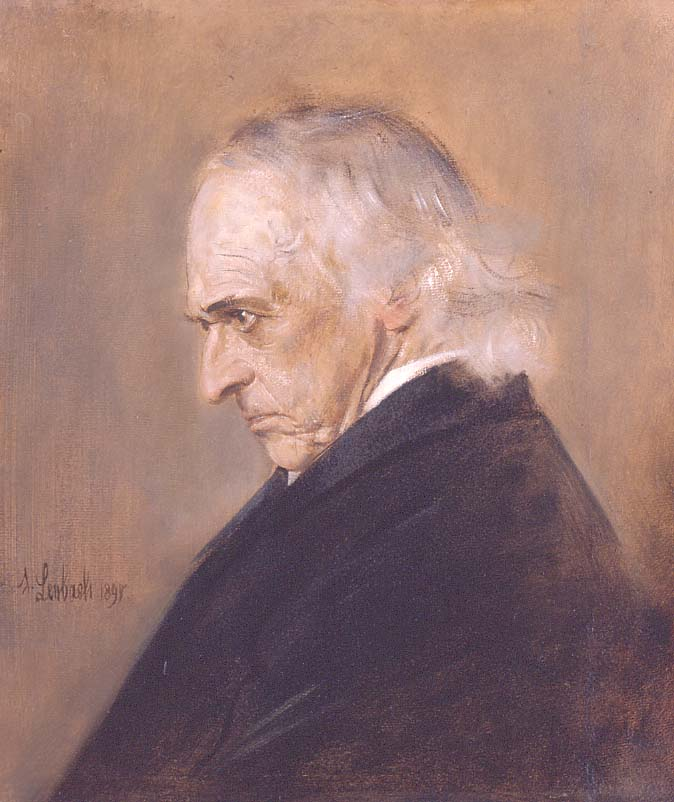
Theodor Mommsen, 1897 portrait by Franz von Lenbach

In 1902 Professor Theodor Mommsen became the second person to be awarded the Nobel Prize for Literature, which had been inaugurated the preceding year. This world recognition was given him with "special reference" to the Römische Geschichte. The commendation called him "the greatest living master of the art of historical writing."

The award came nearly fifty years after the first appearance of the work. The award also came during the last year of the author's life (1817–1903). It is the only time thus far that the Nobel Prize for Literature has been presented to a historian per se. Yet the literary Nobel has since been awarded to a philosopher (1950) with mention of an "intellectual history", and to a war-time leader (1953) for speeches and writings, including a "current events history", plus a Nobel Memorial Prize has been awarded for two "economic histories" (1993). Nonetheless Mommsen's multi-volume The History of Rome remains in a singular Nobel class.

The 1911 Encyclopædia Britannica, a well-regarded reference yet nonetheless "a source unsparingly critical", summarizes: "Equally great as antiquary, jurist, political and social historian, Mommsen lived to see the time when among students of Roman history he had pupils, followers, critics, but no rivals. He combined the power of minute investigation with a singular faculty for bold generalization and the capacity for tracing out the effects of thought on political and social life."

The British historian G. P. Gooch, writing in 1913, eleven years after Mommsen's Nobel prize, gives us this evaluation of his Römisches Geschichte: "Its sureness of touch, its many-sided knowledge, its throbbing vitality and the Venetian colouring of its portraits left an ineffaceable impression on every reader." "It was a work of genius and passion, the creation of a young man, and is as fresh and vital to-day as when it was written." About The History of Rome another British historian Arnold J. Toynbee in 1934 wrote, at the beginning of his own 12-volume universal history, "Mommsen wrote a great book, [Römisches Geschichte], which certainly will always be reckoned among the masterpieces of Western historical literature."

== See also ==
- Theodor Mommsen
- History of Rome
- Barthold Georg Niebuhr
- Decline and Fall of the Roman Empire
