= Dero A. Saunders =

American journalist

Dero Ames Saunders (1914–2002) was an American journalist and classical scholar.

He was born in Starkville, Mississippi. A graduate of Dartmouth College, he was executive editor of Forbes magazine from 1960–1981 and continued to edit a regular column until 1999.

As a reporter for Fortune magazine in 1957 he conducted the only known press interview with reclusive American businessman Daniel Ludwig.

With John H. Collins he compiled a noted translation of Theodor Mommsen's History of Rome. He is also known for his abridged version of Edward Gibbon's The History of the Decline and Fall of the Roman Empire.
