= John H. Collins (academic) =

American classical scholar (1902–1981)

- Born: November 14, 1902; Anaconda, Montana, U.S.
- Died: January 8, 1981 (aged 78)
- Occupation: Classical scholar

Academic background
- Education: University of Illinois; Cornell University; Goethe University Frankfurt

John H. Collins (November 14, 1902 – January 8, 1981) was an American classical scholar.

Born in Anaconda, Montana, he attended the University of Illinois and Cornell University, and in 1952 received his doctorate in classical history from Goethe University in Frankfurt-am-Main where he studied under Professor Matthias Gelzer, then a leading authority on Roman history, and prepared his doctoral dissertation on "Psychology and Propaganda in Caesar's Writings." He was a frequent contributor to Historia, The Classical Journal, and Gnomon, and achieved world recognition as an expert on Julius Caesar. In 1958 he edited with Dero A. Saunders a noted edition of Theodor Mommsen's History of Rome.

Fluent in six languages, Collins taught at the overseas division of the University of Maryland, the University of California, Berkeley, and Northern Illinois University at DeKalb where, in 1967, he received the NIU Excellence in Teaching award. In 1971, he received an Illinois mandatory retirement notice. Not ready to retire, he sought the aid of a former student, and protégé W.R.S., who was in a position to discuss the matter with then Illinois Governor Richard Ogilvie. Mr. S. explained to the Governor that such an eminent Professor as John H. Collins was too highly respected in both American and European intellectual circles to fall victim to the state's arbitrary mandatory retirement system. Moreover, such an arbitrary decision pursuant to these select intellectual circles would bode ill for the State of Illinois' university system. Subsequently, the decision was made to retain Collins on a different contract.

Upon Collins' retirement in 1978, a Northern Illinois University lecture hall was dedicated in his honor. He remained active in scholarly pursuits until his death in 1981.
