= William Collins =

William Collins may refer to:

== Arts ==
- William Collins (poet) (1721–1759), English poet
- William Collins (modeller), English modeller
- William Collins (painter) (1788–1847), English landscape artist
- William Lucas Collins (1815–1887), English author and clergyman of the Church of England
- William Wiehe Collins (1862–1951), English architectural and landscape genre painter
- Billy Collins (born 1941), American poet
- William P. Collins, author of works on the Bábí and Bahá'í faiths, see Bahá'í Faith in Europe

== Politics ==
- William Collins (Roundhead), English politician who sat in the House of Commons from 1654 to 1659
- William Collins (Warwick MP) (died 1859), member of parliament (MP) for Warwick 1837–52
- William Collins (South African politician) (1803–1876), member Volksraad of the Orange Free State
- William Richard Collins (1876–1944), South African politician
- William Collins (New York politician) (1818–1878), U.S. congressman from New York
- William Collins (New Zealand member of parliament) (1853–1923), New Zealand member of parliament for Christchurch in the South Island
- William Collins (English surgeon) (1859–1946), British surgeon and Liberal Party politician
- William Collins (New Zealand surgeon) (1853–1934) sportsman, surgeon, and member of the New Zealand Legislative Council
- William A. Collins (1935–2022), American politician, state representative and mayor from Norwalk, Connecticut
- William T. Collins (1886–1961), American politician, acting mayor of New York City

== Publishing ==
- William Collins (publisher) (1789–1853), Scottish founder of the William Collins, Sons publishing house
- William Collins (Lord Provost) (1817–1895), Scottish temperance movement activist; son of publisher William Collins.
- William Collins, Sons (est. 1819), Scottish publishing house, became part of HarperCollins in 1990, a subsidiary of News Corp.
- William Collins (imprint), a non-fiction publishing brand launched by HarperCollins in 2014

== Sports ==
- William Collins (cricketer, born 1837) (1837–1876), Australian cricketer
- William Collins (cricketer, born 1848) (1848–1932), Welsh author and cricketer
- William Collins (cricketer, born 1868) (1868–1942), English cricketer
- William Collins (tennis), British tennis player from the 1920s and 30s, see 1930 Wimbledon Championships – Men's singles
- William Collins (canoeist) (1932–1993), Canadian canoer who competed in the 1956 Summer Olympics
- Bill Collins (sprinter) (William Collins, born 1950), American sprinter
- Bill Collins (American football) (William Newton Collins, 1894–?), American college football player and coach
- Bill Collins (catcher) (William J. Collins, 1863–1893), Irish-American baseball player
- Bill Collins (footballer, born 1871) (William Collins, 1871–1942), Australian footballer for Carlton
- Bill Collins (footballer, born 1920) (William Hanna Collins, 1920–2010), aka Buster Collins, Northern Irish footballer
- Bill Collins (golfer) (William R. Collins, 1928–2006), American professional golfer
- Bill Collins (ice hockey) (William Earl Collins, born 1943), Canadian former ice hockey player
- Bill Collins (outfielder) (William Shirley Collins, 1882–1961), American baseball player
- Bill Collins (racecaller) (William Henry Collins, 1928–1997), Australian racecaller
- Bill Collins (rugby union) (William Reuben Collins, 1911–1993), New Zealand rugby union player
- Bill Collins (television presenter) (William Roderick Collins, 1934–2019), Australian film critic and television presenter
- Billy Collins Jr. (1961–1984), American professional boxer
- Billy Collins (Australian footballer) (William Henry Collins, 1909–1982), Australian rules footballer

== Others ==
- William Collins (colonist) (1760-1819), English naval officer and early settler in Tasmania, Australia
- William O. Collins (1809–1880), commandant of Fort Laramie, Wyoming; namesake of Fort Collins, Colorado and Camp Collins
- William Collins (bishop) (1867–1911), Bishop of Gibraltar in the Church of England
- William Henry Collins (1878–1937), Canadian geologist
- William Floyd Collins (1887–1925), American cave explorer
- William J. Collins (1896–1970), president of St. Ambrose University
- William R. Collins (1913–1991), United States Marine Corps general
- William T. Collins Jr. (1932–2023), American automotive engineer for Pontiac and DeLorean
- William Erle Collins (1929–2013), American parasitologist
- Bootsy Collins (William Earl Collins, born 1951), American funk bassist, singer and songwriter
- Mr William Collins, a fictional character in the Jane Austen novel Pride and Prejudice
- William Collins, a contestant of Big Brother 1 (American season)
- William D. Collins, climate scientist and astrophysicist

== See also ==
- Bill Collins (disambiguation)
- Wil Collins, American golfer
