= Bill Collins =

Bill or Billy Collins may refer to:

- Bill Collins (American football) (1894–?), American college football player and coach
- Bill Collins (automotive engineer) (1932-2023), American automotive engineer
- Bill Collins (sprinter) (born 1950), American athlete
- Bill Collins (baker) (1931–2021), co-inventor of the Chorleywood process
- Bill Collins (catcher) (1863–1893), Irish-American baseball player
- Bill Collins (footballer, born 1871) (1871–1942), Australian footballer for Carlton
- Bill Collins (footballer, born 1920) (1920–2010), aka Buster Collins, Northern Irish footballer
- Bill Collins (footballer, born 1933) (1933–2004), Australian footballer for Hawthorn
- Bill Collins (golfer) (1928–2006), American professional golfer
- Bill Collins (ice hockey) (born 1943), Canadian former ice hockey player
- Bill Collins (outfielder) (1882–1961), American baseball player
- Bill Collins (racecaller) (1928–1997), Australian racecaller and television presenter
- Bill Collins (rugby union) (1911–1993), New Zealand rugby union player
- Bill Collins (television presenter) (1934–2019), Australian film critic and television presenter
- Billy Collins (Australian footballer) (1909–1987), Australian footballer for Melbourne
- Billy Collins (born 1941), American poet
- Billy Collins Jr. (1961–1984), American professional boxer

== See also ==
- William Collins (disambiguation)
- Billy Collings (born 1940), Scottish footballer
