= Wakkerstroom (House of Assembly of South Africa constituency) =

- Former constituency for the South African House of Assembly
- Province: Transvaal
- Electorate: 9,925 (1972 by)

Former constituency
- Created: 1910
- Abolished: 1974
- Number of members: 1
- Last MHA: W. L. Weber (NP)
- Replaced by: Ermelo

Wakkerstroom was a constituency in the Transvaal Province of South Africa, which existed from 1910 to 1974. It covered a rural area in the eastern Transvaal, centred on the town of Wakkerstroom. Throughout its existence it elected one member to the House of Assembly and one to the Transvaal Provincial Council.

== Franchise notes ==
When the Union of South Africa was formed in 1910, the electoral qualifications in use in each pre-existing colony were kept in place. In the Transvaal Colony, and its predecessor the South African Republic, the vote was restricted to white men, and as such, elections in the Transvaal Province were held on a whites-only franchise from the beginning. The franchise was also restricted by property and education qualifications until the 1933 general election, following the passage of the Women's Enfranchisement Act, 1930 and the Franchise Laws Amendment Act, 1931. From then on, the franchise was given to all white citizens aged 21 or over. Non-whites remained disenfranchised until the end of apartheid and the introduction of universal suffrage in 1994.

== History ==
Like most of the rural Transvaal, Wakkerstroom was a conservative seat and had a largely Afrikaans-speaking electorate. It was first taken by the National Party in 1924, and when the NP merged into the United Party in 1934, Wakkerstroom's MP Pieter van der Merwe Martins joined neither the UP nor the dissident Purified National Party. He instead stood for re-election in 1938 as an independent, and lost out to the United Party's William Richard Collins, former MP for Ermelo. Collins died in 1944, and the resulting by-election saw the seat fall to the Herenigde Nasionale Party, four years ahead of the party's nationwide election victory in 1948.

== Members ==
Election	Member	Party
1910	J. A. Joubert	Het Volk
1913 by	N. J. de Wet	South African
1915	G. A. Kolbe	South African
1920	James van der Merwe	South African
1921	James van der Merwe	South African
1924	A. S. Naudé	National
1929	A. S. Naudé	National
1933	P. v. d. M. Martins	National
1934	P. v. d. M. Martins	Independent
1938	W. R. Collins	United
1943	W. R. Collins	United
1944 by	J. G. W. van Niekerk	HNP
1948	J. G. W. van Niekerk	HNP
1952 by	H. E. Martins	National
1953	H. E. Martins	National
1958	H. E. Martins	National
1961	H. E. Martins	National
1966	H. E. Martins	National
1970	H. E. Martins	National
1972 by	W. L. Weber	National
1974	Constituency abolished	

== Detailed results ==
=== Elections in the 1910s ===
General election 1910: Wakkerstroom
Party	Candidate	Votes	%	±%
Het Volk	J. A. Joubert	Unopposed		
Het Volk win (new seat)				

Wakkerstroom by-election, 1 November 1913
Party	Candidate	Votes	%	±%
South African	Nicolaas Jacobus de Wet	Unopposed		
South African win (new seat)				

General election 1915: Wakkerstroom
Party	Candidate	Votes	%	±%
South African	G. A. Kolbe	1,311	64.0	N/A
National	A. Kuit	739	36.0	New
Majority		572	28.0	N/A
Turnout		2,050	78.1	N/A
South African hold		Swing	N/A	

=== Elections in the 1920s ===
General election 1920: Wakkerstroom
Party	Candidate	Votes	%	±%
South African	James van der Merwe	1,247	54.2	−9.8
National	A. Kuit	1,053	45.8	+9.8
Majority		194	8.4	−19.6
Turnout		2,300	73.5	−4.6
South African hold		Swing	-9.8	

General election 1921: Wakkerstroom
Party	Candidate	Votes	%	±%
South African	James van der Merwe	1,327	50.9	−3.3
National	A. Kuit	1,276	49.1	+3.3
Majority		51	1.8	−6.6
Turnout		2,603	76.6	+3.1
South African hold		Swing	-3.3	

General election 1924: Wakkerstroom
Party	Candidate	Votes	%	±%
National	A. S. Naudé	1,235	53.9	+4.8
South African	A. G. Robertson	1,045	45.6	−5.3
Rejected ballots		11	0.5	N/A
Majority		190	8.3	N/A
Turnout		2,291	85.6	+9.0
National gain from South African		Swing	+5.1	

General election 1929: Wakkerstroom
Party	Candidate	Votes	%	±%
National	A. S. Naudé	1,207	54.5	+0.6
South African	B. J. de K. Boshoff	999	45.1	−0.5
Rejected ballots		8	0.4	-0.1
Majority		208	9.4	+1.1
Turnout		2,214	86.9	+1.3
National hold		Swing	+0.6	

=== Elections in the 1930s ===
General election 1933: Wakkerstroom
Party	Candidate	Votes	%	±%
National	P. v. d. M. Martins	Unopposed		
National hold				

General election 1938: Wakkerstroom
Party	Candidate	Votes	%	±%
United	William Richard Collins	2,687	54.1	New
Independent	P. v.d. M. Martins	2,225	44.8	N/A
Rejected ballots		56	1.1	N/A
Majority		462	9.3	N/A
Turnout		4,968	87.3	N/A
United gain from Independent		Swing	N/A	
