= Ancient Classics for English Readers =

Book series

The Ancient Classics for English Readers series was a collection of 28 volumes of classics of ancient Greek and Latin literature, translated into English with paraphrases and commentaries by leading classical scholars. The series was published from 1870 in Edinburgh and London by William Blackwood and Sons. From 1870 J. B. Lippincott & Co. republished the series in Philadelphia. The founding editor was W. Lucas Collins.

== Volumes in the series ==
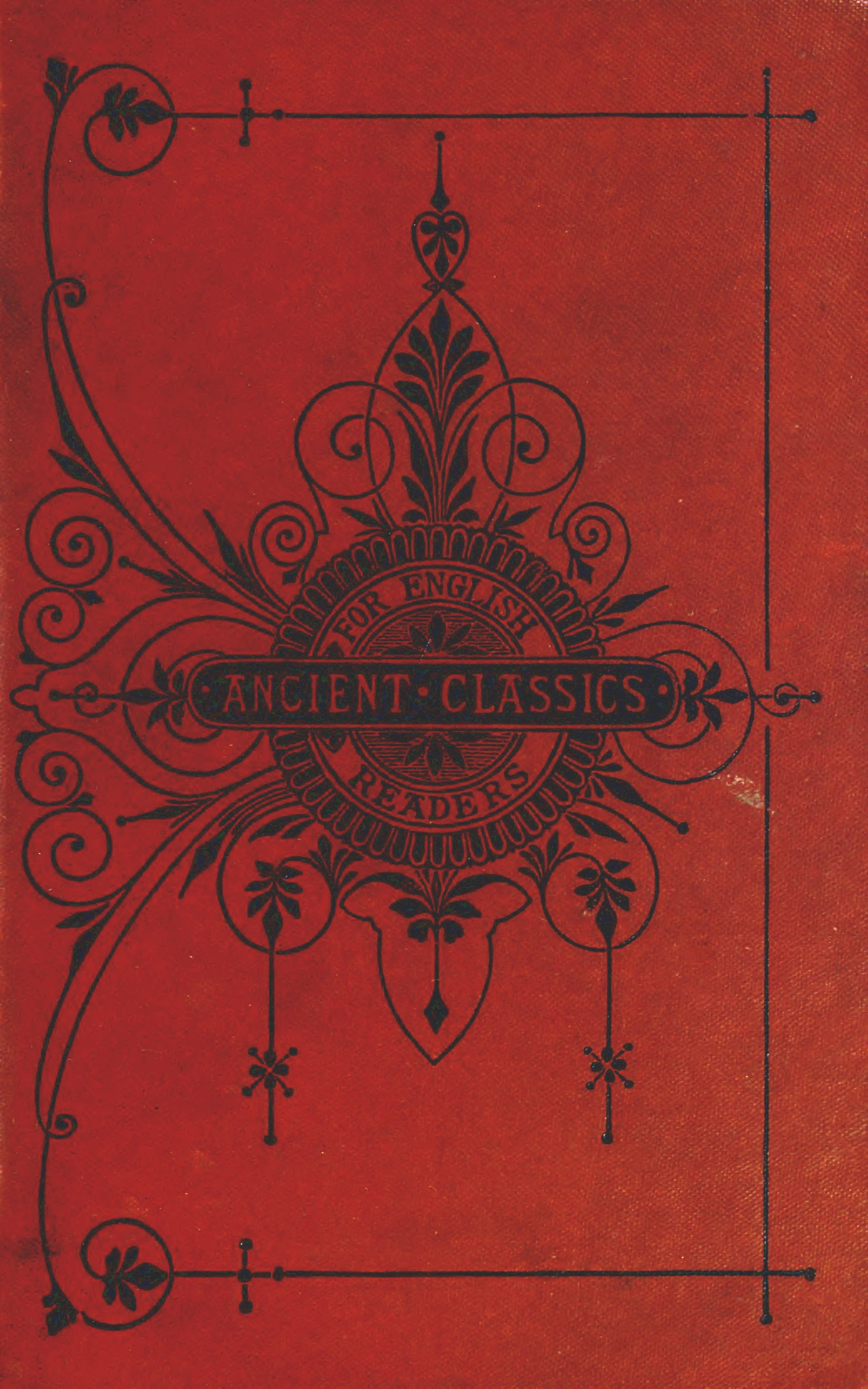

- Homer: The Iliad, 1870, By W. Lucas Collins, M.A.
- Homer: The Odyssey, 1870, By W. Lucas Collins, M.A.
- Herodotus, 1870, By George C. Swayne, M.A.
- The commentaries of Cæsar, 1870, By Anthony Trollope.
- Virgil, 1870, By W. Lucas Collins, M.A.
- Horace, 1870, By Theodore Martin.
- Æschylus, 1871, By the Right Rev. Reginald Copleston, the Bishop of Colombo.
- Xenophon, 1871, By Sir Alexander Grant, 10th Baronet, LL.D.
- Cicero, 1871, By W. Lucas Collins, M.A.
- Sophocles, 1871, By Clifton W. Collins, M.A.
- Pliny's letters, 1872, By Alfred John Church, M.A., and William Jackson Brodribb, M.A.
- Euripides, 1872, By William Bodham Donne.
- Juvenal, 1872, By Edward Walford, M.A.
- Aristophanes, 1872, By W. Lucas Collins, M.A.
- Hesiod and Theognis, 1873, By the Rev. James Davies, M.A.
- Plautus and Terence, 1873, By W. Lucas Collins, M.A.
- Tacitus, 1873, By William Bodham Donne.
- Lucian, 1873, By W. Lucas Collins, M.A.
- Plato, 1874, By Clifton W. Collins.
- The Greek Anthology, 1874, By Charles Neaves, Lord Neaves.
- Livy, 1876, By W. Lucas Collins, M.A.
- Ovid, 1876, By the Rev. Alfred John Church, M.A
- Catullus, Tibullus, and Propertius, 1876, By the Rev. James Davies, M.A.
- Demosthenes, 1877, By the Rev. W. J. Brodribb, M.A.
- Aristotle, 1877, By Sir Alexander Grant, 10th Baronet, LL.D.
- Thucydides, 1878, By W. Lucas Collins, M.A.
- Lucretius, 1878, By William Hurrell Mallock, M.A.
- Pindar, 1879, By the Rev. Francis David Morice, M.A.
