= Ermelo (House of Assembly of South Africa constituency) =

- Former constituency for the South African House of Assembly
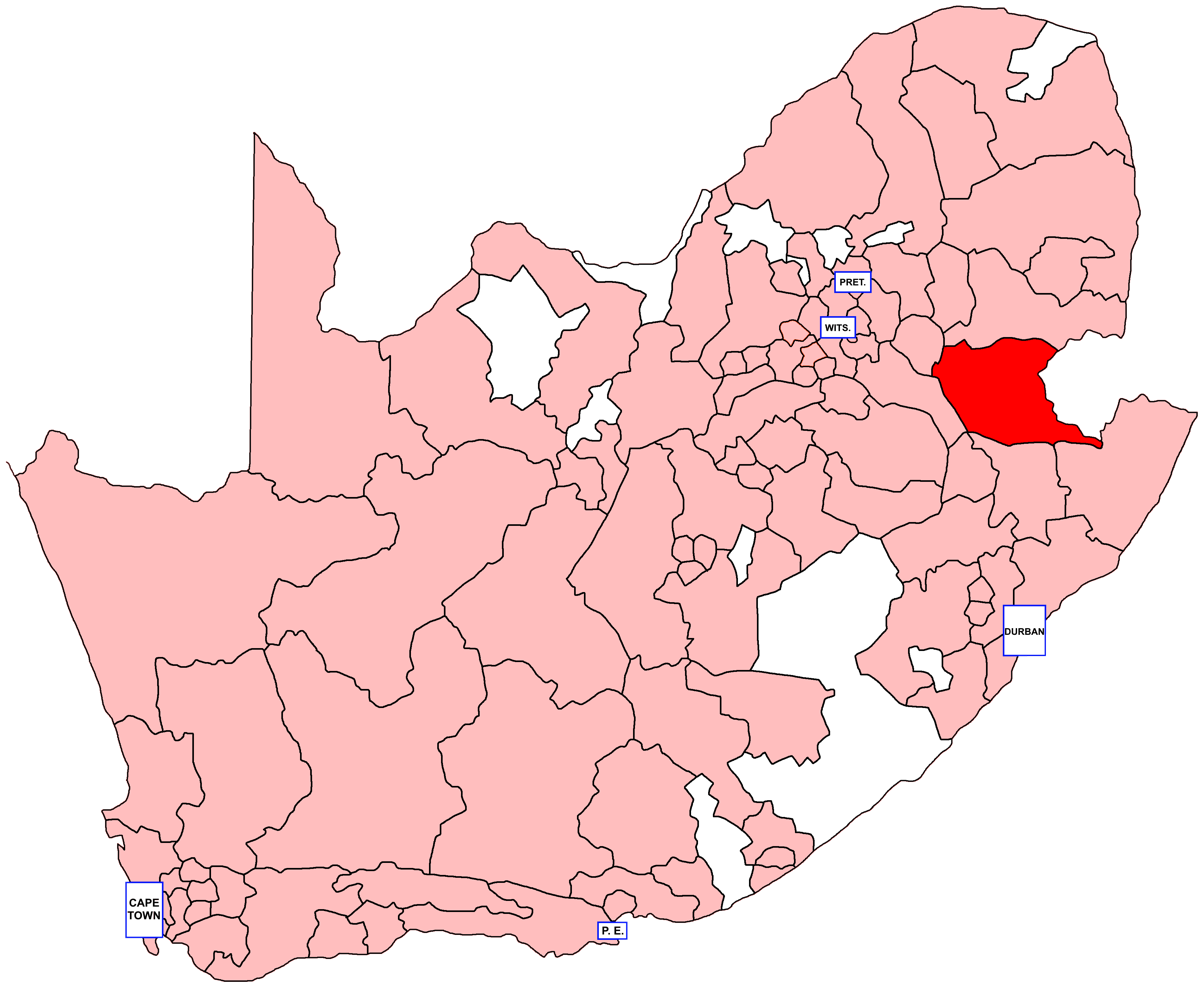
- Location of Ermelo within South Africa (1981)
- Province: Transvaal
- Electorate: 18,445 (1989)

Former constituency
- Created: 1910
- Abolished: 1994
- Number of members: 1
- Last MHA: M. J. Mentz (CP)
- Replaced by: Mpumalanga

Ermelo was a constituency in the Transvaal Province of South Africa, which existed from 1910 to 1994. Named after the town of Ermelo, it covered a rural area in the eastern Transvaal, bordering Natal as well as Eswatini. Throughout its existence it elected one member to the House of Assembly and one to the Transvaal Provincial Council.

== Franchise notes ==
When the Union of South Africa was formed in 1910, the electoral qualifications in use in each pre-existing colony were kept in place. In the Transvaal Colony, and its predecessor the South African Republic, the vote was restricted to white men, and as such, elections in the Transvaal Province were held on a whites-only franchise from the beginning. The franchise was also restricted by property and education qualifications until the 1933 general election, following the passage of the Women's Enfranchisement Act, 1930 and the Franchise Laws Amendment Act, 1931. From then on, the franchise was given to all white citizens aged 21 or over. Non-whites remained disenfranchised until the end of apartheid and the introduction of universal suffrage in 1994.

== History ==
Like most of the rural Transvaal, Ermelo had a largely Afrikaans-speaking electorate. It only changed hands twice in its 84-year history: in 1948, when the Herenigde Nasionale Party captured it as part of its nationwide sweep of rural constituencies, and in 1987, when the incumbent Nationalist MP was defeated by a candidate of the hardline pro-apartheid Conservative Party. However, there was a minor exception in the form of Albert Hertzog, the seat's long-serving Nationalist MP, cabinet minister and leader of the National Party's verkramp (conservative) faction, who left the party in 1969 and formed the Herstigte Nasionale Party. He continued to sit as an HNP MP for about six months, and was soundly defeated for re-election by the official NP candidate.

== Members ==
Election	Member	Party
1910	Tobias Smuts	Het Volk
1915	Tobias Smuts	South African
1916 by	William Richard Collins	South African
1920	William Richard Collins	South African
1921	William Richard Collins	South African
1924	William Richard Collins	South African
1929	William Richard Collins	South African
1933	William Richard Collins	South African
1934	William Richard Collins	United
1938	David Jackson	United
1943	David Jackson	United
1948	Albert Hertzog	HNP
1953	Albert Hertzog	National
1958	Albert Hertzog	National
1961	Albert Hertzog	National
1966	Albert Hertzog	National
1969	Albert Hertzog	HNP
1970	G. F. Botha	National
1974	G. F. Botha	National
1977	H. J. Tempel	National
1981	H. J. Tempel	National
1987	M. J. Mentz	Conservative
1989	M. J. Mentz	Conservative
1994	Constituency abolished	

== Detailed results ==
=== Elections in the 1910s ===
General election 1910: Ermelo
Party	Candidate	Votes	%	±%
Het Volk	Tobias Smuts	Unopposed		
Het Volk win (new seat)				

General election 1915: Ermelo
Party	Candidate	Votes	%	±%
South African	Tobias Smuts	1,295	65.1	N/A
National	W. P. Steenkamp	695	34.9	New
Majority		600	30.2	N/A
Turnout		1,990	81.4	N/A
South African hold		Swing	N/A	

=== Ermelo ===
Ermelo by-election, 2 November 1916
Party	Candidate	Votes	%	±%
South African	William Richard Collins	1,147	63.9	−1.2
National	J. R. Buhrmann	649	36.1	+1.2
Majority		600	27.8	−2.4
Turnout		1,796	73.5	−7.9
South African hold		Swing	-1.2	

=== Elections in the 1920s ===
General election 1920: Ermelo
Party	Candidate	Votes	%	±%
South African	William Richard Collins	1,334	61.6	−3.5
National	P. H. Nel	833	38.4	+3.5
Majority		501	23.2	−7.0
Turnout		2,167	73.0	−8.4
South African hold		Swing	-3.5	

General election 1921: Ermelo
Party	Candidate	Votes	%	±%
South African	William Richard Collins	1,367	60.6	−1.0
National	W. A. Joubert	889	39.4	+1.0
Majority		478	23.2	−2.0
Turnout		2,256	73.8	+0.8
South African hold		Swing	-1.0	

General election 1924: Ermelo
Party	Candidate	Votes	%	±%
South African	William Richard Collins	1,335	52.9	−7.7
National	S. P. Bekker	1,178	46.7	+7.3
Rejected ballots		11	0.4	N/A
Majority		478	6.2	−17.0
Turnout		2,524	82.5	+8.7
South African hold		Swing	-8.5	

General election 1929: Ermelo
Party	Candidate	Votes	%	±%
South African	William Richard Collins	1,328	53.1	+0.2
National	S. P. Bekker	1,164	46.5	−0.2
Rejected ballots		11	0.4	+-0
Majority		164	6.6	+0.4
Turnout		2,503	92.0	+9.5
South African hold		Swing	+0.2	

=== Elections in the 1930s ===
General election 1933: Ermelo
Party	Candidate	Votes	%	±%
South African	William Richard Collins	Unopposed		
South African hold				

General election 1938: Ermelo
Party	Candidate	Votes	%	±%
United	David Jackson	2,701	59.2	N/A
Independent	J. J. Smit	1,842	40.4	New
Rejected ballots		21	0.4	N/A
Majority		859	18.8	N/A
Turnout		4,564	84.6	N/A
United hold		Swing	N/A	
