= William D. Collins =

American climate scientist and astrophysicist

- Occupations: Climate scientist and astrophysicist

Academic background
- Education: Princeton University; University of Chicago

Academic work
- Institutions: University of East Anglia

William D. Collins is an American climate scientist and astrophysicist. He is the director of ClimateUEA and a professor of AI for Climate Science at the University of East Anglia.

Collins' research has focused on climate science, Earth system modeling, atmospheric physics, machine learning for climate prediction, radiative forcing, and climate change. He is a fellow of the American Association for the Advancement of Science (AAAS), the American Physical Society (APS), the American Geophysical Union (AGU), and the American Meteorological Society (AMS).

== Education ==
Collins received a B.A. in physics from Princeton University in 1981. From the University of Chicago, he received an M.S. and a Ph.D. in astronomy and astrophysics in 1984 and 1988, respectively.

== Career ==
Collins began his career as a post-graduate research associate at the University of Chicago from 1988 to 1990. Later, he joined the Scripps Institution of Oceanography in the same role from 1990 to 1992. Subsequently, he became an assistant research physicist at Scripps and also worked as a lecturer there in 1994. In 1996, he joined the National Center for Atmospheric Research (NCAR) and worked there until 2008.

In 2007, Collins joined Lawrence Berkeley National Laboratory as a senior scientist. Subsequently, he held leadership positions there, including department head from 2007 to 2015, division director from 2015 to 2022, and associate laboratory director from 2022 to 2026. He was also a professor in residence at the University of California, Berkeley, from 2007 to 2026, where he also held the position of James and Katherine Lau Chair from 2018 to 2020. He was director of the university's Climate Readiness Institute from 2013 to 2018 and of its Environmental Resilience Accelerator from 2018 to 2020. Since 2026, he has been the director of ClimateUEA and a professor of AI for Climate Science at the University of East Anglia.

Alongside these appointments, Collins has also worked as a lead and coordinating lead author of the Sixth Assessment Report of the Intergovernmental Panel on Climate Change (IPCC), a lead author of the Fifth Assessment Report, and a lead and contributing author of the Fourth Assessment Report, which formed part of the IPCC's work recognized by the 2007 Nobel Peace Prize. He was an editor of the Journal of Climate and co-editor-in-chief of the International Journal of Climatology. He is also an executive editorial board member of Machine Learning: Earth.

== Research ==
Collins' research has focused on climate science, Earth system modeling, physical climate processes, and the use of artificial intelligence to enhance climate prediction and decision-making. His research has focused on aerosol radiative effects and radiative transfer models, radiative forcing, greenhouse gases, and the Rapid Radiation Transfer Model Global (RRTMG) for shortwave and longwave radiation. He described the overlapping methodology used in the radiation parameterization and the effects of cloud overlap on radiative heating rates, atmospheric temperature, and hydrological processes. He described the Community Atmosphere Model (CAM) as the atmospheric component of the Community Climate System Model (CCSM). He also employed the Community Earth System Model (CESM) to disentangle the biogeophysical and biogeochemical effects of climate change and developed CESM 1.2.2, comprising atmosphere, land, ocean, sea ice, and river systems.

Collins' studies have further introduced vertically resolved soil biochemistry schemes and evaluated the transient climate response. He assessed the ability of climate models to simulate climate using Coupled Model Intercomparison Project (CMIP) historical simulations, including the representation of temperature extremes. He examined solar absorption in the tropical climate system. He also emphasized that humans are changing the climate with uncertain consequences and highlighted links between global warming and extreme weather, as well as planning for climate change.

Collins discussed hybrid modeling frameworks that integrate machine learning with classical process-based models. He explored the potential of machine learning based climate model emulators, and used a Convolutional Neural Network (CNN) architecture to identify extreme weather conditions. Moreover, he presented a deep learning based methodology for climate extreme event detection by classifying tropical cyclones, weather fronts, and atmospheric rivers.

== Awards and honors ==
- 2014 – Fellow, AAAS
- 2017 – Fellow, APS
- 2019 – John Tyndall History of Global Environmental Change Lecture, AGU
- 2020 – Fellow, AGU
- 2021 – Five Sigma Physicist Honor, APS
- 2022 – Robert Hofstadter Memorial Lecture, Stanford University
- 2024 – Jule Gregory Charney Lecture, AGU
- Fellow, AMS

== Selected articles ==
- Ramanathan, V.; Crutzen, P. J.; Lelieveld, J.; Mitra, A. P.; Althausen, D.; et al. (2001). "Indian Ocean Experiment: An Integrated Analysis of the Climate Forcing and Effects of the Great Indo-Asian Haze". Journal of Geophysical Research: Atmospheres. 106 (D22): 28371–28398. Bibcode:2001JGR...10628371R. doi:10.1029/2001JD900133.
- Collins, William D.; Bitz, Cecilia M.; Blackmon, Maurice L.; Bonan, Gordon B.; Bretherton, Christopher S.; et al. (2006). "The Community Climate System Model Version 3 (CCSM3)". Journal of Climate. 19 (11): 2122–2143. Bibcode:2006JCli...19.2122C. doi:10.1175/JCLI3761.1.
- Iacono, Michael J.; Delamere, Jennifer S.; Mlawer, Eli J.; Shephard, Mark W.; Clough, Shepard A.; Collins, William D. (2008). "Radiative Forcing by Long-Lived Greenhouse Gases: Calculations with the AER Radiative Transfer Models". Journal of Geophysical Research: Atmospheres. 113 (D13) 2008JD009944. Bibcode:2008JGRD..11313103I. doi:10.1029/2008JD009944.
- Hurrell, James W.; Holland, M. M.; Gent, P. R.; Ghan, S.; Collins, W. D.; et al. (2013). "The Community Earth System Model: A Framework for Collaborative Research". Bulletin of the American Meteorological Society. 94 (9): 1339–1360. Bibcode:2013BAMS...94.1339H. doi:10.1175/BAMS-D-12-00121.1.
- Flato, G.; Marotzke, J.; Abiodun, B.; Braconnot, P.; Chou, S.; Collins, W.; et al. (2014). "Evaluation of Climate Models". Climate Change 2013: The Physical Science Basis: 741–866. doi:10.1017/CBO9781107415324.020. ISBN 978-1-107-05799-9.
