= Tobias Smuts =

Boer General

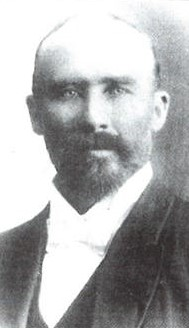
- Boer War General Tobias Smuts

Personal details
- Born: 25 November 1861 Ermelo, South Africa or Krugerspost, district Lydenburg
- Died: 10 August 1916 (aged 54) Elandsfontein, Alberton, South Africa
- Occupation: Representative for Ermelo in the Eerste Volksraad 1896, assistant commandant general, combat general

Military service
- Allegiance: South African Republic
- Battles/wars: Magato War; Second Boer War (1899-1902): many battles including the Battle of Colenso (15 December 1900), Battle of Spion Kop (23–24 January 1900) up to the Battle of Donkerhoek (Diamond Hill, 11 – 12 June 1900); commands: Ermelo Commando, but also Carolina, Standerton, Swaziland and Wakkerstroom Commandos

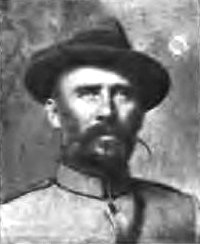
Tobias Smuts

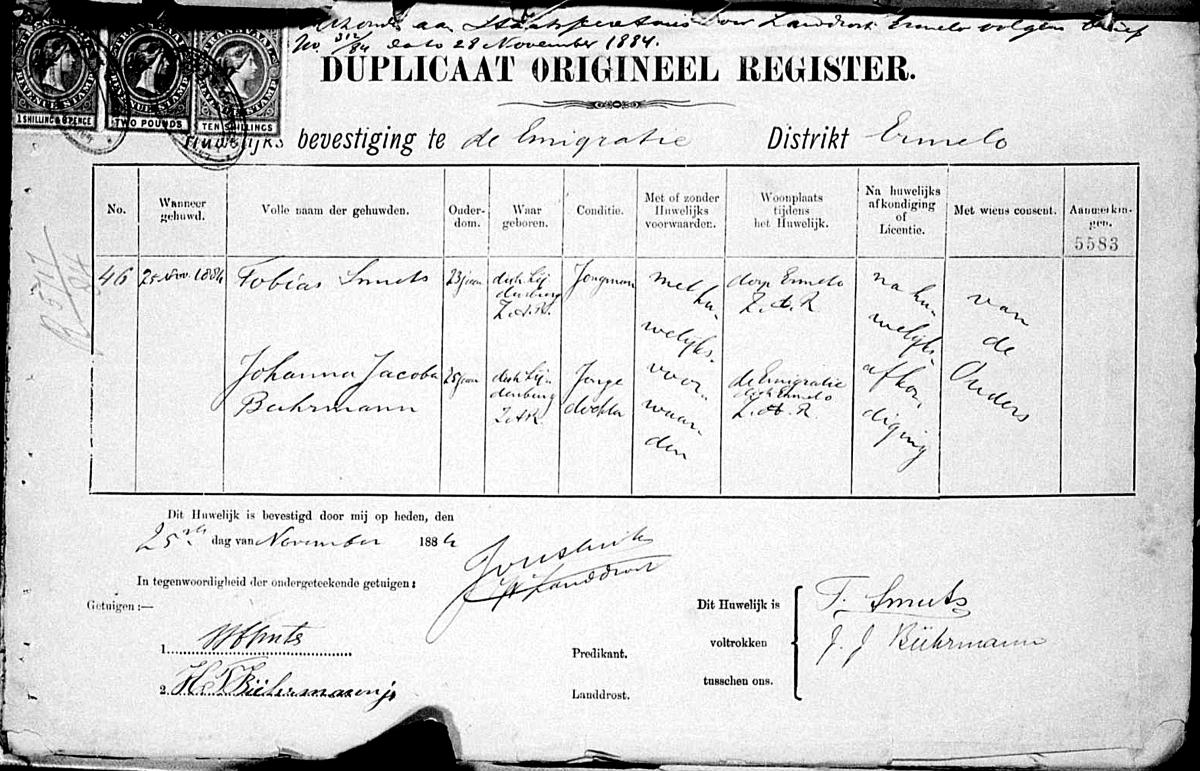
Marriage certificate of Tobias Smuts (1861–1916) and Johanna Jacoba Bührmann (1859–1946), Ermelo, South Africa, 1884.

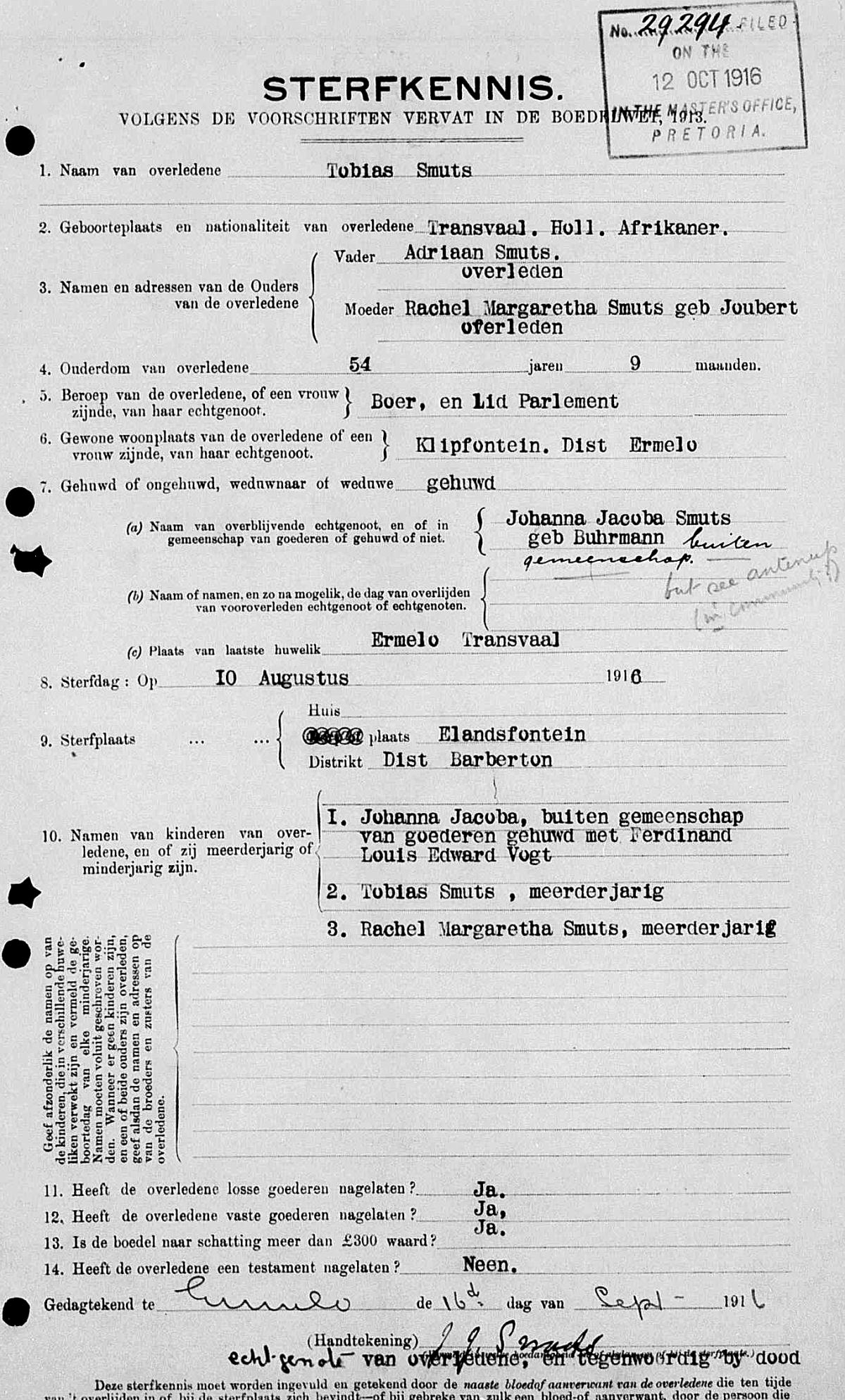
Death certificate for Tobias Smuts (1861–1916), Ermelo, South Africa, 1916

Tobias Smuts (nickname Toop, November 25, 1861 – August 10, 1916) was a Second Boer War Boer general and member of the Eerste Volksraad for the South African Republic.

== Family ==
Tobias Smuts was born in 1861 the fourth son of Adriaan Smuts (Paardenberg, Agter-Paarl, Paarl, Cape Colony, 6 October 1822 – Klipbank, Ermelo, Transvaal, 7 June 1911) and Rachel Margaretha Joubert (Graaff-Reinet, Cape Colony, 29 January 1831 – Ermelo, Transvaal, 4 March 1886) among in total six sons and seven daughters. A young namesake brother Tobias Smuts had died as a baby in 1848. Smuts married Johanna Jacoba Bührmann on 25 November 1884 at Ermelo and had three sons and two daughters by her.

== Career ==
Smuts served as a field cornet in the Houtbosberg expedition in Northern Transvaal north of Pietersburg (Polokwane). Later in the war against the indigenous Makhado people (Venda) he was a commander for the district of Ermelo. Smuts was elected a member for Ermelo to the First Volksraad in early 1899.

=== Second Boer War 1899-1902 ===
At the outbreak of the war in October 1899 Smuts joined the Ermelo Command to Natal Colony, was present at the Battle of Modderspruit (30 October 1899) near Ladysmith, and took part in the reconnaissance of Estcourt. Then he fought at the Tugela River front as a common burgher.

He was made an assistant commander of the Ermelo Commando, and after the Battle of Colenso (15 December 1899) was promoted by Louis Botha to fighting general (Afrikaans: veggeneraal) on the Upper Tugela, where he had command from a distance over the Battle of Spion Kop (Afrikaans: Slag van Spioenkop, 23–24 January 1900). When Transvaal Commandos transferred from Natal to the Orange Free State, Smuts led them as Assistant Commander General and joined in the fighting near Brandfort. Afterwards he returned to Pretoria to take part in the last session of the Volksraad there. In the army officer's meeting of 2 June 1900 in Pretoria Smuts agreed with the proposal of Danie Theron to fight on. Presidents Paul Kruger and Marthinus Steyn, who first considered peace negotiations with the British, concurred.

Smuts fought in the lost Battle of Donkerhoek (Diamond Hill, 11 – 12 June 1900), and afterwards was sent to the Wakkerstroom area. Under the command of general Chris Botha Smuts led the remaining Ermelo, Carolina, Standerton, and Swaziland Commandos but was unable to stop the superior force of British second-in-command Redvers Buller marching north. It proved impossible to expel Buller's troops from their camps along the railway, so Smuts had to fall back all the time.

Smuts stayed in the field in the eastern districts of Transvaal up to the ending of the war by the Treaty of Vereeniging signed on 31 May 1902.

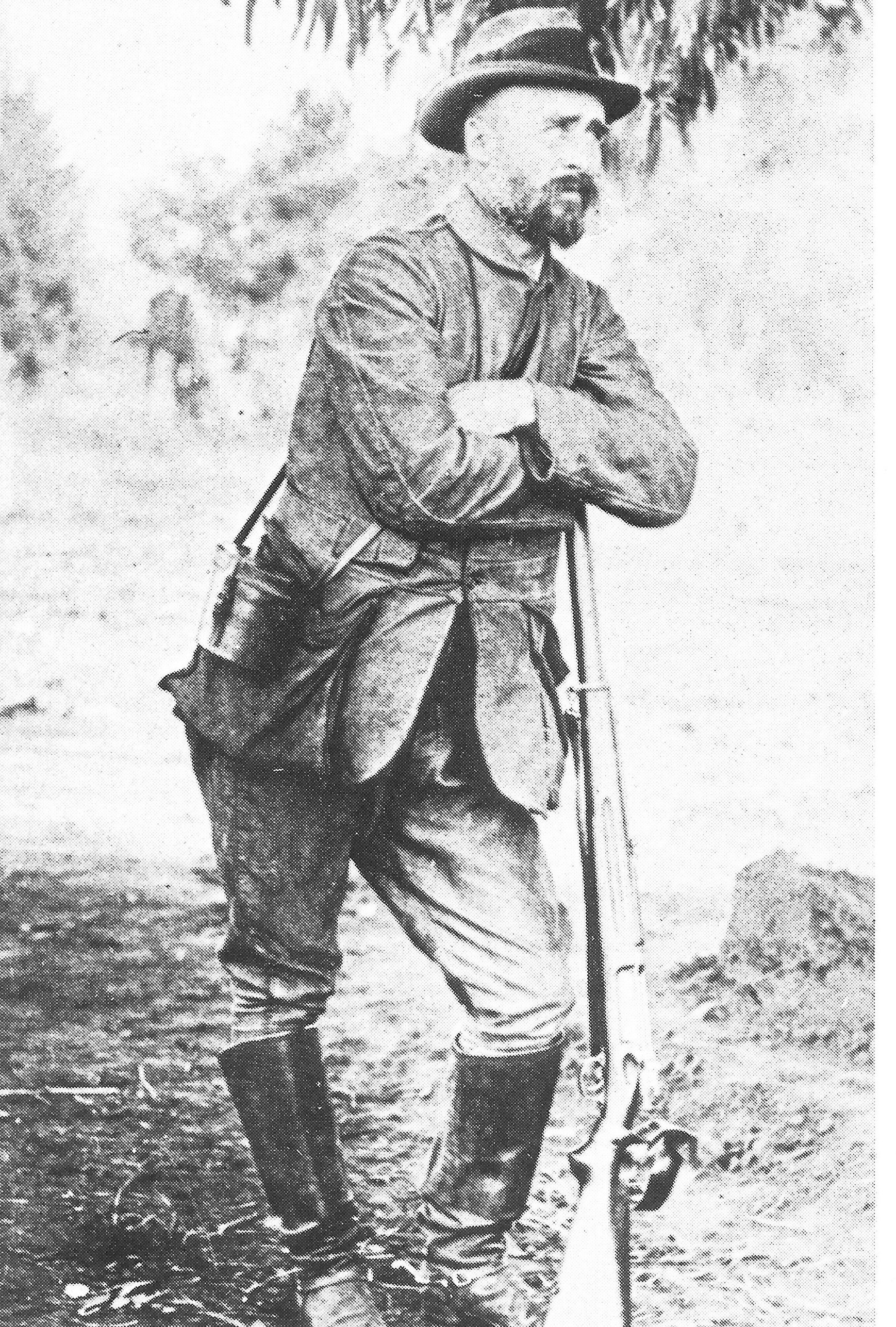
Boer War Boer general Tobias Smuts, leaning on a rifle.

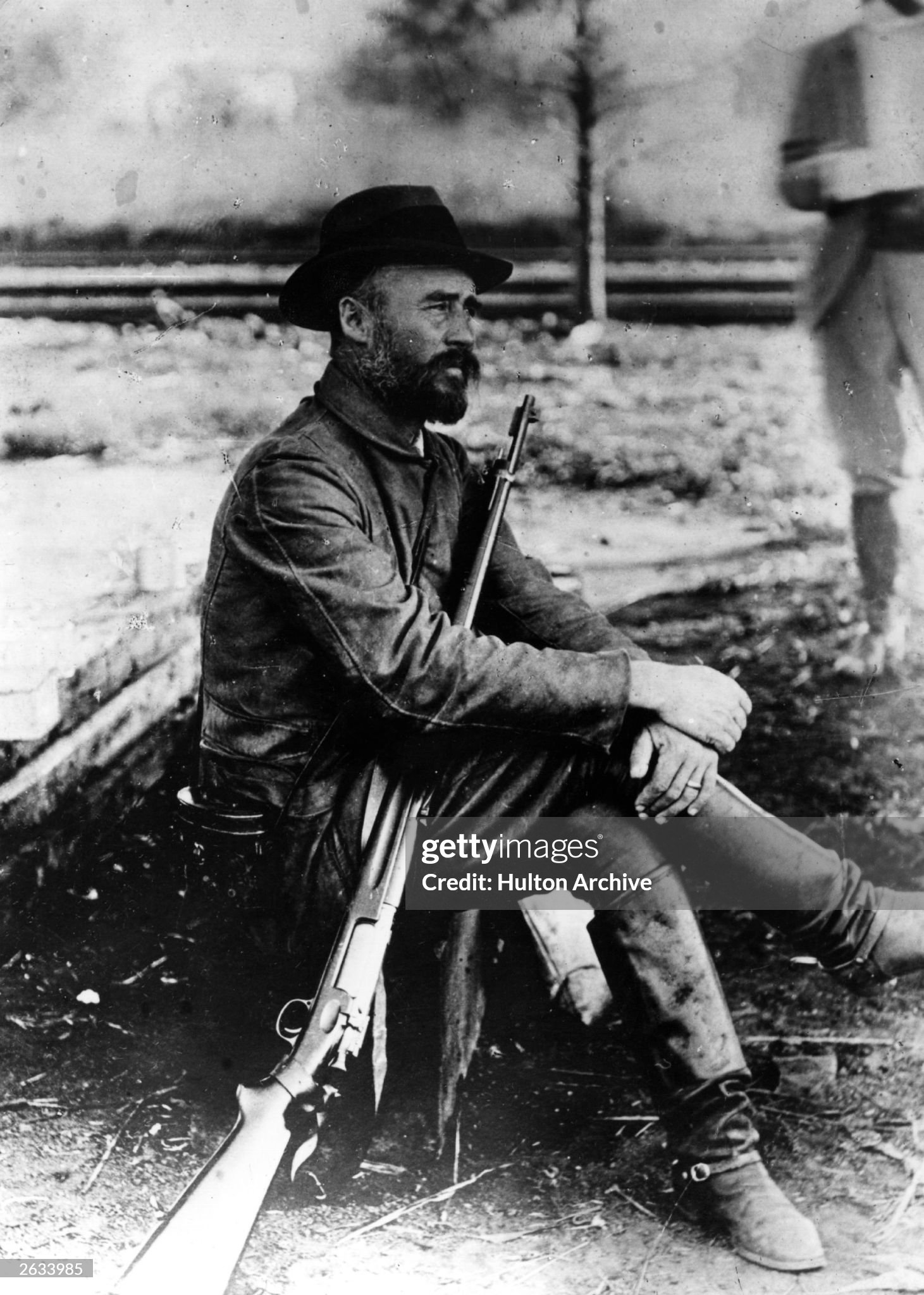
Jan van Hoepen: Boer general Tobias Smuts.

== Publication ==
- Smuts, Tobias (1902). Letter from assistant-general Tobias Smuts to commandant-general L.P. Botha. Great Britain: H.M.S.O. (His Majesty's Stationery Office). OCLC 89678177.

== Literature ==
- A.E., Onze Krijgs-officieren. Album van portretten met levens-schetsen der Transvaalse Generaals en Kommandanten (Translated title: Our Military Officers. Album of portraits with life sketches of the Transvaal Generals and Commandants), Volksstem, Pretoria 1904. In Dutch with a preface by Louis Botha. PDF on Wikimedia Commons. Page 37.
- J. H. Breytenbach, Die Geskiedenis van die Tweede Vryheidsoorlog in Suid-Afrika, 1899–1902, Die Staatsdrukker Pretoria, 1969–1996. In Afrikaans.
  - Breytenbach, J. H. (1971). Die eerste Britse offensief, Nov. – Des. 1899 [The first British offensive, Nov. – Dec. 1899]. Die Geskiedenis van die Tweede Vryheidsoorlog in Suid-Afrika, 1899–1902 (in Afrikaans). Vol. II. Pretoria: Die Staatsdrukker. Kommandant T. Smuts on pages 242, 272, 308note, 309note, and 325.
  - Breytenbach, J. H. (1973). Die stryd in Natal, Jan. – Feb. 1900 [The battle in Natal, Jan. – Feb. 1900]. Die Geskiedenis van die Tweede Vryheidsoorlog in Suid-Afrika, 1899–1902 (in Afrikaans). Vol. III. Pretoria: Die Staatsdrukker. ISBN 9780797012394. OCLC 612581136.. General T. Smuts, on pages 56, 58, 97, 107, 112, 134, 139, 189, 253, 259-260, 265, 267-286, 289, 292, 290, 295-298, 301, 305-309, 314-317, 322, 334, 343, and 402.
  - Breytenbach, J. H. (1983). Die Britse Opmars tot in Pretoria [The British advance to Pretoria]. Die Geskiedenis van die Tweede Vryheidsoorlog in Suid-Afrika, 1899–1902 (in Afrikaans). Vol. V. Pretoria: Die Staatsdrukker. ISBN 9780621083606. OCLC 769254652. General Tobias Smuts on pages 146-148, 173, 178, 182-183, 186-189, 262, 289-295, 355, 395, 402, 418, 442, 465-466, 501-503, 530, 538, 541, 553-554. Photograph 26.
  - Breytenbach, J. H. (1996). Die beleg van Mafeking tot met die Slag van Bergendal [The siege of Mafeking up to the Battle of Bergendal]. Die Geskiedenis van die Tweede Vryheidsoorlog in Suid-Afrika, 1899–1902 (in Afrikaans). Vol. VI. Pretoria: Die Staatsdrukker. ISBN 9780797033214. OCLC 813492747. General Tobias Smuts on pages 75, 165-166, 176, 182, 184, 188, 190, 194, 198, 203, 292-295, 297-300, 308-311, and 315-316.
- Krüger QC (1961). "Smuts, Tobias". In Beyers CJ (ed.). Dictionary of South African Biography Vol IV (1st ed.). Durban and Pretoria: Butterworth & Co (SA). p. 586. ISBN 0409 09183 9. OCLC 1063845175.
