= Vixen (RV) =

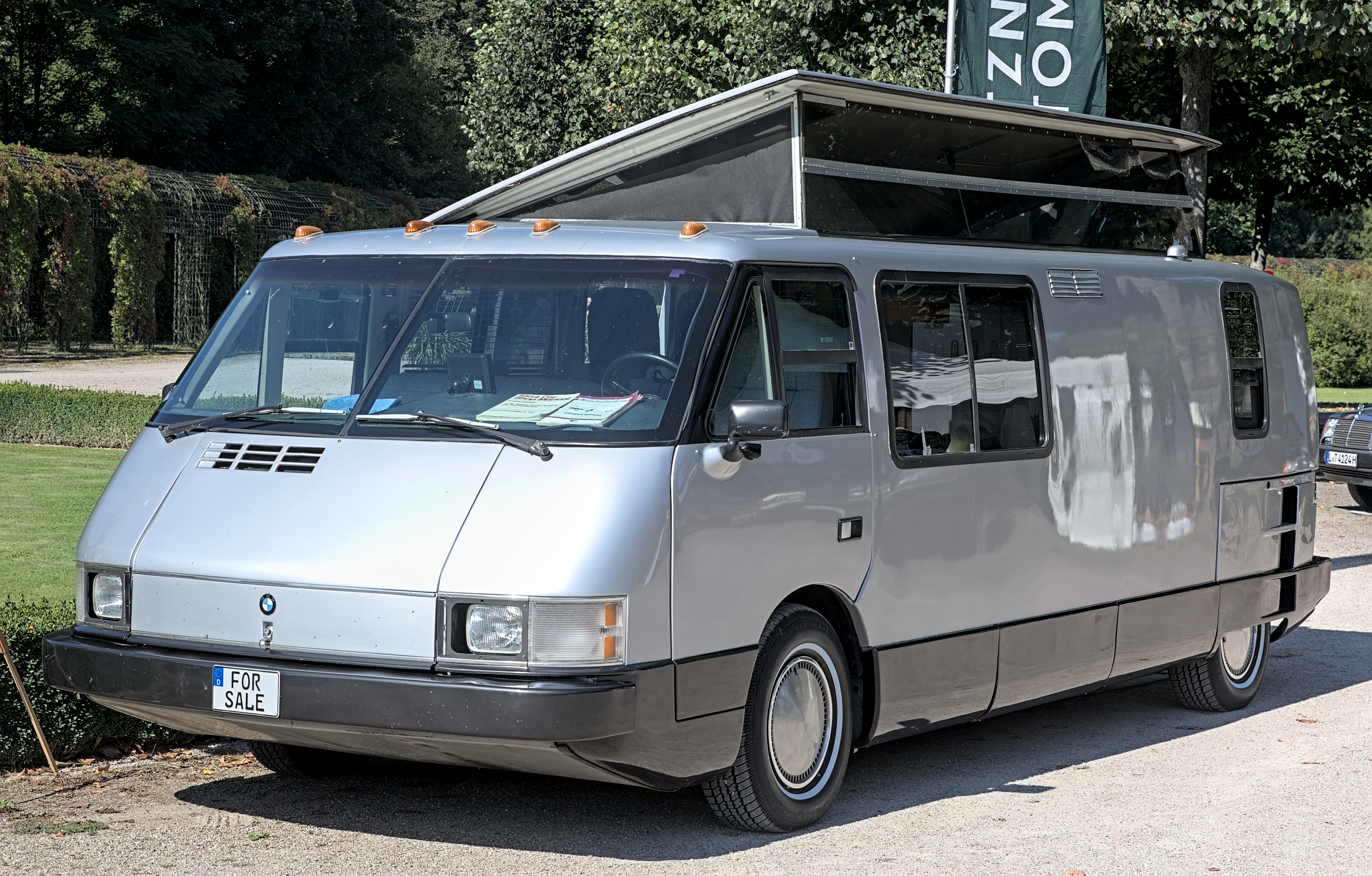

Overview
- Manufacturer: Vixen Motor Company
- Production: 1986-1989
- Designer: Bill Collins

Body and chassis
- Class: A
- Body style: Recreational Vehicle
- Chassis: Welded steel frame w/ fiberglass body

Powertrain
- Engine: Models TD and XE: 2.4L 115hp BMW I6 M21 Turbodiesel; Model SE: 3.8L 165hp GM V6 3800 series
- Transmission: Models TD and XE used the Renault UN1 5 speed manual transmission. It is the same rear wheel drive manual transmission used in the Delorean. Model SE used a GM 4-speed automatic w/ overdrive

Dimensions
- Wheelbase: 148 in (3,759 mm)
- Length: 250.2 in (6,355 mm)
- Width: 85 in (2,159 mm)
- Curb weight: 5,100 lb (2,313 kg)

The Vixen is a recreational vehicle designed by William "Bill" Collins Jr. and built from 1986 until 1989. A total of 587 Vixen motorhomes of three different types were built: the Vixen 21 TD (1986–1987), Vixen 21 SE (1988–1989), and Vixen 21 XC (1986–1987).

Often noted as the "Driver's RV", it has an exceptionally low center of gravity and wide stance for an RV. Sales information claimed a top speed of 100 MPH, and claimed an economy of 30 MPG (at 55mph, which was the speed limit in 1986) using a BMW M21 turbo-diesel engine. Wind tunnel testing was used to create a completely smooth fiberglass exterior top and bottom, resulting in a drag coefficient of less than .30 for early TD models.

== Initial design ==
Bill Collins, a creative designer, created designs that were fresh as compared to the mainstream standards. The Pontiac GTO, the DeLorean car and the Vixen TD21 are testaments to this creativity. The DeLorean and the Vixen were considered quirky in design, and as a result, they didn't sell well, but now are valued by rabid enthusiasts who enjoy Collins' interesting and sometimes not well-thought-out ideas. The Vixen was designed in response to the GMC motorhome. The Vixen was designed to be stored in a typical garage as it was only 6 feet high and 21 feet long. Despite its small size by motorhome standards, the Vixen was marketed as having all of the features of larger competitors.

The original model, the TD (Turbo Diesel), included a full sized bed, a 4 person dinette area, a full galley, a full bathroom with a shower, and hot water provided by a heat exchanger heated by both engine heat and a Webasto diesel fired inline water heater. The same engine heat and inline water heater was used to warm the passenger compartment. This heat was convenient because it used fuel from the engine fuel tank and didn't need propane to fuel it. Unfortunately, the Webasto heater was notorious for needing service. Two house batteries and one of the first electric inverters in an RV allowed the owner to run the microwave, air-conditioning, and anything else which could be plugged into 120-volt outlets, off the batteries that were charged by the 120-amp alternator. The Vixen could also be plugged in at a typical campsite outlet. Water came from the fresh water tank or services at a campsite.

Upon arriving at the destination the TD had a fiberglass roof hinged up on one side and fold-out plexiglass windows filled the gap, allowing a 6'2" individual to stand fully and walk around. This plexiglass system didn't seal the gap very well, so many owners needed to jump out of bed in the night to put the roof down if a rainstorm happened in the night. A curtain in the bath attached to the raised roof to keep water in the shower and for privacy, with a sump to move water from the shower floor up to the holding tank. The front seats on the TD could be used facing forward for riding or flipped backwards to face the dinette to seat four at meal time. Both dinette seats could be folded flat to provide a front bed, while a full sized bed was in the back above the engine and used a standard full size mattress. The galley included a microwave, an electric refrigerator, a double sink, and an optional alcohol fired stove.

The Vixen 21TD was powered by a BMW 2.4 liter diesel engine. Bill Collins originally designed the vehicle to use an engine from Isuzu, but Isuzu was not able to deliver when the time came. The BMW engine was the only other small diesel engine meeting USA emission standards at the time so it was used. This engine came from a BMW 524TD, which was a car that weighed half as much as a Vixen and had an automatic transmission. When placed in the Vixen, this engine did well once the vehicle was moving, but because it was designed for an automatic transmission, it had very little torque at low RPM. For this reason, Vixen TDs have much difficulty starting from a stop, especially if starting up a hill. Some Vixens owners have modified their transmissions to create a lower first gear or have replaced the engine with a more powerful one, but most simply avoid getting stopped on a hill. Despite the sales claims of 100mph top speed, the Vixen 21TD was not very fast. Car and Driver magazine tested the 21TD and logged a 0 to 60 acceleration time of 21.8 seconds and a 0 to 80 acceleration time of 37.7 seconds. They reported a 1/4 mile time of 23.2 seconds at a whopping 62mph final speed. In the article, they did cite the 100mph top speed, but there was not indication of whether they were able to obtain this speed on a test. (Car and Driver magazine October 1986 "Vixen 21TD") The 21TD did fairly well once up to speed on level pavement, but climbing hills was challenging. The TD could climb a 6% freeway grade at about 35 mph, but the engine would overheat if this lasted more than a minute or two.

One Vixen, serial number -002, which was the first production Vixen built, has attempted a land speed record. Driver Dale Janssens was able to reach a top speed of 108.9 mph after several modifications including aerodynamics, suspension, and engine modifications.

== Reaction and modifications ==
Though the driving press seemed to love it, the public only bought a bit over 300 of the original TD model in the first two years of business. Financing took a hit. As the sales didn't materialize the designers and factory started making changes hoping for a hit. The first change was a model called the XC that was envisioned as a large taxi or limo. The kitchen and bath were removed and more couches were installed but the bed in the back was kept because it was empty space over the engine and not usable for anything else. This resulted in a limo with seating for nine.

The following year the company tried to appeal to the traditional RV market by removing the more radical features and using technology commonly liked by the typical RV buyer. This was the SE model. A more powerful Buick V6 gasoline engine was installed with an automatic transmission, making the SE model much easier to drive than the quirky TD. The lift up roof was replaced by a fixed, taller roof that a 6'4" person could stand comfortably under. The dinette with the flip over seats was replaced by a single, fixed couch facing across the vehicle, propane was used for cooking and heating, and it had a 110 volt gasoline fired generator. The 110 volt air conditioner was moved from the closet to the roof, creating more storage space but raising the total height. This meant the SE needed a high-roof garage or suffered outdoor parking. The engine cooling radiator was moved to the front of the vehicle into the space that was a trunk on the TD. This was done to solve the overheating problem that plagued the TD, but it was only a partial solution. The V6 Buick engine was placed in such a small enclosure near the rear of the Vixen that it had little ventilation and the overheating problem persisted.

The SE was the final model produced by Vixen. Fewer than 300 units were sold before the company ceased operations in 1989. Some of the company's assets were subsequently acquired by a group of owners. The Vixen Owners Association later provided owners with information on maintenance, repairs, and other aspects of preserving the vehicles.
