= Bill Collins (footballer, born 1933) =

Australian rules footballer

Personal information
- Full name: Bill Collins
- Born: 23 January 1933
- Died: 5 March 2004 (aged 71)
- Original team: Richmond Thirds / East Malvern
- Height: 185 cm (6 ft 1 in)
- Weight: 83 kg (183 lb)

Playing career^{1}
Years	Club	Games (Goals)
1952–53, 1955	Hawthorn	31 (22)
- ^{1} Playing statistics correct to the end of 1955.

Bill Collins (23 January 1933 – 5 March 2004) was an Australian rules footballer who played for the Hawthorn Football Club in the Victorian Football League (VFL).
