= William Collins (modeller) =

English modeller

- Died: May 1793; Tothill Fields, Westminster, England
- Occupation: Modeller

William Collins (died May 1793) was an English modeller.

== Biography ==
Collins had a large practice during the last half of the eighteenth century as a modeller of friezes and bas-reliefs for chimneypieces, reredoses, &c. He was one of the first members of the St. Martin's Lane Academy, and a member of the Incorporated Society of Artists, and signed the roll declaration in 1765, being one of the first directors of that society. He contributed to the first exhibition in 1760, and continued to exhibit up to 1763; among the bas-reliefs exhibited by him were "Spring—Boys with a Bird"s Nest,' and "Romulus and Remus" (1760), "Mary Magdalene and the other Mary coming to the sepulchre" (1761); "Belisarius' (1763); "Bacchus and Ariadne" (1764); "Œdipus" (1765), subjects from Æsop"s fables, &c. He modelled a prototype bust of Francis Hayman's "Don Quixote." A good example of his work, a bas-relief, representing "The Resurrection," was made for the chapel of Magdalene College, Cambridge, in 1756, and is now in the library of that college. In Ralph Willett's "Description of the Library at Merly, Dorset" (London, 1785), there is a vignette of Minerva on the title-page from a model by Collins. William Sharp also engraved two large oval subjects of "Britannia" and "Athens" from models by Collins. Collins was a friend of Thomas Gainsborough, and resided in Tothill Fields, Westminster, where he died in May 1793.
