= James Davies (headmaster) =

English scholar (1820–1883)

Rev. James Davies, born James Banks, (20 May 1820 – 11 March 1883) was an English classical scholar, writer, headmaster, landowner, and prebendary of the Church of England.

== Biography ==
James Banks was born in Herefordshire. He matriculated at St Mary Hall, Oxford, in October 1841 and became a scholar of Lincoln College, Oxford, graduating there B.A. 1844, M.A. 1846. He was ordained in 1845. He was for some years headmaster of King Edward's School, Ludlow, and perpetual curate of Christ Church, Forest of Dean. In 1858 by royal license he assumed the surname of Davies in lieu of Banks, due to coming into possession of some property near Kington, Herefordshire.

After coming into possession of landed property he resided on his estate at Moor Court, near Kington, where he combined the functions of squire, clergyman, and banker, becoming a partner in his brother's bank and erecting a church in his own grounds for the convenience of his neighbours, for whom the parish church was too remote. His time, however, was principally devoted to literature, especially the pursuits of classical scholarship.

In 1875 he was made a prebendary of Hereford, in which diocese he was also inspector of schools. He wrote most of the articles on classical subjects in the Saturday Review for many years, and also contributed to other periodicals.

He married in 1847; the marriage produced many children. His estate was an inheritance from his great-uncle James Davies, DL.

== Selected publications ==
=== Essays ===
- "Epigrams". The Quarterly Review. 117: 204–249. 1865.
- "Epigrammatists and Epigrams". The Contemporary Review. 14: 616–635. April 1870.
- "Ornamental and Useful Tree-Planting". The Quarterly Review: 50–83. July 1876.

=== Books ===
- Nugae. 1854.
- Fables of Babrius. 1860. (translated into English verse from the text of Sir George Cornewall Lewis)
- Hesiod and Theognis. 1873.
- Catullus, Tibullus and Propertius. 1876.
