= William Collins (cricketer, born 1848) =

Welsh first-class cricketer and author

Personal information
- Full name: William Edmund Wood Collins
- Born: 16 June 1848; Cheriton, Glamorgan, Wales
- Died: 7 January 1932 (aged 83); Heacham, Norfolk, England
- Nickname: Colenso
- Batting: Unknown
- Bowling: Left-arm fast

Career statistics
Competition	First-class
Matches	7
Runs scored	157
Batting average	19.62
100s/50s	–/2
Top score	56*
Balls bowled	977
Wickets	19
Bowling average	23.57
5 wickets in innings	3
10 wickets in match	–
Best bowling	6/35
Catches/stumpings	3/–
- Source: Cricinfo, 5 August 2019

William Edmund Wood Collins (16 June 1848 – 7 January 1932) was a Welsh first-class cricketer and author.

The son of the essayist William Lucas Collins, he was born in Glamorgan at Cheriton in June 1848. Collins was educated at Radley College, before going up to Jesus College, Oxford.

He did not feature in first-class cricket for Oxford University, at a time when the side was dominated by players from Brasenose College. He married Margaret Elizabeth Stepford Sackville in 1882.

He eventually played first-class cricket in 1884, when he played for the Gentlemen of England against Oxford University at Oxford. He played again for the Gentlemen of England in 1886, this time against I Zingari in the Scarborough Festival of 1886. Held in high regard by C. I. Thornton, Collins was invited by him to play for Lord Londesborough's XI against the touring Australians at the festival. In the Lord Londesborough's XI first-innings total of 558, Collins came into bat at number eleven, scoring 56 runs. He played again at the 1887 Scarborough Festival in two first-class matches, for the Gentlemen of England against I Zingari and for the South in the North v South fixture. He was invited to play for the Oxford University Past and Present cricket team against the touring Australians at Leyton in 1888, taking figures of 6 for 35 in the Australians first-innings. His final first-class appearance came three years later for H. Philipson's XI against Oxford University. Across seven first-class matches, Collins scored 157 runs at an average of 19.62, while with the ball he took 19 wickets at a bowling average of 23.57.

He played below first-class at county level for Northamptonshire, Hertfordshire and, in one match in 1903, for Shropshire.

Away from playing cricket, Collins was a regular contributor to Blackwood's Magazine and published two works of fiction set in Oxford: The Don and the Undergraduate (1899) and A Scholar of his College (1900). Collins died in January 1932 at Summerhill, Heacham, Norfolk. He was described by A. J. Webbe at the time of his death in a letter to The Times as "a very fine left-handed bowler, essentially the man for a hard wicket, as he was very fast off the pitch and came a lot with his arm. Also a great hitter."
