= William Lucas Collins =

Church of England priest and essayist

William Lucas Collins (baptised 23 May 1815 – 24 March 1887) was a Church of England priest and essayist.

== Life and career ==
William Lucas Collins was born in 1815 at Oxwich, near Swansea, Glamorgan, south Wales. He was sent to be educated at Rugby School (1829–33) and Jesus College, Oxford (matriculating in 1833, obtaining a BA in Literae Humaniores in 1838 and his MA in 1840).

He was ordained in 1840 and held the benefice of the parish of Cheriton, Swansea from 1840 until 1867. He also held positions as curate of Great Houghton, Northamptonshire (1853 to 1862), a diocesan inspector of education, rector of St Peter's Church, Lowick (1873 to his death) and vicar of Slipton, Northamptonshire (1876 to his death). He was an honorary Canon of Peterborough Cathedral from 1870.

He was also a writer, contributing articles on university life and public schools to Blackwood's Magazine. He also edited volumes on Homer's Iliad and Thucydides for the publisher John Blackwood's series Ancient Classics for English Readers.

Collins died on 24 March 1887, in Lowick rectory. His son was the author and first-class cricketer William Collins.

== Works ==
=== Books ===
- The Public Schools : Winchester Westminster Shrewsbury Harrow Rugby: Notes of their History and Traditions (1867)
- Virgil Ancient Classics for English Readers (1870)
- Livy Ancient Classics for English Readers (1870)
- Homer: the Odyssey Ancient Classics for English Readers (1870)
- Homer : the Iliad Ancient Classics for English Readers (1871)
- Aristophanes Ancient Classics for English Readers (1872)
- Cicero Ancient Classics for English Readers (1873)
- Lucian Ancient Classics for English Readers (1875)
- Thucydides Ancient Classics for English Readers (1878)
- Montaigne Foreign Classics for English Readers (1879)
- Butler Philosophical Classics for English Readers (1881)
- La Fontaine and Other French Fabulists Foreign Classics for English Readers (1882)
- Plautus and Terence Ancient Classics for English Readers (1882)

=== Articles ===
- "Cleopatra" Encyclopaedia Britannica, Ninth Edition (1875–89)

== Sources ==
- Curthoys, M. C. (October 2006). "Collins, William Lucas (1815–1887)". Oxford Dictionary of National Biography. Oxford University Press.
