= Climate prediction =

Climate prediction is a subset of numerical weather prediction dealing with generalized forecasts beyond the usual short-range and medium-range forecast periods. It is part of the broader science of climatology.

Among items that include the phrase "climate prediction" in their name include:

- Climate Prediction Center, an agency of the United States government
- Climateprediction.net, a collaborative climate ensemble
- ClimatePredictionMarket.com, a prediction market developed by Winton Group to form a consensus on climate change
