= Bill Collins (American football) =

American sports coach and administrator

Biographical details
- Born: May 21, 1894; Lathrop, Missouri, U.S.

Playing career

Football
- 1916–1919: Missouri
- Position: Halfback

Coaching career (HC unless noted)

Football
- 1920: Missouri (freshmen)
- 1921–1922: Liberty HS (MO)
- 1923–1925: Missouri Wesleyan
- 1926: William Jewell (assistant)
- 1927–1932: William Jewell

Basketball
- 1928–1933: William Jewell

Administrative career (AD unless noted)
- 1923–?: Missouri Wesleyan

Head coaching record
- Overall: 33–30–11 (college football); 50–35 (college basketball)

Accomplishments and honors

Championships
- Football; 1 MCAC (1925)

William Newton Collins (born May 21, 1894) was an American football and basketball coach and college athletics administrator. He served as the head football coach at Missouri Wesleyan College in Cameron, Missouri from 1923 to 1925 and William Jewell College in Liberty, Missouri from 1927 to 1932. Collins was also the head basketball coach at William Jewell from 1928 to 1933, tallying a mark of 50–35.

Collins played college football as a halfback at the University of Missouri from 1916 to 1919. In 1920, he coached Missouri's freshman football team. The following year, Collins was the football coach at Liberty High School in Liberty. After two years at Liberty High School, Collins was appointed athletic director and head football coach at Missouri Wesleyan, succeeding Earl A. Davis.

== Head coaching record ==
=== College football ===
Year	Team	Overall	Conference	Standing	Bowl/playoffs
Missouri Wesleyan Owls (Missouri Intercollegiate Athletic Association) (1923)
1923	Missouri Wesleyan	5–0	5–0		
Missouri Wesleyan Owls (Missouri College Athletic Union) (1924–1925)
1924	Missouri Wesleyan	6–2	5–1	2nd	
1925	Missouri Wesleyan	6–2	5–0	1st	
Missouri Wesleyan:		17–4	15–1		
William Jewell Cardinals (Missouri College Athletic Union) (1927–1932)
1927	William Jewell	4–4	3–3	5th	
1928	William Jewell	3–5–1	2–3	5th	
1929	William Jewell	4–3–1	1–2–1	T–5th	
1930	William Jewell	2–5–1	2–2	3rd	
1931	William Jewell	2–3–4	0–1–3	T–5th	
1932	William Jewell	1–6	1–3	T–5th	
William Jewell:		16–26–7	9–24–4		
Total:		33–30–11			
National championship Conference title Conference division title or championship game berth
