= Bill Collins (footballer, born 1871) =

Australian rules footballer

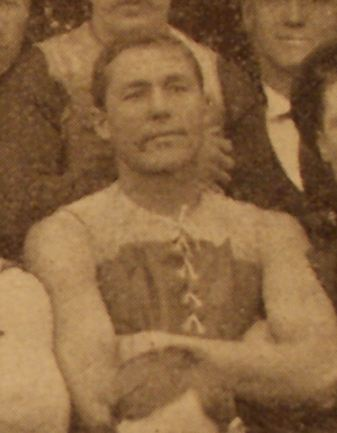
- Collins in 1899

Personal information
- Full name: William Collins
- Born: 14 May 1871; Rutherglen, Victoria
- Died: 13 July 1942 (aged 71); Rutherglen, Victoria
- Original teams: Rutherglen, Excelsior
- Position: Follower

Playing career^{1}
Years	Club	Games (Goals)
1899–1900	Carlton	10 (2)
- ^{1} Playing statistics correct to the end of 1900.

William Collins (14 May 1871 – 13 July 1942) was an Australian rules footballer who played for the Carlton Football Club in the Victorian Football League (VFL).

Collins debuted for Carlton in 1899, then returned home to Rutherglen to play with Excelsior in their 1900 Ovens & Murray Football League premiership before returning to Carlton to play the last three games in 1900.
