= Bill Collins (automotive engineer) =

American automotive engineer (1932 - 2023)

- Born: William Thaw Collins Jr. April 3, 1932; Bryn Mawr, Pennsylvania
- Died: March 5, 2023 (aged 90); Michigan
- Education: Lehigh University

William Thaw Collins Jr. (April 3, 1932 – March 5, 2023) was an American automotive engineer who is most remembered as the "Father of the Pontiac GTO".

== Early life ==
Collins was born on April 3, 1932 in Bryn Mawr, Pennsylvania. Collins studied engineering at Lehigh University, graduating in 1955. After school, Collins served in the U.S. Army as an engineer, testing advanced landing craft at the Aberdeen Proving Ground in Maryland.

== Career ==
=== General Motors ===
After leaving the Army, Collins worked at Pontiac as an engineer. In 1964, he was reviewing the 1964 Pontiac Tempest with John DeLorean and pointed out that the more powerful 389 engine from the brand's full-size cars would easily fit into the same space the Tempest's 326 engine. DeLorean greenlit the idea, and within a week, they had a running prototype of the Pontiac GTO, the car that many have claimed started the muscle car era.

=== DeLorean Motor Cars, AMC, and Vixen ===
In October 1974, after 16 years at Pontiac, Collins left General Motors to join John DeLorean to lead development of the new DeLorean sports car. Collins resigned from DeLorean Motor Cars in 1979 after Lotus Cars took over final production of the DeLorean. Collins would go on to become head of product planning at AMC. His time at AMC was brief and left to start his own motorhome company, developing a 21-foot vehicle that could fit in a standard garage, powered by a BMW engine. Collins built a prototype motorhome in his garage, launching Vixen Motor Company in 1981. Vixen Motor Company shut down in 1989. Collins consulted for Pontiac for a few years before retiring in 1992.

== Death ==
Collins died on March 5, 2023, at his home in Michigan at the age of 90.
