= Billy Collins (Australian footballer) =

Australian rules footballer, born 1909

Personal information
- Full name: William Henry Collins
- Born: 29 November 1909
- Died: 15 January 1982 (aged 72); Camberwell, Victoria
- Original team: Preston CYMS (CYMSFA)

Playing career^{1}
Years	Club	Games (Goals)
1931	Melbourne	2 (0)
- ^{1} Playing statistics correct to the end of 1931.

Billy Collins (29 November 1909 – 15 January 1982) was an Australian rules footballer who played with Melbourne in the Victorian Football League (VFL).
