= Bill Collins (rugby union) =

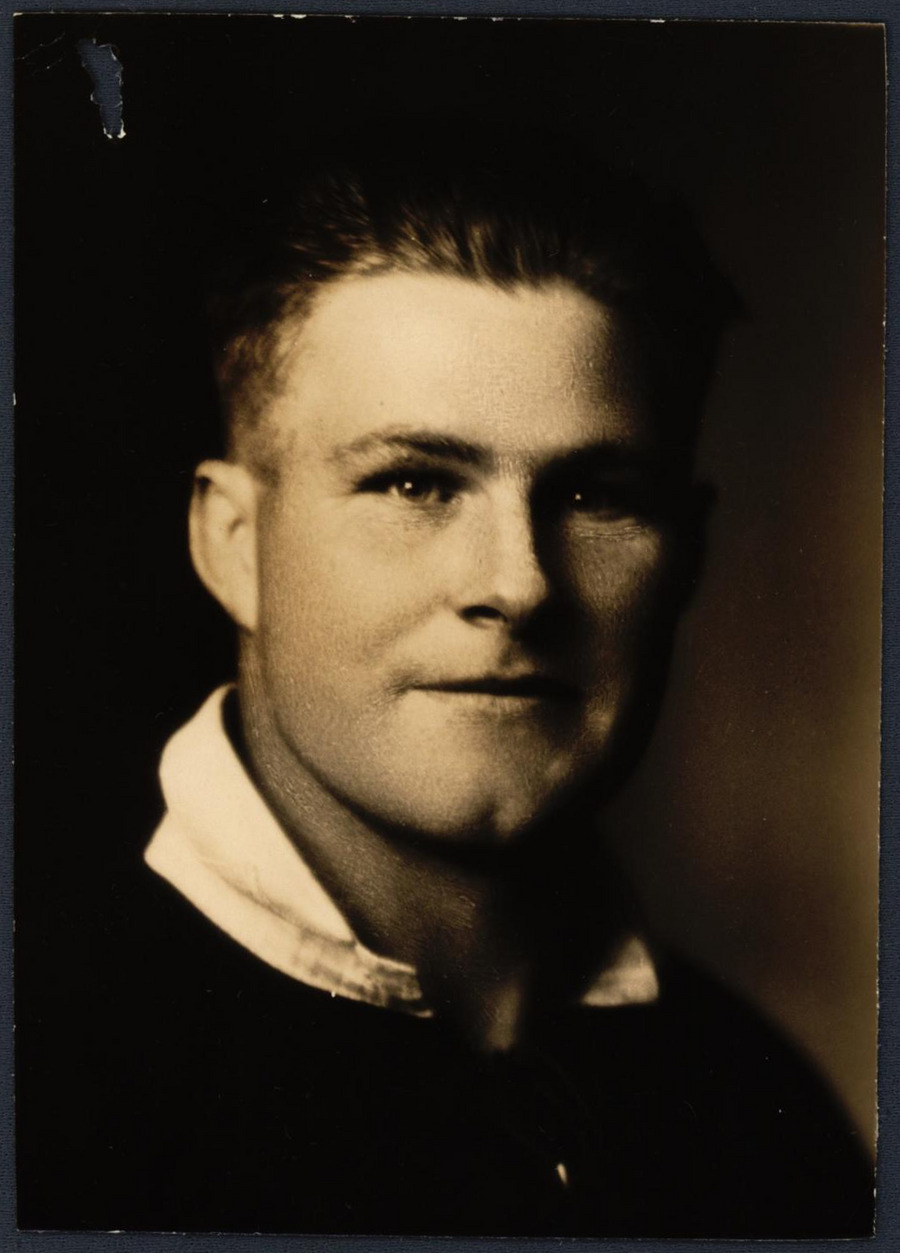
- William Collins in 1935
- Born: William Reuben Collins; 18 October 1911 Makuri, New Zealand
- Died: 9 September 1993 (aged 81) Auckland, New Zealand
- Height: 1.88 m (6 ft 2 in)
- Weight: 99 kg (218 lb)
- Occupation: Carpenter

Rugby union career
International career
Years	Team	Apps	(Points)
1935–36	New Zealand	0	(0)

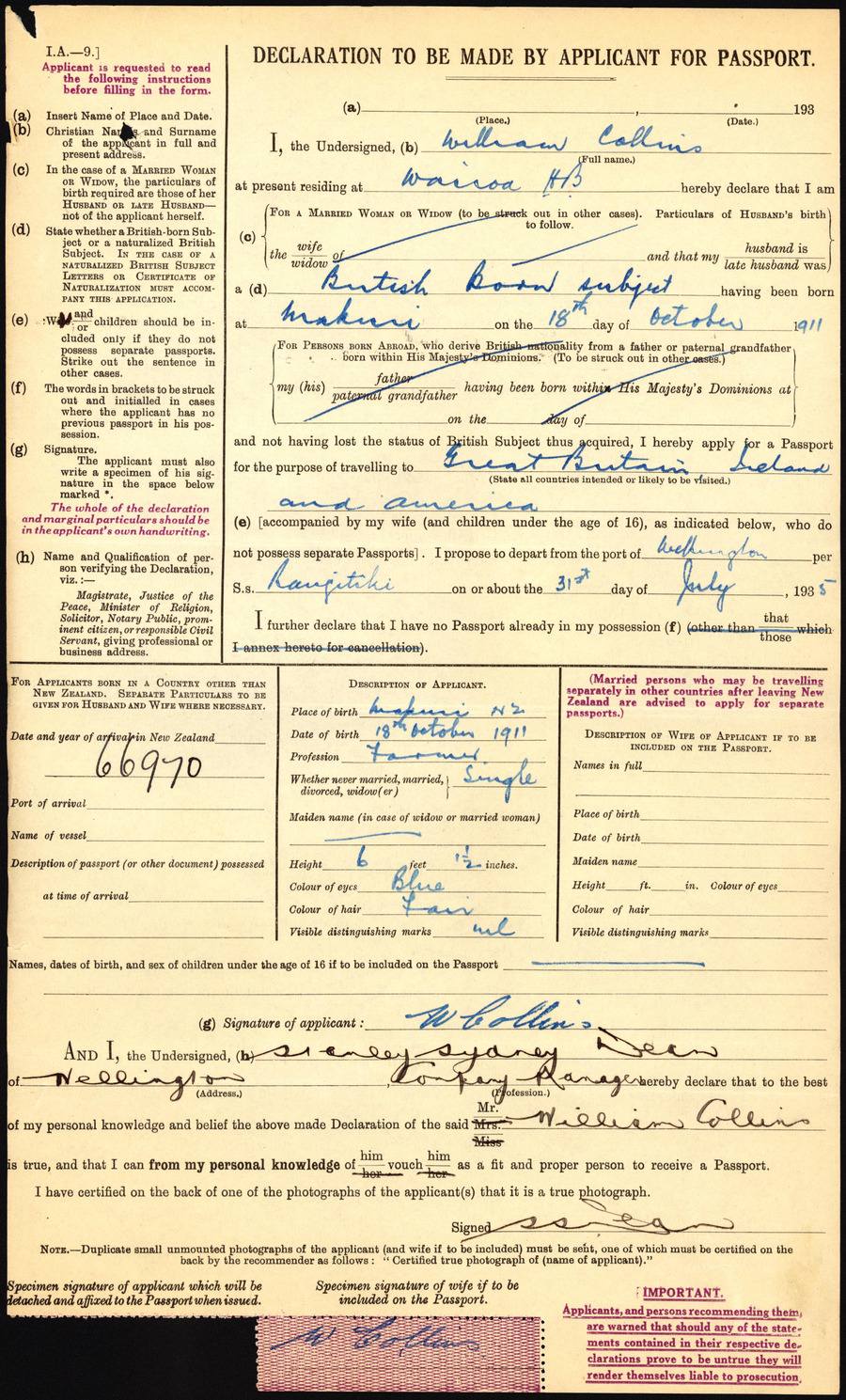
William Collins passport application (1935)

William Reuben Collins (18 October 1911 – 9 September 1993) was a New Zealand rugby union player. As a lock, Collins represented Poverty Bay and Hawkes Bay at a provincial level, and was a member of the New Zealand national side, the All Blacks, from 1934 to 1936. He never played a full test for New Zealand due to injury, but was part of the 1935–36 New Zealand rugby union tour of Britain, Ireland and Canada where he played in matches against local sides.

He died aged 81 in Auckland in 1993.
