= William Richard Collins =

Colonel-Commandant William Richard Collins, DTD, DSO (1876–1944) was a South African politician. He served as Minister of Agriculture and Forestry from 1938 to 1944.

Born at Lydenburg, Transvaal, Collins was British on his father's side, but identified with the Afrikaners. During the Second Boer War, he fought on the Boer side.

In 1939, he seconded J. B. M. Hertzog's motion for South Africa to remain neutral in the Second World War.
