= 2003 Shelbourne F.C. season =

Shelbourne
2003 season
- Chairman: Ollie Byrne
- Manager: Pat Fenlon
- Premier Division: 1st
- UEFA Cup: Qualifying round
- FAI Cup: Third round
- League Cup: First round
- Top goalscorer: League: Jason Byrne (21); All: Jason Byrne (25)
Home colours	Away colours

In the 2003 season, Shelbourne were crowned League of Ireland Premier Division champions.

== Personnel ==
=== Managerial/backroom staff ===
Manager: Pat Fenlon

=== 2003 squad members ===
Note: Flags indicate national team as defined under FIFA eligibility rules; some limited exceptions apply. Players may hold more than one non-FIFA nationality.

No.	Pos.	Nation	Player
—	GK	(Wales) WAL	Steve Williams
—	GK	(Scotland) SCO	Chris Bennion
—	GK	(Republic of Ireland) IRL	Morgan Cranley
—	DF	(Republic of Ireland) IRL	Owen Heary (Captain)
—	DF	(Republic of Ireland) IRL	Jim Gannon
—	DF	(Republic of Ireland) IRL	Kevin Doherty
—	DF	(Republic of Ireland) IRL	Philip Byrne
—	DF	(Wales) WAL	Jamie Harris
—	DF	(England) ENG	Dave Rogers
—	DF	(Republic of Ireland) IRL	Tony McCarthy
—	DF	(Republic of Ireland) IRL	David Crawley
—	DF	(Republic of Ireland) IRL	Derek Dunne
—	DF	(Republic of Ireland) IRL	Stephen Murtagh
—	DF	(Republic of Ireland) IRL	Ciarán Sharkey
—	MF	(Republic of Ireland) IRL	Richie Baker
—	MF	(Republic of Ireland) IRL	Stuart Byrne

No.	Pos.	Nation	Player
—	MF	(Republic of Ireland) IRL	Jim Crawford
—	MF	(England) ENG	Scott Oakes
—	MF	(Republic of Ireland) IRL	Thomas Morgan
—	MF	(Republic of Ireland) IRL	Wes Hoolahan
—	MF	(Republic of Ireland) IRL	Ollie Cahill
—	MF	(Republic of Ireland) IRL	Stephen Murphy
—	FW	(Republic of Ireland) IRL	Jason Byrne
—	FW	(Republic of Ireland) IRL	Stephen Geoghegan
—	FW	(Republic of Ireland) IRL	Dessie Baker
—	FW	(Republic of Ireland) IRL	Ger McCarthy
—	FW	(Republic of Ireland) IRL	Ger Rowe
—	FW	(Republic of Ireland) IRL	Alan Kinsella
—	FW	(Republic of Ireland) IRL	Alan Murphy
—	FW	(Republic of Ireland) IRL	Alan Lee
—	FW	(Republic of Ireland) IRL	Ray Whelehan

== Results/league tables ==
=== League of Ireland Premier Division ===
11 April 2003	Waterford United	0 – 4	Shelbourne	R.S.C., Waterford
19.30 IST		Report	David Crawley 18' (pen.); Stephen Geoghegan 32'; Jason Byrne 44' 75'	Referee: Alan Kelly (Cork)

18 April 2003	Shelbourne	1 – 0	Derry City	Tolka Park, Dublin
19.45 IST	Jason Byrne 4'	Report		Referee: Anthony Buttimer (Cork)

22 April 2003	Shelbourne	3 – 2	Longford Town	Tolka Park, Dublin
19.45 IST	Jason Byrne 18'; Stephen Geoghegan 50'; Jim Gannon 86'	Report	Barry Ferguson 19' (pen.); Sean Francis 58'	Referee: John Feighery (Dublin)

25 April 2003	Drogheda United	1 – 1	Shelbourne	o2 Park, Drogheda
20.00 IST	Danny O'Connor 42'	Report	Jason Byrne 40'	Referee: Ian Stokes (Dublin)

2 May 2003	Shelbourne	2 – 2	St. Patrick's Athletic	Tolka Park, Dublin
19.45 IST	Jason Byrne 1' 80'	Report	Kevin Doherty 55' (o.g); Paul Osam 57'	Referee: Dave McKeon (Meath)

9 May 2003	UCD	0 – 2	Shelbourne	Belfield Park, Dublin
19.45 IST		Report	Wes Hoolahan 48'; Richie Baker 78'	Referee: Alan Kelly (Cork)

16 May 2003	Shelbourne	2 – 2	Bohemians	Tolka Park, Dublin
19.45 IST	Jim Crawford 31'; Ger McCarthy 90'	Report	Glen Crowe 53'; Kevin Hunt 83'	Referee: John McDermott (Dublin)

23 May 2003	Cork City	0 – 0	Shelbourne	Turners Cross, Cork
19.45 IST	John O'Flynn (penalty missed) 90+1' (pen.)	Report	Jim Gannon (red card) 75'; Jim Crawford (red card) 90'	Referee: Jim O’Neill (Waterford)

30 May 2003	Shelbourne	1 – 0	Shamrock Rovers	Tolka Park, Dublin
19.45 IST	Stephen Geoghegan 41'; Jason Byrne (red card) 45'	Report		Referee: Paul McKeon (Dublin)

4 June 2003	Shelbourne	1 – 1	Waterford United	Tolka Park, Dublin
19.45 IST	Ger McCarthy 49'	Report	Gary O'Neill 5'	Referee: Ian Stokes (Dublin)

12 June 2003	Derry City	2 – 0	Shelbourne	Brandywell Stadium, Derry
19.45 IST	Gareth McGlynn 67'; Ciarán Martyn 70'	Report		Referee: Alan Kelly (Cork)

1 July 2003	Longford Town	0 – 2	Shelbourne	Flancare Park, Longford
19.45 IST		Report	Dave Rogers 42'; Ollie Cahill 61'	Referee: Dave McKeon (Meath)

4 July 2003	Shelbourne	3 – 0	Drogheda United	Tolka Park, Dublin
19.45 IST	Stephen Geoghegan 14'; Jim Crawford 75'; Ollie Cahill 80'	Report	Andy Myler (penalty missed) 38' (pen.)	Referee: Alan Kelly (Cork)

11 July 2003	St. Patrick's Athletic	0 – 0	Shelbourne	Richmond Park, Dublin
19.45 IST		Report		Referee: John McDermott (Dublin)

18 July 2003	Shelbourne	1 – 1	UCD	Tolka Park, Dublin
19.45 IST	Jason Byrne 23'	Report	Robbie Griffin 7'	Referee: Ian Stokes (Dublin)

7 August 2003	Shelbourne	1 – 1	Cork City	Tolka Park, Dublin
19.45 IST	Jason Byrne 14'	Report	Kevin Doyle 9'	Referee: Dave McKeon (Meath)

1 September 2003	Waterford United	1 – 2	Shelbourne	R.S.C., Waterford
19.30 IST	Kevin O'Brien 47'	Report	Ollie Cahill 9'; Jason Byrne 12'	Referee: Anthony Buttimer (Cork)

5 September 2003	Shelbourne	3 – 1	Derry City	Tolka Park, Dublin
19.45 IST	Jason Byrne 51'; Jamie Harris 52'; Jim Crawford 62'	Report	Eamon Doherty 50'	Referee: John McDermott (Dublin)

19 September 2003	Shelbourne	2 – 1	Longford Town	Tolka Park, Dublin
19.45 IST	Jason Byrne 18' 60' (pen.)	Report	Eric Lavine 28'	Referee: Ian Stokes (Dublin)

23 September 2003	Drogheda United	0 – 1	Shelbourne	o2 Park, Drogheda
20.00 IST		Report	Jason Byrne 55'

26 September 2003	Shelbourne	2 – 0	St. Patrick's Athletic	Tolka Park, Dublin
19.00 IST	Jason Byrne 22'; Darragh Maguire 42' (o.g.)	Report		Referee: Alan Kelly (Cork)

29 September 2003	Bohemians	1 – 0	Shelbourne	Dalymount Park, Dublin
19.45 IST	Ken Oman 58'	Report		Referee: Paul McKeon (Dublin)

3 October 2003	UCD	0 – 1	Shelbourne	Belfield Park, Dublin
19.45 IST		Report	Jamie Harris 60'	Referee: Pat Whelan (Dublin)

13 October 2003	Cork City	1 – 1	Shelbourne	Turners Cross, Cork
19.45 IST	Liam Kearney 12'	Report	Jamie Harris 90'	Referee: Pat Whelan (Dublin)

17 October 2003	Shelbourne	0 – 2	Shamrock Rovers	Tolka Park, Dublin
19.45 IST		Report	James Keddy 10'; Garry Haylock 90+2'	Referee: Anthony Buttimer (Cork)

20 October 2003	Shelbourne	3 – 1	Waterford United	Tolka Park, Dublin
19.45 IST	Jamie Harris 13'; Wes Hoolahan 38'; Dave Mulcahy 60' (o.g.)	Report	Alan Reilly 64' (pen.)	Referee: Hugo Whoriskey (Meath)

25 October 2003	Derry City	0 – 0	Shelbourne	Brandywell Stadium, Derry
19.30 IST		Report		Referee: Ian Stokes (Dublin)

28 October 2003	Shamrock Rovers	2 – 4	Shelbourne	Tolka Park, Dublin
19.45 IST	Stephen Grant 13'; Glen Fitzpatrick 38'	Report	Jason Byrne 59' (pen.) 78'; Richie Baker 67'; Jamie Harris 74'	Referee: Damien Hancock (Dublin)

4 November 2003	Shelbourne	1 – 3	Bohemians	Tolka Park, Dublin
19.45 GMT	Richie Baker 9'	Report	Paul Keegan 11'; Thomas Heary 42'; Colin Hawkins 55'	Referee: Eddie Barr (Dublin)

7 November 2003	St. Patrick's Athletic	0 – 1	Shelbourne	Richmond Park, Dublin
19.45 GMT	Karim el-Khebyr (red card) 58'	Report	Colm Foley 29' (o.g.)	Referee: Anthony Buttimer (Cork)

10 November 2003	Shelbourne	0 – 0	UCD	Tolka Park, Dublin
19.45 GMT		Report		Referee: Damien Hancock (Dublin)

14 November 2003	Bohemians	0 – 1	Shelbourne	Dalymount Park, Dublin
20.05 GMT		Report	Stuart Byrne 16'	Referee: Alan Kelly (Cork)

17 November 2003	Shelbourne	2 – 0	Drogheda United	Tolka Park, Dublin
19.45 GMT	Jason Byrne 72'; Stuart Byrne 85'	Report		Referee: Paul Tuite (Dublin)

21 November 2003	Shelbourne	2 – 0	Cork City	Tolka Park, Dublin
19.45 GMT	Jason Byrne 26'; Jamie Harris 50'	Report		Referee: John McDermott (Dublin)

24 November 2003	Longford Town	2 – 1	Shelbourne	Flancare Park, Longford
19.30 GMT	Shane Barrett 32'; Vinny Perth 64'	Report	Jason Byrne 20'	Referee: Alan Kelly (Cork)

28 November 2003	Shamrock Rovers	1 – 1	Shelbourne	Tolka Park, Dublin
19.45 GMT	Stephen McGuinness 55'	Report	Jason Byrne 24' (pen.)	Referee: Ian Stokes (Dublin)

==== Final league table ====
Pos	Team	Pld	W	D	L	GF	GA	GD	Pts	Qualification or relegation
1	Shelbourne (C)	36	19	12	5	52	28	+24	69	Qualification to Champions League first qualifying round
2	Bohemians	36	18	10	8	58	37	+21	64	Qualification to UEFA Cup first qualifying round
3	Cork City	36	13	14	9	43	33	+10	53	Qualification to Intertoto Cup first round
4	Longford Town	36	12	12	12	46	44	+2	48	Qualification to UEFA Cup first qualifying round (Note: Longford Town qualified for the UEFA Cup first qualifying round after winning the 2003 FAI Cup.)
5	St Patrick's Athletic	36	10	16	10	48	48	0	46	

(C) Champions

==== League Results summary ====
Overall								Home						Away					
Pld	W	D	L	GF	GA	GD	Pts	W	D	L	GF	GA	GD	W	D	L	GF	GA	GD
36	19	12	5	52	28	+24	69	10	6	2	30	17	+13	9	6	3	22	11	+11

Last updated: 28 November 2003.
Source: League of Ireland Premier Division Fixtures

==== League Form/Results by Round ====
Round	1	2	3	4	5	6	7	8	9	10	11	12	13	14	15	16	17	18	19	20	21	22	23	24	25	26	27	28	29	30	31	32	33	34	35	36
Ground	A	H	H	A	H	A	H	A	H	H	A	A	H	A	H	H	A	H	H	A	H	A	A	A	H	H	A	A	H	A	H	A	H	H	A	A
Result	W	W	W	D	D	W	D	D	W	D	L	W	W	D	D	D	W	W	W	W	W	L	W	D	L	W	D	W	L	W	D	W	W	W	L	D

Updated to match(es) played on 28 November 2003. Source: League of Ireland Premier Division Fixtures
A = Away; H = Home; W = Win; D = Draw; L = Loss

=== UEFA Cup ===
==== Qualifying round ====
14 August 2003	NK Olimpija Ljubljana	1 – 0	Shelbourne	Bežigrad Stadium, Ljubljana
19.00 IST	Nedim Jusufbegovic 73'	Report		Referee: Krzysztof Slupik (Poland)

28 August 2003	Shelbourne	2 – 3	NK Olimpija Ljubljana	Tolka Park, Dublin
19.45 IST	Ollie Cahill 14'; Jason Byrne 90'	Report	Nedim Jusufbegovic 8'; Anton Žlogar 45'; Marko Kmetec 56'	Referee: Gylfi Orrasson (Iceland)

Olimpija Ljubljana won 4 - 2 on aggregate

=== FAI Cup ===
==== Second round ====
25 July 2003	Cork City	0 – 2	Shelbourne	Turners Cross, Cork
19.45 IST		Report	Jason Byrne 4' 72'	Referee: John McDermott (Dublin)

==== Third round ====
17 August 2003	Sligo Rovers	0 – 0	Shelbourne	The Showgrounds, Sligo
19.00 IST		Report		Referee: Alan Kelly (Cork)

===== Replay =====
21 August 2003	Shelbourne	2 – 3 (a.e.t.)	Sligo Rovers	Tolka Park, Dublin
19.45 IST	Ollie Cahill 43'; Jason Byrne 90+5' (pen.); Dave Rogers (red card) 35'	Report	Ollie Keogh 15'; John Gaffney 32'; Steve Feeney 104'; Michael McNamara (red card) 90+4'	Referee: Dave McKeon (Meath)

=== League of Ireland Cup ===
==== First round ====
28 April 2003	Shelbourne	2 – 3	Dublin City	Tolka Park, Dublin
19.45 IST	Ger Rowe 2'; Dessie Baker 51'	Report	Barry Burke 20' (pen.); Robbie Collins 74'; Graham Dunning 85'

12 May 2003	St. Patrick's Athletic	3 – 1	Shelbourne	Richmond Park, Dublin
19.45 IST	Michael Holt 17' 29'; Paul Marney 89'	Report	Ger Rowe 2'

===== Final group table =====
Pos	Team	Pld	W	D	L	GF	GA	GD	Pts	Qualification
1	St. Patrick's Athletic (Q)	2	2	0	0	5	1	+4	6	Qualified for eircom League Cup quarter-finals
2	Dublin City	2	1	0	1	3	4	−1	3	
3	Shelbourne	2	0	0	2	3	6	−3	0	

(Q) Qualified for the phase indicated

== 2003 season statistics ==
=== Player appearances/goals ===
As of 28 November 2003.

No.	Pos	Nat	Player	Total		Premier Division		UEFA Cup		FAI Cup		League Cup	
No.	Pos	Nat	Player	Apps	Goals	Apps	Goals	Apps	Goals	Apps	Goals	Apps	Goals
	FW	(Republic of Ireland) IRL	Dessie Baker	10	1	7	0	1	0	1	0	1	1
	MF	(Republic of Ireland) IRL	Richie Baker	34	3	29	3	2	0	3	0	0	0
	GK	(Scotland) SCO	Chris Bennion	2	0	0	0	0	0	0	0	2	0
	FW	(Republic of Ireland) IRL	Jason Byrne	39	25	34	21	2	1	3	3	0	0
	DF	(Republic of Ireland) IRL	Philip Byrne	2	0	0	0	0	0	0	0	2	0
	MF	(Republic of Ireland) IRL	Stuart Byrne	28	2	25	2	2	0	1	0	0	0
	MF	(Republic of Ireland) IRL	Ollie Cahill	42	5	36	3	2	1	3	1	1	0
	GK	(Republic of Ireland) IRL	Morgan Cranley	1	0	0	0	0	0	0	0	1	0
	MF	(Republic of Ireland) IRL	Jim Crawford	36	3	31	3	2	0	3	0	0	0
	DF	(Republic of Ireland) IRL	David Crawley	28	1	23	1	2	0	3	0	0	0
	DF	(Republic of Ireland) IRL	Kevin Doherty	31	0	26	0	2	0	3	0	0	0
	DF	(Republic of Ireland) IRL	Derek Dunne	2	0	0	0	0	0	0	0	2	0
	DF	(Republic of Ireland) IRL	Jim Gannon	9	1	9	1	0	0	0	0	0	0
	FW	(Republic of Ireland) IRL	Stephen Geoghegan	27	4	23	4	1	0	3	0	0	0
	DF	(Wales) WAL	Jamie Harris	20	6	20	6	0	0	0	0	0	0
	DF	(Republic of Ireland) IRL	Owen Heary	40	0	35	0	2	0	3	0	0	0
	MF	(Republic of Ireland) IRL	Wes Hoolahan	36	2	31	2	2	0	2	0	1	0
	FW	(Republic of Ireland) IRL	Alan Kinsella	3	0	1	0	0	0	0	0	2	0
	FW	(Republic of Ireland) IRL	Alan Lee	2	0	0	0	0	0	0	0	2	0
	FW	(Republic of Ireland) IRL	Ger McCarthy	29	2	23	2	1	0	3	0	2	0
	DF	(Republic of Ireland) IRL	Tony McCarthy	25	0	23	0	1	0	0	0	1	0
	MF	(Republic of Ireland) IRL	Thomas Morgan	32	0	28	0	1	0	3	0	0	0
	FW	(Republic of Ireland) IRL	Alan Murphy	2	0	0	0	0	0	0	0	2	0
	MF	(Republic of Ireland) IRL	Stephen Murphy	1	0	0	0	0	0	0	0	1	0
	DF	(Republic of Ireland) IRL	Stephen Murtagh	1	0	0	0	0	0	0	0	1	0
	MF	(England) ENG	Scott Oakes	5	0	3	0	0	0	0	0	2	0
	DF	(England) ENG	Dave Rogers	30	1	25	1	2	0	3	0	0	0
	FW	(Republic of Ireland) IRL	Ger Rowe	16	2	14	0	0	0	0	0	2	2
	DF	(Republic of Ireland) IRL	Ciarán Sharkey	1	0	0	0	0	0	0	0	1	0
	FW	(Republic of Ireland) IRL	Ray Whelehan	2	0	0	0	0	0	0	0	2	0
	GK	(Wales) WAL	Steve Williams	41	0	36	0	2	0	3	0	0	0

=== Top goalscorers ===
Position	Goalscorer	Total Goals	Premier Division	UEFA Cup	FAI Cup	League Cup
1	(Republic of Ireland) Jason Byrne	25	21	1	3	0
2	(Wales) Jamie Harris	6	6	0	0	0
3	(Republic of Ireland) Ollie Cahill	5	3	1	1	0
4	(Republic of Ireland) Stephen Geoghegan	4	4	0	0	0
5	(Republic of Ireland) Richie Baker	3	3	0	0	0
	(Republic of Ireland) Jim Crawford	3	3	0	0	0
7	(Republic of Ireland) Stuart Byrne	2	2	0	0	0
	(Republic of Ireland) Wes Hoolahan	2	2	0	0	0
	(Republic of Ireland) Ger McCarthy	2	2	0	0	0
	(Republic of Ireland) Ger Rowe	2	0	0	0	2
11	(Republic of Ireland) Dessie Baker	1	0	0	0	1
	(Republic of Ireland) David Crawley	1	1	0	0	0
	(Republic of Ireland) Jim Gannon	1	1	0	0	0
	(England) Dave Rogers	1	1	0	0	0
