= 2002–03 Shelbourne F.C. season =

Shelbourne
2002–03 season
- Chairman: Ollie Byrne
- Manager: Pat Fenlon
- Premier Division: 2nd
- UEFA Champions League: First Qualifying Round
- FAI Cup: Third round
- Top goalscorer: League: Stephen Geoghegan (8); All: Stuart Byrne (9); Stephen Geoghegan (9)
Home colours	Away colours

In the 2002–03 season, Shelbourne finished 2nd in the League of Ireland Premier Division.

== Managerial/backroom staff ==
Manager: Pat Fenlon

== 2002–03 squad members ==
Note: Flags indicate national team as defined under FIFA eligibility rules; some limited exceptions apply. Players may hold more than one non-FIFA nationality.

No.	Pos.	Nation	Player
—	GK	WAL	Steve Williams
—	GK	SCO	Chris Bennion
—	DF	IRL	Owen Heary (Captain)
—	DF	IRL	Jim Gannon
—	DF	IRL	Kevin Doherty
—	DF	IRL	Barry Prenderville
—	DF	IRL	Tony McCarthy
—	DF	IRL	David Crawley
—	DF	IRL	Clive Ross
—	MF	IRL	Richie Baker
—	MF	IRL	Stuart Byrne
—	MF	IRL	Jim Crawford
—	MF	IRL	Davy Byrne

No.	Pos.	Nation	Player
—	MF	IRL	Pat Fenlon
—	MF	IRL	Wes Hoolahan
—	MF	IRL	Ollie Cahill
—	FW	IRL	Stephen Geoghegan
—	FW	SCO	Mark Roberts
—	FW	ENG	Alex Nesovic
—	FW	ENG	Paul Beavers
—	FW	IRL	Tony Sheridan
—	FW	IRL	Trevor Molloy
—	FW	IRL	Dessie Baker
—	FW	IRL	Ger Rowe
—	FW	IRL	Alan Murphy
—	FW	USA	Kevin Jones

== Results/league tables ==
=== eircom League Premier Division ===
5 July 2002	Cork City	3 – 0	Shelbourne	Turners Cross, Cork
19.45 IST	George O'Callaghan 15'; John O'Flynn 44' 77'	Report	Trevor Molloy (red card) 49'	Referee: Hugh Byrne (Dublin)

11 July 2002	Shelbourne	3 – 3	Drogheda United	Tolka Park, Dublin
19.45 IST	Gary Cronin 6' (o.g.); Stuart Byrne 37'; Trevor Molloy 53'	Report	Derek Delaney 36' 43'; Stuart Taylor 69'	Referee: Hugo Whoriskey (Meath)

2 August 2002	UCD	1 – 3	Shelbourne	Belfield Park, Dublin
19.45 IST	Tony McDonnell 80'	Report	Stuart Byrne 45'; Tony McCarthy 58'; Stephen Geoghegan 69'	Referee: Declan Hanney (Dublin)

5 August 2002	Bray Wanderers	1 – 5	Shelbourne	Carlisle Grounds, Bray
14.00 IST	Jason Byrne 59'; Eddie Gormley (red card) 71'	Report	Jim Crawford 29'; Barry Prenderville 63'; David Crawley 71' (pen.); Stuart Byrne 83'; Mark Roberts 89'

9 August 2002	Shelbourne	1 – 2	St. Patrick's Athletic	Tolka Park, Dublin
19.45 IST	Ollie Cahill 79'	Report	Martin Russell 18' (pen.); Tony Bird 70'

23 August 2002	Shelbourne	3 – 0	Longford Town	Tolka Park, Dublin
19.45 IST	Stuart Byrne 36'; Ollie Cahill 47'; Jim Crawford 71'	Report		Referee: Dave McKeon (Meath)

2 September 2002	Shamrock Rovers	0 – 0	Shelbourne	Tolka Park, Dublin
19.45 IST		Report

13 September 2002	Shelbourne	1 – 2	Bohemians	Tolka Park, Dublin
19.45 IST	Richie Baker 80'	Report	Paul Keegan 29'; Glen Crowe 43'	Referee: Hugo Whoriskey (Meath)

19 September 2002	Derry City	1 – 0	Shelbourne	Brandywell Stadium, Derry
19.45 IST	Gareth McGlynn 33'	Report

27 September 2002	Shelbourne	2 – 1	Cork City	Tolka Park, Dublin
19.45 IST	Jim Gannon 58'; Stephen Geoghegan 88'	Report	John O'Flynn 45'	Referee: John Feighery (Dublin)

4 October 2002	Drogheda United	0 – 3	Shelbourne	o2 Park, Drogheda
20.00 IST	Declan O'Brien (penalty missed) 90+1' (pen.)	Report	Mark Roberts 33'; Barry Prenderville 55'; David Crawley 83' (pen.); Stephen Geoghegan (penalty missed) 73' (pen.)	Referee: Pat Whelan (Dublin)

11 October 2002	St. Patrick's Athletic	2 – 2	Shelbourne	Richmond Park, Dublin
19.45 IST	Paul Marney 30'; Colm Foley 53'	Report	Stephen Geoghegan 31' 86'	Referee: Paul McKeon (Dublin)

18 October 2002	Shelbourne	2 – 1	UCD	Tolka Park, Dublin
19.45 IST	Mark Roberts 36'; Davy Byrne 37'	Report	Robbie Doyle 27'	Referee: Hugo Whoriskey (Meath)

26 October 2002	Longford Town	0 – 2	Shelbourne	Flancare Park, Longford
19.30 IST	Eric Lavine (red card) 14'	Report	Ollie Cahill 52'; Mark Roberts 64'	Referee: Damien Hancock (Dublin)

1 November 2002	Shelbourne	0 – 1	Shamrock Rovers	Tolka Park, Dublin
19.45 GMT		Report	Shane Robinson 59'	Referee: Hugh Byrne (Dublin)

8 November 2002	Bohemians	1 – 2	Shelbourne	Dalymount Park, Dublin
20.10 GMT	Glen Crowe 90+5'	Report	David Crawley 19' (pen.); Stephen Geoghegan 85'	Referee: John Feighrey (Dublin)

22 November 2002	Bray Wanderers	1 – 2	Shelbourne	Carlisle Grounds, Bray
19.45 GMT	Graham O'Hanlon 52'	Report	Stuart Byrne 22'; Paul Beavers 84'	Referee: Damien Hancock (Dublin)

29 November 2002	Cork City	2 – 1	Shelbourne	Turners Cross, Cork
19.45 GMT	George O'Callaghan 16'; John O'Flynn 47' (pen.)	Report	Stephen Geoghegan 23'; Jim Gannon (red card) 60'	Referee: Paul McKeon (Dublin)

2 December 2002	Shelbourne	2 – 0	Derry City	Tolka Park, Dublin
20.05 GMT	Mark Roberts 41'; Stuart Byrne 44'	Report		Referee: Anthony Buttimer (Cork)

6 December 2002	Shelbourne	2 – 0	St. Patrick's Athletic	Tolka Park, Dublin
19.45 GMT	Jim Gannon 81'; Stephen Geoghegan 90'	Report		Referee: Damien Hancock (Dublin)

13 December 2002	UCD	0 – 2	Shelbourne	Belfield Park, Dublin
19.45 GMT		Report	Stephen Geoghegan 12'; Alex Nesovic 54'

22 December 2002	Shamrock Rovers	0 – 1	Shelbourne	Richmond Park, Dublin
15.00 GMT		Report	Mark Roberts 56'	Referee: Alan Kelly (Cork)

2 January 2003	Derry City	0 – 1	Shelbourne	Brandywell Stadium, Derry
19.45 GMT		Report	Ollie Cahill 33'	Referee: Ian Stokes (Dublin)

7 January 2003	Shelbourne	1 – 1	Longford Town	Tolka Park, Dublin
19.45 GMT	Jim Gannon 41'	Report	Sean Francis 13'

12 January 2003	Shelbourne	0 – 1	Bohemians	Tolka Park, Dublin
16.00 GMT		Report	Bobby Ryan 89'

20 January 2003	Shelbourne	0 – 1	Drogheda United	Tolka Park, Dublin
19.45 GMT		Report	Andy Myler 53' (pen.); Declan O'Brien (red card) 47'	Referee: Jim O'Neill (Waterford)

24 January 2003	Shelbourne	3 – 1	Bray Wanderers	Tolka Park, Dublin
19.45 GMT	Wes Charles 4' (o.g.); Jim Gannon 73'; Ollie Cahill 82'	Report	Philip Keogh 83'

==== Final league table ====
Pos	Team	Pld	W	D	L	GF	GA	GD	Pts	Qualification or relegation
1	Bohemians (C)	27	15	9	3	47	27	+20	54	Qualification to Champions League first qualifying round
2	Shelbourne	27	15	4	8	44	26	+18	49	Qualification to UEFA Cup qualifying round
3	Shamrock Rovers	27	12	7	8	42	29	+13	43	Qualification to Intertoto Cup first round
4	Cork City	27	11	6	10	37	34	+3	39	
5	Longford Town (Note: Longford Town had 9 points deducted for fielding Avery John against Cork City, Bohemians and Bray Wanderers but this decision was revoked on appeal.)	27	8	11	8	25	29	−4	35	

Source: www.rsssf.com
(C) Champions

==== League Results summary ====
Overall								Home						Away					
Pld	W	D	L	GF	GA	GD	Pts	W	D	L	GF	GA	GD	W	D	L	GF	GA	GD
27	15	4	8	44	26	+18	49	6	2	5	20	14	+6	9	2	3	24	12	+12

Last updated: 24 January 2003.
Source: eircom League Premier Division Fixtures

==== League Form/Results by Round ====
Round	1	2	3	4	5	6	7	8	9	10	11	12	13	14	15	16	17	18	19	20	21	22	23	24	25	26	27
Ground	A	H	A	A	H	H	A	H	A	H	A	A	H	A	H	A	A	A	H	H	A	A	A	H	H	H	H
Result	L	D	W	W	L	W	D	L	L	W	W	D	W	W	L	W	W	L	W	W	W	W	W	D	L	L	W

Updated to match(es) played on 24 January 2003. Source: eircom League Premier Division Fixtures
A = Away; H = Home; W = Win; D = Draw; L = Loss

=== UEFA Champions League ===
==== First Qualifying Round ====
17 July 2002	Hibernians	2 – 2	Shelbourne	Ta' Qali Stadium, Malta
18.30 IST	Ndubisi Chukunyere 7'; Adrian Pulis 37'	Report	Stuart Byrne 6'; Jim Gannon 67'	Referee: Eric Blareau (Belgium)

24 July 2002	Shelbourne	0 – 1	Hibernians	Tolka Park, Dublin
20.05 IST		Report	Ndubisi Chukunyere 90'	Referee: Vitaliy Godulyan (Ukraine)

Hibernians won 3 – 2 on aggregate

=== FAI Cup ===
==== Second round ====
27 July 2002	Shelbourne	8 – 0	Rockmount	Tolka Park, Dublin
19.00 IST	Trevor Molloy 18'; Richie Baker 32' 45'; Ollie Cahill 46'; Stuart Byrne 53'; Wes Hoolahan 59'; Stephen Geoghegan 67'; Barry Prenderville 68'	Report	Pat Keane (red card) 80'	Referee: John Feighery (Dublin)

==== Third round ====
16 August 2002	St. Patrick's Athletic	2 – 1	Shelbourne	Richmond Park, Dublin
19.45 IST	Martin Russell 33' (pen.); Paul Osam 90'	Report	Stuart Byrne 87'

== 2002–03 season statistics ==
=== Player appearances/goals ===
As of 24 January 2003.

No.	Pos	Nat	Player	Total		Premier Division		Champions Lge		FAI Cup	
No.	Pos	Nat	Player	Apps	Goals	Apps	Goals	Apps	Goals	Apps	Goals
	FW	(Republic of Ireland) IRL	Dessie Baker	2	0	2	0	0	0	0	0
	MF	(Republic of Ireland) IRL	Richie Baker	31	3	27	1	2	0	2	2
	FW	(England) ENG	Paul Beavers	8	1	8	1	0	0	0	0
	GK	(Scotland) SCO	Chris Bennion	10	0	8	0	0	0	2	0
	MF	(Republic of Ireland) IRL	Davy Byrne	20	1	19	1	0	0	1	0
	MF	(Republic of Ireland) IRL	Stuart Byrne	28	9	24	6	2	1	2	2
	MF	(Republic of Ireland) IRL	Ollie Cahill	30	6	26	5	2	0	2	1
	GK	(Republic of Ireland) IRL	Morgan Cranley	0	0	0	0	0	0	0	0
	MF	(Republic of Ireland) IRL	Jim Crawford	20	2	18	2	0	0	2	0
	DF	(Republic of Ireland) IRL	David Crawley	31	3	27	3	2	0	2	0
	DF	(Republic of Ireland) IRL	Kevin Doherty	18	0	17	0	1	0	0	0
	MF	(Republic of Ireland) IRL	Pat Fenlon	3	0	2	0	0	0	1	0
	DF	(Republic of Ireland) IRL	Jim Gannon	25	5	22	4	2	1	1	0
	FW	(Republic of Ireland) IRL	Stephen Geoghegan	24	9	23	8	0	0	1	1
	DF	(Republic of Ireland) IRL	Owen Heary	30	0	26	0	2	0	2	0
	MF	(Republic of Ireland) IRL	Wes Hoolahan	26	1	23	0	1	0	2	1
	FW	(United States) USA	Kevin Jones	1	0	1	0	0	0	0	0
	DF	(Republic of Ireland) IRL	Tony McCarthy	15	1	11	1	2	0	2	0
	FW	(Republic of Ireland) IRL	Trevor Molloy	5	2	2	1	2	0	1	1
	FW	(Republic of Ireland) IRL	Alan Murphy	2	0	2	0	0	0	0	0
	FW	(England) ENG	Alex Nesovic	6	1	6	1	0	0	0	0
	DF	(Republic of Ireland) IRL	Barry Prenderville	18	3	14	2	2	0	2	1
	FW	(Scotland) SCO	Mark Roberts	27	6	23	6	2	0	2	0
	DF	(Republic of Ireland) IRL	Clive Ross	3	0	2	0	0	0	1	0
	FW	(Republic of Ireland) IRL	Ger Rowe	1	0	1	0	0	0	0	0
	FW	(Republic of Ireland) IRL	Tony Sheridan	4	0	4	0	0	0	0	0
	GK	(Wales) WAL	Steve Williams	21	0	19	0	2	0	0	0

=== Top goalscorers ===
Position	Goalscorer	Total Goals	Premier Division	Champions Lge	FAI Cup
1	(Republic of Ireland) Stuart Byrne	9	6	1	2
	(Republic of Ireland) Stephen Geoghegan	9	8	0	1
3	(Republic of Ireland) Ollie Cahill	6	5	0	1
	(Scotland) Mark Roberts	6	6	0	0
5	(Republic of Ireland) Jim Gannon	5	4	1	0
6	(Republic of Ireland) Richie Baker	3	1	0	2
	(Republic of Ireland) David Crawley	3	3	0	0
	(Republic of Ireland) Barry Prenderville	3	2	0	1
9	(Republic of Ireland) Jim Crawford	2	2	0	0
	(Republic of Ireland) Trevor Molloy	2	1	0	1
11	(England) Paul Beavers	1	1	0	0
	(Republic of Ireland) Davy Byrne	1	1	0	0
	(Republic of Ireland) Wes Hoolahan	1	0	0	1
	(Republic of Ireland) Tony McCarthy	1	1	0	0
	(England) Alex Nesovic	1	1	0	0
