= Kevin Doherty (footballer) =

Association football player

Personal information
- Date of birth: 18 April 1980 (age 46)
- Place of birth: Dublin, Ireland
- Height: 6 ft 4 in (1.93 m)
- Position: Centre-back

Team information
- Current team: Drogheda United (manager)

Youth career
- 1986–1994: St. Martins Boys Club
- 1994–1998: Home Farm Everton
- 1998–2001: Liverpool

Senior career*
Years	Team	Apps	(Gls)
2001–2005	Shelbourne	73	(1)
2005	→ Waterford United (loan)	19	(1)
2006–2007	Longford Town	42	(1)
2008	Bray Wanderers	26	(0)
2009	Shelbourne	19	(1)
Total		179	(4)

International career
1998–1999	Republic of Ireland U18	4	(0)

Managerial career
- 2013–2014: Shelbourne (assistant)
- 2014–2016: Shelbourne
- 2017–2021: Drogheda United (assistant)
- 2021–: Drogheda United
- * Club domestic league appearances and goals

Kevin Doherty (born 18 April 1980) is an Irish association football coach and former professional player who is the manager of League of Ireland Premier Division club Drogheda United. He was the manager of Shelbourne from December 2014 until June 2016. As a player Doherty was a powerful centre-back, who was named FAI School's International Player of the Year in 1998. He was transferred from Home Farm Everton to Liverpool FC in the same year and played for the Premier League club's youth and reserve teams, as well as for the Republic of Ireland under-18 team. A broken femur suffered at the end of his first season with Liverpool was the first of several injuries which beset Doherty throughout his playing career.

Doherty never played for Liverpool's first team and was released on the expiry of his contract in 2001, joining League of Ireland club Shelbourne. Despite further injury problems, he became an important player for Shels; collecting three Premier Division winner's medals and selection to the 2002–03 Professional Footballers' Association of Ireland (PFAI) Team of the Season. After losing his place in the team during his fourth season at the club, Doherty was put on the transfer list ahead of the 2005 campaign. He joined Waterford United for 2005, then spent 2006 and 2007 with Longford Town and 2008 with Bray Wanderers. In 2009, he returned to Shelbourne, who had been demoted for financial reasons and were languishing in the First Division.

After retiring from playing in 2010, Doherty began taking his coaching qualifications and working with youth teams at his first club Home Farm. In 2011, he began coaching Shelbourne's youth team, moving up to work with the adult first team in 2013. After a spell as interim manager during May 2013, he was appointed the club's permanent manager for the 2015 season.

Following a lukewarm first season in charge, fan favourite Doherty resigned on 25 June 2016 following a poor run of form for the Reds, culminating in a 2–0 defeat at home to Waterford United. He was replaced four days later by former teammate Owen Heary.

Doherty is working as manager at Drogheda United

== Early life and non-League career ==
Doherty was born in Artane, Dublin. He attended Scoil Chiaráin, Donnycarney and St. Joseph's Secondary C.B.S., Fairview. From the ages of 6–13, he played his football for the now-defunct St. Martin's Boys Club, who played their home games in Donnycarney Park (known locally as "Maypark"). At the age of 14, he was approached to join Home Farm, one of the leading schoolboy clubs in the country. Doherty quickly found success by winning the All Ireland Cup in his first season. In 1998, Doherty won the FAI School's International Player of the Year.

== Club career ==
Doherty's play with Home Farm drew the attention of Liverpool FC. Liverpool Head of Youth Steve Heighway flew to Dublin to complete the signing on a three-year contract. He went on to play three seasons with Liverpool. In a reserve team match against Wrexham in September 1998 Doherty was named coach Sammy Lee's man of the match, despite Robbie Fowler scoring six goals. In May 1999, Doherty's progress was derailed by a broken femur sustained while playing for Ireland Under-18s against PSV Eindhoven's youth team. Though he recovered, his further career at Liverpool was hampered by the injury.

In July 2001, Doherty returned to Irish football signing with Shelbourne, under his former Home Farm manager Dermot Keely. He had been released by Liverpool and chose Shelbourne over competing offers from English clubs Grimsby Town and Crewe Alexandra. Valuing the opportunity to play competitive first-team football, he hoped to learn from experienced teammates Tony McCarthy, Jim Gannon and Peter Hutton. Doherty remained with Shelbourne for four years making more than 70 appearances. During his time at Shelbourne the team won the league championship three times. Doherty's early good form with Shelbourne saw him named League of Ireland Player of the Month in January 2002 and also earned him a call up to the national Under-21 team. But he missed the end of the 2001–02 season with a broken rib sustained in February 2002. He started Shelbourne's qualifying round UEFA Champions League match against Hibernians FC of Malta in July 2002, only to re-injure his ribs and miss the second leg defeat.

Doherty was briefly dropped from the team at the beginning of the 2002–03 season, after a poor performance in a 3–0 defeat by Cork City and an on-field argument with Shelbourne's new player-manager Pat Fenlon. He recovered to take his place in the Professional Footballers' Association of Ireland (PFAI) Team of the Season. In the 2003 season it was reported that in-form Doherty had extended his contract with Shelbourne and had bought a new house in Dublin. Two separate calf injuries kept him out for three months in 2004, reducing his role in the squad and leaving him hoping for a "cameo" in Shelbourne's European campaign. In December 2004 Doherty was transfer listed by the club, with one year of his contract remaining. He rejected an offer from Norwegian Tippeligaen club FK Lyn.

Eventually, Doherty was loaned to Waterford United for the 2005 season, where he made 19 appearances. After a change in management, Waterford attempted to return Doherty to Shelbourne in mid-season. But Shelbourne disagreed and a tribunal ruled in their favour. On his return to Shelbourne in January 2006, he was released. Subsequently, he went on to play for Longford Town for two seasons, and then Bray Wanderers for another year. He played for Longford in their 1–0 2007 FAI Cup Final defeat by Cork City. In his last stint as a player, he returned to Shelbourne for the 2009 season, making 16 appearances. Doherty retired from playing in 2010 due to persistent health issues.

== International career ==
In 1998 and 1999 Doherty played for the Republic of Ireland under-18 team, coached by Brian Kerr. A broken leg suffered before the tournament ruled Doherty out of the 1999 UEFA European Under-18 Championship in Sweden. He was replaced in Ireland's squad by Clive Clarke. In January 2002, Don Givens called up Doherty to a training camp for the Republic of Ireland under-21 team at Bisham Abbey. He was hopeful of selection for the Toulon Tournament that May, but suffered a broken rib in February 2002.

== Managerial career ==
Doherty's first appointment as a coach was with his old Home Farm club, where he coached youth in the Dublin and District Schoolboys League. In 2011, Doherty coached the Shelbourne U-19 team during its inaugural season. In May 2013 Doherty was put in temporary charge of Shelbourne's first team when Alan Mathews resigned. For the remainder of the 2013 Shelbourne season, Doherty was the assistant to incoming manager John McDonnell. At the end of the 2014 campaign, McDonnell left to manage Drogheda United and Doherty was promoted to be Shelbourne's manager.

Doherty left his managerial role at Shelbourne in June 2016. He joined Longford Town as a coach in September 2016. He departed the midland's club in May 2017.

In December 2017, Doherty was appointed as assistant manager at Drogheda United. After 4 years as assistant, he was named as manager of the club on 2 December 2021 on a three-year contract following manager Tim Clancy's departure to St Patrick's Athletic. On 7 November 2026, he led Drogheda back down to the League of Ireland First Division after they were defeated 2–1 by UCD in the Promotion/Relegation Playoff.

== Managerial statistics ==
As of match played on 7 November 2026

Managerial record by team and tenure
Team	Nat.	From	To	Record							
Team	Nat.	From	To	G	W	D	L	GF	GA	GD	Win %
Shelbourne	(Republic of Ireland)	24 May 2013	26 June 2016	50	21	7	22	67	68	−1	42.00
Drogheda United	(Republic of Ireland)	2 December 2021	Present	210	64	66	80	268	293	−25	30.48
Total				261	85	73	103	336	360	−24	32.57

== Honours ==
=== Player ===
Shelbourne

- League of Ireland: 2001–02, 2003, 2004

Individual

- FAI School's International Player of the Year: 1998

=== Manager ===
Drogheda United

- FAI Cup: 2024
