= Raffaele Cretaro =

Irish footballer (born 1981)

Personal information
- Date of birth: 15 October 1981 (age 45)
- Place of birth: Tubbercurry, Ireland
- Height: 1.65 m (5 ft 5 in)
- Position: Striker

Team information
- Current team: Real Tubber

Youth career
- 1990–2000: Real Tubber

Senior career*
Years	Team	Apps	(Gls)
2000–2005	Sligo Rovers	145	(13)
2006	Galway United	24	(3)
2007–2009	Sligo Rovers	92	(22)
2010	Bohemians	25	(5)
2011–2018	Sligo Rovers	200	(31)
2019–2020	Finn Harps	40	(3)
2023–2024	Ballina Town	26	(11)
2024	Real Tubber	4	(4)
2025	Conn Rangers	3	(0)
2025–	Real Tubber	14	(6)
- * Club domestic league appearances and goals

Raffaele Cretaro (born 15 October 1981) is an Irish footballer who plays as a striker for his boyhood club Real Tubber. He holds the all-time appearances record for Sligo Rovers.

== Early life ==
Cretaro is a native of Tubbercurry, Ireland. He is of Italian descent. He joined local side Real Tubber as a youth player at under-10 level. After making the Sligo/Leitrim squads at under-16 and under-18 level, Cretaro was recommended to Sligo Rovers.

== Career ==
Cretaro started his career in 2000 with Irish side Sligo Rovers. He made his goal-scoring debut for Sligo in a 3–0 win over Monaghan United at Gortakeegan on 3 September 2000. Cretaro became a regular in the first team under Don O'Riordan and established himself as an attacking full-back who could be called upon to play in multiple positions. In 2005, due to injuries in the squad, Cretaro played the season at right-back as Sligo Rovers secured the First Division title under manager Sean Connor.

Despite being part of the Sligo team that won promotion to the Premier Division in 2005, Cretaro failed to agree terms on a full-time contract. Instead he signed a part-time deal with First Division team Galway United in February 2006. He started for Galway in an FAI Cup match against Athlone Town on 26 May 2006, winning a penalty for his side. He scored at home against Athlone Town on 3 September 2006. Although he missed two months due to a broken jaw, Cretaro still earned a place in the First Division Team of the Year having made 24 league appearances for the Tribesmen and scoring three times in all competitions.

Cretaro returned to Sligo Rovers in 2007 after new manager, Rob McDonald, expressed an interest in signing him. However, McDonald was sacked during pre-season and replaced as manager by Paul Cook. Cretaro credits Cook for instilling a belief in the side and, in 2008, the team finished fourth in the league and qualified for the 2009–10 Europa League. In 2009, Cretaro had one of his most successful seasons, scoring 21 goals in all competitions as well as playing in the FAI Cup final, which Sligo lost 1–2 to Sporting Fingal.

In 2010, he signed for defending champions Bohemians. On 13 July 2010, Cretaro appeared for Bohs in the 2010–11 UEFA Champions League. On 18 August 2010, he scored twice at home to Bray Wanderers. He scored five league goals in total before leaving the club at the end of the season as Bohemians entered a period of financial turmoil.

Cretaro returned to Sligo Rovers in January 2011 for his third stint at the club. In his first season back, he scored six times in 33 league appearances as Sligo finished runners-up to Shamrock Rovers in the Premier Division. Cretaro also won his first FAI Cup medal as Sligo defeated Shelbourne on penalties in the 2011 final, with Cretaro scoring the winning penalty. The following year, under Ian Baraclough, Cretaro won the 2012 League of Ireland Premier Division and scored two goals at home to St Patrick's Athletic as Sligo secured their first league title in 35 years. In 2013, he started the FAI Cup final as Sligo beat Drogheda United 3–2 at the Aviva Stadium.

Cretaro's 2014 season was hampered due to injury and he was limited to 13 appearances for Rovers in the league. He returned to fitness in 2015 under new manager Owen Heary, but made 27 league appearances without scoring. Instead, his goals came in cup competitions, scoring once against Cobh Wanderers in the FAI Cup and once in the EA Sports Cup against a Mayo League representative team. In 2016 he was back in goal-scoring form, getting ten league goals from 25 league appearances and also scoring once in the FAI Cup.

Altogether, he spent seventeen years with Sligo Rovers and, on 20 August 2018, Cretaro surpassed Tony Fagan as the club's record all-time league appearance holder. He joined newly promoted Finn Harps in 2019. In 2021, he retired from League of Ireland football.

While still playing at Sligo Rovers, Cretaro took up coaching with their under-19s team in 2017. In June 2023, Cretaro was announced as the under-15s coach with Mayo F.C.

== Style of play ==
Cretaro made his breakthrough as a utility player and has deputised in every position bar goalkeeper. He has mainly played as a striker but can also operate as a midfielder or a full-back.

== Personal life ==
Cretaro is the brother of Irish hurler Fabio Cretaro.

== Career statistics ==
=== Club ===
Appearances and goals by club, season and competition
Club	Season	League			FAI Cup		League Cup (Note: Includes League of Ireland Cup)		Europe		Other		Total	
Club	Season	Division	Apps	Goals	Apps	Goals	Apps	Goals	Apps	Goals	Apps	Goals	Apps	Goals
Sligo Rovers	2000–01	LOI First Division	25	1	1	0	3	0	—		—		29	1
Sligo Rovers	2001–02	LOI First Division	28	3	3	1	2	0	—		—		33	4
Sligo Rovers	2002–03	LOI First Division	18	3	2	0	0	0	—		5 (Note: Appearances in LOI First Division Cup)	0	25	3
Sligo Rovers	2003	LOI First Division	25	1	4	0	2	2	—		—		31	3
Sligo Rovers	2004	LOI First Division	18	4	0	0	1	0	—		—		19	4
Sligo Rovers	2005	LOI First Division	31	1	4	0	1	0	—		—		36	1
Sligo Rovers	Total		145	13	14	1	9	2	—		5	0	173	16
Galway United	2006	LOI First Division	24	3	1	0	0	0	—		—		25	3
Sligo Rovers	2007	LOI Premier Division	30	1	2	0	0	0	—		—		32	1
Sligo Rovers	2008	LOI Premier Division	31	6	1	0	1	0	—		—		33	6
Sligo Rovers	2009	LOI Premier Division	31	15	7	4	3	1	2 (Note: Appearances in 2009–10 UEFA Europa League)	1	—		43	21
Sligo Rovers	Total		92	22	10	4	4	1	2	1	—		108	28
Bohemians	2010	LOI Premier Division	25* (Note: extratime.ie lists 24 appearances, finalwhistle.ie lists 25 appearances)	5	2	1	1	0	1 (Note: Appearances in 2010–11 UEFA Champions League)	0	2 (Note: Appearances in Setanta Sports Cup)	1	31	7
Sligo Rovers	2011	LOI Premier Division	33	6	6	1	3	1	2 (Note: Appearance(s) in 2011–12 UEFA Europa League)	0	3 (Note: Appearances in Setanta Sports Cup)	1	47	9
Sligo Rovers	2012	LOI Premier Division	28	6	1	0	3	2	1 (Note: Appearance(s) in 2012–13 UEFA Europa League)	0	3	0	36	8
Sligo Rovers	2013	LOI Premier Division	21	4	5	1	2	0	1 (Note: Appearance(s) in 2013–14 UEFA Champions League)	0	3	1	32	6
Sligo Rovers	2014	LOI Premier Division	13	0	1	0	0	0	2 (Note: Appearance(s) in 2014–15 UEFA Europa League)	0	2	0	18	0
Sligo Rovers	2015	LOI Premier Division	27	0	3	1	2	1	—		—		32	2
Sligo Rovers	2016	LOI Premier Division	25	10	2	1	1	0	—		—		28	11
Sligo Rovers	2017	LOI Premier Division	28	2	1	0	1	0	—		1 (Note: Appearance in 2017–18 Scottish Challenge Cup)	0	31	2
Sligo Rovers	2018	LOI Premier Division	25	3	1	0	3	0	—		1 (Note: Appearance in 2018–19 Scottish Challenge Cup)	0	30	3
Sligo Rovers	Total		200	31	20	4	15	4	6	0	13	2	254	41

*extratime cites 24 appearances, finalwhistle cites 25 appearances

== Honours ==
Sligo Rovers

- League of Ireland Premier Division: 2012
- FAI Cup: 2011, 2013
- League of Ireland First Division: 2005
