= Chris Bennion =

Scottish footballer

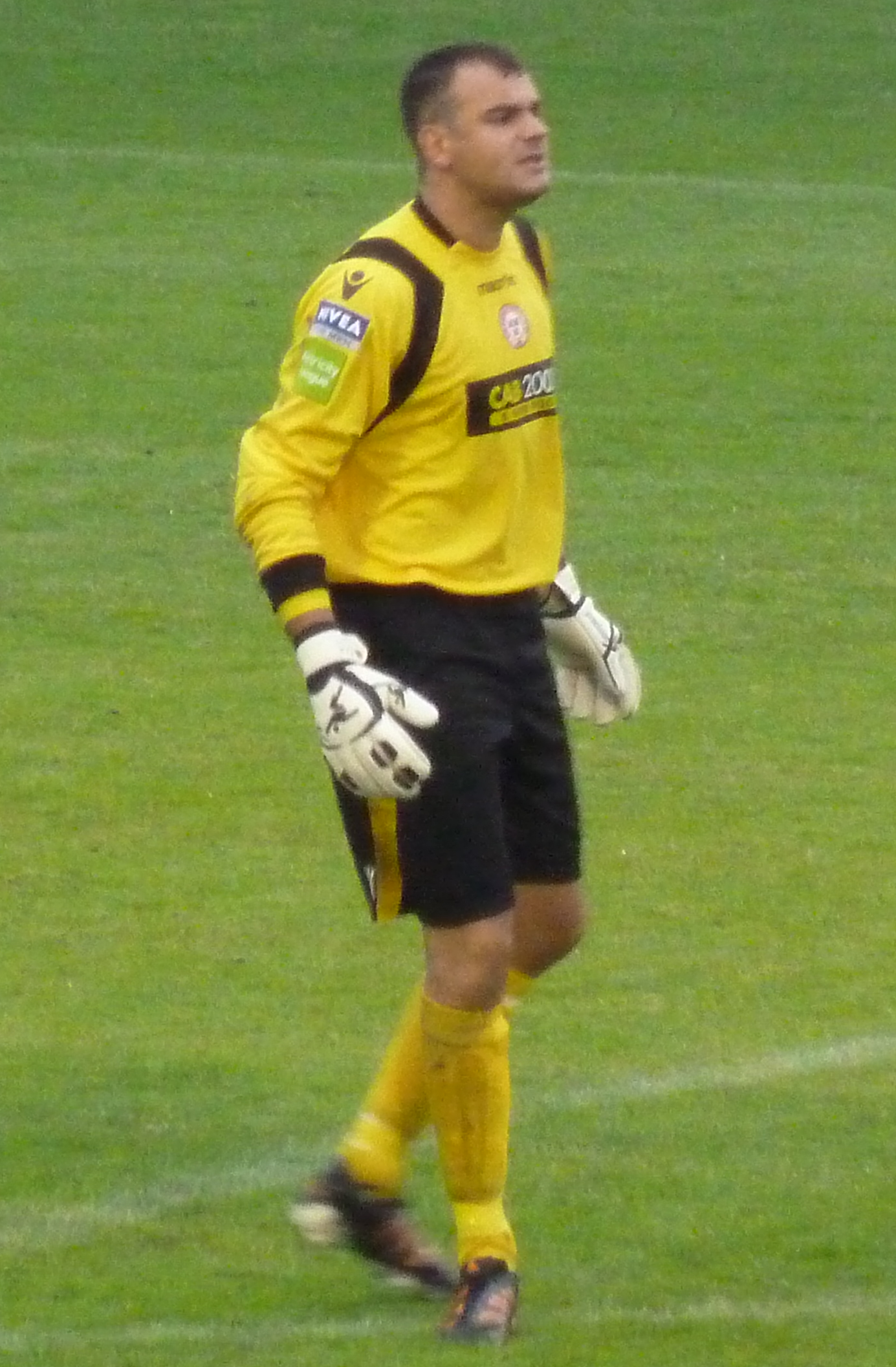

Personal information
- Full name: Christopher Bennion
- Date of birth: 30 August 1980 (age 46)
- Place of birth: Edinburgh, Scotland
- Position: Goalkeeper

Youth career
- Edinburgh Celtic
- Heart of Midlothian

Senior career*
Years	Team	Apps	(Gls)
1999–2002	Middlesbrough	1	(0)
2001–2002	→ Scunthorpe United (loan)	0	(0)
2002–2002	Scunthorpe United	0	(0)
2002–2003	Shelbourne	8	(0)
2004–2009	Dundalk	174	(0)
2010	Athlone Town	18	(0)
2010–2011	St. Patrick's Athletic	4	(0)
2012	Monaghan United	10	(0)
2012	Shelbourne	17	(0)
2013–2014	Longford Town	41	(0)
Total		272	(0)
- * Club domestic league appearances and goals

Chris Bennion (born 30 August 1980, in Edinburgh) is a Scottish former football player. He is currently 1st team Goalkeeping coach with Bohemian Football Club.

== Football career ==
Chris Bennion is a former professional goalkeeper, currently head goal keeping coach at league of Ireland club Bohemian. He began his career with Edinburgh Celtic as a youth and later joined the youth set up at Heart of Midlothian. In 1997, he joined English side Middlesbrough but made just one first team appearance and was loaned out to Scunthorpe United during his time at the Riverside Stadium. In 2002, he signed for League of Ireland side Shelbourne but was second choice keeper at Tolka Park. In 2004, he signed for Dundalk. He is a Scottish former schoolboys' international.

=== Middlesbrough ===
Bennion signed for Middlesbrough in 1997 and signed professional contract in 1999. However, he made just one first team appearance in September 2000 against Macclesfield Town in the first leg of the League Cup Second Round. Middlesbrough won the game 2–1 thanks to two late goals from Noel Whelan and Mark Summerbell at the Riverside Stadium. He was fourth choice keeper at the club behind Mark Schwarzer, Mark Crossley and Marlon Beresford. He was then loaned out to Scunthorpe United due to his lack of first team action.

=== Scunthorpe United ===
In September 2001, Bennion was loaned out to Scunthorpe United as cover for Tommy Evans. He did not make one single appearance for the Third Division side, however in March 2002 his loan deal from Middlesbrough was made permanent as he signed on a free transfer. Just one month later in April 2002, he left Glanford Park for League of Ireland side Shelbourne on a free transfer.

=== Shelbourne ===
In April 2002, Bennion joined Shelbourne in seek of more first team chances. For the remainder of the 2001–02 season, Bennion was deputy to Welsh keeper Steve Williams. He made just 10 league appearances for Pat Fenlon's side and won a League of Ireland medal in 2003. He was second choice keeper at Tolka Park and moved to Dundalk in 2004 as a result of little first team action.

=== Dundalk ===
Bennion signed for League of Ireland First Division side Dundalk in March 2004. He chose the Lillywhites ahead of Premier Division side Longford Town because he wanted regular first team action. He made his debut against Sligo Rovers in March 2004 at Oriel Park. Dundalk won the match 1–0 thanks to a Stephen Geoghegan goal. He played nearly every game during the 2004 season which was a poor season for the club. He was a key member of the Dundalk side who won the League of Ireland First Division in 2008. After spending six seasons with Dundalk and making over 170 appearances for the club Chris left Dundalk after being dislodged as first team keeper by his fellow country man Peter Cherrie.

=== Athlone Town ===
On 7 December he joined League of Ireland First Division side Athlone Town as captain in the pursuit of first team football.

=== St Patrick's Athletic ===
On 13 July 2010 Bennion signed for League of Ireland Premier Division side St. Patrick's Athletic. His contract with Athlone Town was cancelled by mutual consent after he informed the club that terms were agreed between himself and Pete Mahon of St Patricks Athletic. Bennion made his St.Pat's début in a 1–0 loss to Dublin rivals Bohemians at Richmond Park, this turned out to be his only appearance of the 2010 season.

=== Monaghan United ===
On 20 December 2011 Bennion signed for Monaghan United as a replacement for Gabriel Sava. On 2 March he played his first competitive game in a nil all draw against his former club Dundalk. On 18 June 2012, the club announced their withdrawal from the League of Ireland and all of their playing staff were released by the club.

=== Return to Shelbourne ===
On 6 July Bennion rejoined Dublin club Shelbourne.

=== Longford Town ===
In December 2012 he joined League of Ireland First Division side Longford Town.

Bennion's competitive league debut came in a 5–0 win against Salthill Devon at the Drom in County Galway. The Scot conceded his first competitive goal a week later at home to Waterford United but his side recovered to a 2–1 win after Paudie Quinn's stunning opener for the visitors who were Waterford United.

He was a member of the Longford squad which lifted the 2014 League of Ireland First Division title. Bennion decided to retire at the end off the season and take up a role in coaching . His final appearance saw him save a penalty in Longford's 2–0 victory away to Finn Harps on 12 October 2014.

== Honours ==
Shelbourne

- League of Ireland Premier Division (1): 2003

Dundalk

- League of Ireland First Division (1): 2008

Longford Town

- League of Ireland First Division (1): 2014

St Patrick's Athletic

- Leinster Senior Cup (1): 2011
