= Jamie McKenzie (footballer, born 1986) =

Scottish footballer

Jamie MacKenzie
Personal information
- Full name: Jamie MacKenzie
- Date of birth: 8 May 1986 (age 40)
- Place of birth: Kirkcaldy, Scotland
- Position: Centre-back

Youth career
- 2004–2005: Hibernian

Senior career*
Years	Team	Apps	(Gls)
2005–2006	Montrose	16	(0)
2006–2008	Sligo Rovers	32	(0)
2008–2009	Aris Limassol	15	(1)
2010	Galway United	34	(0)
2011	Chalkanoras	0	(0)
2011–2020	Linlithgow Rose		
- * Club domestic league appearances and goals

Jamie MacKenzie (born 8 May 1986) is a Scottish footballer.

== Career ==
MacKenzie started his career with Scottish Premier League side Hibernian, but was released in 2005. He then played in the Scottish Football League for Montrose for a season before signing for Sligo Rovers in 2006. He was briefly appointed club captain following the departure of the previous captain Michael McNamara, who left Sligo to join the Sligo Gaelic Football team.

MacKenzie scored Sligo's opening goal of the 2008 season, but after 13 league appearances he moved to Aris Limassol during the mid-season summer transfer window.

On 17 February 2010 it was announced that he had completed a switch to Galway United. making his return to the League of Ireland.

After a second spell playing in Cyprus, McKenzie returned to Scotland and signed for Junior side Linlithgow Rose in November 2011.

McKenzie was called up to the Scotland Junior international squad in October 2012 for their fixture against the Republic of Ireland.
