= Jim Gannon =

Footballer and football manager

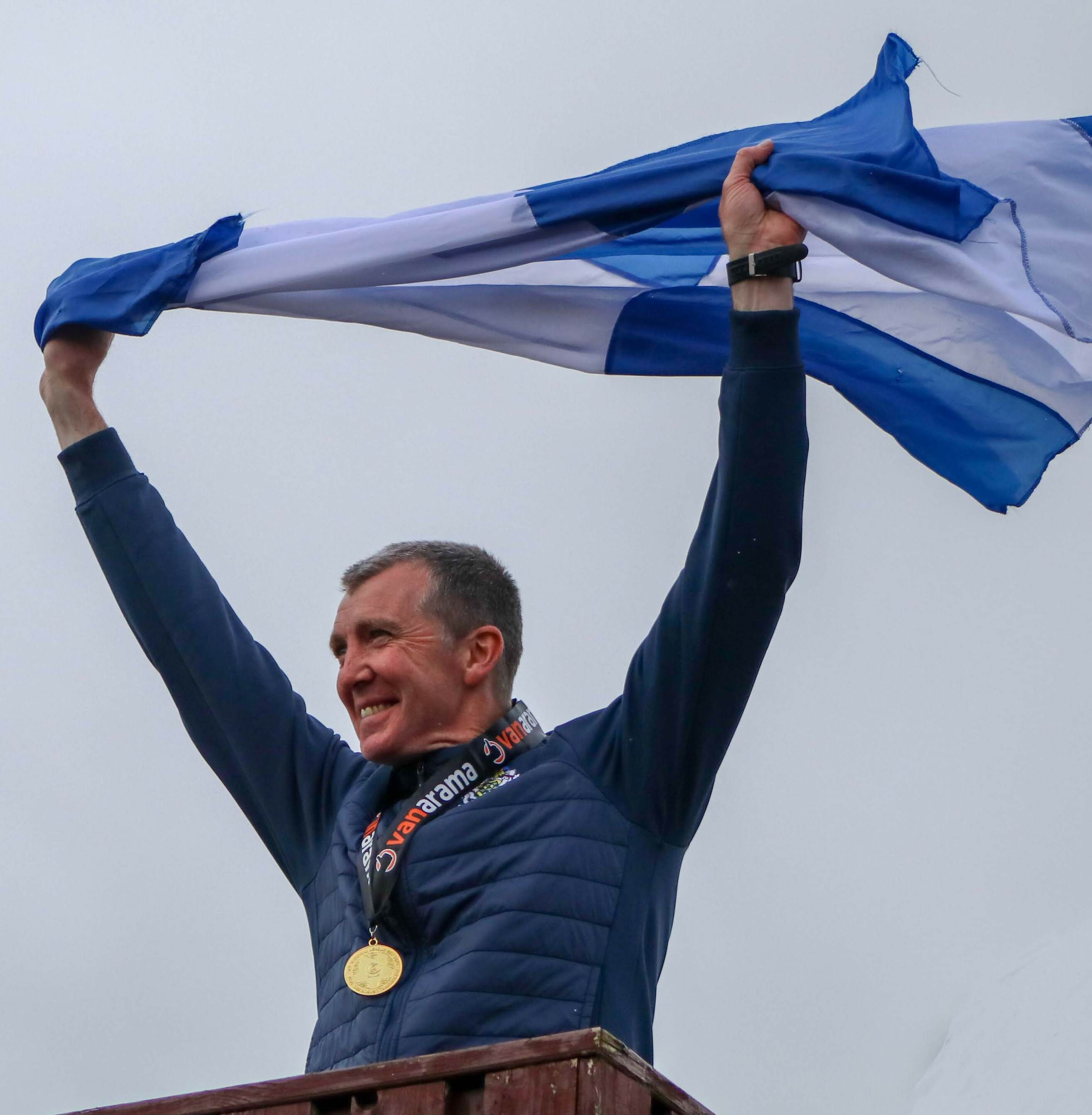
- Gannon celebrating winning the National League North as Stockport County manager in April 2019

Personal information
- Full name: James Paul Gannon
- Date of birth: 7 September 1968 (age 58)
- Place of birth: Southwark, London, England
- Height: 6 ft 2 in (1.88 m)
- Position: Centre-half

Senior career*
Years	Team	Apps	(Gls)
1987–1989	Dundalk	28	(1)
1989–1990	Sheffield United	0	(0)
1990	→ Halifax Town (loan)	2	(0)
1990–2000	Stockport County	364	(48)
1994	→ Notts County (loan)	2	(0)
2000–2001	Crewe Alexandra	7	(0)
2001–2003	Shelbourne	61	(9)
Total		464	(58)

Managerial career
- 2004–2005: Dundalk
- 2005–2009: Stockport County
- 2009: Motherwell
- 2010: Peterborough United
- 2011: Port Vale
- 2011–2013: Stockport County
- 2013–2016: Northwich Victoria
- 2016–2021: Stockport County
- 2021–2022: Hyde United
- * Club domestic league appearances and goals

James Paul Gannon (born 7 September 1968) is a professional football manager and former player. He started and finished his career as a player in Ireland but made most of his professional appearances in the English Football League at Stockport County, where supporters elected him as a member of the Hall of Fame.

Gannon began his playing career at Dundalk but moved to the English club Sheffield United in 1989. The next year, he transferred to Stockport County, following a short loan spell with Halifax Town. He spent the next ten years at Stockport, becoming one of the club's most loyal servants, and helped the club to second-place finishes in both the Second Division and Fourth Division, as well as two Football League Trophy finals. After leaving the club in 2000, he spent a season with Crewe Alexandra, before returning to Ireland with Shelbourne, winning two League of Ireland Premier Division titles in his three years there.

Starting a career in management, he took charge of his first club Dundalk in 2004. After a season in Ireland, he returned to Stockport County as manager. There, he led the club to promotion from League Two via the play-offs in 2008. Leading County to safety in League One despite a ten-point deduction for entering administration, he lost his job as part of a cost-cutting measure. Heading to Scottish Premier League side Motherwell, he managed the club in the Europa League, but left after just 25 games in charge. He took charge of Championship side Peterborough United in 2010. Still, he stayed at the struggling club for only two months, turning down a four-year contract. In January 2011, he was appointed manager of Port Vale but lasted just ten weeks. He returned to Stockport in November 2011 as the club's director of football and manager before being sacked in January 2013. He took charge at Northwich Victoria in December 2013. He spent just over two years with Northwich before returning to manage Stockport County for the third time in January 2016. He led the club to promotion as National League North champions at the end of the 2018–19 season. He left Stockport in January 2021 and took charge at Hyde United for a short spell eight months later.

== Early life ==
Gannon was born in Southwark, South London and moved with his family to Ireland at a young age. His father was a painter and decorator, and his mother was a cleaner. He considers himself to be a "working class Irish Catholic". He served in the Irish Army as a teenager and was asked to go on a training course for the Army Ranger Wing, though rejected the opportunity as it would mean giving up football. He had to buy himself out of the Army so as to play football professionally in England.

== Playing career ==
=== Early career ===
In 1987, he received his start in higher-level football with Irish club Dundalk. Whilst with the club he played in both the UEFA Champions League and UEFA Cup Winners' Cup, in a highly successful period in the club's history. During his spell at the club, they did the Irish double, winning both the FAI Cup and topping the League of Ireland Premier Division in 1987–88. His performances for Dundalk earned him a £70,000 move to Sheffield United in April 1989. However, he was unable to break into the first team at Bramall Lane. He spent a brief time in 1989–90 on loan at struggling Halifax Town, making two appearances for the club.

=== Stockport County ===
In 1990, he moved to Stockport County, who paid United between £40,000 and £75,000 for his services. He remained at the club for ten years, during which the club would win promotion on two occasions, and make four Wembley appearances. On 10 March 1993, Gannon verbally abused Stoke City player Mark Stein, who reacted by assaulting Gannon. Stein was later required to appear in court for the attack after Gannon made a formal complaint to the police. The two players' confrontation continued the following month after Gannon's then-girlfriend spat at Stein in a post-match interview. Stein was given a conditional discharge after the court accepted he was under "extreme provocation" from what he claimed was racial abuse.

During his early days at the club Gannon was criticised by supporters for his performances. However, he won them over after moving from centre-half to become a goalscoring midfielder. Stockport fans named him 'The Ghost', due to his knack of "ghosting" in at the back of the box to score from crosses. He was also nicknamed "Big Jimbo".

In 1990–91, County achieved promotion from the Fourth Division as runners-up. In 1992, Gannon made his first trip to Wembley Stadium, as Stockport lost 1–0 to Stoke City in the Football League Trophy final. During the same season, Stockport also reached the Third Division play-off final, but were defeated at Wembley. The following year, County again reached the Football League Trophy final but lost 2–1 to Port Vale. In January 1994, Gannon joined Notts County for a brief loan spell to help him overcome some personal problems. Returning to Stockport, he finished the season with his fourth trip to Wembley in two years, as County were denied promotion from the Second Division by a 2–1 defeat to Burnley. The team finally achieved promotion from the division in 1996–97 as runners-up. This promotion was built on a strong defence, of which Gannon and fellow centre-back Sean Connelly were a major part. The following season, County achieved an eighth-place finish in the First Division. He played under the management of Danny Bergara, Dave Jones, Gary Megson, and Andy Kilner.

On 21 March 2000, during a game with Manchester City, he ruptured his anterior cruciate ligaments, keeping him out of action for several months. He was awarded a testimonial match against Manchester City in August 2000, but got into a dispute with the club over the financial arrangements. He then left the club in November 2000, and issued employment tribunal proceedings for unfair dismissal.

=== Later career ===
The following month he joined Dario Gradi's Crewe Alexandra on non-contract terms. After ten games with Crewe, he returned to Ireland.

Following a break from football to obtain qualifications in accountancy, Gannon signed with Shelbourne in August 2001. Despite being appointed as captain upon his arrival, he initially struggled to get into the first-team during the 2001–02 League Championship winning season, and considered a move back to England. However, he found himself a key member of the defence when new manager Pat Fenlon took over. Under Fenlon, Gannon helped the "Shels" to a second-place finish in 2002–03, and also played in the 2002–03 UEFA Champions League qualifying rounds, scoring past Hibernians in a 2–2 draw at the Ta' Qali National Stadium. He did not feature extensively in the club's 2003 League Championship winning side.

Gannon holds a unique record of having scored in all four English divisions, the FA Cup, the League Cup, the Full Members Cup, the English Football League play-offs, the League of Ireland, the FAI Cup, the League of Ireland Cup, and the UEFA Champions League. He has received two distinguished honours from Stockport's supporters since leaving the club – being elected to the Stockport Hall of Fame and as Honorary Vice President of the Hatters Independent Supporters Club. His 479 club appearances put him in third spot in Stockport's all-time appearance list, and his 65 goals are ninth in their scoring records.

== Managerial career ==
=== Dundalk ===
In June 2004, he was appointed to his first managerial post, taking charge of Dundalk, the first club in Gannon's professional playing career. The side finished sixth in the League of Ireland First Division in the 2004 season. On 14 November 2005, Gannon confirmed his resignation from Dundalk after his position had been questioned as his chief supporters, vice-chairman Tom Baldwin and chief executive Sean Connolly, left the club. This left Dundalk without a manager for their final match of the 2005 season, in which they had already secured a comfortable mid-table position in Ireland's second tier of association football. Before Gannon's departure, the team had drawn ten consecutive matches.

=== Stockport County ===
==== 2005–06 ====
In November 2005, Gannon was appointed as director of Stockport County's Centre of Excellence for girls. After the resignation of Chris Turner as Stockport County manager on Boxing Day 2005, Gannon was appointed as caretaker manager with the team nine points adrift of safety at the bottom of League Two, facing potential relegation from the Football League.

County went undefeated in Gannon's first four league games in charge. After three weeks, this upturn in results saw Gannon offered the job full-time, which allowed him to guide County to safety. The club won more than twice as many points in the second half of the season than in the first. Believing that safety would be assured on the final day of the season, he was proved correct as they managed to avoid relegation with a final day draw with champions Carlisle United. Comparisons were made to Sam Allardyce. As a committed Stockport fan, he was already regarded by many Stockport supporters as a legend at the club for his ten years as a player. After delaying talks, he accepted a one-year rolling contract in the summer.

==== 2006–07 ====
At the beginning of the 2006–07 season, Gannon and Stockport announced they had drawn up a five-year plan to take the club to the Championship. Results on the field followed this statement of intent, with Gannon leading County to a League record nine consecutive victories without conceding a goal. Gannon lodged a complaint with The Football Association against Bristol Rovers when a fixture was postponed due to a waterlogged pitch, as he felt not enough was done to ready the pitch, and also a complaint about the referee's handling of the situation. Gannon was later incensed with the FA when the same referee was allowed to take charge of the postponed fixture, which Rovers won 2–1. Gannon also branded approaches from Manchester City and Liverpool "questionable" and "unprofessional" after the two Premier League clubs swooped for youngsters being trained in Stockport County's development squads.

During the season, Gannon and Stockport began to form a close relationship with Alan Lord, the founder of Football Development School ProFootball4u. Anthony Pilkington, who began to feature in County's first team in the second half of this season, was developed through Lord's school. At the end of the season, Lord was taken on at County as a scout and development team coach; he would later follow Gannon to Motherwell.

County missed out on the League Two play-offs due to results on the final day of the season, missing out on goal difference despite a 5–0 victory over Darlington.

==== 2007–08 ====
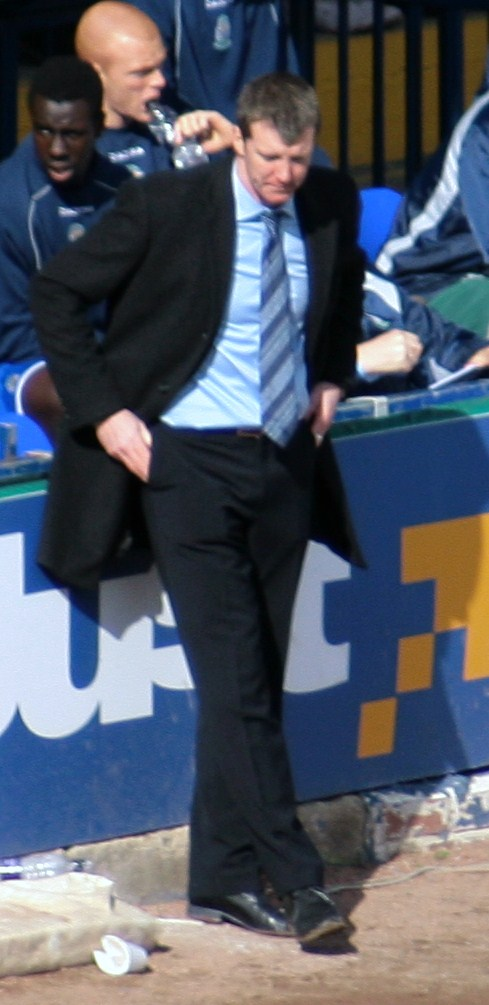
Gannon as Stockport County manager in April 2008.

The 2007–08 season started with a friendly marking the death of Danny Bergara, the manager who had brought Gannon to County as a player in 1990. The friendly was against Cardiff City, managed by Dave Jones, who also managed County whilst Gannon was a player at the club.

On 12 February, Gannon had to leave his father critically ill in a hospital in Ireland to lead his team out to a 4–1 victory over Rotherham United. Later in the year Gannon publicly criticised Paul Ince and the MK Dons after he felt the "Dons" were poor sports in their 3–2 victory over County that ensured Ince's side promotion out of the division.

County finished the 2007–08 season fourth in the league, and subsequently won their play-off semi-final against Wycombe Wanderers 2–1 on aggregate. The club had previously visited Wembley four times, and Gannon had played on all four occasions. He did as a manager what he could never do as a player, and guided Stockport victory at Wembley; the 3–2 win over Rochdale earned Gannon's club promotion to League One. He refused to give a post-match interview to Sky Sports following a nine-month dispute with the company over a broken Skybox. Nevertheless, having quickly taken Stockport from the foot of League Two and into League One on a meagre budget, Gannon had established himself as one of the most highly rated young managers in the lower leagues. In the summer he sold Liam Dickinson to Derby County for £750,000 – a player signed by previous manager, Chris Turner from Woodley Sports for a nominal fee just over two years previous.

==== 2008–09 ====
Gannon led County to an impressive start to the season following their promotion, and they spent Christmas in the play-off places with the best away record in the division. The new year started uncomfortably for Gannon; with media speculation linking him with a move away from Edgeley Park, and the club announcing they were in financial difficulty, he took interviews reassuring fans of his intent to stick by County. Gannon stuck to his one-year rolling deal after rejecting new contract offers from the club.

After a touchline argument with then-club captain Gareth Owen, Gannon gave a forthright interview explaining that disciplinary action would be taken and Owen would be stripped of the captaincy. Owen, who was later released by the club, did not play another game for County. Meanwhile, Gannon was left threatening police action over a strong challenge that left Stockport striker Matty McNeil unconscious and in hospital.

On 24 February 2009 Stockport agreed to allow Gannon to hold talks with Brighton & Hove Albion, who were seeking to fill the managerial position left vacant by Micky Adams. He suggested that his family would play a large part in his decision to move clubs, with Stockport's financial troubles looming but uprooting his family to move to Brighton being undesirable. He met with Brighton chairman Dick Knight, before announcing on 26 February that he had chosen not to take the job. Knight had indicated that Gannon was his first-choice for the job, and former Stockport players then at Brighton had shown their desire for Gannon to be given the job. However, Gannon turned down the opportunity and vowed stay with at the Edgeley Park club.

During the final weeks of the season, County were placed into Administration and docked ten points, leaving them dangerously close to the relegation places. On 6 May 2009, soon after the final game of the season, Gannon was made redundant as manager of Stockport along with assistant boss Peter Ward. This was done by the administrators to slash the wage bill.

=== Motherwell ===
As speculation of a move to Hibernian came to nothing (despite his being installed as the bookmaker's favourite), Gannon instead was confirmed as manager of Scottish Premier League side Motherwell at the end of June 2009, two days before the club's Europa League first round qualifying tie against Llanelli of Wales. To do this he fended off competition from Aidy Boothroyd, Lawrie Sanchez, and Steve Staunton. At the start of his reign he had a limited squad and had to draft in youth players for the Llanelli game. The club had sold off some of their best players, whilst loan deals had ended for others. He also brought in Peter Ward as assistant manager.

"He has a very very good tactical sense, he is a great motivator of players, he works particularly well with young players and brings them on, which is important at a club the size of Motherwell, and he has boundless enthusiasm".

— Motherwell Chairman John Boyle, speaking of Gannon's appointment.

After taking the job, Gannon said that he hoped to bring in up to six players, most of them from England, to bolster a squad threadbare after summer exits. On 2 July, his first game in charge in the Europa League first round qualifying first leg, Motherwell lost 1–0 against Llanelli. However, on the away leg in Wales, the "Steelmen" recorded a 3–0 win to send them into the next round. Motherwell then beat Flamurtari Vlorë 8–2 on aggregate after an 8–1 victory in the home leg. Motherwell were then knocked out by Romanian side FC Steaua București 6–1 on aggregate. Gannon was sent to the stand in Motherwell's Europa League match against Bucharest; However, Gannon later stated he did not know why he or his assistant manager were sent off by referee Carlos Clos Gómez. His first league victory was a 3–1 win over Kilmarnock at Fir Park.

Gannon was named Manager of the Month for October 2009, but he warned of a clear out in the January transfer window. His young team impressed, but proved to be inconsistent. Gannon had a dispute with the SFA head of referee development Hugh Dallas, following Gannon's criticism of Scottish referees. Gannon had claimed the standard of refereeing was "bringing the game into disrepute". He suggested a league table for referees. He then felt the official response to his criticisms to be disrespectful. Following this he temporarily refused to speak to the media, stating he did not wish to cause further controversy. He also criticised his predecessor Mark McGhee, after McGhee speculated in the press on possible transfers of Motherwell players. As well as this he had a public-falling out with club captain Stephen Craigan.

On 28 December, Gannon was dismissed by Motherwell, with the club indicating that Gannon was "not fully committed to the club" as the reason for their decision. He had been rumoured to be looking for other jobs. Gannon was reportedly working under a temporary contract, and was yet to sign a longer-term deal as had been expected. Though the board were satisfied with the results on the pitch, they felt that the relationship between Gannon and the directors had broken down. Dubbed a "loose Gannon", it was seen that either he or club captain Craigan would leave the club. Despite this he was praised for his signings from the English leagues, and for good open passing football his young side could play whilst at their best. Motherwell went on to finish the season in fifth place under Craig Brown.

=== Peterborough United ===
On 2 February 2010, Gannon was appointed manager of Peterborough United, following the dismissal of Mark Cooper. The club lay bottom of the Championship, nine points adrift of safety. Gannon aimed to restore "pride" in the club, and offered a fresh start to unsettled players. He won his first game in charge, leading Peterborough to a 1–0 victory over Queens Park Rangers on 6 February. His contract was due to expire in the summer and the club were keen to tie him down to a longer deal. There soon came confusion over the exact role of the manager and others at the club in terms of recruiting new players.

He utilised unique tactical formations, which earned him comparisons to Martin O'Neill. He was particularly experimental with the front line, and was willing to use the loan market to bring in fresh talent. On 24 March, it was announced Gannon would leave Peterborough at the end of the season. Unable to avoid relegation despite a vast upturn in results, he announced that family commitments made him unwilling to stay longer. Gannon had been satisfied with the board's contract offer, but his family still resided in Stockport. He was replaced by Gary Johnson on 6 April, following Gannon's recommendation of Johnson, though Gannon insisted that this was not ultimately his decision but instead was down to the board. Striker Liam Dickinson was sad to see him go, and told the media that Gannon would have little trouble finding a new management post.

=== Port Vale ===
In January 2011, Gannon was one of three candidates reported to have impressed in interviews for the vacant Port Vale job, making him one of the favourites for the position. However, Paul Simpson's dismissal at Stockport County led to hopes of a return to the club for some County fans. Therefore, he was installed as the bookmakers' favourite to become the next Port Vale manager, and also the bookmakers' favourite for the Stockport job. Gannon was confirmed as the manager of Port Vale on 6 January 2011, succeeding Micky Adams at the helm of the promotion chasing club, signing a contract that lasted until summer 2012. Saying that finishing outside of the top seven would be a "failure", Gannon's first task after "burying the hatchet" with Gareth Owen was to look for a new striker. Two weeks into his reign club captain Tommy Fraser left the club by mutual consent, as signs of what would be an unhappy relationship between club and manager quickly came to the surface. Gannon then brought in Romaine Sawyers and Kayleden Brown on loan from West Bromwich Albion, Jay O'Shea on loan from Birmingham City, Exodus Geohaghon on loan from Peterborough United, and striker Tom Pope on loan from Rotherham United.

Losing four of his first five games in charge, Gannon was forced to respond to criticism over his team selections and substitutions, and announced plans to expand the club's non-playing staff. On 1 February the players met with the chairman and rumours spread that Gannon had 'lost the dressing room', as comparisons were made with Brian Clough's Leeds United tenure from The Damned United. Yet the next day an O'Shea volley gave Vale a 1–0 win over promotion rivals Rotherham United to give Gannon his first win in charge at the club. However, tension remained, as proven at the end of the month when it was reported that Gannon left the team bus on a pre-match journey after rowing with assistant manager Geoff Horsfield. Gannon had previously told the press his staff were "underqualified", though insisted any changes would be "implemented at a later stage" and that Horsfield was a "great assistant".

It was later reported in the media that Horsfield had requested a day off to deal with a family matter, which Gannon granted before subsequently writing a letter to the board complaining of Horsfield's conduct. An unnamed director then handed the letter to Horsfield, who confronted Gannon over the issue and brandished the letter as proof when Gannon denied its existence. This came on the same day that local newspaper The Sentinel ran an editorial that questioned Gannon's loan signings, his decision to drop Gary Roberts and branded his tactics and team selections as "baffling". Having returned to the team to steer his side to a 2–1 victory over Aldershot Town, Gannon said "there's been misrepresentation in the media over my part in this. I'm completely the innocent party". The club informed Horsfield that he would face a disciplinary hearing, whilst Gannon would not be asked to defend his actions and would merely provide a witness statement. The club took no action, and after Horsfield spent two weeks at home the pair returned to work as before. He continued to exploit the loan market, signing Dominic Blizzard from Bristol Rovers, a midfielder who played under him at Stockport.

Vale's poor form continued and on 19 March they dropped out of the play-off places for the first time all season following a 3–0 defeat at Accrington Stanley. Ugly post-match scenes at the Crown Ground saw Geohaghon confront fans who singled him out for abuse, whilst Gannon was ushered quietly out of the back door. Roberts told the media "I don't think the manager likes me and, to be honest, I don't like him". Rumours circulated that Gannon would soon be on his way out. These rumours were proved accurate two days later, as Gannon's departure was confirmed by the club. Deeply unpopular with Vale supporters, his sacking was "quick and with little emotion", whilst his reported poor man-management skills resulted in him having the shortest reign as manager in the club's history. Despite this he did receive credit for spotting the potential talent in a teenage Sam Morsy, and for bringing Tom Pope to the club. Gannon himself made a statement on his website declaring his disappointment in the club's decision to terminate his contract after such a short period of time, and also bemoaned that he "wasn't able to add many new players [to the squad]". Port Vale continued to struggle under caretaker manager Mark Grew, winning just two of their remaining ten games, and finishing 2010–11 in 11th place.

=== Return to Stockport County ===
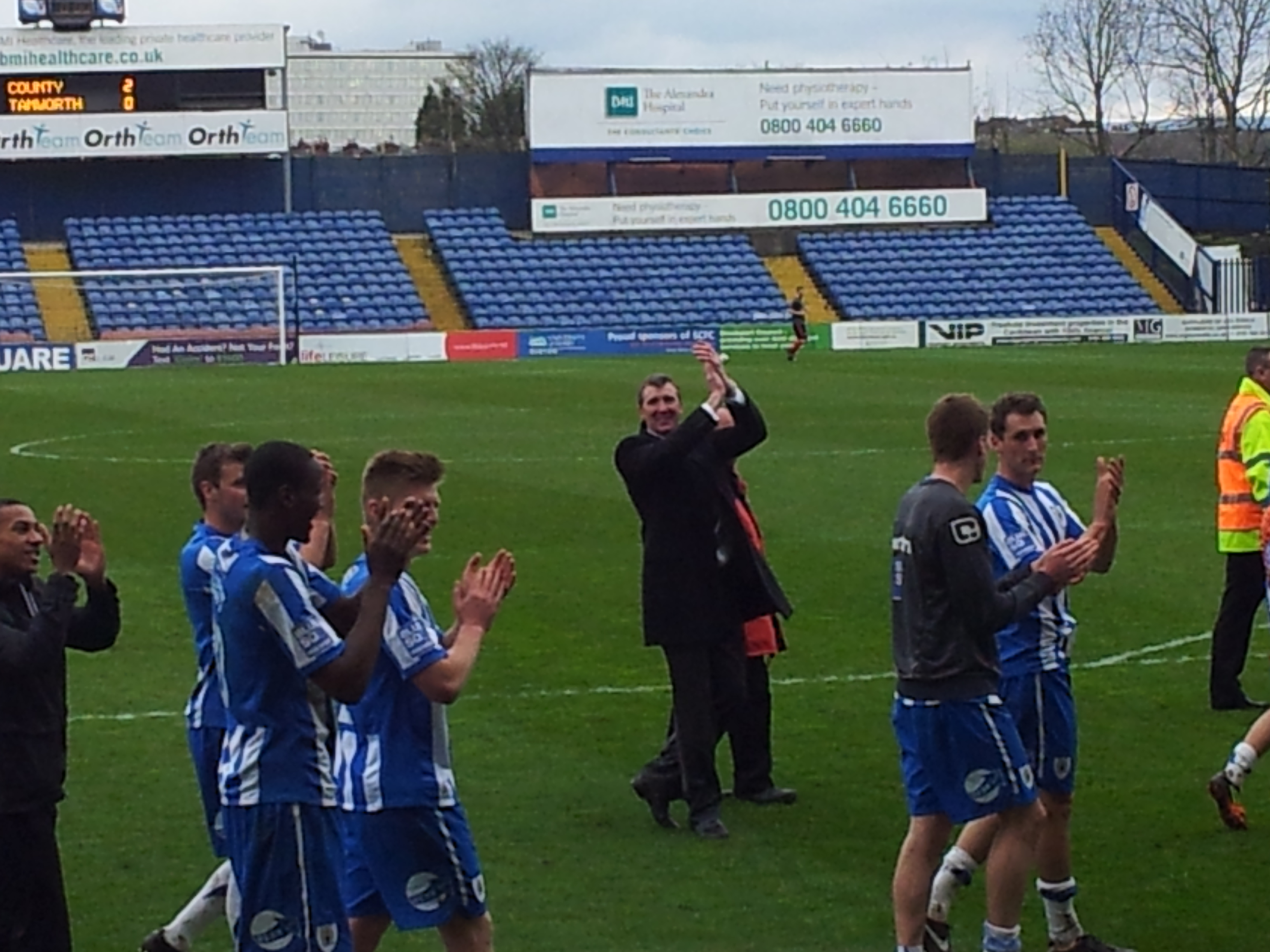
Gannon as Stockport County manager in 2012

Following the resignation of Dietmar Hamann in November 2011, speculation came of a return to Stockport County for Gannon; when questioned on the possibility, club chairman Peter Snape stated that should he apply for the position then "he'd merit very serious consideration". In the thirty months since Gannon's departure, the club had seen five full-time managers come and go, suffered relegation into the Conference National and had not won back-to-back games since February 2009. On 14 November, he was revealed as the club's director of football, a position leaving him "responsible for all football matters including 1st team selection and transfers"; Willie McStay remained at the club, as his assistant. When he took charge Stockport were 17th in the league, just two points above the relegation zone, having won just three of their opening twenty games. He stated that his aim for 2011–12 was to avoid letting the club slip to a third-successive relegation.

After losing his first five games in charge, including a 7–0 defeat against Grimsby Town at Blundell Park, Gannon said that the club's finances limited his ability to change personnel. He also stated that "if I didn't take the job, this club would've had a real chance of dying... I'm not proud to be the manager of a club that loses 7–0... but this is my team now... It has always been my club, so it's my responsibility to make things better, and over time we will." He released striker Antonio German, defender Chris Blackburn, and seven goal top-scorer Nick Chadwick in the January transfer window. He then signed defender Joe Connor on non-contract terms, and teenagers Aaron Cole and Danny Rowe on loan. His first win in his second spell at the club came on New Year's Day, in a 3–2 victory over Barrow at Edgeley Park. He then re-signed former players Paul Turnbull and Matty Mainwaring on loan. Worried by the situation at crisis clubs Darlington and Kettering Town, Gannon cancelled the contracts of veterans Matt Glennon, John Miles, Mark Lynch, and Ryan McCann. He brought in 23-year-old Telford defender Sean Newton and 18-year-old Sunderland keeper Lewis King on loan, whilst signing 19-year-old Lancaster City midfielder Danny Hattersley on a permanent transfer. The "Hatters" secured their Conference status with two games to spare, after a 1–1 home draw with Braintree Town on 14 April, having lost just twice in the league at Edgeley Park since Gannon's return. Stockport finished the campaign in 16th place, 10 points above the drop and 20 points below the play-off zone.

In preparation for the 2012–13 season, Gannon signed defenders Sean Newton and James Tunnicliffe, and took back Paul Turnbull on loan once again. However, he was disappointed to lose striker Tom Elliott, who rejected a contract offer to switch to Cambridge United. He also appointed long-time associate Alan Lord as his assistant. However, County found themselves struggling in the league, and Gannon blamed the predicament on the board's decision to slash the wage budget in the summer. An angry Lord Snape told the press that "I'm getting pretty fed up of watching part-time teams beat Stockport County. Changes are going to be made unless things improve. Jim Gannon's pretty good at telling me how this club should be run. Well I'm going to tell him that I'm not impressed by the way the team is being run. If we lose a couple of our next games, we're in a relegation battle with a much bigger budget than most of the teams down there with us, which quite frankly is not good enough." 14 months into his second spell at Edgeley Park and with County sitting in the relegation zone, Gannon was relieved of his duties as Stockport manager on 16 January 2013 following the 3–1 home defeat by Mansfield Town.

=== Northwich Victoria ===
On 9 December 2013, it was announced that Gannon would become the new manager of Northern Premier League Division One North side Northwich Victoria. He replaced Lee Ashcroft, who resigned as manager and became director of football after picking up a ten-match ban for sexist abuse. The "Vics" ended the 2013–14 season in ninth place. They reached the play-offs in the 2014–15 campaign, losing to Bamber Bridge at the semi-final stage. He took the club on a successful FA Cup run in the 2015–16 campaign, leaving them as the lowest rank team in the competition when they were knocked out by League Two side Northampton Town in the second round. Northwich had led 2–0 with eight minutes to play before a late comeback from Northampton.

=== Third spell at Stockport County ===
Gannon became manager of Stockport County, now in the National League North, for the third time in his career on 18 January 2016. Gannon started well, taking the team to the Cheshire Senior Cup final and up to ninth in the table with a sequence of seven games unbeaten, including five victories, in the run-up to Easter. In December, he signed a new two-and-a-half-year contract. County finished eighth in the 2016–17 season, one point outside the play-offs. Gannon was credited with turning around the career of Danny Lloyd, who signed for Peterborough United in May 2017, 12 months after Gannon had persuaded him to play for County rather than quit the game altogether. Gannon said that he was pleased with his defence, but wanted to overhaul the attacking side to reach the play-offs the following season. He achieved his aim as Stockport qualified for the play-offs with a fifth-place finish in the 2017–18 campaign, before losing 1–0 to Chorley in the qualifying round. Following the defeat he sold 22-year-old midfielder James Ball to Stevenage for an undisclosed five-figure fee.

County reached the second round of the FA Cup in the 2018–19 season, where they fell to a 1–0 defeat at Barnet. Gannon was named as Manager of the Month award in the National League North for December 2018 after his team rose from the bottom half of the table to the top three and also advanced in the FA Trophy. They went on to finish as champions, beating Chorley into second-place by a single point, to end a six-year stay in the sixth-tier. He was named as National League North Manager of the Year for the 2018–19 season. Stockport were just inside the play-offs in seventh-place in the National League when the 2019–20 season was postponed, never to be resumed, on 26 March. Stockport were denied a play-off place However, as they dropped to eighth-place on points-per-game. On 21 January 2021, with the club sitting fourth in the National League, Stockport parted company with Gannon, the board citing that "the decision is not results based but is centred around culture". In July 2021, he was appointed as Football Education Programme Manager at Oldham Athletic.

=== Hyde United ===
On 31 August 2021, Gannon was announced as the new manager of Northern Premier League Premier Division side Hyde United. He stated: "I am not coming in to change things but embrace the philosophy that is already here and the way they play and develop it." On 10 February 2022, Gannon was sacked with Hyde sitting 19th in the league table, one place above the relegation zone.

== Managerial style ==
Gannon holds a full UEFA Pro Licence.

Priding himself on playing flowing football in the lower leagues of the English game, Gannon has repeatedly spoken out against clubs he feels play too physically and referees he feels do not give his players enough protection. As a manager in England, Scotland and Ireland, his teams have picked up fair play awards. He has stated that this fair play approach is based on his belief that it is "good principles that lead to good football".

"My philosophy is good passing football, it is how I believe the game should be played and it brings out the best in players. It inspires them and motivates them to play football in the right manner."

— Gannon speaking in February 2010.

Gannon has also been called a "tactical maverick" due to his unusual formations. These formations include 3–4–1–2, 4–3–2–1, 4–1–2–3, and his preferred set-up of 4–2–3–1. He has stated that he prefers formations that use four lines of players (as opposed to three lines in the classic 4–4–2) due to the added depth in defence and presence in midfield, and was inspired to use the formations by Carlo Ancelotti. He has also stated that he prefers the 4–3–3 formation to the 4–4–2 formation, and has criticised the way he perceives 4–4–2 to be "ingrained in the culture" of English football. He is known to be extremely thorough and meticulous in preparing his players for games.

Of an outspoken nature, he has had public fallings out with players, referees, chairmen, opposition players and managers, and authorities. The Guardian surmised this by saying that "the feeling about Gannon is that it is his way or the highway."

== Career statistics ==
=== Playing statistics ===
Appearances and goals by club, season and competition
Club	Season	League			National cup (Note: Includes FA Cup, League of Ireland Cup)		Other^{[A]}		Total	
Club	Season	Division	Apps	Goals	Apps	Goals	Apps	Goals	Apps	Goals
Dundalk	1987–98	LOI Premier Division	2	0	0	0	1	0	3	0
Dundalk	1988–99	LOI Premier Division	26	1	2	0	6	0	34	1
Dundalk	Total		28	1	2	0	7	0	37	1
Sheffield United	1989–90	Second Division	0	0	0	0	0	0	0	0
Halifax Town (loan)	1989–90	Fourth Division	2	0	0	0	0	0	2	0
Stockport County	1989–90	Fourth Division	7	1	0	0	1	0	8	1
Stockport County	1990–91	Fourth Division	41	6	1	0	4	1	46	7
Stockport County	1991–92	Third Division	43	16	2	1	13	4	58	21
Stockport County	1992–93	Second Division	46	12	3	0	14	3	63	15
Stockport County	1993–94	Second Division	16	0	2	0	4	1	22	1
Stockport County	1994–95	Second Division	45	7	1	0	6	0	52	7
Stockport County	1995–96	Second Division	23	1	2	0	7	1	32	2
Stockport County	1996–97	Second Division	40	4	4	0	15	1	59	5
Stockport County	1997–98	First Division	36	1	2	0	4	0	42	1
Stockport County	1998–99	First Division	38	0	2	0	2	0	42	0
Stockport County	1999–2000	First Division	29	0	1	0	3	0	33	0
Stockport County	Total		364	48	18	3	69	10	451	61
Notts County (loan)	1993–94	First Division	2	0	0	0	0	0	2	0
Crewe Alexandra	2000–01	First Division	7	0	3	0	0	0	10	0
Shelbourne	2001–02	LOI Premier Division	30	4	1	0	1	0	32	4
Shelbourne	2002–03	LOI Premier Division	22	4	1	0	2	1	25	5
Shelbourne	2003	LOI Premier Division	9	1	0	0	0	0	9	1
Shelbourne	Total		61	9	2	0	3	1	66	10
Career total			464	58	25	3	79	11	568	69

A. The "Other" column constitutes appearances and goals in the League Cup, Football League Trophy, Football League play-offs, Full Members Cup, LFA President Cup, Leinster Senior Cup, League of Ireland Cup, and UEFA Champions League.

=== Managerial statistics ===
As of match played 8 February 2022

Managerial record by team and tenure
Team	From	To	Record					Ref.
Team	From	To	P	W	D	L	Win %	Ref.
Dundalk	8 June 2004	14 November 2005	72	26	18	28	36.1	
Stockport County	28 December 2005	6 May 2009	182	79	42	61	43.4	
Motherwell	30 June 2009	28 December 2009	25	7	8	10	28.0	
Peterborough United	1 February 2010	6 April 2010	14	4	1	9	28.6	
Port Vale	6 January 2011	21 March 2011	15	4	4	7	26.7	
Stockport County	14 November 2011	16 January 2013	59	18	14	27	30.5	
Northwich Victoria	9 December 2013	19 January 2016	113	66	21	26	58.4	
Stockport County	19 January 2016	21 January 2021	266	136	64	66	51.1	
Hyde United	31 August 2021	10 February 2022	29	9	5	15	31.0	
Total			774	349	176	249	45.1	

== Honours ==
=== As player ===
Dundalk

- LFA President Cup: 1989; runner-up: 1988

Stockport County

- Football League Second Division second-place promotion: 1996–97
- Football League Fourth Division second-place promotion: 1990–91
- Associate Members' Cup / Football League Trophy runner-up: 1991–92, 1992–93

Shelbourne

- League of Ireland Premier Division: 2001–02, 2003

=== As manager ===
Stockport County

- Football League Two play-offs: 2008
- National League North: 2018–19
- Cheshire Senior Cup: 2015–16

Northwich Victoria

- Cheshire Senior Cup: 2013–14

Individual

- Scottish Premier League Manager of the Month: October 2009
- National League North Manager of the Year: 2018–19
- National League North Manager of the Month: December 2016, December 2018
