= Michael McNamara =

Michael McNamara may refer to:

- Michael McNamara (footballer), Irish footballer from Sligo
- Michael McNamara (politician) (born 1974), Irish Labour Party/Independent politician for Clare
- Michael McNamara (Medal of Honor) (1839–1907), U.S. Marine and Medal of Honor recipient
- Michael McNamara (filmmaker), Canadian film and television director and producer
- Mike McNamara (born 1949), Irish hurling manager
- Mike McNamara (ice hockey) (born 1949), Canadian ice hockey defenceman

== See also ==
- Michael MacNamara (died 1767), politician in colonial Maryland, mayor of Annapolis
