= Rory Keane =

Irish footballer (1922–2004)

Personal information
- Full name: Thomas Roderick Keane
- Date of birth: 31 August 1922
- Place of birth: Limerick, Republic of Ireland
- Date of death: 13 February 2004 (aged 81)
- Height: 5 ft 9 in (1.75 m)
- Position: Defender

Senior career*
Years	Team	Apps	(Gls)
19xx–1947	Limerick		
1947–1955	Swansea Town	164	(0)
1955–19xx	Llanelli		
- Haverfordwest County

International career
1948	Ireland (IFA)	1	(0)
1948–1949	Ireland (FAI)	4	(0)
- * Club domestic league appearances and goals

Thomas Roderick "Rory" Keane (31 August 1922 – 13 February 2004) was an Irish footballer who spent most of his career at Swansea Town. A hard-tackling defender, he is still regarded as one of Swansea's greatest ever players. Keane was also a dual internationalist and played for both Ireland teams – the IFA XI and the FAI XI. Two broken legs limited his international career to just five caps and he eventually retired after breaking his leg for a third time. Keane then settled in south Wales where he lived until his death in 2004. His grandson, Jamie Harris is also a notable footballer. He began his career with Swansea City and has also played for several clubs in the League of Ireland.

== Club career ==
Keane began his career with League of Ireland side Limerick. In June 1947, he signed for Swansea Town and quickly became a firm favourite with Swans fans. Keane was part of a strong Irish contingent playing for the club at the time. Others included Jackie O'Driscoll, Jim Feeney and Sammy McCrory. The team also included Welsh internationals Jack Parry and Roy Paul and was one of the club's most successful sides of all time. Together they won the Third Division South title in impressive style in 1949. They regularly playing to crowds of up to 30,000 and were promoted as champions after winning 27 games during the season, including 17 successive wins at home and 6 successive away wins. They had a goal difference of 45. Keane also helped Swansea reach two Welsh Cup finals and collected a winners medal after they beat Wrexham 4–1 in the 1950 final. After 164 league games for Swansea, he went on to play for Llanelli in the Southern League and Haverfordwest County and Pembroke Borough in the Welsh League.

== Irish international ==
When Keane began his international career in 1948 there were, in effect, two Ireland teams, chosen by two rival associations. Both associations, the Northern Ireland – based IFA and the Republic of Ireland – based FAI claimed jurisdiction over the whole of Ireland and selected players from the whole island. As a result, several notable Irish players from this era, including Keane, played for both teams.

=== IFA XI ===
On 17 November 1948, Keane made his international debut with the IFA XI in a 3–2 defeat against Scotland at Hampden Park. His teammates on the day included several fellow dual internationalists, including another Swan, Jackie O'Driscoll and another former Limerick player, Davy Walsh, who scored both goals for the IFA XI. This, however, was Keane's one and only appearance for the IFA XI.

=== FAI XI ===
Between 1948 and 1949, Keane also made 4 appearances for the FAI XI. He won his first FAI cap on 5 December 1948, in a 1–0 defeat in a friendly against Switzerland at Dalymount Park. He also played for the FAI XI on 22 May 1949, in another friendly at Dalymount against Portugal and helped the FAI XI win 1–0. He won his third FAI XI cap on 2 June 1949, in a 3–1 away defeat against Sweden. This was a qualifier for the 1950 FIFA World Cup. He made his final appearance for the FAI XI on 12 June 1949, in a 4–1 home defeat against Spain.

== Honours ==
Swansea Town

- Third Division South
  - Winners 1948–49: 1
- Welsh Cup
  - Winners 1949–50: 1
  - Runners Up 1948–49: 1
