= Stephen McGuinness =

Irish footballer

Personal information
- Date of birth: 2 August 1973 (age 53)
- Place of birth: Dublin, Ireland

Senior career*
Years	Team	Apps	(Gls)
1992–1997	Home Farm	110	(6)
1997–2001	St Patrick's Athletic	82	(9)
2001–2002	Dundalk	29	(1)
2002–2003	Shamrock Rovers	23	(2)
2004–2005	Dundalk	66	(7)
Total		310	(25)
- * Club domestic league appearances and goals

Stephen McGuinness (born 2 August 1973) is an Irish former footballer.

A centre half, he played schoolboy football for Home Farm and spent his schooldays in Patrician College, Finglas, a school which has produced many Republic of Ireland underage internationals players, and most notably two full international players in Alan Moore (footballer) and Ronnie Whelan.

McGuinness made his League of Ireland debut for Home Farm against St James' Gate on 11 October 1992.

He joined St Patrick's Athletic in 1997 where he had a very successful four years before joining Dundalk where his stay was to be brief following their relegation in 2002.

McGuinness was Liam Buckley's first signing at Shamrock Rovers and in his two seasons he scored 3 times in 30 appearances which included one goal from 2 appearances in the 2002–03 UEFA Cup He made his Rovers debut on 11 July 2002. In his first appearance against his old club he was sent off. He scored his first League goal on 3 January 2003.

McGuinness missed Rovers game at Slovan Liberec in the UEFA Intertoto Cup in July 2003 due to his marriage. On his last appearance for the Hoops he scored the equaliser.

He then spent another two seasons at Oriel Park before retiring.

Stephen McGuinness is currently the General Secretary of the PFAI.

== Honours ==
- League of Ireland: 2
  - St Patrick's Athletic 1995/96, 1997/98
- FAI Cup
  - Dundalk 2002
