= Jamie Harris (footballer) =

Welsh footballer

Personal information
- Full name: James Christopher Harris
- Date of birth: 28 June 1979 (age 47)
- Place of birth: Cardiff, Wales
- Position: Defender

Senior career*
Years	Team	Apps	(Gls)
1997–1998	Swansea City	6	(0)
199?–199?	→Rhayader Town (loan)	?	(?)
199?–199?	→Haverfordwest County (loan)	?	(?)
1999–2000	Bohemians	24	(4)
2000–2003	St Patrick's Athletic	?	(?)
2003–2006	Shelbourne	86	(10)
2007–2008	Dunfermline Athletic	10	(0)
2008–2010	St Patrick's Athletic	?	(?)
2010	Drogheda United		
- * Club domestic league appearances and goals

James Christopher Harris (born 28 June 1979) is a Welsh professional footballer.

Harris began his football career at local football side Mumbles Rangers before joining Swansea City in 1996. He impressed in a trial game against Swindon Town and manager Jan Molby offered him a two-year contract; he later went out on loan to Merthyr Town to gain some first-team experience. When his contract at Swansea expired, he had short spells at Rhayader Town and Haverfordwest County.

He moved to Bohemians (Bohs) in 1999 and scored on his debut away to Waterford United in a 2–0 victory. He spent one season at Bohs, making 24 league appearances and scoring four league goals before moving to St Patrick's Athletic. He signed for Scottish club Dunfermline Athletic on 28 January 2007 on a free transfer, having previously been at League of Ireland side Shelbourne with whom he won three league titles.

Harris left Dunfermline in January 2008 and he then re-signed for St Patrick's Athletic.

His late grandfather Rory Keane was a Republic of Ireland international player.

== Honours ==
- League of Ireland: 3
  - Shelbourne 2003, 2004, 2006

== See also ==
- Dunfermline Athletic F.C. season 2007-08
