= Colm Foley =

Irish football player

Personal information
- Date of birth: 30 May 1979 (age 47)
- Place of birth: Dublin, Ireland
- Position: Centre back

Youth career
- Belvedere
- Manortown United

Senior career*
Years	Team	Apps	(Gls)
1998–2000	Drogheda United	12	(0)
2000–2007	St Patrick's Athletic	198	(22)
- * Club domestic league appearances and goals

Colm Foley (born 30 May 1979) is an Irish football player who was forced to retire due to injury in January 2008 while playing for St Patrick's Athletic in the League of Ireland.

== Career ==
Foley was a central defender and played schoolboy football for Belvedere and Manortown United. In 1998, he signed for Martin Lawlor at Drogheda United but spent the start of the season on the bench. When Eddie May took over Foley made his League of Ireland debut at University College Dublin A.F.C. on 23 January 2000.

In the summer of 2000 Pat Dolan signed Foley for St Patrick's Athletic. He initially played as a deep holding midfielder but soon settled as a centre half alongside fellow new signing Darragh Maguire. In 2001/2002 season Foley played a huge part in the St. Pats side that finished top of the table, only for the FAI to deduct points for player registration irregularities. When Paul Osam retired in 2004, Foley was given the honour of club captain. Early in 2005, Foley suffered an anterior cruciate ligament injury for the second time and missed nearly 12 months of football. He returned to the St Pats side in July 2006 but persistent injuries led to his eventual retirement in January 2008.

He is now part of the Monday Night Soccer programme .

== Honours ==
- League of Ireland Cup: 2
  - St Patrick's Athletic - 2001, 2003

== Sources ==
- DUFC A Claret and Blue History by Brian Whelan (2010)
