= Owen Heary =

Irish football player and manager

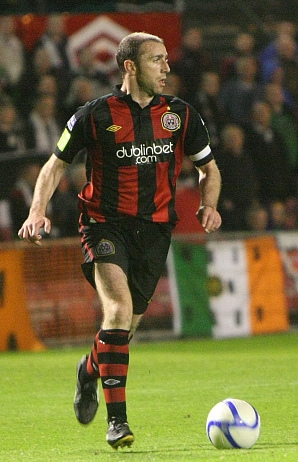
- Owen Heary in action for Bohemians

Personal information
- Date of birth: 4 October 1976 (age 50)
- Place of birth: Dublin, Ireland
- Position: Right back

Senior career*
Years	Team	Apps	(Gls)
1993–1994	Kilkenny City	16	(1)
1994–1998	Home Farm	111	(6)
1998–2006	Shelbourne	274	(13)
2007–2013	Bohemians	168	(9)
Total		569	(29)

Managerial career
- 2011: Bohemians Reserves
- 2011–2013: Bohemians Under 19
- 2012–2013: Bohemians (assistant manager)
- 2013–2014: Bohemians
- 2014–2015: Sligo Rovers
- 2016–2018: Shelbourne
- * Club domestic league appearances and goals

Owen Heary (born 4 October 1976) is an Irish professional football player and manager. He is formerly the manager of Shelbourne in the League of Ireland First Division, the club with which he spent most of his playing career.

== Playing career ==
He made his League of Ireland debut for Kilkenny City at Bray Wanderers on 21 November 1993. After one season at Buckley Park he moved home to Home Farm where in 4 seasons he won the First Division Shield.

He won five league titles and one FAI Cup with Shelbourne after making his debut against Finn Harps at Tolka Park in September 1998. He accompanied Dermot Keely, his former manager at Home Farm (whom Heary had captained) to Shelbourne.

Heary, a right-sided full-back noted for his robust tackling, general fitness and frequent sorties up the right flank in support of his attack, was elected Player of the Year for the 2001/2002 season by his peers in the Professional Footballers' Association of Ireland.

Heary was unveiled as a Bohemians player at a press conference on 22 January 2007 and has since slotted into the side with ease, playing a large part in Bohs' above average defensive record. Owen captained Bohs to the 2008 league title and FAI Cup.

He collected a bucketful of personal honours during the season, being voted on to the Eircom League of Ireland Premier Division Team for 2008, receiving 42% of the votes for the right back position and named the eircom/Soccer Writers Association of Ireland (SWAI) player of the month for October . This was topped off when he was named the SWAI Personality of the Year on 4 December.

Heary struggled with injuries during the 2009 season, only making 20 league appearances.. However, he collected his first ever League Cup winners medal in the September as Bohs beat Waterford United 3–1 at the RSC.

In November 2009, Heary as captain, collected the Premier Division trophy for the Bohemians first back-to-back league wins. In doing so, he equalled Johnny Matthews record of 7 league winners medals.

Despite captaining the club to the Setanta Sports Cup, Bohemians had a disappointing 2010 season where the club lost their league title on goal difference and failed to make an impact in Europe where they made an embarrassing exit to Welsh side The New Saints.

Heary retired as a player in 2013. His testimonial was played between Shels and Bohs at Dalymount Park in November 2013.

== Management ==
Owen took his first steps into management during 2011 when he took charge of Bohs' A Team and under 19 team and also managed the first team during their Leinster Senior Cup matches. When Pat Fenlon departed for Hibernian, Owen became Aaron Callaghan's assistant manager for the 2012 season.

After a poor run of results during the 2013 season which left Bohs in the relegation zone, Callaghan was sacked as manager and Heary was appointed to take caretaker charge of the club. Due to Heary not possessing the necessary coaching qualifications, this was for an initial 60-day period until 12 September 2013. Heary now holds a UEFA Pro Licence having been shortlisted by the FAI to do the course in January 2014.

Heary managed Sligo Rovers until June 2015.

He was appointed as manager of Shelbourne on 28 June 2016 following Kevin Doherty's resignation.

== European competition ==
Heary made 41 appearances in European competition and scored against Rhyl F.C. in the 2008 UEFA Intertoto Cup .

== Honours ==
=== Player ===
Home Farm

- League of Ireland First Division Shield (1): 1998

Shelbourne

- League of Ireland (5): 1999–2000, 2001–02, 2003, 2004, 2006
- FAI Cup (1): 1999–2000
- FAI Super Cup 2001–2002
- LFA President's Cup (2) 1998–1999, 2002–2003

Bohemians

- League of Ireland (2): 2008, 2009
- FAI Cup (1): 2008
- League of Ireland Cup (1): 2009
- Setanta Sports Cup (1): 2009–10

Individual

- PFAI Players' Player of the Year (1): 2001–02
- SWAI Personality of the Year (1): 2008
- Eircom League Player of the Year (1): 2005
- League of Ireland team of the year 12 times
- Independent Sports Star of the week 2004
- Shelbourne record appearance holder (274)

=== Manager ===
Shelbourne

- Leinster Senior Cup (2) 2017,2018
