= Alex Nesovic =

English footballer

Alex Nesovic (born 10 November 1972) is an English former footballer who played as a striker for Queen of the South, Albion Rovers, Partick Thistle, Scarborough and Ayr United.
