= Dublin City F.C. =

Former association football club based in Dublin, Ireland

Dublin City
- Full name: Dublin City Football Club
- Nicknames: The Vikings; Dubs
- Founded: 1999
- Dissolved: 2006
- Ground: Morton Stadium (2002); Whitehall Stadium (2003, 2005); Tolka Park (2004); Richmond Park (2005); Dalymount Park (2006)
- Chairman: Ronan Seery
- Website: dublincityfc.com (archived)
Home colours	Away colours

Dublin City Football Club was an Irish association football club based in the Northside of Dublin. The club played in the League of Ireland. They were formed in 1999 after a split within Home Farm Everton and originally played as Home Farm Fingal before changing their name for the 2001–02 season. They disbanded in 2006 due to financial problems.

== History ==
Dublin City F.C. was founded in 1999 as Home Farm Fingal, a club that had originated from another Dublin-based football club; Home Farm F.C. Following the end of a sponsorship agreement with Everton, Home Farm had decided to leave the League of Ireland and refocus the club's efforts on their underage teams. Ronan Seery – the club's CEO at the time and son of one of their founders – persuaded the club to allow him to continue a franchise in the League of Ireland under the name of 'Home Farm Fingal'.

Chart of yearly table positions for Dublin City in League of Ireland

Although named after the north County Dublin area, the people of Fingal failed to identify with the new Home Farm as they saw it as a continuation of the previous entity. As a result, Seery renamed the club to Dublin City F.C. in 2001. The club was based in Dublin and in 2006, its final year of operation, played their home matches at Dalymount Park. Dublin City's last manager was Dermot Keely.

Nicknamed "The Vikings", they adopted the same colours as the Dublin GAA team. Their shirt sponsor was Carrolls of Dublin, a chain of tourist souvenir shops, which sold club-branded merchandise at its stores in the city centre and Dublin Airport.

The club was twice promoted to the League of Ireland Premier Division, winning the 2003 League of Ireland First Division and then defeating Shamrock Rovers in a promotion/relegation play-off in 2005.

However, Dublin City failed to cultivate a significant fan base, and very low attendances were reported at their games. The average home attendance in 2004 was 592 fans and by the following season, this had fallen to 177. In addition to its small following, the club had no permanent home ground, playing at various times in Tolka Park, Dalymount Park, Morton Stadium, Richmond Park, and Whitehall Stadium. As a result of these factors, the club experienced financial problems and, on 19 July 2006, Dublin City F.C. ceased trading and resigned from the league. The results of all their games up to that point in the season were expunged from the record.

Ronan Seery issued a statement saying, "Due to ongoing difficulties, our continued existence within the Eircom League simply became untenable and while extremely difficult to make, it is the most prudent and honourable decision and course of action to take." However, the club was heavily criticised in some quarters, for example by Damien Richardson and Roddy Collins for failing to complete their league fixtures. Roddy Collins, who managed Dublin City in 2004 but left abruptly on bad terms, called the club's actions "disgraceful."

== Honours ==
League of Ireland First Division

- Winners: 2003
- Runners-up: 2005
