= Jim Crawford (footballer) =

Footballer (born 1973)

Personal information
- Full name: James Crawford
- Date of birth: 1 May 1973 (age 53)
- Place of birth: Chicago, Illinois, United States
- Position: Midfielder

Youth career
- 1989–1991: Terenure Rangers

Senior career*
Years	Team	Apps	(Gls)
1991–1995	Bohemians	64	(3)
1995–1998	Newcastle United	2	(0)
1996	→ Rotherham United (loan)	11	(0)
1998	→ Dundee United (loan)	2	(0)
1998–2000	Reading	20	(1)
2000–2007	Shelbourne	180	(12)
2008	Sporting Fingal	12	(0)
Total		291	(16)

International career
1993–1994	Republic of Ireland U21	3	(0)

Managerial career
- 2008: Shamrock Rovers (interim)
- 2016–2019: Republic of Ireland U18 (Coach)
- 2018–2020: Republic of Ireland U21 (Assistant)
- 2020–: Republic of Ireland U21
- * Club domestic league appearances and goals

James "Jim" Crawford (born 1 May 1973) is a football coach and former professional player. He played as a midfielder for Bohemians, Newcastle United, Rotherham United, Dundee United, Reading, Shelbourne and Sporting Fingal. Born in the United States, he played for the Republic of Ireland at under-21 level.

== Playing career ==
Crawford was born in Chicago, United States. He began his career at schoolboy level with Terenure Rangers before moving to Bohemians making his debut against Bray Wanderers on 3 November 1991. He soon became a big favourite at Dalymount Park and won the PFAI Young Player of the Year for the 1993–94 season.

Represented Republic of Ireland at the World Student Games in 1993.

This form attracted Newcastle United and he moved to Tyneside in 1995. While playing for Newcastle, Crawford found his first-team opportunities limited (scoring only once in a pre-season game against Derry City) and was sent out on loan to both Rotherham United and Dundee United before signing up for Reading in March 1998, with Tommy Burns at the helm. Burns was sacked and he failed to prove himself under the new managership.

Crawford's next destination was Shelbourne back in Ireland whom he helped to four League of Ireland championships. He signed a new one-year contract on 25 February 2007 with Shels as they got their preparations in place for the new First Division season following the FAI's decision to demote the reigning champions. He was swiftly appointed captain by new manager, Dermot Keely. Crawford's last seasons at Shelbourne were hampered by numerous injuries which limited his appearances. After eight immensely successful seasons at Shelbourne, Crawford departed the club in December 2007.

Crawford was quoted as saying:

After I signed for Shels I spent some time dwelling on my career in England and it seemed to consist of nothing but injuries. I had three groin operations and bad knees, which looked serious for a while. The last two years were a write-off.

Crawford joined newly formed Sporting Fingal in February 2008, though he retired through injury at the end of their first season.

== Coaching career ==
Crawford took over as interim manager at Shamrock Rovers after Pat Scully's contract was terminated by mutual consent on 16 October 2008.

Crawford was head coach of the Republic of Ireland U18s from 2016 to 2019. He initially took charge of the home based international side which meets Wales in the John Coughlan Memorial Cup on an annual basis Crawford took the full U18 international squad from the start of the 2016-17 campaign and he was named coach of the tournament at the Slovakia Cup in April 2017.

On 5 April 2020 he was announced as the successor to Stephen Kenny as manager of the Republic of Ireland under-21 team

Crawford's first full campaign as Under-21 head coach was the 2023 UEFA European Under-21 Championship qualification where he led Ireland Under-21s to the play-offs for the first time in the Association's history. It would be a record-breaking campaign with 6 wins, 19 points and 16 goals scored in qualifying. This remains the best performance by an Ireland Under-21s team.

== Personal ==
His son James plays for Wexford F.C.

== Honours ==
Shelbourne

- League of Ireland Premier Division: 2001–02, 2003, 2004, 2006

Individual

- PFAI Young Player of the Year: 1993–94
