= Ollie Cahill =

Irish footballer (born 1975)

Personal information
- Full name: Oliver Cahill
- Date of birth: 29 September 1975 (age 51)
- Place of birth: Clonmel, County Tipperary, Ireland
- Position: Left winger

Youth career
- 1994: Clonmel Town FC

Senior career*
Years	Team	Apps	(Gls)
1994	Clonmel Town FC	?	(?)
1994–1996	Northampton Town	11	(1)
1996–2002	Cork City	193	(30)
2002–2006	Shelbourne	154	(14)
2007–2008	Drogheda United	55	(6)
2009–2010	Shamrock Rovers	45	(0)
2010	Sporting Fingal	13	(0)
2011	Bohemians	24	(0)
Total		495	(51)
- * Club domestic league appearances and goals

Ollie Cahill (born 29 September 1975 in Clonmel) is an Irish former professional footballer, primarily a left winger. Besides the Republic of Ireland, he played in England.

Cahill had a youth career with Old Bridge where he won a Munster Youth Cup thanks to a 5–0 over Turnpike Rovers in 1993. The following year he was instrumental in Clonmel Town winning the FAI Junior Cup with a 5–1 over New Ross Celtic. He then moved to English outfit Northampton Town. He later returned to Ireland for spells with Cork City, Shelbourne, Drogheda United, Shamrock Rovers, Sporting Fingal and Bohemians.

== Career ==
Cahill began his career with Clonmel Town, one of Ireland's top junior football clubs winning an FAI Junior Cup winners medal with them in 1994. He then spent two seasons at Northampton before returning home in the summer of 1996. Despite playing a friendly for Waterford United against Southampton he signed for Cork City. After six seasons at Cork he moved to Shelbourne in the summer of 2002. While he was with Shelbourne he won the League of Ireland championship in 2003, 2004 and 2006. Cahill was signed by Drogheda United on 23 December 2006. With Drogheda, Cahill won his fourth Premier Division title in five seasons and a Setanta Sports Cup winners medal in 2007.

Cahill signed for Shamrock Rovers on 16 January 2009 along with Stephen Bradley in what was Michael O'Neill's first signings. He departed Shamrock Rovers in July 2010 after making 53 appearances for the club. and soon signed for Sporting Fingal.

When Sporting went out of business in February 2011, Ollie moved to Dalymount Park where he joined Bohemians, making his competitive debut against Portadown in the Setanta Sports Cup.

== European competition ==
Cahill made 41 appearances in European competition scoring twice. He scored for Shelbourne against Olimpija Ljubljana in August 2003 and again for Drogheda United against Levadia Tallinn on 16 July 2008 in a UEFA Champions League qualifier .

== Retirement ==
Cahill retired from the game at the end of the 2011 season. On 16 September 2026, Shelbourne announced the appointment of Ollie Cahill as Head of Player Development.

== Honours ==
- League of Ireland: 5
  - Shelbourne – 2003, 2004, 2006
  - Drogheda United – 2007
  - Shamrock Rovers – 2010
- FAI Cup: 1
  - Cork City – 1998
- Setanta Sports Cup: 1
  - Drogheda United – 2007
- FAI Junior Cup: 1
  - Clonmel Town – 1994
