= David Crawley (footballer) =

Irish footballer

Personal information
- Date of birth: 20 June 1977 (age 49)
- Place of birth: Dundalk, Ireland
- Position: Defender

Youth career
- 1996–1997: Manchester City

Senior career*
Years	Team	Apps	(Gls)
1997–2002	Dundalk		
2002–2006	Shelbourne	100	(6)
2007–2008	Dundalk	62	(3)
2009	Shelbourne	27	(1)
- * Club domestic league appearances and goals

David Crawley (born 20 June 1977) is an Irish retired football player who played as a left back for Dundalk and Shelbourne during his 12-year League of Ireland career.

== Career ==
Born in Dundalk, County Louth, Crawley began his senior career with Manchester City before returning to his hometown club, Dundalk, in 1997. He won the League of Ireland First Division with Dundalk in 2001 and captained the club to their FAI Cup victory over Bohemians in 2002. He was also a member of Shelbourne's title-winning sides in the 2003, 2004 and 2006 seasons, though he only made 4 league appearances during the latter campaign. Crawley was released at the end of the 2006 season and rejoined Dundalk in 2007, who were then in the First Division. In 2008, Crawley played an integral role in Dundalk's First Division title win after they pipped Shelbourne on the final night of the season. Despite this success, Crawley was released by Dundalk at the end of the 2008 season. In January 2009, Crawley ironically rejoined Shelbourne, aiming to win his second successive First Division title. He made 30 league and cup appearances, scoring one goal, as Shelbourne finished as First Division runners-up, narrowly missing promotion to the Premier Division.

Following the end of the 2009 season, Crawley retired from football to play Gaelic football for Seán O'Mahony's in Dundalk.

== Honours ==
- League of Ireland Premier Division: 3
  - Shelbourne - 2003, 2004, 2006
- League of Ireland First Division: 2
  - Dundalk - 2000–01, 2008
- FAI Cup: 1
  - Dundalk - 2002
