= 2003 League of Ireland First Division =

League of Ireland First Division
- Season: 2003
- Champions: Dublin City
- Top goalscorer: Alan Murphy: 21 (Galway United)

The 2003 League of Ireland First Division season was the 19th season of the League of Ireland First Division and the first to be played as a summer league.

== Overview ==
The First Division was contested by 12 teams and Dublin City won the division. Each team played the other teams three times, totaling 33 games.

== Final table ==
Pos	Team	Pld	W	D	L	GF	GA	GD	Pts	Promotion or qualification
1	Dublin City	33	19	10	4	44	26	+18	67	Promoted to Premier Division
2	Bray Wanderers	33	18	10	5	59	35	+24	64	Lost promotion/relegation play-off
3	Finn Harps	33	17	11	5	52	24	+28	62	Lost promotion/relegation play-off
4	Limerick	33	16	9	8	55	38	+17	57	Lost promotion/relegation play-off
5	Kildare County	33	15	10	8	50	39	+11	55	
6	Sligo Rovers	33	11	13	9	39	39	0	46	
7	Galway United	33	10	13	10	48	53	−5	43	
8	Cobh Ramblers	33	9	11	13	33	45	−12	38	
9	Athlone Town	33	9	10	14	37	42	−5	37	
10	Dundalk	33	6	14	13	36	40	−4	32	
11	Monaghan United	33	3	9	21	28	60	−32	15 (Note: Monaghan United were deducted 3 points for fielding an ineligible player in a game against Dublin City which they lost 2–0.)	
12	Kilkenny City	33	2	6	25	25	65	−40	12	

== Promotion/relegation play-off ==
Four teams entered the promotion/relegation play-off. The second, third and fourth placed teams from the First Division were joined by the ninth placed team from the 2003 League of Ireland Premier Division.

=== Semi-final ===
1st Legs

3 December 2003	Limerick	0–0	Derry City

3 December 2003	Finn Harps	1–0	Bray Wanderers

2nd Legs

6 December 2003	Derry City	4–0	Limerick

Derry City win 4–0 on aggregate

6 December 2003	Bray Wanderers	1–2	Finn Harps

Finn Harps win 3–1 on aggregate

=== Final ===
10 December 2003	Finn Harps	0–0	Derry City

13 December 2003	Derry City	2–1 (a.e.t.)	Finn Harps
	Farren 13'; Coyle 101'		McHugh 95'

Derry City win 2–1 on aggregate and retain their place in the Premier Division.

Locations of the First Division teams

== See also ==
- 2003 League of Ireland Premier Division
