= Oliver Byrne (football chairman) =

Irish football chairman (1944–2007)

Oliver Byrne (26 July 1944 – 26 August 2007) was the CEO of Irish soccer club Shelbourne F.C.

== Early life ==
Byrne was born in Dublin In 1949, when he was five, his brother Joe brought him to see Shelbourne F.C. at their former ground in Milltown. At the time his father Andrew was chairman and controlling shareholder of Shelbourne. He was chairman from 1945 to 1956.

Ollie attended St. Josephs BNS Primary School in Terenure. While studying for a degree in Law in UCD, he played for UCD AFC but his asthma ruled soccer out as a career choice. He left college to work in the music industry, promoting new acts, such as Thin Lizzy and Skid Row and had a club, Zeros, on Mary Street. However, he soon returned to football and became involved in the workings of Shelbourne F.C., the club he supported since he was a boy.

== Career ==
=== 1977–1986 ===
Byrne was inducted on to the Shelbourne F.C. board in 1976. Tony Byrne took over the club in 1982 before Olllie assumed control again in 1986.

An always controversial figure in 1976 Byrne left his stand seat in Tolka Park and smacked a referee who had displeased him. The Football Association of Ireland suspended him for that for five years.

In January 1984, Byrne sued Shelbourne Football Club Ltd for £21,000 he had claimed he loaned the club. The following month Byrne was awarded £10,000 by the High Court.

In May 1986, Byrne sued the Evening Herald and the Evening Press for libel when the papers falsely accused Byrne and a co-accused of firearms offences.

In court, Byrne and a co-accused were convicted of receiving stolen cigarettes and had been sentenced to three years at Shelton Abbey Prison. They were each awarded £2000.

=== From 2001 ===
In September 2001, Byrne was involved in an incident with Derry City fans over a banner about former player Peter Hutton.

When the clubs played again in November the game was held up 35 minutes as Byrne argued over a clash of shirts.

In 2002 the Paul Marney affair saw Byrne and his club in the High Court when the players' "improper" registration for St. Patrick's Athletic ended in a court case which left the Inchicore club docked 15 points for further irregularities.

Byrne found himself back in court for a different matter when he was fined €100 for running a teenage disco in Tolka Park without a licence.

In March 2003, Byrne was charged with public order offences after confronting St Patrick's Athletic fans.

In May 2005, Byrne wrongly accused Shamrock Rovers fans of orchestrating trouble at the 2005 Setanta Sports Cup Final

In June, he got involved in a fight with Roddy Collins.

In August, Byrne got involved in an altercation with the Drogheda United photographer.

In November 2006, a charge of assault against Byrne was struck out after Collins accepted his apology in court.

== Death ==
Byrne was hospitalised in January 2007 for severe chest and head pains. He was hospitalised again in June 2007, which caused him to take a leave of absence as Chairman of Shelboune F.C., and died in August at age 63 from cancer.
