= Darragh Maguire =

Irish footballer

Personal information
- Date of birth: 6 February 1976 (age 50)
- Place of birth: Dublin, Ireland
- Position: Centre back

Youth career
- Glenmore Celtic

Senior career*
Years	Team	Apps	(Gls)
1999–2000	Newry Town	3	(0)
2000–2007	St Patrick's Athletic	218	(13)
2008–2009	Shamrock Rovers	43	(4)
Total		264	(17)
- * Club domestic league appearances and goals

Darragh Maguire (born 6 February 1976) is an Irish former footballer.

== Career ==
=== St Patrick's Athletic ===
Maguire was a central defender and he joined St. Pats from Newry Town F.C. He was voted St Pats' Player of the Year in 2005 season and in 2006 was awarded captaincy of the team.

Darragh scored his first league goal against Rovers at the end of the 2001/02 season. He scored his last league goal for Pats in a 1–0 win in Cork on 18 October 2005.

=== Shamrock Rovers ===
Darragh signed for the Hoops in November 2007.

He made his competitive Rovers debut on the opening day of the 2008 League of Ireland season on 8 March 2008 and scored his first goal on 3 May.

Darragh won the Shamrock Rovers Player of the Year award for 2008.

He was released by the Hoops at the end of the 2009 season.

== Honours ==
- League of Ireland Cup: 2
  - St Patrick's Athletic - 2000/01, 2003
- SRFC Player of the Year:
  - Shamrock Rovers - 2008
- St Patrick's Athletic Player of the Year (1): 2005
