= Steve Williams (footballer, born 1974) =

Welsh footballer and Gaelic football coach

Personal information
- Full name: Steven David Williams
- Date of birth: 16 October 1974 (age 52)
- Place of birth: Aberystwyth, Wales
- Position: Goalkeeper

Senior career*
Years	Team	Apps	(Gls)
1992–1993	Coventry City	0	(0)
1993–1997	Cardiff City	33	(0)
1997–1999	Dundalk	65	(0)
1999–2006	Shelbourne	214	(0)
2007	Bray Wanderers	27	(0)
2008	Sporting Fingal	22	(0)
2009	Drogheda United	24	(0)
2010	Shelbourne	2	(0)
2011	Drogheda United	0	(0)

International career
- Wales U21
- * Club domestic league appearances and goals as of 1 March 2011

Steven David Williams (born 16 October 1974, in Aberystwyth) is a Welsh coach and former association football player who has served as goalkeeping coach at association football club Dundalk and Gaelic football county teams Louth and Monaghan. He represented his country at Under-15, Under-16, Under-18 and Under-21 level in association football.

== Career ==
Williams started his career at Coventry City before moving to Cardiff City in 1993. He was handed his professional debut in October 1993 when he played in a 5–0 defeat to York City and featured a number of times throughout the remainder of the 1993–94 season but in the following years he found first team opportunities hard to come by. At the end of the 1996–97 season he was handed a chance in the first team following an injury to Tony Elliott and helped Cardiff reach the play-offs before suffering defeat to Northampton Town. Having spent four years with Cardiff, Williams was released by the club and joined Dundalk in 1997.

He moved to Shelbourne for the onset of the 1999–2000 and was a major player in their double success that season, having kept seventeen clean sheets. He was voted Early & Baldwin Player of the Year in 2002/03 and won the SWAI Goalkeeper of the Year award for calendar year 2003. Possibly his greatest hour came when he kept a clean sheet as Shels beat Hajduk Split 2–0 in a Champions League qualifier in 2004.

Steve was also prone to mistakes. He dropped the ball into his own goal on the final day of the 2006 season against Bohemians. Shelbourne, however went on to win the title. Although prone to mistakes he made some outstanding saves. Some of these include denying Bohemians an equaliser in Dalymount Park with an unbelievable save to guarantee Shels title victory. Williams made 213 league appearances during his time with Shels.

Williams departed Shelbourne following 7 successful years to join Bray Wanderers in 2007. He took his position as Bray's first choice goalkeeper making 29 league and cup appearances for the 'Seagulls'. In 2008 Williams linked up with newly formed League of Ireland entity Sporting Fingal for their inaugural campaign in the League of Ireland First Division. Williams made 25 league and cup appearances for Sporting Fingal during the 2008 season before losing his no.1 spot to St. Patrick's Athletic loanee Brendan Clarke during the latter part of the season.

On 6 February 2009, Williams signed for Drogheda United. Steve made himself at home in Drogheda almost immediately. During a penalty shootout in the annual Jim Malone Cup match against Dundalk, he saved a penalty from former Drogs hero Declan O'Brien, and George O'Callaghan to win the cup for Drogheda. Williams shared Drogheda's goalkeeping spot with Paul Skinner over the 2009 Premier Division campaign as Drogheda achieved their season goal of Premier Division survival. Williams made 24 competitive appearances for Drogheda United in 2009.

Williams rejoined his former club Shelbourne and linked up with former manager Dermot Keely on 21 January 2010. In his second spell at Shelbourne he played as back-up keeper to Dean Delany but still made 3 league and cup appearances before his departure at the end of the season.

Prior to the start of the 2011 season, Williams returned to Drogheda United.

== Coaching career ==
Williams was goalkeeping coach with Gaelic football county team Louth and coached Rory Beggan during Monaghan's 2018 All-Ireland Senior Football Championship campaign, which ended at the semi-final stage. In November 2020, Stephen Kenny asked Williams (then working with Dundalk for seven years) to coach the Republic of Ireland national football team goalkeepers when Alan Kelly asked to stay in the UK due to the COVID-19 pandemic. Williams left his role as Dundalk's goalkeeping coach in December 2020 to return as goalkeeping coach with Gaelic football county team Louth following the team's appointment of Mickey Harte as manager.

== Honours ==
=== Club ===
Shelbourne

- League of Ireland (5): 1999–2000, 2001–02, 2003, 2004, 2006
- FAI Cup (1): 2000
- Leinster Senior Cup (1): 2010

=== Individual ===
- SWAI Goalkeeper of the Year (2): 2003, 2004
