= 2005 League of Ireland First Division =

League of Ireland First Division
- Season: 2005
- Champions: Sligo Rovers
- Promoted: Dublin City
- Top goalscorer: Kieran O'Reilly: 17 (Cobh Ramblers)

The 2005 League of Ireland First Division season was the 21st season of the League of Ireland First Division.

== Overview ==
The First Division was contested by 10 teams and Sligo Rovers won the division, finishing two points clear of Dublin City. Each team played the other teams four times, totalling 36 games.

== Final table ==
Pos	Team	Pld	W	D	L	GF	GA	GD	Pts	Promotion
1	Sligo Rovers	36	15	16	5	45	27	+18	61	Promoted to Premier Division
2	Dublin City	36	15	14	7	57	34	+23	59	Promoted to Premier Division after play-off
3	Cobh Ramblers	36	15	11	10	49	40	+9	56	
4	Kilkenny City	36	15	8	13	46	35	+11	53	
5	Galway United	36	14	11	11	46	43	+3	53	
6	Dundalk	36	12	13	11	44	40	+4	49	
7	Limerick	36	13	9	14	44	49	−5	48	
8	Kildare County	36	10	11	15	33	42	−9	41	
9	Monaghan United	36	9	9	18	36	66	−30	36	
10	Athlone Town	36	6	10	20	28	52	−24	28	

== Promotion/relegation play-off ==
Dublin City who finished second in the First Division played off against Shamrock Rovers who finished eleventh in the Premier Division.

1st Leg

22 November 2005	Shamrock Rovers	1–2	Dublin City	Dalymount Park
	Molloy 58' (pen.)		Lynch 45'; McGill 86'

2nd Leg

25 November 2005	Dublin City	1–1	Shamrock Rovers	Tolka Park
	Collins 55'		Tracey 57'

Dublin City win 3–2 on aggregate and are promoted to the Premier Division.

== Top scorers ==
Player	Club	Goals
Kieran O'Reilly	Cobh Ramblers	17
Ger McCarthy	Dundalk	12 (5)
Barry Moran	Galway United	11 (3)
Robbie Collins	Dublin City	10
Tadhg Purcell	Kilkenny City	10 (2)
Paul McTiernan	Sligo Rovers	10

== See also ==
- 2005 League of Ireland Premier Division
- 2005 League of Ireland Cup
