= Stephen Geoghegan =

Irish footballer (born 1970)

Personal information
- Full name: Stephen Geoghegan
- Date of birth: 4 June 1970 (age 56)
- Place of birth: Dublin, Ireland
- Position: Striker

Youth career
- Rivermount Boys

Senior career*
Years	Team	Apps	(Gls)
1988–1991	Drogheda United	79	(17)
1991–1992	Valley Park United	?	(?)
1992–1994	Shamrock Rovers	49	(30)
1994–2003	Shelbourne	265	(109)
2004	Dundalk	14	(2)
Total		407	(158)
- * Club domestic league appearances and goals

Stephen Geoghegan (born 4 June 1970 in Dublin) is an Irish former footballer.

His first league club was Drogheda United where he won two League of Ireland First Division titles and 1 League of Ireland First Division Shield. After a spell of non league football Ray Treacy brought him back to the league when in 1992 he signed for Shamrock Rovers. The following season he helped the Hoops win the League of Ireland Premier Division title in 1993–94 where he was top league goalscorer with 23 league goals. These goals earned him both PFAI Player of the Year and the FAI National League Player of the Year

He scored a total of 34 goals in 64 appearances for Rovers before signing for Shelbourne just after the 1994 League success. He stayed with Shels until the end of the 2003 season.

During Geoghegan's time with Shels, he finished top scorer in the League of Ireland Premier Division in the 1995–96, 1996–97 and 1997–98 seasons.

He scored the winning goal in the 1996 FAI Cup Final replay at Dalymount Park against St Patrick's Athletic to deny them the league and cup 'double' and scored the second goal in the following year's final as Shels beat Derry City 2–0 to deny them the 'double'.

Geoghegan scored against SK Brann in a 1996-97 UEFA Cup Winners' Cup tie.

In 1999–2000, Geoghegan's goals helped Shels win the League and FAI Cup double for the first time in the club's history. Further league titles would be won in the 2001–02, and 2003 season with Shels. He also had a spell at Dundalk late in his career.

Geoghegan was also twice called up for the senior Republic of Ireland national football team, but was never capped.

He is the brother of fellow footballer Declan Geoghegan.

At the end of the 2012 League of Ireland season Geoghegan is seventh in the all-time League of Ireland goalscoring list with 158 league goals.

== Honours ==
- League of Ireland Premier Division: 4
  - Shamrock Rovers – 1993–94
  - Shelbourne – 1999–2000, 2001–02, 2003
- FAI Cup: 3
  - Shelbourne – 1996, 1997, 2000
- League of Ireland Cup: 1
  - Shelbourne – 1995–96
- League of Ireland First Division: 2
  - Drogheda United – 1988–89, 1990–91
- League of Ireland First Division Shield: 1
  - Drogheda United – 1991

=== Personal ===
- PFAI Player of the Year: 1
  - Shamrock Rovers – 1993–94
- League of Ireland Player of the Year: 1
  - Shamrock Rovers – 1993–94
- SWAI Personality of the Year: 1
  - Shamrock Rovers – 1993–94
