= Tony McCarthy =

Irish footballer and Osteopath

Personal information
- Full name: Anthony Paul McCarthy
- Date of birth: 9 November 1969 (age 56)
- Place of birth: Dublin, Ireland
- Position: Defender

Team information
- Current team: Shamrock Rovers (Osteopath)

Senior career*
Years	Team	Apps	(Gls)
1987–1990	UCD	77	(2)
1990–1991	Derry City	30	(1)
1991–1992	Shelbourne	32	(1)
1992–1995	Millwall	24	(1)
1994	→ Crewe Alexandra (loan)	2	(0)
1995–1997	Colchester United	86	(1)
1997–2004	Shelbourne	192	(7)

International career
1990–1991	Republic of Ireland U21	5	(0)
- * Club domestic league appearances and goals

Anthony Paul McCarthy (born 9 November 1969) is an Irish retired footballer. He is currently the physiotherapist at Shamrock Rovers.

== Career ==
Tony started his League of Ireland career with University College Dublin in 1987. During his last season at Belfield Park he was capped by the Republic of Ireland U21 in April 1990 at Oriel Park.

After two seasons, he transferred to Derry City where he gained two further U21 caps. After just one season at the Brandywell he signed for Shelbourne. His one season at Tolka Park was a successful season as Shels won the League of Ireland , Tony was named PFAI Young Player of the Year. and a further two U21 caps came his way.

Tony completed a move across the channel to Millwall FC in 1992, scoring on his debut and picking up the Man of the Match award. Following three years at Millwall, he then signed for Colchester United. After five years in England he returned to Shels where he went on to win further major honors including winning the League of Ireland three more times and also the FAI Cup.
