= Paul Marney =

English footballer

Personal information
- Date of birth: 28 April 1982 (age 44)
- Place of birth: London, England
- Position: Central midfielder

Senior career*
| Years | Team | Apps | (Gls) |
- West Ham United
- Sutton United
| 2001–2003 | St Patrick's Athletic | | |
| 2004–2008 | Dundalk | | |
- * Club domestic league appearances and goals

Paul Marney (born 28 April 1982) is an English former footballer.

== Career ==
Marney first came to prominence during the 2001–02 season when his allegedly 'improper' registration for St Patrick's Athletic resulted in the League deducting the club nine points. St Pat's took the League to arbitration and won their case (Marney had already been playing for the club for some time).
