= Michael McNamara (footballer) =

Irish Gaelic footballer

Personal information
- Born: Sligo

Sport
- Sport: Gaelic Football
- Position: Centre back
Inter-county
- Years: County
- 2007-: Sligo
Inter-county titles
- Connacht titles: 1
- NFL: 1

Michael McNamara is an Irish Gaelic footballer. He currently plays for the Sligo county team. In his first year with it, the team won the Connacht Championship for the first time since 1975 after beating Galway. A former member of the Arcadia Broncos lacrosse team, McNamara is said to bring the aggressiveness of a lacrosse defender to the pitch.

== Honours ==
- 1 Connacht Senior Football Championship (2007)
- 1 National Football League Division 4 (2009)
