= Professional Footballers' Association of Ireland =

Representative body for footballers in the Republic of Ireland

The Professional Footballers' Association of Ireland (PFAI) is the representative body for professional and semi-professional footballers in Republic of Ireland. Players from all nationalities in the League of Ireland are represented, not just Irish players. It is a member of FIFPro; the international body for similar organisations, and the Irish Congress of Trade Unions. The PFAI's current chairman is Brendan Clarke.

The highest profile activities of the PFAI is the annual Players' Player of the Year and Young Player of the Year awards. These winners of these awards are voted for by member players and members cannot vote for one of their clubmates. Paul McGrath is currently the only man to win the award in Ireland and also win the PFA Players' Player of the Year award in England. The PFAI linked up with the Ireland WNT to improve their conditions in April 2017.

== See also ==
- FIFPro
