= 2003 League of Ireland Premier Division =

League of Ireland Premier Division
- Season: 2003
- Champions: Shelbourne (11th title)
- Relegated: UCD
- UEFA Champions League: Shelbourne
- UEFA Cup: Bohemians; Longford Town
- UEFA Intertoto Cup: Cork City
- Top goalscorer: Jason Byrne: 21 (Shelbourne)

The 2003 League of Ireland Premier Division was the 19th season of the League of Ireland Premier Division. The division was made up of 10 teams. Shelbourne were champions.

== Regular season ==
The 2003 season would see the League of Ireland Premier Division change from a winter league to a summer league. Each team played four rounds of games, totalling 36 games each.

=== Final table ===
Pos	Team	Pld	W	D	L	GF	GA	GD	Pts	Qualification or relegation
1	Shelbourne (C)	36	19	12	5	52	28	+24	69	Qualification to Champions League first qualifying round
2	Bohemians	36	18	10	8	58	37	+21	64	Qualification to UEFA Cup first qualifying round
3	Cork City	36	13	14	9	43	33	+10	53	Qualification to Intertoto Cup first round
4	Longford Town	36	12	12	12	46	44	+2	48	Qualification to UEFA Cup first qualifying round (Note: Longford Town qualified for the UEFA Cup first qualifying round after winning the 2003 FAI Cup.)
5	St Patrick's Athletic	36	10	16	10	48	48	0	46	
6	Waterford United	36	11	12	13	44	58	−14	45	
7	Shamrock Rovers	36	10	14	12	45	46	−1	44	
8	Drogheda United	36	9	10	17	38	50	−12	37	
9	Derry City (O)	36	7	15	14	33	51	−18	36	Qualification to Relegation play-off
10	UCD (R)	36	7	13	16	27	39	−12	34	Relegation to League of Ireland First Division

(C) Champions; (O) Play-off winners; (R) Relegated

=== Results ===
==== Matches 1–18 ====
Home \ Away	BOH	COR	DER	DRO	LON	SHM	SHE	StP	UCD	WAT
Bohemians	—	1–1	1–1	1–0	1–1	1–1	1–0	1–2	1–0	5–1
Cork City	3–2	—	1–1	4–0	4–1	1–0	0–0	0–0	1–0	1–1
Derry City	3–0	1–0	—	0–1	2–3	1–1	2–0	2–2	1–0	4–1
Drogheda United	1–2	3–1	1–0	—	2–2	1–2	1–1	4–2	2–0	1–3
Longford Town	1–1	0–3	4–0	0–0	—	0–0	0–2	1–1	2–1	1–0
Shamrock Rovers	1–2	2–1	5–1	0–0	2–3	—	2–4	1–0	1–0	0–1
Shelbourne	2–2	1–1	1–0	3–0	3–2	1–0	—	2–2	1–1	1–1
St Patrick's Athletic	1–0	1–1	4–1	3–1	1–1	1–1	0–0	—	2–0	4–1
UCD	2–1	0–3	1–1	1–0	0–3	2–2	0–2	0–0	—	1–2
Waterford United	1–3	2–1	1–1	2–1	1–1	2–0	0–4	4–2	1–1	—

Legend: Blue = home team win; Yellow = draw; Red = away team win.

==== Matches 19–36 ====
Home \ Away	BOH	COR	DER	DRO	LON	SHM	SHE	StP	UCD	WAT
Bohemians	—	1–0	3–1	1–1	1–1	2–1	0–1	3–0	2–1	1–1
Cork City	1–2	—	1–0	1–0	0–0	2–2	1–1	0–2	0–0	2–2
Derry City	1–0	1–1	—	0–0	1–1	1–1	0–0	1–1	0–2	1–2
Drogheda United	2–0	0–1	1–1	—	0–5	0–1	0–1	2–2	0–0	3–0
Longford Town	2–4	0–1	0–1	0–2	—	1–2	2–1	2–0	2–1	0–1
Shamrock Rovers	0–0	0–2	1–1	3–2	0–1	—	1–1	3–5	2–0	1–1
Shelbourne	1–3	2–0	3–1	2–0	2–1	0–2	—	2–0	0–0	3–1
St Patrick's Athletic	2–4	0–2	2–2	3–3	1–2	1–0	0–1	—	0–0	1–0
UCD	0–1	1–1	2–0	2–1	2–0	1–1	0–1	0–0	—	3–0
Waterford United	2–1	3–0	0–1	0–2	0–0	3–3	1–2	0–0	2–2	—

Legend: Blue = home team win; Yellow = draw; Red = away team win.

=== Top scorers ===
Player	Club	Goals
(Republic of Ireland) Jason Byrne	Shelbourne	21
(Republic of Ireland) Glen Crowe	Bohemians	19
(Republic of Ireland) John O'Flynn	Cork City	14
(Republic of Ireland) Andrew Myler	Drogheda United	14
(Wales) Tony Bird	St Patrick's Athletic	14

== Promotion/relegation play-off ==
Four teams entered the promotion/relegation play-off. The second, third and fourth placed teams from the 2003 League of Ireland First Division were joined by the ninth placed team from the Premier Division.

=== Semi-final ===
1st Legs

3 December 2003	Limerick	0–0	Derry City

3 December 2003	Finn Harps	1–0	Bray Wanderers

2nd Legs

6 December 2003	Derry City	4–0	Limerick

Derry City win 4–0 on aggregate

6 December 2003	Bray Wanderers	1–2	Finn Harps

Finn Harps win 3–1 on aggregate

=== Final ===
10 December 2003	Finn Harps	0–0	Derry City

13 December 2003	Derry City	2–1 (a.e.t.)	Finn Harps
	Farren 13'; Coyle 101'		McHugh 95'

Derry City win 2–1 on aggregate and retain their place in the Premier Division.

Locations of the Premier Division teams

== Attendances ==
#	Football club	Average attendance
1	Cork City	4,147
2	St. Patrick's Athletic	2,971
3	Bohemians	2,741
4	Shelbourne	2,573
5	Waterford United	2,467
6	Derry City	2,265
7	Shamrock Rovers	2,038
8	Drogheda United	2,038
9	Longford Town	1,586
10	UCD AFC	783

== See also ==
- 2003 Shelbourne F.C. season
- 2003 League of Ireland First Division
