= 1982–83 University College Dublin A.F.C. season =

University College Dublin A.F.C.
1982–83 season
- General manager: Dr. Tony O'Neill
- Coach: Theo Dunne
- Stadium: Belfield Park
- League of Ireland: 13th
- FAI Cup: Fourth round
- League Cup: First round: Section A, 4th place (1 pt)
- Leinster Senior Cup: Third round
- Collingwood Cup: Champions
- Republic of Ireland Universities' Soccer League: Champions
- All-Ireland Universities' League Soccer Championship: Champions
- Top goalscorer: League: Ken O'Doherty (7); All: Aidan Reynolds (14)
- Biggest win: 8–1 vs RCSI; 26 January 1983, Collingwood Cup
- Biggest defeat: 7–3 vs Shamrock Rovers (A); 25 September 1982, League of Ireland Cup; 5–1 vs Finn Harps (A); 26 December 1982, League of Ireland Home

The 1982–83 season was the 86th season in the existence of University College Dublin A.F.C. It was their fourth season in the League of Ireland since their election in 1979.

== Season summary ==
The season started in July 1982 with what was UCD's 10th successive pre-season tour of Asia since 1973. This also marked the first-ever visit to Australia by an Irish soccer club, which meant that UCD had now played in every continent except South America.

On August 27, UCD played away to Home Farm in a Leinster Senior Cup third round tie. This marked the end of a three-year appearance streak for goalkeeper Jim McCabe, who had played in all of UCD's 106 senior matches since their election to the League of Ireland in 1979. He was on his honeymoon in Italy and Greece at the time, so 17-year-old new signing Paul Brogan took his place for the cup tie. Trailing 3–0 at half-time, they pulled two goals back during the second half. They eventually failed to get a dramatically late equaliser by the final whistle and were eliminated.

In September, the Students participated in the League of Ireland Cup, and were drawn in Section A with three fellow Dublin clubs: Bohemians, St Patrick's Athletic and Shamrock Rovers. UCD finished bottom of the group, having won only one point from their opening goalless draw against the Bohs.

In late January, UCD won their 33rd Collingwood Cup title. They won all of their games in Group 2, before beating Dublin University 3–1 in the semi-finals and Thomond College 1–0 in the final.

In their FAI Cup fourth round tie on 6 February, they were beaten 2–0 at home to reigning cup champions Limerick United. This particular tie was broadcast on RTÉ.

On 20 April, UCD won the Republic of Ireland Universities' Soccer League, with Keith Dignam scoring the decider against NIHE Limerick. It was their third successive national inter-Varsity title.

Two weeks later, the Students completed a grand slam of inter-Varsity trophies with a 3–2 victory over defending champions New University of Ulster (NUU) in the All-Ireland Universities' League Soccer Championship match.

== First team squad ==
Players' ages are as of the opening day of the 1982–83 season.

#	Name	Nationality	Position	Date of birth (age)	Previous club	Signed in	Notes
Goalkeepers
	Jim McCabe	(Northern Ireland) (Republic of Ireland)	GK	1956		1975	
	Paul Brogan	(Republic of Ireland)	GK	1965	Bluebell United	1982	
	Ciaran McCormick	(Republic of Ireland)	GK	1961		1982	
Defenders
	Paul Fox	(Republic of Ireland)	LB			1977	
	Frank Perry	(Republic of Ireland)	RB			1981	
	Eugene O'Callaghan	(Republic of Ireland)	FB				
	David Thomas	(Republic of Ireland)	FB		Greystones	1982	
	Paul Dempsey	(Republic of Ireland) (England)	DF/MF	16 March 1960 (aged 22)	(England) St John's College, Cambridge	1982	
	Thomas Keane	(Republic of Ireland)	DF				
	Martin Moran	(Republic of Ireland)	DF	1957	Home Farm	1979	
	Barry Nangle	(Northern Ireland)	DF		(Northern Ireland) Limavady United	1982	
	Paul Roche	(Republic of Ireland)	DF	1965	CYM Terenure	1982	
Midfielders
	David Norman	(Canada)	DM	6 May 1962 (aged 20)	(Canada) Vancouver Whitecaps	1980	
	S. Byrne	(Republic of Ireland)	MF				
	Jim Callan	(Republic of Ireland)	MF				
	John Cullen	(Republic of Ireland)	MF		Templeogue United		
	Barry Deardon	(Canada)	MF	20 March 1963 (aged 19)	(Canada) Vancouver Whitecaps		On loan from (Canada) Vancouver Whitecaps
	Keith Dignam	(Republic of Ireland)	MF	November 1961 (aged 20)	St Joseph's Boys A.F.C., Sallynoggin	1979	
	Paul McDermott	(Republic of Ireland)	MF				
	Mark McKenna	(Republic of Ireland)	MF		Home Farm	1982	
	Martin O'Sullivan	(Republic of Ireland)	MF			1981	
	Aidan Reynolds	(Republic of Ireland)	MF		Shelbourne (youth squad)	1980	
	Gerry Scully	(Republic of Ireland)	MF			1979	
	Ken O'Doherty	(Republic of Ireland)	CM	30 March 1963 (aged 19)	Youth squad	1980	
	Peter Lorimer	(Scotland)	AM	14 December 1946 (aged 35)	(Canada) Vancouver Whitecaps	Jan 1983	On loan from (Canada) Vancouver Whitecaps
Attackers
	David Cassidy	(Republic of Ireland)	FW	1956	Reserve squad	1979	
	Joe Hanrahan	(Republic of Ireland)	FW	21 March 1964 (aged 18)	Vereker Clements	1981	
	Brendan Kelly	(Republic of Ireland)	FW			1983	
	Patrick O'Kane	(Northern Ireland)	FW		(Northern Ireland) Limavady United	1982	
	Nick Skelly	(Republic of Ireland)	FW				
Unknown
	Kevin Henry	(Republic of Ireland)					
	Robert Lawlor	(Republic of Ireland)					
	Joe McDermott	(Republic of Ireland)					
	George Strachan	(Republic of Ireland)					

== Transfers ==
=== In ===
Date	Position	Nationality	Name	Last club	Ref.
10 March 1982	DF/MF	(Republic of Ireland) (England)	Paul Dempsey	(England) St John's College, Cambridge	
October 1982	DF/MF	(Republic of Ireland)	Paul Roche		
21 January 1983	FW	(Republic of Ireland)	Brendan Kelly		

== Pre-season tour of South Asia ==
On 20 July, the UCD squad left Dublin and embarked on what was their 10th annual pre-season tour of Asia. This time, they would travel 25,000 miles to play a series of ten friendlies against club and national teams in Australia, India and Singapore.

Win Draw Loss Fixtures

21 July 1982 Friendly	UCD	3–0	Bombay G. & C.	Mumbai, India
	Skelly; O'Sullivan; Rowe

22 July 1982 Friendly	UCD	0–0	Western India XI	Mumbai, India
				Attendance: 4,000

24 July 1982 Friendly	UCD	6–0	Singapore Cricket Club	Singapore
	J. McDermott (4); Hanrahan; O'Callaghan			Stadium: Queenstown Stadium

28 July 1982 Friendly	UCD	1–3	Singapore	Singapore
	Hanrahan			Stadium: National Stadium

4 August 1982 Friendly	UCD	4–0	Western Australia	Rockingham, Australia
	J. McDermott (3); O'Sullivan

7 August 1982 Friendly	UCD	0–3	Western Australia	Perth, Australia
				Stadium: Velodrome

8 August 1982 Friendly	UCD	–	South West Association	Australia

11 August 1982 Friendly	UCD	1–0	Eastern Goldfields	Kalgoorlie, Australia
	O'Callaghan (pen.)

14 August 1982 Friendly	UCD	–	Kalgoorlie	Kalgoorlie, Australia

16 August 1982 Friendly	UCD	4–2	Perth Azzurri	Rockingham, Australia
	Skelly 30'; Hanrahan

== Competitions ==
=== Overview ===
Competition	First match	Last match	Record							
Competition	First match	Last match	Pld	W	D	L	GF	GA	GD	Win %
League of Ireland Cup	12 September 1982	25 September 1982	3	0	1	2	3	9	−6	0.00
League of Ireland	3 October 1982	3 April 1983	26	4	4	18	29	63	−34	15.38
Leinster Senior Cup	27 August 1982	27 August 1982	1	0	0	1	2	3	−1	0.00
FAI Cup	6 February 1983	6 February 1983	1	0	0	1	0	2	−2	0.00
Annual University Soccer Colours Match	30 November 1982	30 November 1982	1	0	1	0	2	2	+0	0.00
Collingwood Cup	24 January 1983	29 January 1983	5	5	0	0	19	3	+16	100.00
Republic of Ireland Universities' Soccer League		20 April 1983	1	1	0	0	1	0	+1	100.00
All-Ireland Universities' League Soccer Championship	4 May 1983	4 May 1983	1	1	0	0	3	2	+1	100.00
Total			39	11	6	22	59	84	−25	28.21

Source: Competitions

=== Leinster Senior Cup ===
27 August 1982 3rd round	Home Farm	3–2	UCD	Drumcondra, Dublin
20:00	Connolly 17'; Munroe 23'; Carty 40'		Cullen 52'; O'Callaghan (pen.) 88'	Stadium: Tolka Park; Referee: E. Farroll

=== League of Ireland Cup ===
==== First round ====
===== Section A =====
Pos	Team	Pld	W	D	L	GF	GA	GD	Pts	Qualification	StP	BOH	SHM	UCD
1	St Patrick's Athletic	3	1	2	0	2	0	+2	5	Advance to semi-finals	—	—	0–0	2–0
2	Bohemians	3	1	2	0	2	1	+1	5		0–0	—	—	—
3	Shamrock Rovers	3	1	1	1	8	5	+3	4		—	1–2	—	—
4	UCD	3	0	1	2	3	9	−6	1		—	0–0	3–7	—

Rules for classification: Group stage tiebreakers

12 September 1982 1	UCD	0–0	Bohemians	Belfield, Dublin
	Moran (yellow card) 36'; McKenna (yellow card) 61'		Doolin (red card) 77'	Stadium: Belfield Park; Referee: John Carpenter

18 September 1982 2	St Patrick's Athletic	2–0	UCD	Inchicore, Dublin
				Stadium: Richmond Park

25 September 1982 3	Shamrock Rovers	7–3	UCD	Milltown, Dublin
19:45	McDonagh; Eccles; McGowan; Clarke (3, 1 pen.); Buckley		Hanrahan; Cassidy (2)	Stadium: Glenmalure Park

=== FAI Cup ===
6 February 1983 4th round	UCD	0–2	Limerick United	Belfield, Dublin
15:00			Duggan 9'; Kennedy 26'	Stadium: Belfield Park

=== Annual University Soccer Colours Match ===
30 November 1982	Dublin Univeristy	2–2	UCD	Dublin
	Kennedy 1'; Solan 75'		Reynolds 19'; Cullen 47'	Stadium: College Park; Referee: Paddy Daly (Dublin)

=== Collingwood Cup ===
==== First round ====
===== Group 2 =====
Pos	Team	Pld	W	D	L	GF	GA	GD	Pts	Qualification	UCD	NID	SJB	RCSI
1	UCD	3	3	0	0	15	2	+13	9	Advance to semi-finals	—	—	—	—
2	NIHE Dublin	3	2	0	1	6	4	+2	6		1–4	—	—	—
3	St Joseph's Belfast	3	0	1	2	0	7	−7	1		0–3	0–4	—	—
4	RCSI	3	0	1	2	1	9	−8	1		1–8	0–1	0–0	—

Rules for classification: Group stage tiebreakers

24 January 1983 1	NIHE Dublin	1–4	UCD	Belfield, Dublin
	Gleeson		Reynolds (2); O'Sullivan (2)	Stadium: Belfield Park

25 January 1983 2	St Joseph's Belfast	0–3	UCD	Belfield, Dublin
14:00			Hanrahan; Reynolds; Roche	Stadium: Belfield Park

26 January 1983 3	RCSI	1–8	UCD	Belfield, Dublin
	Kelly		Reynolds (5); Hanrahan (3)	Stadium: Belfield Park

===== Knockout stages =====
27 January 1983 Semi-finals	Dublin University	1–3	UCD	Dublin
14:00	Humphrey 62'		O'Doherty 19' (pen.), 27'; Cullen 64'	Stadium: College Park

29 January 1983 Final	UCD	1–0	Thomond College
	Reynolds 24'

=== Republic of Ireland Universities' Soccer League ===
20 April 1983 Final	UCD	1–0	NIHE Limerick	Belfield, Dublin
	Dignam 55'			Stadium: Belfield Park

=== All-Ireland Universities' League Soccer Championship ===
4 May 1983 Final	UCD	3–2	NUU	Dundalk, County Louth
16:00	Roche 45'; O'Kane 74'; Reynolds 86'		McNamara 4'; Moore 61'	Stadium: Oriel Park

=== League of Ireland ===
==== Final table ====
Pos	Team	Pld	W	D	L	GF	GA	GD	Pts	Qualification
1	Athlone Town (C)	26	20	5	1	61	24	+37	65	Qualification to 1983–84 European Cup
2	Drogheda United	26	14	7	5	43	18	+25	49	Qualification to 1983–84 UEFA Cup
3	Dundalk	26	14	6	6	32	17	+15	48	
4	Bohemians	26	13	7	6	42	26	+16	46	
5	Shelbourne	26	13	5	8	50	45	+5	44	
6	Shamrock Rovers	26	10	8	8	39	25	+14	38	
7	St Patrick's Athletic	26	10	7	9	38	38	0	37	
8	Limerick United	26	10	5	11	43	35	+8	35	
9	Finn Harps	26	9	8	9	36	33	+3	35	
10	Waterford United	26	8	8	10	31	44	−13	32	
11	Galway United	26	6	8	12	33	44	−11	26	
12	Sligo Rovers	26	4	9	13	27	48	−21	21	Qualification to 1983–84 European Cup Winners' Cup (Note: Sligo Rovers qualified for the 1983–84 European Cup Winners' Cup after winning the 1982–83 FAI Cup final.)
13	UCD	26	4	4	18	29	63	−34	16	
14	Home Farm	26	2	3	21	24	68	−44	9	

Source: www.rsssf.com
(C) Champions

==== Results summary ====
Overall								Home						Away					
Pld	W	D	L	GF	GA	GD	Pts	W	D	L	GF	GA	GD	W	D	L	GF	GA	GD
26	4	4	18	29	63	−34	16	2	4	7	18	32	−14	2	0	11	11	31	−20

==== Results by matchday ====
Matchday	1	2	3	4	5	6	7	8	9	10	11	12	13	14	15	16	17	18	19	20	21	22	23	24	25	26
Ground	H	A	H	A	H	A	H	A	H	A	H	H	A	A	H	A	H	H	A	A	H	A	H	A	H	A
Result	L	L	L	L	D	L	W	L	L	L	D	D	L	L	W	L	L	L	W	L	L	L	L	L	D	W
Position	13	13	14	14	14	14	13	13	13	13	13	13	13	14	13	13	13	13	13	13	13	13	13	13	13	13

A = Away; H = Home; W = Win; D = Draw; L = Loss

==== Matches ====
3 October 1982 1	UCD	1–4	Bohemians	Belfield, Dublin
15:30	Cassidy 18'; O'Doherty (yellow card)	,	L. O'Brien 42'; Lawless 55'; Shelly 72'; Eviston 82'	Stadium: Belfield Park

10 October 1982 2	Home Farm	4–3	UCD	Drumcondra, Dublin
15:30	Johnstone 17'; Burke 20'; Connolly 75'; Murphy 88'	,	Reynolds 33'; Moran 45'; O'Doherty 47'	Stadium: Tolka Park

17 October 1982 3	UCD	1–3	Waterford United	Belfield, Dublin
15:30	O'Doherty 87'; Moran (yellow card); O'Sullivan (yellow card)	,	Hayes 64'; Cody 66'; Madigan 72'; Doheny (yellow card)	Stadium: Belfield Park

24 October 1982 4	Dundalk	3–0	UCD	Dundalk, County Louth
15:30		,		Stadium: Oriel Park; Referee: Seán Kinsella

31 October 1982 5	UCD	2–2	Shamrock Rovers	Belfield, Dublin
14:45	Hanrahan; O'Doherty 84'	, ,	Coady 68', 72'	Stadium: Belfield Park

7 November 1982 6	Athlone Town	5–2	UCD	Athlone, County Westmeath
14:30		,	Cassidy 30'; Moran 81'	Stadium: St Mel's Park

14 November 1982 7	UCD	2–0	Sligo Rovers	Belfield, Dublin
14:30	Reynolds 27'; Moran 72'	,		Stadium: Belfield Park

21 November 1982 8	St Patrick's Athletic	1–0	UCD	Inchicore, Dublin
14:30	Tierney 80'	,		Stadium: Richmond Park; Referee: Oliver Cooney

28 November 1982 9	UCD	2–5	Shelbourne	Belfield, Dublin
14:30	Norman 67' (pen.); Dignam 69'	,	Joyce 15', 35', 74', 88'; K. McCabe 41'	Stadium: Belfield Park

5 December 1982 10	Limerick United	3–1	UCD	Limerick
14:30	B. Moran 16'; Hulmes 57'; Morris 70'	,	Reynolds 89'	Stadium: Markets Field

12 December 1982 11	UCD	1–1	Drogheda United	Belfield, Dublin
14:30	O'Doherty 13'	,	Murray 66'	Stadium: Belfield Park; Referee: John Carpenter (Dublin)

19 December 1982 12	UCD	1–1	Galway United	Belfield, Dublin
14:30	Norman 58'	,	Duff 6'	Stadium: Belfield Park; Attendance: 69; Referee: Seán Kinsella (Dublin)

26 December 1982 13	Finn Harps	5–1	UCD	Ballybofey, County Donegal
14:15	McLaughlin 8', 51'; McElwain 23'; Bradley 53'; Sheridan 88'	,	Moran 67'	Stadium: Finn Park; Referee: Oliver Cooney (Dublin)

2 January 1983 14	Bohemians	2–0	UCD	Phibsborough, Dublin
15:30	Jameson 80'; Fox (o.g.) 82'	,	Norman (yellow card); McKenna (yellow card)	Stadium: Dalymount Park; Referee: Oliver Cooney (Dublin)

9 January 1983 15	UCD	5–2	Home Farm	Belfield, Dublin
14:30	Hanrahan 6', 35'; Cassidy 17'; Skelly 26'; O'Doherty 84', (yellow card)	,	Tate 31'; Mooney 41'; Marin (yellow card); Whelan (yellow card)	Stadium: Belfield Park; Referee: John Purcell (Dublin)

16 January 1983 16	Waterford United	2–0	UCD	Waterford
14:45	Jones (2)	,	O'Doherty (red card) 85'	Stadium: Kilcohan Park

23 January 1983 17	UCD	0–3	Dundalk	Belfield, Dublin
14:45		,	Crawley; Wright; Ralph	Stadium: Belfield Park

13 February 1983 18	UCD	0–2	Athlone Town	Belfield, Dublin
15:15		,	Meagan (red card) 78'; Wyse 80'; O'Connor	Stadium: Belfield Park

20 February 1983 19	Sligo Rovers	1–2	UCD	Sligo
15:30				Stadium: The Showgrounds

23 February 1983 20	Shamrock Rovers	1–0	UCD	Milltown, Dublin
19:45	McDonagh 75'	, ,	Dempsey (yellow card) 75'	Stadium: Glenmalure Park; Referee: Seán Kinsella (Dublin)

27 February 1983 21	UCD	2–5	St Patrick's Athletic	Belfield, Dublin
15:30	O'Doherty 86'			Stadium: Belfield Park

13 March 1983 22	Shelbourne	1–0	UCD	Drumcondra, Dublin
15:30	K. McCabe 75' (pen.)	,		Stadium: Tolka Park; Referee: John Carpenter

20 March 1983 23	UCD	0–3	Limerick United	Belfield, Dublin
15:30				Stadium: Belfield Park

27 March 1983 24	Drogheda United	2–0	UCD	Drogheda, County Louth
15:30				Stadium: United Park

1 April 1983 25	UCD	1–1	Finn Harps	Belfield, Dublin
15:30	O'Doherty (yellow card) 53'			Stadium: Belfield Park; Referee: Michael Caulfield

3 April 1983 26	Galway United	1–2	UCD	Galway
15:30	Murphy		Strachan; O'Doherty (pen.)	Stadium: Terryland Park

== Reserve Team ==
=== League of Ireland 'B' Division ===
==== Results summary ====
Overall								Home						Away					
Pld	W	D	L	GF	GA	GD	Pts	W	D	L	GF	GA	GD	W	D	L	GF	GA	GD
30	11	8	11	50	47	+3	41	5	5	5	25	24	+1	6	3	6	25	23	+2

==== Matches ====
2 October 1982 1	Bohemians 'B'	1–1	UCD 'B'	Phibsborough, Dublin
	Wilson		Roche	Stadium: Dalymount Park

9 October 1982 2	UCD 'B'	1–0	Home Farm 'B'	Belfield, Dublin
	Scully			Stadium: Belfield Park

16 October 1982 3	Waterford United 'B'	4–5	UCD 'B'	Waterford
	Grace; Madigan; Flynn; Phelan		Skelly (2); O'Sullivan	Stadium: Kilcohan Park

23 October 1982 4	UCD 'B'	1–2	Dundalk 'B'	Belfield, Dublin
	Dempsey		Reilly (pen.); Lawlor	Stadium: Belfield Park

30 October 1982 5	Shamrock Rovers 'B'	0–2	UCD 'B'	Milltown, Dublin
14:45			Roche; Skelly	Stadium: Glenmalure Park

6 November 1982 6	UCD 'B'	2–2	Athlone Town 'B'	Belfield, Dublin
14:30	O'Sullivan; McKenna		Jackson (2)	Stadium: Belfield Park

13 November 1982 7	Dublin University	1–2	UCD 'B'	Dublin
	Solan		Dempsey; Skelly	Stadium: College Park

20 November 1982 8	UCD 'B'	4–3	St Patrick's Athletic 'B'	Belfield, Dublin
	Skelly (3); O'Kane		T. Kenny; Harkin; Crowe	Stadium: Belfield Park

27 November 1982 9	Shelbourne 'B'	2–1	UCD 'B'	Drumcondra, Dublin
	Thomas (o.g.); Nugent		Skelly	Stadium: Tolka Park

4 December 1982 10	UCD 'B'	3–2	CYM	Belfield, Dublin
14:30	McDermott (2); O'Sullivan		Murray; Reddy	Stadium: Belfield Park

11 December 1982 11	Drogheda United 'B'	3–3	UCD 'B'	Drogheda, County Louth
	Kelly; Strachen; Campbell (pen.)		J. McDermott (2); Skelly	Stadium: United Park

18 December 1982 12	Tullamore Town	2–1	UCD 'B'	Tullamore, County Offaly
	Grogan; Grehan		J. McDermott

26 December 1982 13	UCD 'B'	1–1	Longford Town 'B'	Belfield, Dublin
	Dempsey (pen.)		McCormick	Stadium: Belfield Park

1 January 1983 14	UCD 'B'	0–2	Bohemians 'B'	Belfield, Dublin
			Curry; Duffy	Stadium: Belfield Park

8 January 1983 15	Home Farm 'B'	1–0	UCD 'B'	Drumcondra, Dublin
	Comerford			Stadium: Tolka Park

15 January 1983 16	UCD 'B'	1–1	Belgrove	Belfield, Dublin
	O'Callaghan		Carthy (pen.)	Stadium: Belfield Park

22 January 1983 17	Dundalk 'B'	3–0	UCD 'B'	Dundalk, County Louth
	Crawley; Wright; Ralph			Stadium: Oriel Park

29 January 1983 18	UCD 'B'	0–3	Shamrock Rovers 'B'	Belfield, Dublin
			Stiles; Hassett; Breslin	Stadium: Belfield Park

5 February 1983 19	Longford Town 'B'	1–1	UCD 'B'	Longford
				Stadium: Abbeycartron

12 February 1983 20	Athlone Town 'B'	1–3	UCD 'B'	Athlone, County Westmeath
15:15				Stadium: St Mel's Park

19 February 1983 21	UCD 'B'	3–1	Dublin University	Belfield, Dublin
	O'Callaghan; McKenna; O'Kane		Solan (pen.)	Stadium: Belfield Park

26 February 1983 22	St Patrick's Athletic 'B'	1–0	UCD 'B'	Inchicore, Dublin
	T. Kenny			Stadium: Richmond Park

12 March 1983 23	UCD 'B'	1–1	Shelbourne 'B'	Belfield, Dublin
	J. McDermott		Sweeney	Stadium: Belfield Park

16 March 1983 24	UCD 'B'	2–2	St Brendan's	Belfield, Dublin
	McDermott (2)		Browning (2)	Stadium: Belfield Park

19 March 1983 25	CYM	0–2	UCD 'B'	Terenure, Dublin
			Strachan; Barrett

26 March 1983 26	UCD 'B'	1–2	Drogheda United 'B'	Belfield, Dublin
	Skelly		Bayly (2)	Stadium: Belfield Park

2 April 1983 27	UCD 'B'	3–1	Waterford United 'B'	Belfield, Dublin
	Skelly (2); Heapes		Hale	Stadium: Belfield Park

16 April 1983 28	UCD 'B'	2–1	Tullamore Town	Belfield, Dublin
	Skelly; Byrne		Connolly	Stadium: Belfield Park

20 April 1983 29	Belgrove	3–2	UCD 'B'	Clontarf, Dublin
	Maguire; Carthy; Le Gros		Strachan (2, 1 pen.)	Stadium: Mount Prospect Avenue

23 April 1983 30	St Brendan's	0–2	UCD 'B'	Grangegorman, Dublin
			Skelly; Heapes

== Statistics ==
=== Appearances and goals ===
This table shows all of the players who have featured in a first team squad for UCD this season

No.	Pos.	Player	League of Ireland		FAI Cup		League Cup		Leinster Senior Cup		Collingwood Cup		Others (Note: Includes the Annual University Soccer Colours match, Republic of Ireland Universities' Soccer league and All-Ireland Universities' League Soccer Championship)		Total	
No.	Pos.	Player	Apps	Goals	Apps	Goals	Apps	Goals	Apps	Goals	Apps	Goals	Apps	Goals	Apps	Goals
	GK	(Northern Ireland) (Republic of Ireland) Jim McCabe	19	0	1	0	3	0	0	0	0	0	0	0	23	0
	GK	(Republic of Ireland) Paul Brogan	7	0	0	0	0	0	1	0	0	0	0	0	8	0
	GK	(Republic of Ireland) Ciaran McCormick	0	0	0	0	0	0	0	0	2	0	2	0	4	0
	DF	(Republic of Ireland) (England) Paul Dempsey	12+1	0	0+1	0	3	0	1	0	2	0	2	0	20+2	0
	DF	(Republic of Ireland) Paul Fox	18+1	0	0	0	3	0	1	0	0	0	0	0	22+1	0
	DF	(Republic of Ireland) Thomas Keane	10	0	1	0	3	0	1	0	0	0	0	0	15	0
	DF	(Republic of Ireland) Martin Moran	21+2	3	1	0	3	0	1	0	0	0	0	0	26+2	3
	DF	(Northern Ireland) Barry Nangle	5+1	0	0	0	0	0	0	0	2	0	1	0	8+1	0
	DF	(Republic of Ireland) Eugene O'Callaghan	4+4	0	0	0	0	0	1	1	0	0	0	0	5+4	1
	DF	(Republic of Ireland) Frank Perry	18	0	1	0	0+1	0	0	0	2	0	2	0	23+1	0
	DF	(Republic of Ireland) Paul Roche	3	0	0	0	0	0	0	0	2	1	1	0	6	1
	DF	(Republic of Ireland) David Thomas	0	0	0	0	3	0	0	0	0	0	1	0	4	0
	MF	(Republic of Ireland) S. Byrne	0	0	0	0	0	0	0	0	0	0	1	0	1	0
	MF	(Republic of Ireland) Jim Callan	0	0	0	0	0	0	0	0	0	0	1	0	1	0
	MF	(Republic of Ireland) John Cullen	18+2	0	0+1	0	2	0	0+1	1	2	1	2	1	24+4	3
	MF	(Canada) Barry Deardon	3+2	0	0	0	0	0	0	0	0	0	0	0	3+2	0
	MF	(Republic of Ireland) Keith Dignam	24	2	1	0	1	0	0	0	2	0	2	1	30	3
	MF	(Scotland) Peter Lorimer	3	0	1	0	0	0	0	0	0	0	0	0	4	0
	MF	(Republic of Ireland) Paul McDermott	1	0	0	0	0	0	0	0	0	0	0	0	1	0
	MF	(Republic of Ireland) Mark McKenna	4+4	0	1	0	2	0	0	0	2	0	1	0	10+4	0
	MF	(Canada) David Norman	13	3	0	0	0	0	0	0	0	0	0	0	13	3
	MF	(Republic of Ireland) Ken O'Doherty	19+1	7	1	0	1	0	0	0	2	2	1	0	24+1	9
	MF	(Republic of Ireland) Martin O'Sullivan	5+3	2	0	0	0	0	0	0	0+1	2	1+1	0	6+5	4
	MF	(Republic of Ireland) Aidan Reynolds	22+1	4	1	0	3	0	1	0	5	9	2	1	34+1	14
	MF	(Republic of Ireland) Gerry Scully	0	0	0	0	0+1	0	1	0	0	0	0	0	1+1	0
	FW	(Republic of Ireland) David Cassidy	20	3	1	0	3	2	1	0	0	0	0	0	25	5
	FW	(Republic of Ireland) Joe Hanrahan	19+2	3	1	0	3	1	0	0	2	4	1+1	0	26+3	8
	FW	(Republic of Ireland) Brendan Kelly	0+1	0	0	0	0	0	0	0	0	0	0	0	0+1	0
	FW	(Northern Ireland) Patrick O'Kane	1+2	0	0	0	0	0	0	0	0	0	1	0	2+2	0
	FW	(Republic of Ireland) Nick Skelly	6+2	1	0	0	0+1	0	0	0	0	0	0	0	6+3	1
		(Republic of Ireland) Kevin Henry	0	0	0	0	0	0	1	0	0	0	0	0	1	0
		(Republic of Ireland) Joe McDermott	0	0	0	0	0	0	1	0	0	0	0	0	1	0
		(Republic of Ireland) George Strachan	2+1	1	0	0	0	0	0	0	0	0	0	0	2+1	1

=== Top goalscorers ===
No.	Pos.	Nat.	Player	LOI	FAI Cup	League Cup	LSC	Collingwood Cup	Others (Note: Includes the Annual University Soccer Colours match, Republic of Ireland Universities' Soccer league and All-Ireland Universities' League Soccer Championship)	Total
	MF	(Republic of Ireland)	Aidan Reynolds	4	0	0	0	9	1	14
	MF	(Republic of Ireland)	Ken O'Doherty	7	0	0	0	2	0	9
	FW	(Republic of Ireland)	Joe Hanrahan	3	0	1	0	4	0	8
	FW	(Republic of Ireland)	David Cassidy	3	0	2	0	0	0	5
	MF	(Republic of Ireland)	Martin O'Sullivan	2	0	0	0	2	0	4
	MF	(Republic of Ireland)	John Cullen	0	0	0	1	1	1	3
	MF	(Republic of Ireland)	Keith Dignam	2	0	0	0	0	1	3
	DF	(Republic of Ireland)	Martin Moran	3	0	0	0	0	0	3
	MF	(Canada)	David Norman	3	0	0	0	0	0	3
	DF	(Republic of Ireland)	Eugene O'Callaghan	0	0	0	1	0	0	1
	DF	(Republic of Ireland)	Paul Roche	0	0	0	0	1	0	1
	FW	(Republic of Ireland)	Nick Skelly	1	0	0	0	0	0	1
		(Republic of Ireland)	George Strachan	1	0	0	0	0	0	1

=== Discipline ===
No.	Pos.	Player	LOI			FAI Cup			League Cup			LSC			Total		
No.	Pos.	Player	Yellow card	(yellow card) (yellow-red card)	Red card	Yellow card	(yellow card) (yellow-red card)	Red card	Yellow card	(yellow card) (yellow-red card)	Red card	Yellow card	(yellow card) (yellow-red card)	Red card	Yellow card	(yellow card) (yellow-red card)	Red card
	GK	(Northern Ireland) (Republic of Ireland) Jim McCabe	0	0	0	0	0	0	0	0	0	0	0	0	0	0	0
	GK	(Republic of Ireland) Paul Brogan	0	0	0	0	0	0	0	0	0	0	0	0	0	0	0
	GK	(Republic of Ireland) Kieran McCormick	0	0	0	0	0	0	0	0	0	0	0	0	0	0	0
	DF	(Republic of Ireland) (England) Paul Dempsey	1	0	0	0	0	0	0	0	0	0	0	0	1	0	0
	DF	(Republic of Ireland) Martin Moran	1	0	0	0	0	0	1	0	0	0	0	0	2	0	0
	MF	(Republic of Ireland) Mark McKenna	1	0	0	0	0	0	1	0	0	0	0	0	2	0	0
	MF	(Canada) David Norman	1	0	0	0	0	0	0	0	0	0	0	0	1	0	0
	MF	(Republic of Ireland) Ken O'Doherty	3	0	1	0	0	0	0	0	0	0	0	0	3	0	1
	MF	(Republic of Ireland) Martin O'Sullivan	1	0	0	0	0	0	0	0	0	0	0	0	1	0	0
Total			7	0	1	0	0	0	2	0	0	0	0	0	9	0	1
