= Paul Dempsey (presenter) =

British/Irish media sports presenter and commentator

- Born: Paul Andrew Francis Dempsey; 16 March 1960 (age 66); Marylebone, London, England
- Citizenship: British · Irish
- Occupations: Sports presenter and commentator
- Years active: 1983–present
- Spouse: Jill (m. 1996)
- Children: 2

Paul Andrew Francis Dempsey (born 16 March 1960) is a British-Irish former footballer and current TV and radio sports presenter and commentator now chiefly employed by TNT Sports where he covers football and boxing coverage, as well as TV host and commentary on Indonesian Djarum's multiplatform Mola TV. After 18 years working for Sky Sports (from late 1988 to August 2006), followed by 7 with the Dublin-based channels of Setanta Sports, Dempsey was signed by BT Sport prior to their UK launch in summer 2013.

== Early life ==
Paul Dempsey was born in Marylebone, London on 16 March 1960, to Irish parents originally from Dublin. He lived in Leicester, England between 1966 and 1977, during which time he attended St Joseph's School and then City of Leicester Boys' School; it had a notable record of success in football, with England strikers Gary Lineker and Emile Heskey among its products.

He moved back to his ancestral home, Ireland, with his family in 1977, but two years later, he enrolled at St. John's College, Cambridge, where he did a three-year English Literature course. He won two Blues and captained Cambridge in the annual football Varsity match against Oxford at Wembley in December 1981. Indeed, as a footballer in his younger years, he played in midfield, as well as in defensive positions such as sweeper and full-back.

=== UCD A.F.C. ===
Paul Dempsey
Personal information
- Positions: Defender; midfielder

Youth career
- 1976–1977: Leicester City
- 1979–1982: St John's Cambridge

Senior career*
Years	Team	Apps	(Gls)
1982–1983	UCD	13	(0)
- FC Berne
- * Club domestic league appearances and goals

In January 1982, he applied to enroll in University College Dublin's Sports Scholarship system, and the signing was confirmed on 10 March, by which time his family was living in nearby Blackrock. Dempsey then played football for UCD's soccer team during the 1982–83 League of Ireland season.

In July, he was almost immediately selected by general manager Dr. Tony O'Neill as a member of the UCD squad who embarked on the annual pre-season tour of Australia and Asia.

On 27 August, he made his competitive UCD debut in their Leinster Senior Cup third round tie against Home Farm. The Students were 3–0 down at half-time. In the second 45, they pulled two goals back, but they fell short at the final whistle and were eliminated.

Dempsey wore the captain's armband for UCD's first League of Ireland Cup Section A match, a goalless draw against Bohemians on 12 September 1982. Thirteen days later, when the Students were trailing 4–0 at half-time to Shamrock Rovers in their last group match, he first spoke to a future broadcaster colleague of his: Jim Beglin (one of his opponents, but the midfielder who would sign for Liverpool the following summer and go on to represent the Republic of Ireland 15 times before his early retirement in 1991).

On 24 October, UCD travelled to Oriel Park to play against Dundalk, while their respective 'B' teams played each other in the League of Ireland 'B' Division on the previous day at Belfield Park. Although he was initially named on the senior team's panel, Dempsey ended up playing for the 'B' team instead. As the senior team were defeated 3–0 in County Louth, he scored in their 'B' team's 2–1 defeat in Belfield. Three weeks later, on 13 November, he scored again, this time in their 2–1 away victory over Dublin University. On 26 December (Saint Stephen's Day), he converted successfully from the penalty spot against Athlone Town for his third goal in League of Ireland 'B'. This earned him an eventual return to the first team panel for the match against Bohemians at Dalymount Park on 2 January 1983, which would be his first appearance in the senior team since the match at home to Waterford United on 17 October.

Later in January, he was part of the UCD squad that won the 1983 Collingwood Cup.

On 23 February, away at Shamrock Rovers, he received a yellow card for fouling Tommy Gaynor in the 74th minute, and Jacko McDonagh scored decisively for the Hoops with the resulting free kick.

On 13 March, in the 75th minute of the match away at Shelbourne, he ended up giving away another game-deciding goal when he put his hand out on the goal line to stop an incoming shot. The Shels were awarded a penalty, which Kieran McCabe converted successfully and thereby gave them the 1–0 victory at Tolka Park.

Throughout the season, Dempsey made 13 League of Ireland appearances for the Students, the last in which he came off the bench at home to Limerick United on 20 March 1983, four days after his 23rd birthday. He also came on as a substitute in UCD's FAI Cup 4th round tie against Limerick United on 6 February.

On 20 April, he returned to first-team action once more as UCD triumphed 1–0 over NIHE Limerick to win the Republic of Ireland Universities' Soccer League.

One notable teammate during that season was Peter Lorimer (former Leeds United and Scotland striker), who played three League of Ireland matches and an FAI Cup tie during his two-month loan spell from Canadian NASL club Vancouver Whitecaps before eventually returning to Elland Road in the summer for a second spell.

=== Later stints as footballer ===
Dempsey later played football in France (for FC Nantes) and Switzerland (for third-tier side FC Bern) before deciding to fully commit to a broadcasting career.

== Radio career ==
After a 1983 summer job opportunity at RTÉ's Belfast news office, he joined BBC as a graduate Trainee in late 1984. On his very first day in that job, he made tea for American boxing icon "Smokin'" Joe Frazier. After spells in BBC Radio Sport and BBC Radio News, he joined the Swiss Broadcasting Corporation, based in Bern, where he worked on radio between March 1986 and October 1987. Upon his eventual return to London, he freelanced at ITN and Channel Four News while launching Capital Radio's sports coverage with Jonathan Pearce.

== Television career ==
At Christmas 1988, Dempsey was invited to audition for the launch of Sky News, which went on air in February 1989. Dempsey was one of the first presenters to be seen on screen and became a regular presenting sports news bulletins, simultaneously establishing himself as one of the lead commentators on Sky's initial sports channel, Eurosport. He covered the 1990 World Cup working alongside Ian Darke and Peter Brackley and the 1992 Barcelona Olympics. After the merger of Sky and British Satellite Broadcasting, Sky Sports became the new dedicated subscription sports channel for the network and Dempsey made his name covering football and boxing alongside other regulars, Richard Keys and Andy Gray as part of a multi-award-winning team. When Sky captured Premier League rights for the first time Dempsey presented Sports Saturday, later Soccer Saturday, with Sue Barker. He co-created the format for the show, which has remained unchanged for over 20 years, with Senior Producer Rik Dovey, a lieutenant of then Sky Sports chief David Hill. From the mid-1990s Sky boosted their boxing coverage by signing up most of the biggest names in Britain and the United States and Dempsey fronted all of the major shows either on regular subscription or Pay Per View Channels. His main analysts were former world champions Barry McGuigan, Jim Watt, Glenn McCrory and former commonwealth champion Nicky Piper.

For a period Sky enjoyed a near monopoly on the sport's biggest names including Lennox Lewis, Evander Holyfield, Mike Tyson, Nigel Benn, Chris Eubank, Steve Collins and Naseem Hamed. Dempsey also became known to a wider international audience through regular commentary work for international agencies CSI Sports and TWI who relayed live Premier League, FA Cup, European and International football to a Worldwide audience.

He was a mainstay of their football coverage and commentated on the final day of the 1994–95 season as Blackburn Rovers clinched the title at Anfield against Liverpool and again in 1997-98 as Arsenal beat Everton at Highbury on the last day to become champions.

For 10 successive years Dempsey hosted the prestigious PFA Player of the Year Awards show from the Grosvenor House in London.

In 2002, he was a commentator for SBS covering the FIFA World Cup.

Although linked with rival networks on several occasions Dempsey remained with Sky until 2006 when he was offered the chance to return to Dublin to help launch Setanta Sports' dedicated Irish sports channel. In 2007, he was nominated for an Irish Film and Television Academy Award for his hosting of the Rugby World Cup, an event which significantly enhanced the channel's reputation.

In 2009, Setanta's Great Britain operation went into administration. However, Dempsey continued to present and commentate on Irish TV on Premier League, FA Cup, Champions League, Europa League and International football.

The 2010 FIFA World Cup gave him the chance to continue his long association, on Australian TV with SBS, the main broadcaster of the sport in the pacific region. He had previously acted as both studio anchor and commentator stretching back to 1994, along with Martin Tyler. But in 2010 as SBS developed its style and format, Dempsey was invited to host coverage from its Sydney HQ.

In September 2011, Dempsey became a presenter and commentator on subscription boxing channel BoxNation.

In 2012, Dempsey presented every game at Euro 2012 on Setanta, alongside pundits Dietmar Hamann, Gary McAllister, Dennis Wise, David O'Leary and Andy Cole. The coverage was carried into Singapore on StarHub and into Australia on Setanta Australia.

For the London Olympics Dempsey was invited to join the IOC's broadcasting arm, OBS, in their 10-channel, 3-language, 18-hour-per-day Live service, assisting former chief BBC sports producer John Shrewsbury in an editorial and production supervisor's role. Additionally he served as co-lead commentator, with John Helm, on the Men's and Women's Olympic Football tournaments.

During 2012–13 he was enlisted by ITV to help with their football coverage. For pay network Primetime he hosted the ill-fated ring return of Ricky Hatton in Manchester and, for ESPN, Wladimir Klitschko's world title defence, alongside co-host David Haye.

In 2013–14, Dempsey quickly became an established host on BT Sport for football and boxing while continuing to appear on Setanta Sports in Ireland, anchoring the Premier League highlights show and commentating on Champions League, Europa League and International football. He was also recruited once more by the IOC TV arm to work on the Sochi Olympics in Russia.

In addition to his broadcasting commitments at the FIFA World Cup 2014 in Brazil, he co-headed the operations of Union Filmes, the Brazil-based production company in which he is a partner. Main clients included SBS, ITV and BBC. He is also a founding shareholder in sports design business, ShadowmanSports.

At the start of 2015–16, he presented BT Sport's opening game, the Community Shield, Arsenal v Chelsea from Wembley with Glenn Hoddle, Rio Ferdinand and Ian Wright and on the opening weekend of the Premier League campaign was commentator at Old Trafford for Manchester United v Tottenham Hotspur in the first ever Ultra High Definition broadcast of its kind.

Throughout the season he went on to commentate on Premier League, Champions League, Europa League and Bundesliga matches for BT Sport.

As presenter of Boxing Tonight he fronted all BT Sport's boxing output, additionally acting as presenter for the return of David Haye at the O2 Arena which drew a record 3 million audience to UK TV and, for Channel 5, was anchor for the controversial Wembley Middleweight Title fight between Chris Eubank Jr. and Nick Blackwell. The summer of 2016 brought commitments at Euro 2016 and the Olympic Games in Rio.

In 2016–17, Dempsey continued as a commentator and presenter/reporter on BT Sport covering Champions League, Europa League and all Europe's top competitions with special emphasis on the Bundesliga. At the end of the season he was hired by FIFA affiliate HBS to provide commentary on the Confederations Cup in Russia, including the opening ceremony in St Petersburg. He was also confirmed as part of the commentary team for the 2018 FIFA World Cup.

In boxing, BT Sport began live broadcasting of the sport in April 2017 and Dempsey took up the role of anchor on Fight Night Live as he had during his long career on Sky Sports. He also served several other broadcasters including Channel 5.

In 2018 Dempsey continued to work mainly for BT Sport covering UEFA Champions League and Europa League plus the top leagues in England, Germany and Italy. At the 2018 FIFA World Cup he commentated from Russia on the worldwide broadcast.

In boxing, he presented and commentated on big fights all over the world, including the Alvarez v Golovkin Middleweight Title fight in Las Vegas which was BT Sport's first ever pay-per-view event and, in December, the biggest fight of 2018, the WBC Heavyweight Title fight between Deontay Wilder and Tyson Fury in Los Angeles.

Since the start of the 2025–26 season, Dempsey has been the lead English-language commentator for Como TV, as he has covered every single match involving the club in question: Como 1907.

For the 2026 FIFA World Cup in North America, he commentated on select matches for African pay TV broadcaster Sporty TV.

== Personal life ==
The earliest memory Dempsey can recall is of seeing the then-President of the United States John F. Kennedy visit Dublin in late June 1963. From an early age, he has always split his time between his native England and his ancestral home in Ireland.

Dempsey met his wife Jill, a former Aer Lingus hostess, at Ciss Madden's pub in Donnybrook (Dublin 4) in 1995, and they were engaged after four months. They then married in December 1996 and have two daughters: Yvette (born 2000) and Chantal (born 2002).

In addition to his native English, he speaks French and German, both in which he acquired proficiency during his time working in France and Switzerland during the mid-1980's. He also has fluency in Spanish and Italian.

On Sunday 17 April 1994, Dempsey competed in the 14th London Marathon, despite suffering an injury at the end of March due to over-training.
