= PFAI Young Player of the Year =

Irish football award

The Professional Footballers' Association of Ireland Players' Young Player of the Year (often called the PFAI Players' Young Player of the Year, the PFAI Young Player of the Year, or simply the Young Player of the Year) award is given to the footballer in the top-flight of Irish football, the League of Ireland, who is seen to have been the best player of the previous season and is under 23 years of age.

The shortlist is compiled by the members of the Professional Footballers' Association of Ireland (the PFAI), and then the winner is voted for by the other players in the league.

The award was first given in 1982, and was won by Bohemians player Jacko McDonagh. The most recent winner of the PFAI Young Player of the Year award was Mason Melia of St Patrick's Athletic.

UEFA Euro 2016 saw three former winners of the award making appearances at the finals tournament in France, with two of them (Wes Hoolahan of the Republic of Ireland and Niall McGinn of Northern Ireland) scoring goals for their countries.

== List of winners ==
Highlighted players are winning the award for a second time.

=== 2020s ===
| Year | Player | Club |
|---|---|---|
| 2026 | (Republic of Ireland) Tommy Lonergan | Waterford |
| 2025 | (Republic of Ireland) Owen Elding | Sligo Rovers |
| 2024 | (Republic of Ireland) Mason Melia | St Patrick's Athletic |
| 2023 | (Republic of Ireland) Sam Curtis | St Patrick's Athletic |
| 2022 | (Republic of Ireland) Andy Lyons | Shamrock Rovers |
| 2021 | (Republic of Ireland) Dawson Devoy | Bohemians |
| 2020 | (Republic of Ireland) Danny Grant | Bohemians |

=== 2010s ===
| Year | Player | Club |
|---|---|---|
| 2019 | (Republic of Ireland) Danny Mandroiu | Bohemians |
| 2018 | (Republic of Ireland) Jamie McGrath | Dundalk |
| 2017 | (Republic of Ireland) Trevor Clarke | Shamrock Rovers |
| 2016 | (Republic of Ireland) Sean Maguire | Cork City |
| 2015 | (Republic of Ireland) Brandon Miele | Shamrock Rovers |
| 2014 | (Republic of Ireland) Daryl Horgan | Dundalk |
| 2013 | (Republic of Ireland) Richie Towell | Dundalk |
| 2012 | (Republic of Ireland) Chris Forrester | St Patrick's Athletic |
| 2011 | (Republic of Ireland) Enda Stevens | Shamrock Rovers |
| 2010 | (Republic of Ireland) Shaun Williams | Sporting Fingal |

=== 2000s ===
| Year | Player | Club |
|---|---|---|
| 2009 | (Republic of Ireland) Conor Powell | Bohemians |
| 2008 | (Northern Ireland) Niall McGinn | Derry City |
| 2007 | (Republic of Ireland) Mark Quigley | St Patrick's Athletic |
| 2006 | (Northern Ireland) Kevin Deery | Derry City |
| 2005 | (Northern Ireland) Paddy McCourt | Derry City |
| 2004 | (Republic of Ireland) Daryl Murphy | Waterford United |
| 2003 | (Libya) Éamon Zayed | Bray Wanderers |
| 2003 | (Republic of Ireland) Wes Hoolahan | Shelbourne |
| 2002 | (Republic of Ireland) Robbie Martin | UCD |
| 2001 | (Republic of Ireland) Richie Foran | Shelbourne |
| 2000 | (Republic of Ireland) Richie Baker | Shelbourne |

=== 1990s ===
| Year | Player | Club |
|---|---|---|
| 1999 | (Republic of Ireland) Richie Baker | Shelbourne |
| 1998 | (Republic of Ireland) Colin Hawkins | St Patrick's Athletic |
| 1997 | (Northern Ireland) Gary Beckett | Derry City |
| 1996 | (Republic of Ireland) Michael O'Byrne | UCD |
| 1995 | (Republic of Ireland) Billy Woods | Cork City |
| 1994 | (Republic of Ireland) Jim Crawford | Bohemians |
| 1993 | (Republic of Ireland) Richie Purdy | Dundalk |
| 1992 | (Republic of Ireland) Tony McCarthy | Shelbourne |
| 1991 | (Republic of Ireland) Barry Ryan | Limerick |
| 1990 | (Republic of Ireland) Vinny Arkins / (Republic of Ireland) Tony Cousins | Shamrock Rovers / Dundalk |

=== 1980s ===
| Year | Player | Club |
|---|---|---|
| 1989 | (Northern Ireland) Liam Coyle | Derry City |
| 1988 | (Republic of Ireland) Paul McGee | Bohemians |
| 1987 | (Republic of Ireland) Martin Bayly | Sligo Rovers |
| 1986 | (Republic of Ireland) Liam O'Brien | Shamrock Rovers |
| 1985 | (Republic of Ireland) Peter Coyle | Limerick |
| 1984 | (Republic of Ireland) Joe Hanrahan | UCD |
| 1983 | (Republic of Ireland) Ken DeMange | Home Farm |
| 1982 | (Republic of Ireland) Jacko McDonagh | Bohemians |

== Breakdown of winners ==
=== Winners by club ===
| Club | Number of wins |
|---|---|
| Bohemians | 7 (1982, 1988, 1994, 2009, 2019, 2020, 2021) |
| Shamrock Rovers | 6 (1986, 1990, 2011, 2015, 2017, 2022) |
| St Patrick's Athletic | 5 (1998, 2007, 2012, 2023, 2024) |
| Dundalk | 5 (1990, 1993, 2013, 2014, 2018) |
| Derry City | 5 (1989, 1997, 2005, 2006, 2008) |
| Shelbourne | 5 (1992, 1999, 2000, 2001, 2003) |
| UCD | 3 (1984, 1996, 2002) |
| Sligo Rovers | 2 (1987, 2025) |
| Cork City | 2 (1995, 2016) |
| Limerick | 2 (1985, 1991) |
| Sporting Fingal | 1 (2010) |
| Waterford United | 1 (2004) |
| Bray Wanderers | 1 (2003) |
| Home Farm | 1 (1983) |

=== Winners by country ===
| Country | Number of wins |
|---|---|
| Republic of Ireland | 38 (1982, 1983, 1984, 1985, 1986, 1987, 1988, 1990, 1990, 1991, 1992, 1993, 1994, 1995, 1996, 1998, 1999, 2000, 2001, 2002, 2003, 2004, 2007, 2009, 2010, 2011, 2012, 2013, 2014, 2015, 2016, 2017, 2018, 2019, 2020, 2021, 2022, 2023, 2024) |
| Northern Ireland | 5 (1989, 1997, 2005, 2006, 2008) |
| England | 1 (2025) |
| Libya | 1 (2003) |

== Trivia ==
- In 2000, Richie Baker became the first – and so far only – player to win the award twice. He achieved this feat by winning the award in successive seasons
- In 1990, the award was shared between Vinny Arkins and Tony Cousins. This is the only year that the award was shared.
- In 1989, Liam Coyle became the first player from outside of the Republic of Ireland to win the award.

== See also ==
- PFAI Players' Player of the Year
- PFAI Team of the Year
