= Mercy College Belfast =

Coordinates: 54.62441°N 5.97260°W

Mercy College, Belfast

Location
- Bilston Road; Belfast, BT14 7QR; Northern Ireland

Information
- Type: Secondary School
- Religious affiliation: Roman Catholic
- Local authority: Education Authority (Belfast)
- Principal: Martin Moreland
- Staff: 70 approx.
- Gender: Co-educational
- Age: 11 to 19
- Enrolment: 650
- Colour
- Website: www.mercycollegebelfast.com

Mercy College is a Roman Catholic co-education secondary school situated in the Ballysillan area of north Belfast, Northern Ireland.

== Academics ==
The school provides instruction in a range of academic subjects. At GCSE A-Level, instruction is offered in Irish, History, Art, Sociology, Mathematics, Government & Politics, ICT, English Literature, Media Studies and Drama.

== See also ==
- List of secondary schools in Belfast
