= Joe Hanrahan =

Irish footballer (born 1964)

Personal information
- Date of birth: 21 March 1964 (age 62)
- Place of birth: Limerick, Ireland
- Height: 5 ft 11 in (1.80 m)
- Position: Forward

Senior career*
Years	Team	Apps	(Gls)
1981–1985	UCD	99	(11)
1985–1987	Manchester United	0	(0)
1987–1988	Shamrock Rovers	26	(5)
1988–1990	Limerick City	56	(10)
1990–1992	Derry City	50	(5)
1992–1997	Dundalk	126	(14)
1997–1998	Bohemians	9	(1)
1998–1999	Monaghan United	11	(1)
Total		377	(47)

International career
1984	League of Ireland XI	1	(0)
1986	Republic of Ireland U21	1	(0)
- * Club domestic league appearances and goals

Joe Hanrahan (born 21 March 1964) is an Irish former footballer who played during the 1980s and 1990s.

He picked up many honours, including the FAI Cup in 1983–84 and was named PFAI Young Player of the Year in the same year. He played for UCD in the 1984–85 European Cup Winners' Cup narrowly being beaten by Everton in a two-legged tie as Everton went on to win the competition, with Hanrahan nearly scoring the equaliser in the second leg.

== Career ==
Hanrahan came from a sporting family – his father had played hurling for Limerick and three of his brothers (Peter, Gary and Dave) played in the League of Ireland. He played schoolboy football with local side Vereker Clements earning five schoolboy caps for Ireland and soon attracted interest from cross-channel in the shape of Wolverhampton Wanderers.

Despite this interest from Wolves, Hanrahan decided to sign for UCD where he spent four productive years. He made his League of Ireland debut on 10 September 1981 at Dundalk The highlight of his time at Belfield was the 1983–84 season where he picked up an FAI Cup winners medal, scoring "after a mazy dribble" in the replay as UCD beat Shamrock Rovers 2–1. His form was noticed by his fellow professionals and he was voted PFAI Young Player of the Year. He also gained Inter-League and Under-21 representative honours during that season. He captained the Ireland youth team that qualified for the 1982 European Championships in Finland, but was unavailable for the finals because of university examinations.

The FAI Cup win qualified UCD for the 1985 Cup Winners' Cup. Drawn against English club Everton in the first round, The Times' match preview picked out Hanrahan as a player to watch. A goalless draw at Tolka Park was followed by Everton scraping through 1–0 in the return leg at Goodison Park; Everton "went on to win the competition but they wouldn't have done had a late Joe Hanrahan shot in the second leg been a few inches lower", as Peter Reid, who played for Everton in that match, remembered 23 years later: "in the last minute a lad called Joe Hanrahan had a chance and if he'd have stuck it in we'd have been out" on the away goals rule.

In August 1985, after scoring five goals in four trial games he signed for Manchester United. He played in friendlies ahead of the 1986–87 season, but never made the breakthrough. Unsettled after two years without a competitive appearance, and despite speculation about a £40,000 transfer to Port Vale, Hanrahan's contract was cancelled and he returned to Ireland. He signed for Shamrock Rovers in 1987 and after five goals in 27 games in the clubs infamous reign at Tolka Park, he moved to his hometown club Limerick City in 1988 under the management of Billy Hamilton. They finished third in the league that season but Hamilton left during the 1989–90 season and Limerick never challenged.

Hanrahan was on the move again in 1990 where Jim McLaughlin took him up north to Derry City. His first Derry goal came in a friendly against Manchester United on the 8th of August when he netted a last minute equaliser. He won two League of Ireland Cup medals at the club, scoring in the 91 final against his old club Limerick. He played for Dundalk, until they released him in the summer of 1997. He then joined Bohemians alongside his brother Peter, a move which caused some surprise because of his age and reputation for being injury-prone, and also played for Monaghan United before retiring

== Honours ==
=== Club ===
UCD

- FAI Cup: 1984

Derry City

- League of Ireland Cup: 1990–91, 1991–92

Dundalk

- League of Ireland: 1994–95

=== Individual ===
- PFAI Young Player of the Year: 1983–84
