= Barry Ryan (footballer) =

Irish footballer

Personal information
- Date of birth: 28 August 1978 (age 48)
- Place of birth: Ennis, Ireland
- Position: Goalkeeper

Youth career
- Cloughleigh Celtic

Senior career*
Years	Team	Apps	(Gls)
1996–2002	UCD	159	(0)
2003–2004	Shamrock Rovers	28	(0)
2004	Dublin City	14	(0)
2005–2008	St Patrick's Athletic	114	(0)
2009–2010	Galway United	67	(0)
2011–2014	Limerick	53	(0)
Total		435	(0)
- * Club domestic league appearances and goals

Barry Ryan (born 28 August 1978 is an Irish retired football goalkeeper who last played for Limerick in the League of Ireland Premier Division.

== Career ==
He made his League of Ireland debut for UCD away to Sligo Rovers on 15 February 1997. Barry's previous clubs include Dublin City, Shamrock Rovers and UCD.

He made his Rovers debut on 11 April 2003 keeping a clean sheet against Drogheda United but was sacked by Shamrock Rovers later that season after testing positive for cocaine. During his time with Rovers he made 4 European appearances keeping one clean sheet playing in the UEFA Intertoto-Cup and made a total of 28 appearances.

After a 9-month ban he returned with Dublin City but could not forestall the Vikings' relegation and was dropped in favour of Robbie Horgan for the final handful of games. After Dublin City became extinct, he was signed by St. Patrick's Athletic.

Ryan was released by St. Patrick's Athletic in January 2009, and moved to Galway United.

Ryan was out of contract with the west of Ireland club before the 2010 season, but his re-signing was announced on 2 February 2010.

It was announced in December 2010 that Ryan will not be renewing his contract with Galway United but instead going to Limerick for the 2011 season.
