= Tommy Dunne (footballer, born 1972) =

Irish footballer (born 1972)

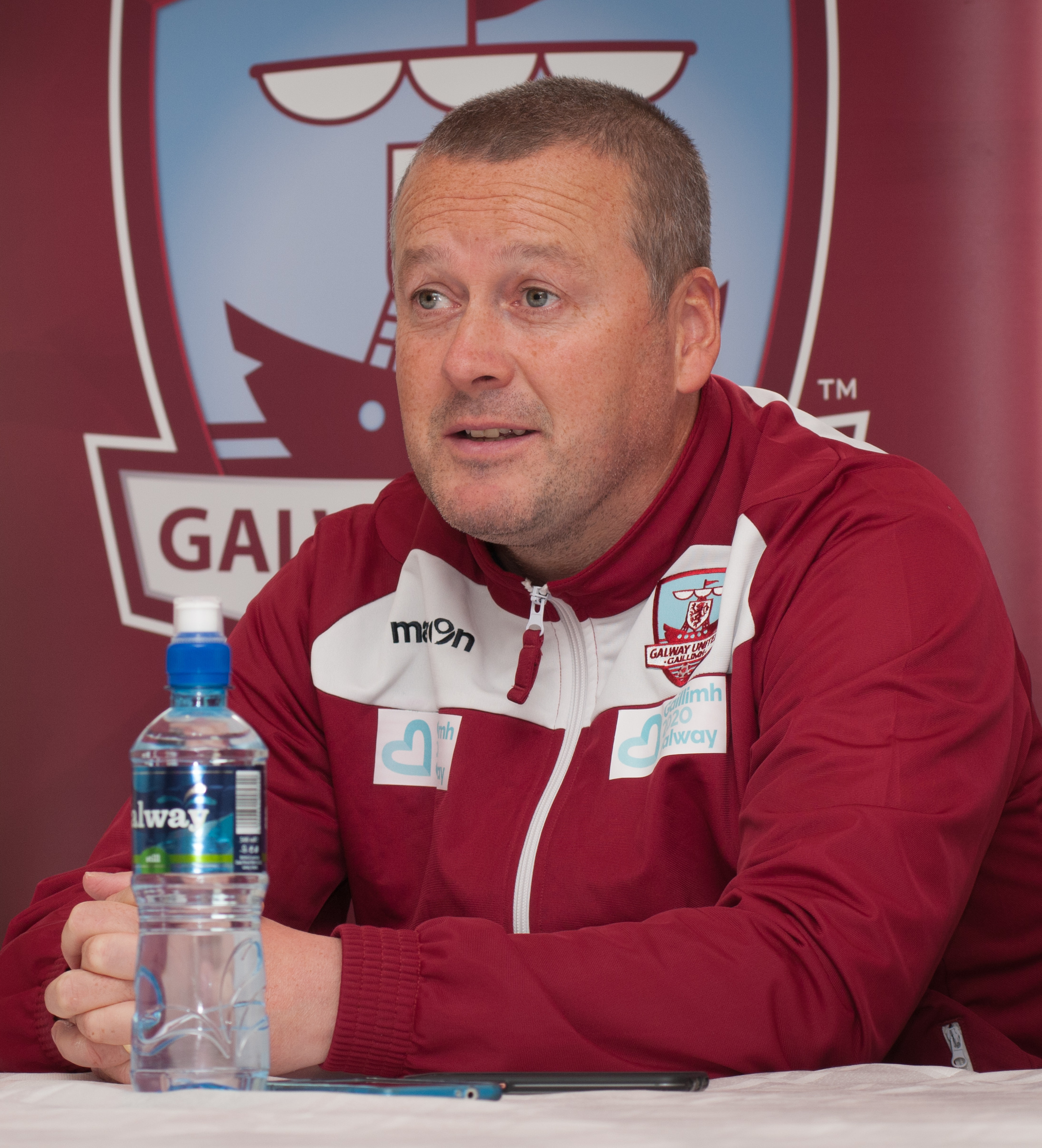
- Dunne at a press conference in 2015

Personal information
- Full name: Thomas Dunne
- Date of birth: 27 April 1972 (age 54)
- Place of birth: Dublin, Ireland
- Position: Centre back

Senior career*
Years	Team	Apps	(Gls)
1990–1991	Home Farm	5	(0)
1991–1993	Dundalk	37	(1)
1993–1995	Shelbourne	52	(3)
1995–1997	Derry City	46	(2)
1997–2002	Shamrock Rovers	107	(1)
2002–2003	Kildare County	4	(0)
2005–2007	TP-Seinäjoki	21	(2)

International career
1992–1995	Republic of Ireland U21	5	(0)

Managerial career
- 2005–2007: TP-Seinäjoki
- 2008: SJK
- 2009: Cork City (assistant)
- 2010–2013: Cork City
- 2013–2016: Galway United
- 2019–2020: SJK (U20)
- 2019–2020: SJK Akatemia
- * Club domestic league appearances and goals

Tommy Dunne (born 27 April 1972) is a former footballer. Most recently, he was the manager of SJK Akatemia in the Finnish second division, Ykkönen.

== Playing career ==
Dunne played for the Republic of Ireland national under-19 football team in the 1990 UEFA European Under-18 Football Championship finals in Hungary. He also played in the 1991 FIFA World Youth Championship .

A full back, Tommy made his League of Ireland debut for Home Farm against Longford Town on 25 November 1990. In February 1991 he joined Dundalk where he stayed until 1993 when he joined Shelbourne. After 3 years he joined Derry City where he won the League Championship.

Dunne joined Shamrock Rovers in 1997 where he stayed for 5 years making 2 appearances in European competition. His father Theo won the FAI Cup with Shels in 1960 and was assistant manager at Glenmalure Park from 1974 to 1976.

== Management career ==
Dunne managed TP-Seinäjoki in Finland for three years.

Dunne was assistant manager to Paul Doolin at Cork City in 2009.

In February 2010, he was named as the manager of Cork City.

Tommy Dunne is the son of former Shamrock Rovers Player and Coach Theo Dunne and is the first cousin of Ireland international and Aston Villa defender Richard Dunne.

On 3 August 2013 after a bad run of results Cork City released a statement reading; "Cork City FC and first team manager Tommy Dunne have parted company with immediate effect."

Dunne was appointed manager of Galway United on 26 November 2013. Tommy Dunne got Galway promoted to Premier Division in his first season in charge and guided United to the EA Sports Cup final, losing narrowly to St.Pats on penalties.

Tommy Dunne was sacked as Manager of Galway United on 29 September 2016 after Galway were defeated 5–3 by Cork City in Turners Cross. Managerless Galway United were subsequently beat 5–0 by Cork City a few days later in Eamonn Deacy Park. Galway Utd were relegated to first division thereafter in 2017.

On 30 January 2019, Dunne returned to SJK as an academy coach. He was later promoted to manager of the club's U20 team. In August 2019 it was confirmed, that also would take charge of SJK Akatemia alongside his position as U20 manager. On 13 November 2020 he left the club.

== Sources ==
- Paul Doolan; Robert Goggins. The Hoops. ISBN 0-7171-2121-6.
