= St Joseph's College, Belfast =

Coordinates: 54.5768°N 5.9115°W

St. Joseph's College

Location
- 518 Ravenhill Road; Belfast, County Down, BT6 0BY; Northern Ireland

Information
- Type: non-selective
- Motto: Achieving excellence through partnership
- Religious affiliation: Catholic
- Established: 1992
- Local authority: Education Authority (Belfast)
- Principal: Michele McCormick
- Staff: 70
- Gender: Mixed
- Age: 11 to 18
- Enrolment: 650 (approx)
- Colour
- Website: https://www.stjosephscollegebelfast.org.uk/

St Joseph's College (Irish: Colaiste Naomh Iósaf) is a Catholic maintained secondary school in Belfast, Northern Ireland. It is located in the Ravenhill area of south Belfast.

== History ==
The college opened on 1 September 1992. It was formed by the coming together of St. Monica's Girls Secondary School and St. Augustine's Boys Secondary School.

== Facilities and activities ==
The school is housed within the premises of the former St. Monica's School. However, in view of growing pupil numbers there are plans for a new larger purpose-built facility.

At GCSE A-level, pupils can work with their peers from Aquinas Diocesan Grammar School to choose courses from Art & Design, Government & Politics, Biology, Health & Life Science, Physics, Business Studies, Religious Studies, Chemistry, History, Spanish, Design & Technology, Home Economics, Sport Studies, Drama & Theatre Studies, Digital Technology, and Irish.

Pupils can engage in sporting activities including athletics, basketball, badminton, camogie, cross-country, Gaelic football, hurling, netball and soccer. The college also engages with a number of community sports organisations through the Sports within the Community scheme. These include QUB basketball club, Bredagh GAC, St. Malachy’s GAC, Rosario FC, Doyle FC and Ulster Rugby. The college has established links with a number of community groups and encourages pupils to participate in their activities. Community links exist with the Society of Saint Vincent de Paul, Daughters of Charity and Trócaire.

== Awards ==
The college has received a number of awards including the Silver Investors in People Award and the Investors in People Health and Wellbeing Award.

It gained the Green Flag by becoming an eco-friendlier environment. In 2017, it received the Aisling award for Outstanding Achievement in Education. In December 2019, it received the Diocese of Down & Connor Spirit of Catholic Education Award

It is a School of Sanctuary providing support to a large number of children of refugee families.

== See also ==
- List of secondary schools in Belfast
- List of secondary schools in Northern Ireland
