= Peter Coyle (footballer) =

Irish footballer

Personal information
- Full name: Peter Coyle
- Date of birth: 24 September 1963 (age 63)
- Place of birth: Limerick, Ireland
- Position: Defender

Senior career*
Years	Team	Apps	(Gls)
1983	Limerick United		
1983–1991	Limerick City		
1991–1994	Shelbourne		(?)

International career
1983–1985	Republic of Ireland U21	3	(0)
- * Club domestic league appearances and goals

Peter Coyle (born 24 September 1963) is an Irish former footballer.

== Club career ==
He began his career with Limerick schoolboys club Vereker Clements, and won five schoolboys international caps for Ireland in 1979.

Coyle made his League of Ireland debut for Limerick United against Home Farm on 2 January 1983. He spent eight seasons with Limerick. During this tenure at Limerick he won the PFAI Young Player of the Year award in 1984–85.

He played with Limerick City for eight seasons before leaving the club to sign for Pat Byrne at Shelbourne in January 1991. He was with Shelbourne for two seasons but left at the end of 1992–93 to take up work opportunities before returning in January 1994.

== International career ==
Coyle was capped three times by Ireland at under-21 level, making his debut in the Toulon Tournament in a 1–1 draw with France on 5 June 1983. He also captained the Irish Universities representative football team.

== Honours ==
Shelbourne

- FAI Cup: 1993

Limerick

- PFAI Young Player of the Year: 1984–85
