= List of secondary schools in Belfast =

This is a list of secondary schools and grammar schools in Belfast, Northern Ireland. The type, sector and Department of Education NI reference number is included alongside.

Secondary and grammar schools in Belfast
School name	Sector	Type	DENI reference (Note: Number used by the Department of Education (Northern Ireland) to uniquely identify an education institution.)	Ref(s)
All Saints College	Roman Catholic, maintained	Comprehensive	1230324	
Aquinas Diocesan Grammar School	Voluntary	Grammar	142-0277	
Ashfield Boys' High School	Controlled	Comprehensive	121-0015	
Ashfield Girls' High School	Controlled	Comprehensive	121-0014	
Belfast Boys' Model School	Controlled	Comprehensive	121-0022	
Belfast Model School For Girls	Controlled	Comprehensive	121-0021	
Belfast Royal Academy	Voluntary	Grammar	142-0028	
Blessed Trinity College (Note: Formed from closure of St Patrick's College (123-0026) and Little Flower Girls (123-0089) both August 2017. New School opened as Blessed Trinity College (123-0321) on September 1st 2017.)	Roman Catholic, maintained	Comprehensive	123-0321	
Bloomfield Collegiate	Controlled	Grammar	141-0315	
Breda Academy	Controlled	Comprehensive	421-0316	
Campbell College	Voluntary	Grammar	142-0020	
Coláiste Feirste	Irish speaking, maintained	Comprehensive	124-0291	
De La Salle College	Roman Catholic, maintained	Comprehensive	123-0182	
Dominican College	Voluntary	Grammar	142-0082	
Dundonald High School	Controlled	Comprehensive	421-0262	
Grosvenor Grammar School	Controlled	Grammar	141-0079	
Hunterhouse College	Voluntary	Grammar	142-0265	
Lagan College	Grant maintained, integrated	Comprehensive	426-0255	
Malone Integrated College	Grant maintained, integrated	Comprehensive	126-0294	
Mercy College Belfast	Roman Catholic, maintained	Comprehensive	123-0104	
Methodist College	Voluntary	Grammar	142-0022	
Our Lady and St Patrick's College	Voluntary	Grammar	442-0259	
Rathmore Grammar School	Voluntary	Grammar	142-0095	
St Dominic's High School	Voluntary	Grammar	142-0029	
St Genevieve's High School	Roman Catholic, maintained	Comprehensive	123-0155	
St Joseph's College	Roman Catholic, maintained	Comprehensive	123-0275	
St Louise's Comprehensive College	Roman Catholic, maintained	Comprehensive	123-0053	
St Malachy's College	Voluntary	Grammar	142-0030	
St Mary's Christian Brothers' Grammar School	Voluntary	Grammar	142-0021	
Strathearn School	Voluntary	Grammar	142-0089	
Royal Belfast Academical Institution	Voluntary	Grammar	142-0027	
Victoria College	Voluntary	Grammar	142-0264	
Wellington College	Controlled	Grammar	141-0270	

== See also ==
- List of secondary schools in Northern Ireland
- List of grammar schools in Belfast
- List of grammar schools in Northern Ireland
- List of integrated schools in Northern Ireland
- List of primary schools in Northern Ireland
