= 2023 University College Dublin A.F.C. season =

University College Dublin A.F.C.
2023 season
- Manager: Andrew Myler
- Stadium: UCD Bowl
- Premier Division: 10th
- FAI Cup: 2nd round
- Leinster Senior Cup: 4th round

The 2023 University College Dublin A.F.C. season started on 4 February when UCD lost to Shamrock Rovers in the Leinster Senior Cup. They were officially relegated to the 2024 LOI First Division on 22 September.

== Season review ==
UCD's season started on 4 February when UCD lost to Shamrock Rovers 4–1 in the Leinster Senior Cup. Their first LOI Premier Division match was on 17 February against Dundalk. They failed to win any of their first 9 Premier Division matches (17 February – 10 April). Their first win was on 14 April against Cork City. However, they would go another 10 matches without a win (22 April – 9 June). Their second win came against Sligo Rovers on 23 June. Their third win came in the first round of the FAI Cup when they defeated Cobh Ramblers to advance to the second round. They lost to Galway United in the second round of the FAI Cup. UCD were officially relegated to the 2024 LOI First Division on 22 September after a 0–0 draw against Shamrock Rovers.

== Competitions ==
=== Premier Division ===
==== Premier Division results ====
MD	Date	Opponent	Venue	Results F–A	UCD goalscorers	Attendance	Table							Ref.
MD	Date	Opponent	Venue	Results F–A	UCD goalscorers	Attendance	W	D	L	Pts	GF	GA	GD	Ref.
1	17 February	Dundalk	Oriel Park	1–1	Behan	3,412	0	1	0	1	1	1	0	
2	24 February	Sligo Rovers	UCD Bowl	2–3	Nolan, Kinsella-Bishop	716	0	1	1	1	3	4	−1	
3	3 March	Cork City	Turners Cross	0–4	—	4,857	0	1	2	1	3	8	−5	
4	6 March	Derry City	UCD Bowl	0–4	—	406	0	1	3	1	3	12	−9	
5	10 March	Drogheda United	UCD Bowl	0–1	—	426	0	1	4	1	3	13	−10	
6	17 March	Bohemians	Dalymount Park	1–2	Kinsella-Bishop	4,017	0	1	5	1	4	15	−11	
7	31 March	St Patrick's Athletic	Richmond Park	0–3	—	3,411	0	1	6	1	4	18	−14	
8	7 April	Shelbourne	UCD Bowl	0–0	—	968	0	2	6	2	4	18	−14	
9	10 April	Shamrock Rovers	Tallaght Stadium	0–3	—	4,012	0	2	7	2	4	21	−17	
10	14 April	Cork City	UCD Bowl	1–0	Behan	519	1	2	7	5	5	21	−16	
11	22 April	Sligo Rovers	The Showgrounds	1–3	Dignam	2,353	1	2	8	5	6	24	−18	
12	28 April	Bohemians	UCD Bowl	1–1	Doyle	1,567	1	3	8	6	7	25	−18	
13	1 May	Dundalk	UCD Bowl	0–2	—	759	1	3	9	6	7	27	−20	
14	5 May	Shelbourne	Tolka Park	0–1	—		1	3	10	6	7	28	−21	
15	12 May	Shamrock Rovers	UCD Bowl	0–3	—	1,673	1	3	11	6	7	31	−24	
16	19 May	Derry City	Brandywell Stadium	1–4	Wells	3,350	1	3	12	6	8	35	−27	
17	26 May	Drogheda United	Weavers Park	1–3	Wells	1,629	1	3	13	6	9	38	−29	
18	2 June	St Patrick's Athletic	UCD Bowl	1–3	Kinsella-Bishop	1,129	1	3	14	6	10	41	−31	
19	5 June	Dundalk	Oriel Park	1–4	Doyle	1,764	1	3	15	6	11	45	−34	
20	9 June	Shamrock Rovers	Tallaght Stadium	0–4	—	5,782	1	3	16	6	11	49	−38	
21	23 June	Sligo Rovers	UCD Bowl	2–1	Clarke, Doyle	304	2	3	16	9	13	50	−37	
22	30 June	St Patrick's Athletic	Richmond Park	0–7	—	3,537	2	3	17	9	13	57	−44	
23	7 July	Shelbourne	UCD Bowl	0–4	—	1,074	2	3	18	9	13	61	−48	
24	14 July	Drogheda United	UCD Bowl	1–3	Kinsella-Bishop	519	2	3	19	9	14	64	−50	
25	28 July	Bohemians	Dalymount Park	0–2	—	4,142	2	3	20	9	14	66	−52	
27	11 August	Cork City	Turners Cross	1–1	Kinsella-Bishop	2,826	2	4	20	10	15	67	−52	
28	25 August	St Patrick's Athletic	UCD Bowl	0–1	—	1,265	2	4	21	10	15	68	−53	
29	1 September	Drogheda United	Weavers Park	0–3	—	1,752	2	4	22	10	15	71	−56	
26	6 September	Derry City	UCD Bowl	0–5	—	433	2	4	23	10	15	76	−61	
30	16 September	Sligo Rovers	The Showgrounds	0–2	—	2,091	2	4	24	10	15	78	–63	
31	22 September	Shamrock Rovers	UCD Bowl	0–0	—	1,615	2	5	24	11	15	78	−63	
32	29 September	Derry City	Brandywell Stadium	0–6	—	2,500	2	5	25	11	15	84	−69	
33	12 October	Bohemians	UCD Bowl	1–2	Alonge	1,224	2	5	26	11	16	86	−70	
34	22 October	Cork City	UCD Bowl	0–2	—	317	2	5	27	11	16	88	−72	
35	27 October	Shelbourne	Tolka Park	2–3	Raggett, Kinsella-Bishop	3,446	2	5	28	11	18	91	−73	
36	3 November	Dundalk	UCD Bowl	1-5	Gallagher	594	2	5	29	11	19	96	-78	

==== League table ====
Pos	Team	Pld	W	D	L	GF	GA	GD	Pts	Qualification or relegation
6	Bohemians	36	16	10	10	53	40	+13	58	
7	Drogheda United	36	10	11	15	40	54	−14	41	
8	Sligo Rovers	36	10	7	19	36	51	−15	37	
9	Cork City (R)	36	8	7	21	35	64	−29	31	Qualification for play-off final
10	UCD (R)	36	2	5	29	19	96	−77	11	Relegation to League of Ireland First Division

Source: SSE Airtricity League,
Rules for classification: 1) Points; 2) Goal difference; 3) Goals scored.
(R) Relegated

==== Results overview ====
Overall								Home						Away					
Pld	W	D	L	GF	GA	GD	Pts	W	D	L	GF	GA	GD	W	D	L	GF	GA	GD
36	2	5	29	19	96	−77	11	2	3	13	10	40	−30	0	2	16	9	56	−47

Last updated: 3 November 2023 2023.
Source: Premier Division results

=== FAI Cup results ===
Date	Round	Opponent	Venue	Result F–A	UCD goalscorers	Attendance	Ref.
21 July	1	Cobh Ramblers	UCD Bowl	3–2	Keaney, Frahill (O.G.), Norris	174	
21 August	2	Galway United	UCD Bowl	1–5	O'Reilly (O.G.)	300	

=== Leinster Senior Cup results ===
Date	Round	Opponent	Venue	Result F–A	UCD goalscorers	Attendance	Ref.
4 February	4	Shamrock Rovers	Tallaght Stadium	1–4			

=== Overall record ===
Competition	First match	Last match	Starting round	Final position	Record							
Competition	First match	Last match	Starting round	Final position	Pld	W	D	L	GF	GA	GD	Win %
LOI Premier Division	17 February 2023	3 November 2023	Matchday 1	10th	36	2	5	29	19	96	−77	5.56
FAI Cup	23 July 2023	21 August 2023	1st round	2nd round	2	1	0	1	4	7	−3	50.00
Leinster Senior Cup	4 February 2023	4 February 2023	4th round	4th round	1	0	0	1	1	4	−3	0.00
Total					39	3	5	31	24	107	−83	7.69

Source: Competitions
