= Willie Browne =

Irish footballer

Personal information
- Date of birth: 21 February 1936
- Place of birth: Longford, Ireland
- Date of death: 14 October 2004 (aged 68)
- Position: Defender

Senior career*
Years	Team	Apps	(Gls)
1953–1957	Longford Town		
1957–1961	UCD AFC		
1961–1966	Bohemians	102	(10)

International career
1963–1964	Republic of Ireland	3	(0)
1958	Republic of Ireland B	1	(0)
- * Club domestic league appearances and goals

William Browne (21 February 1936 – 14 October 2004) was an Irish soccer player during the 1960s.

A Bohemians legend, he was the last amateur to have been capped for the full Republic of Ireland national team for 43 years until Joseph Lapira was capped against Ecuador in May 2007.

== Career ==
Born in Longford and educated at St. Mel's College, Browne began his career at UCD, where, as well as winning numerous international university caps, he was a member of 4 winning Collingwood Cup teams, and after graduating, he signed for then strictly amateur Bohemians in time for the 1961/62 season. A strong central defender, he was made captain of Bohemians in only his 2nd season at the club. He was a born leader, so much so that Bohs broke with their tradition of having a different man captain the team each year and Willie kept the captaincy for 3 consecutive seasons.

The 1963-64 season was Willie's finest as Bohs reached the semi-final of the FAI Cup and Willie won three full international caps for Ireland. He made his debut away to Austria in a European Nations Cup tie that finished 0–0. He started left back in a 2–0 defeat to Spain and earned his third and final cap at Dalymount Park in a 3–1 defeat to England.

In 1963 he was voted Personality of the Year by the Soccer Writers Association of Ireland and was also awarded the Caltex Award for soccer.

Seán Thomas arrived as manager of Bohs in 1964/65 and turned things around. The perennial strugglers finished third in the league that season with Browne excelling at the back. This was a remarkable achievement for a fully amateur team. Things got better the next season as Bohs once again finished third and ended a 19-year wait for silverware by winning both the LFA President's Cup and the Leinster Senior Cup. This was to be Willie's swansong as he retired from football at the end of the season. He made 177 appearances for Bohs in all competitions scoring 20 goals. Impressively consistent in any defensive position, Browne missed just four league games in his five seasons.

Browne died in October 2004 .
