= 1982–83 League of Ireland =

62nd season of the League of Ireland

League of Ireland
- Season: 1982–83
- Dates: 3 October 1982 – 17 April 1983
- Teams: 14
- Champions: Athlone Town (2nd title)
- European Cup: Athlone Town
- UEFA Cup: Drogheda United
- Cup Winners' Cup: Sligo Rovers
- Matches: 182
- Goals: 528 (2.9 per match)
- Top goalscorer: Noel Larkin (Athlone Town) (18 goals)

The 1982–83 League of Ireland, known as the Kentucky Fried Chicken League of Ireland for sponsorship reasons, was the 62nd season of the League of Ireland, the national league for association football in the Republic of Ireland.

== Overview ==
It was contested by 14 teams. Athlone Town won the championship and qualified for the European Cup. Drogheda United finished 2nd and represented the Republic of Ireland at the UEFA Cup the next season. Another Irish club heading to Europe were Sligo Rovers, who qualified for the Cup Winners' Cup following their FAI Cup final victory.

== Final table ==
Pos	Team	Pld	W	D	L	GF	GA	GD	Pts	Qualification
1	Athlone Town (C)	26	20	5	1	61	24	+37	65	Qualification to 1983–84 European Cup
2	Drogheda United	26	14	7	5	43	18	+25	49	Qualification to 1983–84 UEFA Cup
3	Dundalk	26	14	6	6	32	17	+15	48	
4	Bohemians	26	13	7	6	42	26	+16	46	
5	Shelbourne	26	13	5	8	50	45	+5	44	
6	Shamrock Rovers	26	10	8	8	39	25	+14	38	
7	St Patrick's Athletic	26	10	7	9	38	38	0	37	
8	Limerick United	26	10	5	11	43	35	+8	35	
9	Finn Harps	26	9	8	9	36	33	+3	35	
10	Waterford United	26	8	8	10	31	44	−13	32	
11	Galway United	26	6	8	12	33	44	−11	26	
12	Sligo Rovers	26	4	9	13	27	48	−21	21	Qualification to 1983–84 European Cup Winners' Cup (Note: Sligo Rovers qualified for the 1983–84 European Cup Winners' Cup after winning the 1982–83 FAI Cup final.)
13	UCD	26	4	4	18	29	63	−34	16	
14	Home Farm	26	2	3	21	24	68	−44	9	

Source: www.rsssf.com
(C) Champions

== Results ==
Home \ Away	ATH	BOH	DRO	DUN	FHA	GAL	HOM	LIM	SHM	SHE	SLI	StP	UCD	WAT
Athlone Town	—	3–1	2–1	2–0	3–0	4–1	3–1	2–0	2–1	2–1	4–1	3–1	5–2	4–0
Bohemians	0–1	—	0–2	0–0	1–0	2–1	1–0	1–1	3–2	4–2	2–2	1–2	2–0	2–1
Drogheda United	0–1	1–1	—	3–1	0–0	2–1	5–0	1–2	0–0	1–0	0–1	5–1	2–0	3–1
Dundalk	0–1	0–0	1–0	—	1–2	2–2	2–0	1–0	0–0	2–0	1–0	1–0	3–0	2–1
Finn Harps	3–3	0–0	2–3	0–1	—	2–4	2–0	1–1	0–1	1–0	1–1	1–1	5–1	0–1
Galway United	1–1	3–2	0–1	0–5	2–3	—	1–1	1–3	1–0	2–3	0–0	0–1	1–2	1–3
Home Farm	1–4	0–2	0–4	0–1	1–3	1–3	—	2–1	1–3	3–4	1–2	0–2	4–3	1–2
Limerick United	0–2	0–2	0–0	0–1	4–3	1–1	5–0	—	2–0	5–1	4–0	1–2	3–1	1–2
Shamrock Rovers	1–1	3–0	0–1	2–1	0–1	0–2	2–1	4–0	—	6–1	3–1	1–1	1–0	4–0
Shelbourne	4–1	1–1	0–2	2–0	1–1	0–0	3–1	4–3	2–2	—	4–3	1–0	1–0	5–2
Sligo Rovers	2–2	0–2	1–1	1–1	0–2	1–4	3–1	1–0	0–0	0–0	—	3–3	1–2	2–4
St Patrick's Athletic	1–2	0–3	1–3	1–2	2–1	3–0	1–1	1–1	1–0	1–2	3–1	—	1–0	1–1
UCD	0–2	1–4	1–1	0–3	1–1	1–1	5–2	0–3	2–2	2–5	2–0	2–5	—	1–3
Waterford United	1–1	0–5	1–1	0–0	0–1	0–0	1–1	1–2	1–1	0–3	1–0	2–2	2–0	—

Legend: Blue = home team win; Yellow = draw; Red = away team win.

== Top scorers ==
Rank	Player	Club	Goals
1	Noel Larkin	Athlone Town	18
2	Brendan Bradley	Finn Harps	17
2	Kieran McCabe	Shamrock Rovers	17
4	Kevin Cassidy	Galway United	13
4	Eugene Davis	St Patrick's Athletic	13
6	Brian Duff	Galway United	12
7	Liam Buckley	Shamrock Rovers	11
7	Tony Morris	Limerick United	11
7	Michael O'Connor	Athlone Town	11
10	Mick Fairclough	Dundalk	10
10	Jackie Jameson	Bohemians	10
10	Jim Mahon	St Patrick's Athletic	10
10	Joey Salmon	Athlone Town	10
