= Gerry McGowan =

Gerry McGowan may refer to:

- Gerry McGowan (Gaelic footballer), played for Sligo
- Gerry McGowan (Scottish footballer), played in the English Football League
