= Theo Dunne =

Irish footballer (1937–2023)

Personal information
- Full name: Thomas Dunne
- Date of birth: 22 February 1937
- Place of birth: Dublin, Ireland
- Date of death: 12 February 2023 (aged 85)
- Place of death: Dublin, Ireland
- Position: Midfielder

Youth career
- Home Farm

Senior career*
| Years | Team | Apps | (Gls) |
| 1959–1965 | Shelbourne | | |

Managerial career
- 1974–1976: Shamrock Rovers (assistant)
- 1977–1999: UCD
- * Club domestic league appearances and goals

Thomas "Theo" Dunne (22 February 1937 – 12 February 2023) was an Irish footballer who played for Shelbourne in the League of Ireland. He also managed UCD for over 20 years.

== Playing career ==
A boyhood fan of Shamrock Rovers, Dunne was overlooked by the club before joining Home Farm after a successful trial. Tiring of the travel to play for Home Farm, he was playing locally before joining the Shelbourne B team. A successful debut against Drumcondra resulted in Dunne being called up to Shelbourne's first team.

Dunne's Shelbourne career yielded a League of Ireland title in 1962 and two FAI Cup medals in 1960 and 1963 when he captained the team. He subsequently captained Shelbourne in a European Cup Winners' Cup tie with Barcelona at Camp Nou.

== Managerial career ==
After retiring from playing, Dunne became involved in management and was assistant manager of Shamrock Rovers for a two-year spell. He had a long association with UCD and was in charge when they shocked Shamrock Rovers to win the FAI Cup in 1984. Dunne also took charge of Home Farm for several seasons.

== Personal life and death ==
Dunne's nephew, Richard Dunne, made 431 Premier League appearances, including 253 for Manchester City. His son, Tommy Dunne, also won League of Ireland and FAI Cup medals before becoming involved in team management.

His grandson Gavin Molloy is also a footballer who captained Shelbourne and now plays for Aberdeen.

Dunne died on 12 February 2023, at the age of 85.

== Honours ==
=== As a player ===
Shelbourne

- League of Ireland: 1961–62
- FAI Cup: 1959–60, 1962–63 (c)

=== As a manager ===
UCD

- FAI Cup: 1983–84
- Leinster Senior Cup: 1980–81, 1994–95, 1995–96
