= Aquinas Diocesan Grammar School =

Location
- 518 Ravenhill Road; Belfast, BT6 OBY; Northern Ireland; 54.576168°N 5.907435°W

Information
- Type: Grammar School
- Motto: Veritas Liberabit (The truth shall set you free)
- Religious affiliation: Roman Catholic
- Established: 1993
- Closed: July - August
- Local authority: Education Authority (Belfast)
- Chair of Board of Governors: Mr Terry McDaid
- Principal: Dr Marie Dowling
- Chaplain: Colin Grant
- Staff: ~100
- Gender: Coeducational
- Age: 11 to 18
- Enrolment: 770
- Colour
- Sports: Basketball, Gaelic football, hockey, netball, rugby, soccer, swimming, tennis
- School Years: Year 8 - Year 14
- Website: http://aquinasgrammar.com/

Aquinas Diocesan Grammar School is a co-educational Catholic Maintained grammar school situated on the Ravenhill Road, Belfast, Northern Ireland. It teaches a range of subjects. Its main education board of choice is CCEA, but the school also uses AQA, Edexcel and WJEC for certain subjects.

== History ==
Aquinas was established by the Diocese of Down and Connor as a co-educational voluntary Grammar School. It admitted the first 110 pupils in September 1993. The current building for which the school occupies finished construction in January 2003.

== Motto and crest ==
The school's motto is Veritas Liberabit which is Latin for "The truth will set you free". The school crest is a circle half-surrounded by a 'mane' (representing the Evangelist Mark), and inside the circle in one half there is half of an ox (symbolising St Thomas Aquinas) and the symbol of the lamb and the keys.

== Academics ==
It teaches a range of subjects. Its main education board of choice is CCEA, but the school also uses AQA, Edexcel, and WJEC for certain subjects.

In 2018 it was ranked joint first in Northern Ireland for its GCSE performance with 100% of its entrants receiving five or more GCSEs at grades A* to C, including the core subjects English and Maths.

In 2019 the school was ranked 11th out of 159 secondary schools in Northern Ireland with 88.4% of its A-level students who entered the exams in 2017/18 being awarded three A*-C grades.

In 2022 the school was ranked 2nd out of the top 10 performing schools in Northern Ireland and ranked 35th state and independent school in England, Wales and Northern Ireland in Parent Power, The Sunday Times Schools Guide 2023.

== See also ==
- List of secondary schools in Belfast
