= David Norman (soccer) =

Canadian soccer player

Dave Norman
Personal information
- Full name: David McDonald Norman Jr.
- Date of birth: 6 May 1962 (age 64)
- Place of birth: Glasgow, Scotland, United Kingdom
- Height: 1.73 m (5 ft 8 in)
- Position: Midfielder

Senior career*
Years	Team	Apps	(Gls)
1981–1984	Vancouver Whitecaps	60	(3)
1980–1982	U.C.D.	43	(7)
1983–1984	Vancouver Whitecaps (indoor)	23	(16)
1985–1987	Tacoma Stars (indoor)	61	(8)
1987–1988	Winnipeg Fury	17	(6)
1988	Calgary Kickers	14	(1)
1989	Edmonton Brick Men	11	(0)
1991–1996	Vancouver 86ers	37	(1)

International career
1983–1984	Canada Olympic	6	(0)
1983–1994	Canada	49	(1)
Medal record
Representing Canada
Men's Association football
CONCACAF Championship
Winner	1985 North America
- * Club domestic league appearances and goals

David McDonald Norman Jr. (born 6 May 1962) is a Canadian former soccer player who played as a defensive midfielder.

== Club career ==
Scotland-born Norman grew up playing soccer in Coquitlam, British Columbia and went on to play 17 years as a professional. Norman began his pro career with the Vancouver Whitecaps of the North American Soccer League from 1981 to 1984, scoring three goals. During the winter months between 1980 and 1982, he played for University College Dublin A.F.C., in the League of Ireland, making 45 appearances and scoring 8 goals. Along with three Canadian teammates he was released in February 1982. Norman played one season of indoor soccer for the Whitecaps in 1983–84. He also played for the Tacoma Stars of the original Major Indoor Soccer League, and for the Winnipeg Fury, Calgary Kickers, Calgary Strikers, Edmonton Brick Men and Vancouver 86ers.

== International career ==
He made his debut for Canada in a December 1983 friendly match against Honduras and earned 49 caps, scoring 1 goal. He played all three of the country's 1986 World Cup games. Norman also played for the Canadians at the 1984 Olympics. Norman, together with three other Canadian players, Igor Vrablic, Hector Marinaro and Chris Chueden, was involved in a betting scandal at the Merlion Cup tournament in Singapore two months after the World Cup. After suspension, Norman went on to play for Canadian mens national team 19 times after the Singapore Tournament. Canada Soccer Norman played for Canada during the 1994 FIFA World Cup qualification campaign before suffering an MCL injury prior to Canada's playoff against Australia. Norman retired his international career in 1994 with his last game against Holland prior to the 1994 World Cup in the USA.

=== International goals ===
Scores and results list Canada's goal tally first.

#	Date	Venue	Opponent	Score	Result	Competition
1	2 June 1985	Dongdaemun Stadium, Seoul, South Korea	Ghana		2-1	President's Cup

== Post-playing career ==
Norman has coached for Coquitlam Metro-Ford SC since 1989 as well as coaching with the Whitecaps Prospects programs. Norman is also the soccer colour commentator on The TEAM 1040 in Vancouver for the Vancouver Whitecaps FC Major League Soccer radio broadcasts. He is the father of pro soccer player David Norman Jr. and son of Coquitlam Metro Ford Soccer Club Co-Founder David Norman. His sister Jane Norman was the first ever BC Sun Soccer Girl.

He has been involved in several positions since retirement and has been serving Group Benefit Clients from his own company – Dowco Financial – for 20+ years.

== Honours ==
Canada

- CONCACAF Championship: 1985
