= Ken O'Doherty =

Irish footballer

Personal information
- Full name: Kenneth Brendan O'Doherty
- Date of birth: 30 March 1963 (age 63)
- Place of birth: Dublin, Ireland
- Height: 6 ft 0 in (1.83 m)
- Position: Midfielder

Senior career*
| Years | Team | Apps | (Gls) |
| 1980–1985 | University College Dublin | 107 | (23) |
| 1985–1988 | Crystal Palace | 42 | (0) |
| 1988–1992 | Huddersfield Town | 65 | (1) |
| 1991 | → Exeter City (loan) | 2 | (0) |
| 1992–1995 | Shelbourne | ? | (?) |

International career
| 1985 | Republic of Ireland U21 | 1 | (0) |
- * Club domestic league appearances and goals

Kenneth Brendan O'Doherty (born 30 March 1963) is an Irish former professional footballer, who played for University College Dublin, Crystal Palace, Huddersfield Town, Exeter City and Shelbourne.

== Career ==
He earned one cap for the Republic of Ireland U21 side at Anfield.

Despite having a penalty saved in the 1984 FAI Cup final replay O'Doherty still scored the winner against Shamrock Rovers. This earned the students a place in the 1984–85 European Cup Winners' Cup where O'Doherty played twice against Everton F.C.

While playing for Huddersfield Town he had his teeth knocked out during a game, however, he refused to be subbed and played on to the final whistle.

While at Huddersfield Town he studied COBOL programming in the evening at the Huddersfield Technical College. The course he was studying was City and Guilds 417 Applications Programming.

His brother Declan played briefly for Fulham.
