= Jacko McDonagh =

Irish footballer (1962–2026)

Personal information
- Date of birth: 26 April 1962
- Place of birth: Dublin, Ireland
- Date of death: 20 September 2026 (aged 64)
- Place of death: Dublin, Ireland
- Position: Defender

Senior career*
Years	Team	Apps	(Gls)
1979–1982	Bohemians	60	(6)
1982–1985	Shamrock Rovers	77	(16)
1985–1987	Nîmes	48	(5)
1987–1988	Derry City	6	(0)
1988	Oxford United	0	(0)
1988–1991	KSV Waregem	66	(0)

International career
1982–1984	League of Ireland XI	?	(0)
1981–1983	Republic of Ireland U21	4	(0)
1983–1984	Republic of Ireland	3	(0)
- * Club domestic league appearances and goals

Jacko McDonagh (26 April 1962 – 20 September 2026) was an Irish professional footballer who played for Bohemians and Shamrock Rovers during his career in Ireland.

== Career ==
McDonagh signed for Shamrock Rovers in the summer of 1982 departing for France to sign for Marcel Domingo at Nîmes Olympique in July 1985.

He also played for K.S.V. Waregem, making 66 appearances in the Belgian First Division and three appearances in the 1988–89 UEFA Cup.

In April 1983 he played for the League of Ireland XI U21s against their Italian League counterparts who included Roberto Mancini and Gianluca Vialli in their team.

McDonagh made his international debut for Republic of Ireland in an 8–0 win over Malta in November 1983 at Dalymount Park. In all he won three senior and four U21 caps as well as Inter-League caps and youth caps. He represented Rovers six times in European competition.

In September 2011 McDonagh broke his leg playing for Ireland Veterans against England Veterans at Whitehall Stadium.

== Death ==
McDonagh died on 20 September 2026, at the age of 64.

== Honours ==
Shamrock Rovers

- League of Ireland: 1983–84, 1984–85
- FAI Cup: 1985
- Dublin City Cup: 1983–84

Individual

- PFAI Young Player of the Year: 1981–82
