= University College Dublin A.F.C. =

UCD A.F.C.
- Full name: University College Dublin Association Football Club
- Nicknames: The Students, College
- Founded: 1895; 131 years ago (as Catholic University; Medical School)
- Ground: UCD Bowl
- Capacity: 3,000 (1,500 seated)
- Manager: William O'Connor
- League: League of Ireland Premier Division
- 2026: League of Ireland First Division, 2nd of 10 (Promoted via Play-offs)
- Website: ucd.ie/soccer/
Home colours	Away colours

University College Dublin Association Football Club, known commonly as UCD, is the football team of University College Dublin. They play in the League of Ireland Premier Division. Founded in 1895, the club was elected to the League of Ireland in 1979 under the management of Dr. Tony O'Neill. Since the 2008 season they have played at the UCD Bowl, also home to the college's rugby team. The 'Students' play in bright sky blue and navy. Their reserve and freshers teams play in the Leinster Senior League. The current manager is Donegal native William O'Connor.

== History ==
=== Foundation and early years ===
University College Dublin AFC was founded in 1895 as the Catholic University Medical School Football Club and began playing regular games the following year. A First XI played college games against other universities, and a Second XI entered outside competitions. The club was founder members of the Leinster Junior League in 1896 and reached the semi-finals of the Leinster Senior Cup in 1897. The club became University College Dublin AFC when the new university annexed the Medical School in 1908. UCD won the inaugural Intervarsities competition, the Collingwood Cup, in 1914 and added the Irish Intermediate Cup the following year, beating Portadown 2–1 in a replayed final. When the Irish Free State was formed in 1921 and the new Football Association of Ireland was formed, UCD participated in the FAI Cup preliminary round against fellow non-League team Shamrock Rovers, losing 6–2 in Windy Arbour. UCD were invited to join the League of Ireland in 1922, but had to turn it down on the basis of not being able to field a team in the League of Ireland Shield in September as the academic year didn't commence until October. In 1945, they won the FAI Intermediate Cup by beating fellow future League of Ireland members Cobh Ramblers 4–2 in the final. UCD appeared in the FAI Cup in the 1930s, 1940s, and 1950s; their final appearance as a non-League outfit came in 1957, when Cork Athletic beat UCD 4–2 in the Mardyke.

=== 1970s ===
In 1970, the club was elected to the League of Ireland B Division. From 1976, they embarked on a series of landmark tours, becoming the first western football team to play in China, and following that with tours in places like India, Hong Kong, Taiwan, Malaysia, Jordan, the Philippines, Macao, the United States, Sudan, Kenya, and Australia. A second invitation to join the League of Ireland was accepted on 22 July 1979, when Cork Celtic were expelled for not having their financial affairs in order. Their first competitive game as a senior club was on 26 August, when they lost 2–1 to Drogheda United in the FAI League Cup. Theo Dunne was appointed first team coach, and apart from a brief spell at Home Farm in 1990–1994, he was in charge of first team affairs until he retired as coach in 2001. Dr. Tony O'Neill, who was General Manager when the club joined the League, remained in that role until his death in 1999.

=== 1980s ===
Chart of yearly table positions for University College Dublin in League of Ireland

The club struggled initially in the league after their election, never finishing higher than twelfth in the 16-team league, although they did win the Leinster Senior Cup in December 1980, beating St Patrick's Athletic 2–1 in the final. However, important changes within the club in 1983 marked a dramatic upturn in fortunes. The previously amateur club turned semi-pro, and players outside of the college were allowed to represent the first team.

That win saw UCD qualify for European competition – the European Cup Winners Cup – for the first time. The draw pitted them against Everton, then boasting players of the calibre of Neville Southall, Kevin Sheedy, Graeme Sharp, Peter Reid and Andy Gray. The home leg was played in Tolka Park and a crowd of 9,000 saw the Students come away with a 0–0 draw. Everton went on to win the entire competition and smashed several records in winning their nation's league title.

That season saw UCD finish fourth in the league, but they were then forced to release many of their best players due to financial difficulties. Joe Hanrahan signed for Manchester United for IR£30,000, Ken O'Doherty moved to Crystal Palace, and Alan O'Neill left for Dundalk. The team were relegated in 1985/86 with eight points, a record low in the Premier Division. Despite this, in 1987, UCD won the World Collegiate Championships in Las Cruces, New Mexico.

Promotion in 1988–89 was followed by an immediate relegation, and it was 1994–95 before UCD were to return to the Premier.

=== 1990s ===
In 1999–00, a late burst saw UCD finish fourth in the league and qualify for the Intertoto Cup. Their opponents were the Bulgarian side PFC Velbazhd Kyustendil, who boasted a couple of full Bulgaria internationals, including Ilian Stoyanov, who would go on to represent his country in the 2004 European Championships. UCD kept up their European record with a 3–3 draw in the first leg in Belfield Park before drawing 0–0 in Bulgaria to bow out on away goals.

=== 2000–2009 ===
In 2001, Paul Doolin took over as manager from former player Martin Moran. After enjoying a successful first season, the team only just avoided relegation in 2002–03 and were eleven points adrift when Doolin left to take over at Drogheda United in September 2003. Pete Mahon was installed as the new manager, and UCD lost four games in 16, closing the gap at the bottom to two points.

2004 saw more of the same, as UCD, together with Finn Harps, smashed the First Division points record and were promoted . UCD marked their return to the Premier Division with a 1–1 draw away to Shelbourne. There was a bright point in College's ultimately indifferent season when they got into the League Cup final after a last-gasp 2–1 victory over Shelbourne in the semi-final at Tolka Park. They went on to lose the final 2–1 to Derry City at Belfield Park.

2006 was one of UCD's most successful seasons in a few years. Despite being knocked out of the League Cup in the first round, The Students finished the season in 6th place and reached the quarterfinals of the FAI Cup. The performances of many in the squad did not go unnoticed, with Darren Quigley and Gary Dicker establishing themselves as under-21 internationals. Quigley then went one better and became a B international when he appeared as a substitute against Scotland B in November. UCD players also attracted interest from many British clubs. Quigley had trials at clubs across the water; Stockport County paid €56,000 for Dicker in May 2007, and Patrick Kavanagh signed for Birmingham City after impressing on trial there. The club were relegated at the end of the 2008 season, and Manager Pete Mahon wasn't offered a new contract.

=== 2009–present ===
Mahon's assistant since 2005, Martin Russell, took over as manager. With a largely new team, UCD bounced back to the top flight of Irish football at the first time of asking by securing their second First Division title, promoted after a 5–0 away win over Athlone Town in the penultimate match of the season on 30 October 2009, ahead of former Premier Division teams Shelbourne, Longford Town, Waterford United FC as well as a strong challenge from recently formed Sporting Fingal FC. In the 2009 FAI Cup, UCD's second team qualified for the first round by virtue of reaching the final of the 2008/09 FAI Intermediate Cup. They lost 2–1 at home to Arklow Town, who were drawn to play UCD's first team in the second round, also in the UCD Bowl. Despite taking the lead, Arklow, who had no eligible goalkeeper for the tie, ultimately lost 3–1.

Under Russell, UCD remained in the Airtricity League Premier Division. In 2011 the club qualified for the Setanta Sports Cup, an All-Ireland competition, where they lost to Lisburn Distillery FC 2–0 over two legs. At the beginning of the 2014 season Russell was replaced by former coach Aaron Callaghan, who had to serve out a five-game dug-out suspension awarded while at rivals Bohemian FC. UCD struggled all year, and the Students lost a two-legged relegation/promotion play-off with Galway FC in November 2014.

In July 2015, UCD became the first League of Ireland team from the second tier to progress through a European tie when they saw off Luxembourg champions F91 Dudelange in the Europa League. A lone Ryan Swan strike at the UCD Bowl gave the college their first win in a European game, and then a remarkable game at the Stade Jos Nosbaum saw Swan give UCD the lead early in the game, but after Seán Coyne was sent off, F91 scored twice before halftime through Joël Pedro and Kevin Nakache. UCD players put up the most incredible defensive display of the season, led by goalkeeper Niall Corbet and kept the second half scoreless to progress on away goals after a 2–2 aggregate draw, winning on the away goals rule. In the second round, UCD lost to a late deflected goal away to a Slovan Bratislava with three players who had played at the 2010 FIFA World Cup before losing the return leg 5–1, conceding three goals in the last ten minutes.

In 2017, the club competed in the UEFA Youth League, losing on penalties to a Molde FK side which included Erling Haaland. Haaland was introduced as a sub in the return game at the Aker Stadion and didn't score in his half-hour on the pitch, although he did score in the penalty shoot-out.

In September 2018, the club won promotion to the Premier Division after a 1–1 draw with Finn Harps F.C. which secured the Students the title. They also reached the semi-finals of the FAI Cup for the first time in 12 years only to lose 1–0 away to reigning double-champions Dundalk. However, a tumultuous 2019 season saw a number of players leave mid-season as they had finished college. A club record 12 consecutive defeats were followed by a record 10–1 defeat away to Bohemians, a match which brought about the end of Collie O'Neill's five years in charge. The club was relegated back to the First Division for 2020.

After finishing third in the table in the 2021 League of Ireland First Division, UCD defeated Treaty United and Bray Wanderers in the First Division play-offs before defeating Waterford FC 2–1 in the promotion/relegation play-off to win promotion back to the 2022 League of Ireland Premier Division.

In the 2022 League of Ireland Premier Division, UCD spent most of the season battling with Finn Harps to avoid automatic relegation. It was 15 games into the season before UCD managed their first win of the season, a 1–0 win away to Finn Harps. However, a strong finish to the season and a 3–1 win away to Finn Harps in the penultimate game of the season ensured that UCD finished in 9th place and avoided automatic relegation to the First Division, instead qualifying for the promotion/relegation playoff, where they faced Waterford FC in a repeat of the 2021 playoff. A 15th-minute goal by Tommy Lonergan, his 12th of the season in all competitions, led UCD to a 1–0 win and ensured their survival in the Premier Division.

In the 2023 season, UCD struggled badly and were relegated back to the First Division after only winning 2 games and getting 11 points, finishing 30 points behind 9th-placed Cork City. Seasons 2024 and 2025 saw The Students finish 2nd and 4th in the First Division respectively, losing out to Bray Wanderers in the play-off semi-finals on consecutive occasions.

In 2026, UCD finished 2nd behind league champions Cork City and progressed through two rounds of play-off matches to meet Drogheda United in the Promotion/Relegation play-off final at Tallaght Stadium. The Students, backed by a raucous crowd, won 2-1 with goals from Ciaran Behan and Louis Dignam. The victory ended their three year stay in the second-tier and sealed promotion back to the Premier Division for the 2027 season.

== Scholarship scheme ==
UCD AFC is noted for its scholarship scheme, which gives players the chance to combine senior football with the opportunity to earn a college degree. This was based on the North American model and created in 1979 on UCD's entry into the League of Ireland Senior Division.

== Former players ==
Many famous players have played for UCD down the years. Todd Andrews, future Chairman of CIÉ and RTÉ, and his son David Andrews, a future Minister for Foreign Affairs, both played in the Leinster Senior League for the club, as did Brian Lenihan, who scored in a 1953 FAI Cup tie against Sligo Rovers and later ran for President of Ireland. Willie Browne won numerous international university caps while at UCD, he subsequently went on to win 3 full Republic of Ireland caps, 16 amateur caps, one Republic of Ireland B cap and six Inter-League caps and captained Bohemian for 3 consecutive seasons. Former Irish international Kevin Moran, who would later play for Manchester United, Sporting de Gijón and Blackburn Rovers played in the League of Ireland B Division and was signed for Manchester United from UCD's graduate team, Pegasus. Moran also won an All-Ireland Gaelic football winner's medal with Dublin in 1976 while at UCD, as would Jason Sherlock nineteen years later. Conor Sammon, Enda Stevens and Andy Boyle also won senior international caps having started their careers with UCD.

Hugo MacNeill won the Collingwood with UCD, but went on to greater things with the Ireland national rugby union team, winning the Triple Crown in 1985 and playing in the 1987 Rugby World Cup in New Zealand. In 1983, the Leeds United legend and record goalscorer Peter Lorimer played three games before returning to England for a final spell with Leeds. Dave Norman played senior international football for Canada while at UCD and went on to play in the 1986 World Cup. Former Sky Sports and current Setanta Sports pundit Paul Dempsey played for one season in 1982/83 before taking up a job with the BBC.

Gavin Whelan (nephew of Ronnie Whelan) and Pat Jennings Jr. (son of Northern Irish international Pat Jennings) played for UCD in the mid-2000s. In August 2016, Dylan Watts signed for English Premiership champions Leicester City from UCD.

A popular rumour has it that Brazilian star Sócrates even played for the club; however, there is no evidence for this.

== Fan culture ==
UCD has a small fanbase, which included until his death the Father Ted actor Dermot Morgan, an occasional visitor to Belfield. When asked why he attended UCD matches, Dermot reportedly replied "Because I hate crowds". From 2001 to 2010, the unofficial club fanzine Student Till I Graduate published a record 91 issues. The book One Night in Dudelange – Adventures in the UEFA Europa League chronicles the club's 2015 Europa League campaign and was listed for Sports Book of the Year in 2019.

The UCD Superleague is an inter-varsity league consisting of teams predominantly made up of UCD students and alumni.

== European record ==
=== Overview ===
Competition	Matches	W	D	L	GF	GA
European Cup Winners' Cup	2	0	1	1	0	1
UEFA Intertoto Cup	2	0	2	0	3	3
UEFA Europa League	4	1	0	3	3	8
TOTAL – SENIOR	8	1	3	4	6	12
UEFA Youth League	4	2	0	4	10	11

=== Matches ===
Senior

Season	Competition	Round	Opponent	Home	Away	Aggregate
1984–85	European Cup Winners' Cup	1R	(England) Everton	0–0	0–1	0–1
2000	UEFA Intertoto Cup	1R	(Bulgaria) Velbazhd Kyustendil	3–3	0–0	3–3 (a)
2015–16	UEFA Europa League	1Q	(Luxembourg) F91 Dudelange	1–0	1–2	2–2 (a)
2015–16	UEFA Europa League	2Q	(Slovakia) Slovan Bratislava	1–5	0–1	1–6

Youth

Season	Competition	Round	Opponent	Home	Away	Aggregate
2017–18	UEFA Youth League	1R	(Norway) Molde	2–1	1–2	3–3 (p)
2024–25	UEFA Youth League	1R	(Iceland) Stjarnan	3–0	2–3	5–3
2024–25	UEFA Youth League	2R	(Kosovo) 2 Korriku	1–3	1–2	2–5

Notes

- 1R: First round
- 1Q: First qualifying round

== Players ==
=== Current squad ===
Note: Flags indicate national team as defined under FIFA eligibility rules; some limited exceptions apply. Players may hold more than one non-FIFA nationality.

No.	Pos.	Nation	Player
1	GK	IRL	Dara Kavanagh
2	DF	IRL	Sean Murphy
3	DF	IRL	Luca Cailloce
5	DF	IRL	Carl Lennox
6	DF	IRL	Adam Wells (Captain)
7	MF	IRL	Mikey McCullagh
8	MF	IRL	Louis Dignam
9	FW	IRL	Mikey Ragett
10	MF	IRL	Ciaran Behan
11	FW	IRL	Hugh Smith
12	FW	IRL	Matthew Alonge
13	MF	IRL	Jayden Goad
14	DF	IRL	Harry Curtis

No.	Pos.	Nation	Player
15	FW	IRL	Charles Akinrintayo
16	GK	IRL	Noah Douglas
17	FW	IRL	Killian Cailloce
18	DF	IRL	Niall Holohan
19	MF	IRL	Colin Bolton
20	GK	IRL	Karl Andrade
21	FW	IRL	Goodness Ogbonna
22	MF	IRL	Thomas Morley
23	MF	IRL	Ryan McBrearty
24	FW	IRL	Sam Norval
25	FW	IRL	Geordy Lavin
27	FW	IRL	Eoin Sheeran
31	MF	IRL	Stephen Mohan

=== Notable former players ===
Current players excluded. Some players spanned several decades, they are placed in the decade they made their debut for UCD.

1920s

- (Republic of Ireland) Todd Andrews
- (Republic of Ireland) Ernie Crawford

1930s

- (Republic of Ireland) Morgan Crowe

1950s

- (Republic of Ireland) David Andrews
- (Republic of Ireland) Willie Browne
- (Republic of Ireland) Brian Lenihan

1960s

- (Republic of Ireland) Ollie Byrne

1970s

- (Republic of Ireland) Kevin Moran
- (Republic of Ireland) Hugo MacNeill

1980s

- (Canada) David Norman
- (Republic of Ireland) Joe Hanrahan
- (Republic of Ireland) Dermot Keely
- (Republic of Ireland) Ken O'Doherty
- (Republic of Ireland) Alan O'Neill
- (Scotland) Peter Lorimer

1990s

- (Republic of Ireland) Clive Delaney
- (Republic of Ireland) John Martin
- (Republic of Ireland) Ciarán Martyn
- (Republic of Ireland) Tony McDonnell
- (Republic of Ireland) Barry Ryan
- (Republic of Ireland) Jason Sherlock

2000s

- (Republic of Ireland) Ian Bermingham
- (Republic of Ireland) Andy Boyle
- (Republic of Ireland) Conan Byrne
- (Republic of Ireland) Alan Cawley
- (Republic of Ireland) Paul Corry
- (Republic of Ireland) Gary Dicker
- (Republic of Ireland) Ronan Finn
- (Republic of Ireland) Ciarán Kilduff
- (Republic of Ireland) Shane McFaul
- (Republic of Ireland) David McMillan
- (Republic of Ireland) Evan McMillan
- (Republic of Ireland) Conor Sammon
- (Republic of Ireland) Enda Stevens
- (Republic of Ireland) Derek Swan

2010s

- (Republic of Ireland) Robbie Benson
- (Tunisia) Ayman Ben Mohamed
- (Republic of Ireland) Dylan Watts
- (Republic of Ireland) Simon Power
- (Republic of Ireland) Jason Byrne
- (Montserrat) Kaleem Simon
- (Republic of Ireland) Gary O'Neill
- (Republic of Ireland) Greg Sloggett
- (Republic of Ireland) Daire O'Connor
- (Republic of Ireland) Liam Scales
- (Republic of Ireland) Georgie Kelly
- (Republic of Ireland) Jason McClelland
- (Republic of Ireland) Neil Farrugia
- (Republic of Ireland) Liam Kerrigan

2020s

- (Republic of Ireland) Adam Brennan
- (Republic of Ireland) Éanna Clancy
- (Republic of Ireland) Jesse Dempsey
- (Republic of Ireland) Dylan Duffy
- (Republic of Ireland) Tommy Lonergan
- (Republic of Ireland) Alex Nolan
- (Republic of Ireland) Luke O'Regan
- (Republic of Ireland) Evan Weir
- (Republic of Ireland) Colm Whelan

== First team staff ==
As of January 2025

Position	Staff
Manager	William "Willie" O'Connor
Assistant Manager	Shane Fox
U-19 Head Coach	JJ Glynn
U-17 Head Coach	Rob Sweeney
Head of Youth Development	Albert Sugg

== Honours ==
First Team

- FAI Cup: 1
  - 1983–84
- FAI Super Cup: 1
  - 2000–01
- League of Ireland First Division: 3
  - 1994–95, 2009, 2018
- League of Ireland First Division Shield: 2
  - 1991–92, 1994–95
- Leinster Senior Cup: 3
  - 1980–81, 1994–95, 1995–96
- FAI Intermediate Cup: 1
  - 1944–45
- Irish Intermediate Cup: 1
  - 1914–15

Reserve team

- League of Ireland B Division: 1
  - 1997–98
- A Championship: 2
  - 2008, 2010

Youth team

- Dr Tony O'Neill Cup: 5
  - 2004, 2005, 2007, 2009, 2016
- Enda McGuill Cup: 1
  - 2014–15

Intervarsity

- Collingwood Cup: 47
  - 1914,1921, 1922, 1924, 1925, 1926, 1927, 1928, 1930, 1936, 1937, 1938, 1941, 1943, 1944, 1945, 1946, 1948, 1949, 1950, 1951, 1952, 1953, 1954, 1956, 1958, 1959, 1961, 1969, 1972, 1973, 1976, 1981, 1983, 1984, 1987, 1988, 1989, 1992, 1993, 1994, 2007, 2009, 2010, 2012, 2013, 2016, 2018, 2022 [Collingwood Cup Brochure]
- Harding Cup: 17
  - 1971, 1974, 1977, 1978, 1979, 1987, 1991, 1996, 1998, 2001, 2003, 2005, 2006, 2007, 2010, 2013, 2014, 2016
- Farquhar Cup: 1
  - 2012

== Club records ==
=== Most senior appearances for UCD AFC ===
(Players in bold still playing for UCD)

#	Name	Career	Appearances
1	(Republic of Ireland) Ciarán Kavanagh	1990–2002	383
2	(Republic of Ireland) Tony McDonnell	1993–2007	361
3	(Republic of Ireland) Alan Mahon	1997–2008	306
4	(Republic of Ireland) Alan McNally	1999–2009	275
5	(Republic of Ireland) Robbie Griffin	1990–1998, 2003	265
6	(Republic of Ireland) Mick O'Byrne	1993–2001	254
7	(Republic of Ireland) Éamonn McLoughlin	1994–2001	249
7	(Republic of Ireland) Darren O'Brien	1986–1997	249
9	(Republic of Ireland) Mick O'Donnell	1995–2005	240
10	(Republic of Ireland) Robert McAuley	1997–2005	237

=== Most senior goals scored for UCD AFC ===
(Players in bold still playing for UCD)

#	Name	Career	Goals
1	(Republic of Ireland) Mick O'Byrne	1993–2000	87
2	(Republic of Ireland) Darren O'Brien	1986–1997	70
3	(Republic of Ireland) Robbie Griffin	1990–1998, 2003	52
4	(Republic of Ireland) Robbie Martin	2000–2005	43
5	(Republic of Ireland) Colm Whelan	2020-2022	41
6	(Republic of Ireland) David McMillan	2008–2010, 2012–2013	40
6	(Republic of Ireland) Gary O'Neill	2015–2019	40
8	(Republic of Ireland) Jason Sherlock	1994–1998	39
8	(Republic of Ireland) Georgie Kelly	2016–2018	39
10	(Republic of Ireland) Yoyo Mahdy	2017–2020	36

=== Record wins ===
Date	Opposition	H/A	Competition	Score	Scorers
1978-02-04	Home Farm B	H	LoI B Division	9-1	Martin Moran (3), A Jennings (2), B Devlin (2), P McGovern, B O'Sullivan
1931-10-31	Trinity College	A	LSL Division 1	9-1	O'Dea (7), Donaghy (2)
2020-09-04	Wexford FC	H	LoI First Division	8-0	Yoyo Mahdy (3), Colm Whelan (3), Isaac Akinsete, Liam Kerrigan
2018-05-07	Wexford FC	A	LoI First Division	8-0	Jason McClelland (3), Yoyo Mahdy (2), Gary O'Neill (2), Liam Scales
1979-04-28	Tullamore Town	A	LoI B Division	8-0	Not reported
2016-09-30	Waterford United	A	LoI First Division	8-1	Jason Byrne (2), Daire O'Connor (2), Tomás Boyle, Georgie Kelly, Jason McClelland, Gary O'Neill
1958-12-20	Botanic	H	LSL Division 1	8-1	David Andrews (4), John Duffy (2), Paul Moy, Éamon Stubbings
2000-09-26	Bluebell United	H	League Cup Group	7-0	Ken Kilmurray (3), Eóin Bennis, Kevin Grogan, Mick O'Donnell, David Quinn
1971-12-18	Athlone Town B	H	LoI B Division	7-0	Mick Foley (2), E Semple (2), Burke, Newman, Cathal Travers
1943-01-15	Bray Unknowns	H	LSL Division 1	7-0	Not reported
1931-01-24	Drumcondra B	H	LSL Division 1	7-0	O'Dea (4), Donaghy (2), Liam Honohan
1930-02-01	Brideville B	H	LSL Division 1	7-0	Finnegan (3), Donaghy (3), O'Brien
1929-03-02	Strandville	H	LSL Division 1	7-0	Hollweck (3), Donaghy (2), Cavanagh, Dempsey

=== Record defeats ===
Date	Opposition	H/A	Competition	Score	Scorers
2019-08-16	Bohemians	A	LoI Premier Division	1-10	Jason McClelland
1920-11-14	Shelbourne	H	LSL Division 1	1-10	Jim O'Flaherty
1942-02-14	Shamrock Rovers B	A	LSL Division 1	0-9	
1947-08-30	Jacobs	A	Leinster Senior Cup Rd 1	2-10	O'Connor, M...
1937-03-13	Fearons Athletic	H	LSL Division 1	1-9	M Doherty
1957-02-02	Shelbourne B	A	Metropolitan Cup Rd 2	2-9	Hall, O'Brien
1962-09-01	Shelbourne B	A	LSL Division 1	1-8	C Deignan
1951-01-20	Jacobs	A	LSL Division 1	1-8	Lennon
1947-04-12	Dundalk B	A	Metropolitan Cup Rd 2	1-8	W Purcell
1933-09-30	Shelbourne B	A	LSL Division 1	1-8	Bennett

=== Highest aggregate scores ===
Date	Opposition	H/A	Competition	Score	Scorers
1954-09-18	Aer Lingus	A	LSL Division 1	5-7	Donnelly (2), John Duffy, Frank Obiakpani, Quinn
1947-08-30	Jacobs	A	Leinster Senior Cup Rd 2	2-10	O'Connor, M...
1927-09-10	Vickers	H	LSL Division 1	9-3	P Byrne (4), P Kennedy (2), J Dempsey, Peppard, J McCaffrey
1927-02-12	Corinthians	H	LSL Division 1	6-6	P Byrne (2), Geary (2), J Dempsey, O'Reilly
2019-08-16	Bohemians	A	LoI Premier Division	1-10	Jason McClelland
1957-02-02	Shelbourne B	A	Metropolitan Cup Rd 2	2-9	Hall, O'Brien
1952-09-06	Longford Town	H	Leinster Senior Cup Rd 2	5-6 (aet)	P Doris (2), V Gilbride, Brian Lenihan, Frank Obiakpani
1951-05-06	Longford Town	A	LSL Division 1	3-8	P Doris, McGovern, Frank Obiakpani
1951-02-10	Shelbourne B	A	Metropolitan Cup Rd 1	4-7	Doran, Cassidy, McGovern (2)
1948-09-25	Jacobs	A	LSL Division 1	3-8	Walsh (2), Golastegi
1920-11-13	Shelbourns	H	LSL Division 1	1-10	Jim O'Flaherty

=== UCD AFC Supporters' Player of the Year ===
Season	Winner
1999–00	(Republic of Ireland) Ciarán Martyn
2000–01	(Republic of Ireland) Clive Delaney
2001–02	(Republic of Ireland) Barry Ryan
2002–03	(Republic of Ireland) Barry Ryan
2003	(Republic of Ireland) Mick O'Donnell
2004	(Republic of Ireland) Seán Finn
2005	(Republic of Ireland) Darren Quigley
2006	(Republic of Ireland) Tony McDonnell
2007	(Republic of Ireland) Conan Byrne
2009	(Republic of Ireland) Evan McMillan
2010	(Republic of Ireland) Ciarán Kilduff
2011	(Republic of Ireland) Gerard Barron
2012	(Republic of Ireland) Michael Leahy
2013	(Republic of Ireland) David O'Connor
2014	(Republic of Ireland) Robbie Benson
2015	(Republic of Ireland) Ryan Swan
2016	(Cameroon) Maxi Kougoun
2017	(Republic of Ireland) Georgie Kelly

== List of UCD seasons ==
Season	League of Ireland									FAI Cup (Note: Prior to 1979, FAI Intermediate Cup. From 1979 onwards, FAI Senior Cup.)	League Cup	Leinster Senior Cup	Other domestic	Europe	Top scorer (all comps)	
Season	Division	P	W	D	L	F	A	Pts	Pos	FAI Cup	League Cup	Leinster Senior Cup	Other domestic	Europe	Top scorer (all comps)	
1922/23	(Note: UCD were elected to the League of Ireland, but resigned on 30 August 1922 as they would be unable to field a team until term started on 19 October, five weeks into the new season.)															
1923/24	LSL 1	24 (Note: Away games against Inchicore United and St James' Gate B left unplayed)	15	2	7	66	47	32	3rd	R1		R2	Metropolitan Cup – R2			
1924/25	LSL 1	23 (Note: UCD played no games after March, leaving home games against Drumcondra and Richmond, and away games against Bohemians B, Brideville, Drumcondra, Dublin United and St Paul's unplayed)	6	1	18	40	66	13	13th	R2		R1	Metropolitan Cup – R2		J Geary	11
1925/26	LSL 1	29 (Note: Result of an away match against Frankfort not reported)	8	4	17	56	86	20	12th	R1			Metropolitan Cup – R1		J Geary	17
1926/27	LSL 1	30	13	5	12	73	69	31	8th	R3		R1	Metropolitan Cup – R1		P Byrne	20
1927/28	LSL 1	30	10	2	18	60	67	22	12th	SF		R3	Metropolitan Cup – R1		Cavanagh, P Byrne	10
1928/29	LSL 1	29 (Note: Result of an away match against Bohemians B not reported)	7	5	17	52	71	19	13th	R1		QF	Metropolitan Cup – R1		Cavanagh	16
1929/30	LSL 1	30	10	4	16	51	69	24	11th	R1			Metropolitan Cup – R2		Donaghy	15
1930/31	LSL 1	27 (Note: Home game against Dolphin B and away games against St James' Gate B and Glasnevin left unplayed)	13	7	7	62 (Note: Score of a win against Trinity College not reported)	41	33	7th	R3		R1	Metropolitan Cup – R1		O'Dea	27
1931/32	LSL 1	28 (Note: Home game against Dolphin B and away game against Brideville B left unplayed)	9	2	17	66	76	20	13th	R1		R1	Metropolitan Cup – R1		O'Donnell	25
1932/33	LSL 1	29 (Note: Result of a home match against Shelbourne B not reported)	10	3	16	71	67	23	13th	R1		R1	Metropolitan Cup – R2		O'Donnell	22
1933/34	LSL 1	29 (Note: Result of an away match against Trinity College not reported)	9	5	15	56	72	23	12th	R1		R1	Metropolitan Cup – R1		O'Donnell	15
1934/35	LSL 1	30 (Note: Opening seven results not reported due to a printing strike)							6th	R1		R1	Metropolitan Cup – R2 and FAI Senior Cup – R1			
1935/36	LSL 1	29 (Note: Result of an away game against Bohemians B not reported)	9	8	12	67	59	26	10th	R1		R1	Metropolitan Cup – R1		Barry Hooper	30
1936/37	LSL 1	38	14	4	20	63	92	32	14th	R3		R2	Metropolitan Cup – R2		Barry Hooper	15
1937/38	LSL 1	30 (Note: Home game against Shelbourne B, and away games against B & I, Bohemians B, and Hospitals Trust left unplayed)	10	1	19	43	67	21	15th	R3		SF	Metropolitan Cup – R2		Barry Hooper	17
1938/39	LSL 1	26	12	3	11	47	44	27	6th	R1		R1	Metropolitan Cup – R2 and FAI Senior Cup – R1		Paddy Crean	11
1939/40	LSL 1	26	4	5	17	36	71	13	13th	R1		R1	Metropolitan Cup – R2		W Donnelly	5
1940/41	LSL 1	19 (Note: Away games against Bohemians B, Brideville B and Longford Town left unplayed)	5	4	10	33	54	14	10th	R2		R1	Metropolitan Cup – R1		Paddy Crean	7
1941/42	LSL 1	22	4	4	14	23	63	12	10th	R1		SF	Metropolitan Cup – R2			
1942/43	LSL 1	20	9	3	8	53	46	21	6th	(Note: FAI Intermediate Cup not held due to The Emergency)			Metropolitan Cup – R2			
1943/44	LSL 1	21 (Note: Away game against Bradmola left unplayed)	7	3	11	39	55	17	10th	(Note: FAI Intermediate Cup not held due to The Emergency)		R2	Metropolitan Cup – R2		B Rooney	9
1944/45	LSL 1	18 (Note: Home game against Shelbourne B and away game against 6th Brigade left unplayed)	5	2	10	37	46	12	8th	W		R1	Metropolitan Cup – SF		Purcell	10
1945/46	LSL 1	16 (Note: Home games against Drumcondra B, Grangegorman and Ierne, and away game against Dundalk B left unplayed)	1	3	12	26	49	6	11th	R2		R1	Metropolitan Cup – R1		J O'Hagen	6
1946/47	LSL 1	16 (Note: Home games against Longford Town, St Patrick's Athletic and Shelbourne B, and away games against Bohemians B, Dundalk B, Jacobs, Longford Town and St Patrick's Athletic left unplayed owing to a combination of the National Harvest Emergency in Sept 1946 and the Big Snow of 1947)	1	5	10	28	54	7	13th	R1		R1	Metropolitan Cup – R2			
1947/48	LSL 1	23 (Note: Away game against St Patrick's Athletic left unplayed.)	4	3	16	40	71	11	12th	R1		R1	Metropolitan Cup – R1			
1948/49	LSL 1	23 (Note: Home game against Bohemians B and away games against Botanic and Drumcondra B left unplayed.)	2	5	16	34	84	9	13th	R3		R1	Metropolitan Cup – R1		Coleman, Brian Lenihan, McGuirk	6
1949/50	LSL 1	25 (Note: Away game against Shelbourne B left unplayed.)	7	6	12	47	55	20	7th	R3		R1	Metropolitan Cup – R3		Brian Lenihan	9
1950/51	LSL 1	23 (Note: Home game against St James' Gate and away games against Dundalk B and Shamrock Rovers B left unplayed.)	6	1	16	35	78	13	13th	R1		R1	Metropolitan Cup – R1			
1951/52	LSL 1	25 (Note: Result of an away game against Dundalk not reported.)	12	4	9	67	57	28	4th	R1		R1	Metropolitan Cup – R1		Brian Lenihan	
1952/53	LSL 1	25 (Note: Home game against Grangegorman left unplayed.)	9	4	12	53	58	22	8th	SF		R2	Metropolitan Cup – R1 and FAI Senior Cup – R1		Paddy Doris	
1953/54	LSL 1	26 (Note: Home game against Dublin Port and Docks, and away games against Aer Lingus, Drumcondra B, and St James' Gate left unplayed.)	6	3	17	47	81	15	13th	R1		R2	Metropolitan Cup – R2			
1954/55	LSL 1	27 (Note: Away games against Botanic, Dundalk B, and Shelbourne B left unplayed.)	10	7	10	57	51	27	6th	R1		R2	Metropolitan Cup – R2		John Duffy	22
1955/56	LSL 1	32 (Note: Home games against Ormeau and St James' Gate, and away games against Aer Lingus, Botanic, Drumcondra B, and Workmen's Club left unplayed.)	14	9	9	55	50	37	8th	R1		R2	Metropolitan Cup – SF		John Duffy, Fidelis Ezemenari, Danny Moy, Jackie Williams	8
1956/57	LSL 1	28 (Note: Home games against Aer Lingus, Botanic and St James' Gate, and away games against Aer Lingus, Bohemians B, Botanic, Drumcondra B, Dundalk B, Rathfarnham and St Paul's left unplayed.)	8	3	17	45	84	19	15th	SF		R1	Metropolitan Cup – R2 and FAI Senior Cup – R1		Luke Plunkett	
1957/58	LSL 1	36 (Note: Home games against Aer Lingus and either Drumcondra or Home Farm left unplayed.)	8	12	16	53 (Note: Score of a defeat against either Drumcondra or Home Farm not reported.)	73	28	13th	R1		R2	Metropolitan Cup – R2		John Duffy	
1958/59	LSL 1	33 (Note: Both games against Home Farm, home games against Jacobs and Shelbourne B, and an away game against Shamrock Rovers B left unplayed.)	13	1	19	52	65	27	16th	R2			Metropolitan Cup – QF		Éamon Stubbings	14
1959/60	LSL 1	31 (Note: Both games against Shamrock Rovers B and an away game against St Patrick's Athletic B left unplayed.)	3	6	22	25 (Note: Score of a defeat against St Brendan's Hospital not reported)	76	12	18th	R2		R1	Metropolitan Cup – R2		Éamon Stubbings	10
1960/61	LSL 1	32 (Note: Home game against Home Farm and away game against Ormeau left unplayed.)	6	7	19	40 (Note: Scores of a win against Transport B and a defeat against Jacobs not reported due to a printing strike.)	77	19	16th	R2		R1	Metropolitan Cup – R1		Cahill	7
1961/62	LSL 1	29 (Note: Home game against St James' Gate and away games against Bohemians and Transport B (A) left unplayed.)	7	4	18	52	82	18	15th	R1		R1	Metropolitan Cup – R3		T O'Reilly	16
1962/63	LSL 1	25 (Note: Home games against CIÉ, Jacobs, and St Patrick's Athletic B, and away games against Bohemians B, Chapelizod, Home Farm and Ormeau left unplayed.)	8	3	14	58	84	19	12th	R1		R1	Metropolitan Cup – R2		T O'Reilly	15
1963/64	LSL 1S (Note: The LSL Division 1 was split into North and South sections for this season.)	21 (Note: Away game against Jacobs left unplayed.)	6	5	10	42	54	17	8th	R2		R1	Metropolitan Cup – Group		B O'Rourke	13
1964/65	LSL 1	22 (Note: Home games against Gas Company, Rialto and St James' Gate, and away games against Home Farm B, Jacobs and Workmen's Club were left unplayed. In addition, Greenfield Park withdrew without playing either game against UCD, and CIÉ withdrew without playing their away game against UCD.)	10	5	7	46	44	25	5th	R2		R1	Metropolitan Cup – R2		Gerry Molloy	12
1965/66	LSL 1	25 (Note: One game against Workmen's Club left unplayed.)	5	6	14	30 (Note: Scores of defeats against TEK United and Gas Company were not reported due to the newspaper printing strike of 1965.)	55	16	12th	R1		(Note: Results of the early-round Leinster Senior Cup games were not reported due to the newspaper printing strike of 1965. UCD were eliminated before the third round.)	Metropolitan Cup – R1		Gerry Molloy, Mick Hooper	7
1966/67	LSL 1	26	6	6	14	40	60	18	10th	R2		R1	Metropolitan Cup – R2		J Hannon	10
1967/68	LSL 1	20 (Note: UCD started their season in the fifth round of matches. At the end of the season, home games against St James' Gate and Workmen's Club, and away games against Aer Lingus and TEK United were unplayed.)	6	3	11	33 (Note: Score of a defeat against Jacobs not reported)	39	15	11th	R1			Metropolitan Cup – SF		Brian Walsh	12
1968/69	LSL 1	22 (Note: UCD started their season in the ninth round of matches. At the end of the season, home games against Aer Lingus, Glebe North, St James' Gate and Trinity, and away games against Jacobs, Rialto, Trinity and Workman's Club were unplayed.)	6	4	12	37	45	16	13th	R1			Metropolitan Cup – R1		Mick Kirby	11
1969/70	LSL 1	24 (Note: Games against TEK United, Rialto and St James' Gate were left unplayed, while Jacob's withdrew before the sides' second league meeting)	3	6	15	22	58	11	↑14th (Note: UCD were elected to the League of Ireland B Division for the following season.)	R1		R1	Metropolitan Cup – R1		Joe Cunningham	5
1970/71	LoI B	26	4	4	18	32	63	12	12th	R1			Castrol Trophy – Group and PJ Casey Cup – R1		Charlie O'Donnell	9
1971/72	LoI B	26	7	6	13	36	49	18	11th	R1		R1	Castrol Trophy – Group and PJ Casey Cup – R1		Cathal Travers	9
1972/73	LoI B	23 (Note: Games against Athlone Town B (both) and Dalkey United were left unplayed)	10	5	8	43	37	25	5th	R1		R2	Castrol Trophy – Group		Kevin Henry	8
1973/74	LoI B	22	6	8	8	32 (Note: Scores of a win against Dalkey United and defeats against Home Farm B and Dundalk B not reported)	30	20	7th	R2		R1	Castrol Trophy – Group		Aldo Martina	7
1974/75	LoI B	21 (Note: One match against Dalkey United not played)	10	5	6	34 (Note: Score of a win against Dundalk B not reported)	27	25	4th	R1		R1	Castrol Trophy – Group		J McDermott	10
1975/76	LoI B	22	10	8	4	44	24	28	3rd	R1			Egan Trophy – R1		Kevin Moran, Martin Moran, A Bradford	6
1976/77	LoI B	22	8	3	11	34 (Note: Scores of a win against Athlone Town B and a draw against St Patrick's Athletic B not reported)	48	19	9th	R1			Blackthorn Trophy – Group		Martin Moran	9
1977/78	LoI B	19 (Note: Games against Dundalk B, Shelbourne B and Dalkey United were left unplayed.)	10	3	6	47	26	23	4th	R1			Blackthorn Trophy – SF (Note: UCD beat Dundalk in the semi-final of the Blackthorn Trophy, but this result was appealed by Dalkey United on the basis that their quarter-final against Dundalk was still outstanding. Dalkey were readmitted to the competition to play Dundalk on the basis that if they won, they would play UCD in the semi-final, and if they lost, UCD would advance to the final. Dalkey beat Dundalk and eventually won the competition outright.)		Martin Moran	16
1978/79	LoI B	24	7	8	9	31 (Note: Score of a win against Belgrove not reported)	41	22	↑8th (Note: Although UCD finished behind Trinity College, CYM, and five LoI reserve teams, they were elected to the League of Ireland for the following season to replace Cork Celtic, who had gone bankrupt.)	R1					David Cassidy	6
1979/80	LoI	30	5	4	21	24	75	14	15th	R4	R1	R2			Martin Moran	11
1980/81	LoI	30	8	9	13	37	49	25	12th	R4	R1	W			Martin Moran	12
1981/82	LoI	30	7	10	13	30	41	37 (Note: Four points for an away win, three points for a home win, two points for an away draw and one point for a home draw.)	13th	R4	R1	QF			Ken O'Doherty	6
1982/83	LoI	26	4	4	18	29	63	16 (Note: Three points for a win and one point for a draw.)	13th	R4	Grp	R3			Ken O'Doherty	7
1983/84	LoI	26	9	10	7	24	23	28 (Note: Two points for a win and one point for a draw.)	6th	W	Grp	RU	Dublin City Cup – SF and League of Ireland Shield – RU		Ken O'Doherty	10
1984/85	LoI	30	12	14	4	41	26	38	4th	QF	Grp	RU	President's Cup – RU	ECWC R1	Joe Hanrahan	9
1985/86	Prem	22	2	4	16	19	50	8	↓12th	R4	Grp	SF			Brendan Murphy	8
1986/87	First	18	8	3	7	22	22	19	5th	R4	Grp	R2	First Division Shield – Group		Mark McKenna	7
1987/88	First	27	9	7	11	37	36	25	5th	R5	Grp	R1			Mark McKenna	8
1988/89	First	27	11	12	4	36	16	34	↑2nd	R2	Grp	R2			Mark McKenna and Dave Tilson	8
1989/90	Prem	33	6	5	22	25	61	17	↓12th	R2	Grp	QF			Paul Cullen	9
1990/91	First	27	11	5	11	32	25	27	6th	R1	Grp	R2	First Division Shield – Group		Paul Cullen	12
1991/92	First	27	11	8	8	37	25	30	4th	R2	Grp	R3	First Division Shield – W		Paul Cullen and Darren O'Brien	12
1992/93	First	27	10	10	7	36	26	30	4th	R2	Grp		First Division Shield – Group		Darren O'Brien	13
1993/94	First	27	10	10	7	37	23	40 (Note: Three points for a win and one point for a draw.)	4th	R1	Grp	QF	First Division Shield – Group		Darren O'Brien	17
1994/95	First	33	20	4	3	56	12	64	↑1st	R1	Grp	W	First Division Shield – W		Mick O'Byrne	27
1995/96	Prem	33	12	6	15	38	39	42	7th= (Note: UCD finished level on points, goal difference and goals scored with Dundalk.)	R1	Grp	W			Mick O'Byrne	17
1996/97	Prem	33	12	7	14	34	39	43	8th	R1	Grp	SF			Robbie Griffin	8
1997/98	Prem	33	9	12	12	30	31	39	10th (Note: UCD beat Limerick 5-2 on aggregate in a promotion/relegation play-off)	QF	Grp	QF			Jason Sherlock	15
1998/99	Prem	33	10	12	11	31	32	42	6th	R2	Grp	QF			Mick O'Byrne	8
1999/00	Prem	33	13	12	8	40	29	51	4th	R2	R2	R1			Mick O'Byrne	12
2000/01	Prem	33	9	10	14	36	44	37	10th (Note: UCD beat Athlone Town 4-2 on penalties after a 3-3 aggregate draw in a promotion/relegation play-off)	R2	RU	R1	FAI Super Cup – W	InterToto R1	Ciarán Martyn	8
2001/02	Prem	33	12	12	9	40	39	48	7th	QF	R2				Robbie Martin	12
2002/03	Prem	27	8	9	10	23	25	33	6th	R2					Robbie Doyle	9
2003	Prem	36	7	13	16	27	39	34	↓10th	R3	Grp				Robbie Griffin	6
2004	First	33	22	9	2	63	21	75	↑2nd	QF	Grp				Willie Doyle and Robbie Martin	15
2005	Prem	33	7	12	14	28	44	33	9th	QF	RU				Robbie Martin and Pat McWalter	9
2006	Prem	30	9	10	11	26	26	38	6th	QF	R1				Conor Sammon	8
2007	Prem	33	7	10	16	31	44	31	10th	SF	SF				Conor Sammon	11
2008	Prem	33	4	9	20	19	46	21	↓12th	R2	R2				Timmy Purcell	3
2009	First	33	23	5	5	62	22	74	↑1st	R3	SF				Ciarán Kilduff	16
2010	Prem	33	11	8	17	47	54	41	7th	R4	R2	SF			Ciarán Kilduff	18
2011	Prem	36	10	4	22	42	80	34	8th	R2	R1	SF	Setanta Sports Cup – R1		Graham Rusk	11
2012	Prem	30	8	7	15	32	48	31	9th	R2	R2	SF			Graham Rusk	10
2013	Prem	33	8	6	19	45	73	30	9th	R1	R1	QF			Dave McMillan	12
2014	Prem	33	6	7	20	27	71	25	↓11th (Note: UCD lost 5-2 on aggregate to Galway United in the promotion/relegation play-off)	R2	R1	QF			Robbie Benson	5
2015	First	28	14	7	7	51	26	49	3rd (Note: UCD lost 3-1 on aggregate to Finn Harps in a promotion/relegation play-off semi-final)	R2	R1	R4		Europa League QR2 (Note: UCD qualified for the Europa League through the Fair Play Award)	Ryan Swan	15
2016	First	28	14	6	8	57	40	48	4th	QF	R1	SF			Gary O'Neill	16
2017	First	28	13	8	7	42	23	47	3rd	R1	R1	SF		UEFA Youth League R1 (Note: UCD qualified for the UEFA Youth League by virtue of winning the 2016 U19 League of Ireland)	Georgie Kelly	18
2018	First	27	17	6	4	59	29	57	↑1st	SF	R1	R4			Georgie Kelly	14
2019	Prem	36	5	4	27	25	82	19	↓10th	QF	QF	QF			Yoyo Mahdy	9
2020	First	18	9	3	6	44	29	30	3rd (Note: UCD lost 3-2 after extra time to Longford Town in a promotion/relegation play-off quarter-final)	R2	(Note: League Cup cancelled due to COVID-19)	(Note: Leinster Senior Cup cancelled due to COVID-19)			Yoyo Mahdy	16
2021	First	27	13	7	7	55	38	46	↑3rd (Note: In the promotion/relegation play-off series, UCD beat Treaty United 4-2 on aggregate in the quarter-final, beat Bray Wanderers 2-0 in the semi-final and beat Waterford FC 2-1 in the final)	QF	(Note: League Cup cancelled due to COVID-19)	(Note: Leinster Senior Cup cancelled due to COVID-19)			Colm Whelan	26
2022	Premier	36	6	8	22	28	67	26	9th (Note: UCD beat Waterford FC 1-0 in the promotion/relegation play-off final)	QF					Tommy Lonergan	12
2023	Premier	36	2	5	29	19	96	11	↓10th	R2					Danú Kinsella-Bishop	6
2024	First	36	14	14	8	47	37	56	2nd (Note: UCD lost 2-1 on aggregate against Bray Wanderers in a promotion/relegation play-off quarter-final)	QF		Grp		UEFA Youth League R2 (Note: UCD qualified for the UEFA Youth League by virtue of winning the 2023 U17 League of Ireland)	Jake Doyle	10
2025	First	36	17	8	11	50	40	59	4th (Note: UCD lost 4-2 on aggregate against Bray Wanderers in a promotion/relegation play-off quarter-final)	R2		Grp			Adam Brennan	10
2026	First	36	16	8	12	67	51	56	↑2nd (Note: In the promotion/relegation playoff series, UCD beat Longford Town 4-0 on aggregate in the quarter-final, beat Bray Wanderers 3-1 in the semi-final and beat Drogheda United 2-1 in the final.)	R3		Grp			Hugh Smith	18

== Managers ==
- (Republic of Ireland) Ronnie Nolan (–1979)
- (Republic of Ireland) Dr Tony O'Neill (1979–83)
- (Republic of Ireland) Dermot Keely (1983 Player manager July–November)
- (Republic of Ireland) Theo Dunne (1983–90)
- (Republic of Ireland) Dr Tony O'Neill (1990–94) General Manager 1979–1999
- (Republic of Ireland) Theo Dunne (1994–99)
- (Republic of Ireland) Martin Moran (1999–2001)
- (Republic of Ireland) Paul Doolin (2001–03)
- (Republic of Ireland) Pete Mahon (Sept 15, 2003 – Jan 12, 2009)
- (Republic of Ireland) Martin Russell (13 Jan 2009 – Oct 2013)
- (Republic of Ireland) Aaron Callaghan (November 2013-October 2014)
- (Republic of Ireland) Collie O'Neill (2015–August 2019)
- (Poland) Maciej Tarnogrodzki (August 2019–December 2019)
- (Republic of Ireland) Andy Myler (2020–2023)
- (Republic of Ireland) William O'Connor (2024–)
