= Tony O'Neill (physician) =

Irish sports administrator (1946–1999)

Personal details
- Born: Thomas Anthony Paul O'Neill; 19 June 1946 Dublin, Ireland
- Died: 3 October 1999 (aged 53) Dublin, Ireland

Thomas Anthony "Tony" Paul O'Neill (19 June 1946 – 3 October 1999) was an Irish footballer, physician and sports administrator. He was known for his decades-long affiliation with University College Dublin (UCD) where, after graduating as a student, he worked across various administrative positions within its sports department, most notably within its football team.

== Early life ==
Thomas Anthony Paul O'Neill was born in Dublin on 19 June 1946 to local engineer James Edward (Séamus) O'Neill and his wife Johanna Teresa Mary (née Brennan). He was the elder of their two sons and they also had one daughter.

He was educated at Milltown Boys' National School, and then at De La Salle College in Churchtown before eventually enrolling in University College Dublin.

In his youth, he played association football as a goalkeeper.

== University College Dublin ==
After leaving De La Salle College, O'Neill first came to University College Dublin as a student doing a course in medicine. He graduated in 1971.

During his time as a UCD student, he was appointed as the secretary of UCD A.F.C. in 1966, the first of his many roles within the club.

Early in his career O'Neill practised sports medicine in Dublin, and at that time he was already involved in developing soccer at UCD. He brought the club into senior competition, and UCD won the FAI Cup for the first time in 1984 after a replayed final. The university's sports scholarship programme was started by the soccer club under his direction.

O'Neill was general secretary of the Football Association of Ireland before he became the first director of sport at UCD in 1991. He remained as general manager of UCD AFC until his death following a short illness on 3 October 1999, at the age of 53.
