= Belfield Park =

Sports venue in Dún Laoghaire–Rathdown, Ireland

Coordinates: 53°18′12.11″N 6°12′51.68″W

Belfield Park was a sports venue in Dún Laoghaire–Rathdown, Ireland which was the home ground of University College Dublin A.F.C. from 1930 until 2007. It was previously a walled garden of Belfield House.

The ground was officially opened in August 1971 as Shamrock Rovers defeated a Mick Meagan XI.

It had capacity for 2,500 people, including 1,448 seats. It was located on the western edge of the Belfield campus off Foster's Avenue. The main stand was the covered AIB Stand, while the Foster's Avenue End, which had been closed for two seasons because the wooden floorboards were unsafe in wet weather, was re-opened for the 2007 League of Ireland season with the bucket seats from the old Lansdowne Road stadium.

The stadium played host to under-age Ireland international matches and senior international training sessions on occasion as well as hosting some games in the 1994 UEFA European Under-16 Football Championship. Shamrock Rovers and Dublin City F.C. also played League of Ireland Cup games against UCD at Belfield Park.

300 extra seats were temporarily added for the 2005 League Cup final against Derry City, which, together with the opening of the hill, increased capacity to 2,500.

UCD left Belfield Park after the 2007 season as plans for a ground share with the rugby team in the UCD Bowl came to fruition. The move was expected to take place as early as October 2007 but did not happen until the start of the 2008 League of Ireland. Belfield Park was later developed by the college as the University Biotechnology Centre.
