= 2004 Shelbourne F.C. season =

Shelbourne
2004 season
- Chairman: Ollie Byrne
- Manager: Pat Fenlon
- Premier Division: 1st
- UEFA Champions League: Third qualifying round
- UEFA Cup: First round
- FAI Cup: Third round
- League Cup: First round
- Top goalscorer: League: Jason Byrne (25); All: Jason Byrne (28)
Home colours	Away colours	Third colours

In the 2004 season, Shelbourne were crowned League of Ireland Premier Division champions.

== Personnel ==
=== Managerial and backroom staff ===
Manager: Pat Fenlon
Assistant managers: Johnny McDonnell (to May 2004), Eamon Collins (from May 2004)

=== 2004 squad members ===
Note: Flags indicate national team as defined under FIFA eligibility rules; some limited exceptions apply. Players may hold more than one non-FIFA nationality.

No.	Pos.	Nation	Player
—	GK	(Wales) WAL	Steve Williams
—	GK	(Republic of Ireland) IRL	Dean Delany
—	GK	(Scotland) SCO	Kris Robertson
—	DF	(Republic of Ireland) IRL	Owen Heary (Captain)
—	DF	(Republic of Ireland) IRL	Derek Pender
—	DF	(Republic of Ireland) IRL	Kevin Doherty
—	DF	(Wales) WAL	Jamie Harris
—	DF	(Republic of Ireland) IRL	Alan McDermott
—	DF	(England) ENG	Dave Rogers
—	DF	(Republic of Ireland) IRL	Tony McCarthy
—	DF	(Republic of Ireland) IRL	David Crawley
—	MF	(Republic of Ireland) IRL	Stuart Byrne
—	MF	(Republic of Ireland) IRL	Alan Cawley

No.	Pos.	Nation	Player
—	MF	(Republic of Ireland) IRL	Jim Crawford
—	MF	(Cameroon) CMR	Joseph Ndo
—	MF	(Republic of Ireland) IRL	Alan Moore
—	MF	(Republic of Ireland) IRL	Thomas Morgan
—	MF	(Republic of Ireland) IRL	Robbie Shields
—	MF	(Republic of Ireland) IRL	Wes Hoolahan
—	MF	(Republic of Ireland) IRL	Ollie Cahill
—	FW	(Republic of Ireland) IRL	Jason Byrne
—	FW	(Republic of Ireland) IRL	Glen Fitzpatrick
—	FW	(Republic of Ireland) IRL	Ger McCarthy
—	FW	(Republic of Ireland) IRL	Ger Rowe
—	FW	(Argentina) ARG	Juan Sara

== Results of league tables ==
=== League of Ireland Premier Division ===
19 March 2004	Shelbourne	1 – 0	Shamrock Rovers	Tolka Park, Dublin
19.45 GMT	Jason Byrne 20'	Report		Referee: Eddie Barr (Dublin)

27 March 2004	Derry City	0 – 2	Shelbourne	Brandywell Stadium, Derry
19.30 GMT		Report	Jason Byrne 81'; Stuart Byrne 86'	Referee: John Feighery (Dublin)

2 April 2004	Shelbourne	3 – 0	Drogheda United	Tolka Park, Dublin
19.45 IST	Ger Rowe 55'; Jason Byrne 65'; Glen Fitzpatrick 81'	Report		Referee: Alan Kelly (Cork)

5 April 2004	Bohemians	1 – 1	Shelbourne	Dalymount Park, Dublin
19.45 IST	Damian Lynch 84'	Report	Jason Byrne 31' (pen.)	Attendance: 5,014; Referee: Damien Hancock (Dublin)

9 April 2004	Shelbourne	2 – 1	Dublin City	Tolka Park, Dublin
19.45 IST	Ollie Cahill 47'; Jason Byrne 78' (pen.)	Report	Gary O'Neill 86'	Referee: Hugo Whoriskey (Meath)

12 April 2004	Cork City	0 – 2	Shelbourne	Turners Cross, Cork
19.45 IST		Report	Dan Murray 53' (o.g.); Ollie Cahill 75'	Referee: John Feighery (Dublin)

16 April 2004	Shelbourne	1 – 1	Longford Town	Tolka Park, Dublin
19.45 IST	Jason Byrne 9'	Report	Barry Ferguson 70' (pen.)	Referee: Eddie Barr (Dublin)

23 April 2004	Waterford United	1 – 1	Shelbourne	R.S.C., Waterford
19.30 IST	Daryl Murphy 51'	Report	Glen Fitzpatrick 28'	Referee: Paul McKeon (Dublin)

30 April 2004	Shelbourne	2 – 0	St. Patrick's Athletic	Tolka Park, Dublin
19.45 IST	Jason Byrne 12' 52'	Report		Referee: Alan Kelly (Cork)

7 May 2004	Shamrock Rovers	3 – 0	Shelbourne	Richmond Park, Dublin
19.00 IST	Stephen Gough 25'; Keith O'Halloran 36'; Stephen Grant 90'	Report	Dave Rogers (red card) 55'	Referee: Anthony Buttimer (Cork)

14 May 2004	Shelbourne	1 – 0	Derry City	Tolka Park, Dublin
19.45 IST	Glen Fitzpatrick 59'	Report		Referee: Alan Kelly (Cork)

28 May 2004	Shelbourne	0 – 0	Bohemians	Tolka Park, Dublin
19.45 IST		Report		Referee: Ian Stokes (Dublin)

4 June 2004	Dublin City	1 – 3	Shelbourne	Tolka Park, Dublin
19.45 IST	Paul Crowley 84'	Report	Jason Byrne 36' 46' 66'	Referee: Hugo Whoriskey (Meath)

8 June 2004	Shelbourne	2 – 2	Cork City	Tolka Park, Dublin
19.45 IST	Jason Byrne 38' (pen.); Thomas Morgan 88'	Report	John O'Flynn 19'; Neale Fenn 77'	Referee: Eddie Barr (Dublin)

11 June 2004	Longford Town	0 – 2	Shelbourne	Flancare Park, Longford
20.00 IST		Report	Ger Rowe 15'; Glen Fitzpatrick 90'	Referee: John Feighery (Dublin)

14 June 2004	Drogheda United	2 – 2	Shelbourne	United Park, Drogheda
19.45 IST	Gavin Whelan 19'; Andy Myler 49'	Report	Glen Fitzpatrick 66'; Jamie Harris 84'

18 June 2004	Shelbourne	1 – 0	Waterford United	Tolka Park, Dublin
19.45 IST	Jason Byrne 66'	Report		Referee: Alan Kelly (Cork)

25 June 2004	St. Patrick's Athletic	1 – 2	Shelbourne	Richmond Park, Dublin
19.45 IST	Aidan O'Keeffe 26'	Report	Glen Fitzpatrick 20' 56'	Referee: John Feighery (Dublin)

2 July 2004	Shelbourne	1 – 1	Shamrock Rovers	Tolka Park, Dublin
19.45 IST	Owen Heary 90+2'; Wes Hoolahan (red card) 74'	Report	Trevor Molloy 26'	Referee: Alan Kelly (Cork)

8 July 2004	Derry City	0 – 0	Shelbourne	Brandywell Stadium, Derry
19.45 IST		Report		Referee: P. Hannon

18 July 2004	Shelbourne	0 – 2	Drogheda United	Tolka Park, Dublin
19.00 IST	Jason Byrne (red card) 45'	Report	John Lester 30' (pen.); Gary Cronin 63'	Referee: Anthony Buttimer (Cork)

14 August 2004	Cork City	0 – 1	Shelbourne	Turners Cross, Cork
17.00 IST		Report	Stuart Byrne 59'	Referee: Paul McKeon (Dublin)

1 September 2004	Waterford United	3 – 1	Shelbourne	R.S.C., Waterford
19.30 IST	Willie Bruton 40' 70'; Dave Mulcahy 79'	Report	Jason Byrne 17'

6 September 2004	Shelbourne	4 – 1	Dublin City	Tolka Park, Dublin
19.45 IST	Owen Heary 37'; Jason Byrne 47' 49' 75'	Report	Adam Rundle 9'

20 September 2004	Shelbourne	3 – 1	St. Patrick's Athletic	Tolka Park, Dublin
19.45 IST	Jim Crawford 15'; Jason Byrne 65'; Ger McCarthy 90'	Report	Mark Quinless 75'; Keith Fahey (red card) 66'; Des Byrne (red card) 90+1'

24 September 2004	Shamrock Rovers	1 – 4	Shelbourne	Richmond Park, Dublin
19.00 IST	Mark O'Brien 4'	Report	Jason Byrne 2' (pen.) 49' 60'; Thomas Morgan 90'	Referee: Paul McKeon (Dublin)

4 October 2004	Shelbourne	0 – 2	Derry City	Tolka Park, Dublin
19.45 IST		Report	Peter Hutton 57'; Michael Holt 76'	Referee: Ian Stokes (Dublin)

8 October 2004	Drogheda United	2 – 5	Shelbourne	United Park, Drogheda
19.45 IST	Andy Myler 50'; Mark Rooney 90'	Report	Alan Moore 3'; Stuart Byrne 63'; Wes Hoolahan 67'; Jason Byrne 69'; Glen Fitzpatrick 87'	Referee: Paul McKeon (Dublin)

11 October 2004	Bohemians	2 – 0	Shelbourne	Dalymount Park, Dublin
19.45 IST	Stephen Ward 24'; Glen Crowe 50'	Report		Attendance: 3,247; Referee: Pat Whelan (Dublin)

15 October 2004	Shelbourne	1 – 1	Bohemians	Tolka Park, Dublin
19.35 IST	Jason Byrne 72'; Stuart Byrne (red card) 39'	Report	Tony Grant 45+1'	Referee: Alan Kelly (Cork)

21 October 2004	Dublin City	2 – 3	Shelbourne	Tolka Park, Dublin
19.45 IST	Marc Kenny 27' (pen.); Robbie Farrell 90+1'	Report	Jamie Harris 15'; Jason Byrne 83'; Ger Rowe 90+2'	Referee: Declan Hanney (Dublin)

29 October 2004	Shelbourne	0 – 0	Cork City	Tolka Park, Dublin
19.45 IST		Report		Referee: Paul McKeon (Dublin)

1 November 2004	Shelbourne	3 – 1	Longford Town	Tolka Park, Dublin
19.45 GMT	Alan Moore 10' 79'; David Crawley 37'	Report	Dessie Baker 21'	Referee: Dave McKeon (Meath)

6 November 2004	Longford Town	4 – 1	Shelbourne	Flancare Park, Longford
19.30 GMT	Eric Lavine 30'; Dessie Baker 38'; Sean Prunty 57'; Alan Kirby 90'	Report	David Crawley 35'; Alan Moore (red card) 60'; Jason Byrne (penalty missed)	Referee: Declan Hanney (Dublin)

12 November 2004	Shelbourne	2 – 1	Waterford United	Tolka Park, Dublin
19.45 GMT	Wes Hoolahan 6'; Jason Byrne 22'	Report	Willie Bruton 44'	Referee: Alan Kelly (Cork)

19 November 2004	St. Patrick's Athletic	0 – 0	Shelbourne	Richmond Park, Dublin
19.30 GMT		Report		Referee: Paul McKeon (Dublin)

==== Final league table ====
Pos	Team	Pld	W	D	L	GF	GA	GD	Pts	Qualification or relegation
1	Shelbourne (C)	36	19	11	6	57	37	+20	68	Qualification to Champions League first qualifying round
2	Cork City	36	18	11	7	52	32	+20	65	Qualification to UEFA Cup first qualifying round
3	Bohemians	36	15	15	6	51	30	+21	60	Qualification to Intertoto Cup first round
4	Drogheda United	36	15	7	14	45	43	+2	52	
5	Waterford United	36	14	8	14	44	49	−5	50	

(C) Champions

==== League results summary ====
Overall								Home						Away					
Pld	W	D	L	GF	GA	GD	Pts	W	D	L	GF	GA	GD	W	D	L	GF	GA	GD
36	19	11	6	57	37	+20	68	10	6	2	27	14	+13	9	5	4	30	23	+7

Last updated: 19 November 2004.
Source: League of Ireland Premier Division fixtures

==== League form and results by round ====
Round	1	2	3	4	5	6	7	8	9	10	11	12	13	14	15	16	17	18	19	20	21	22	23	24	25	26	27	28	29	30	31	32	33	34	35	36
Ground	H	A	H	A	H	A	H	A	H	A	H	H	A	H	A	A	H	A	H	A	H	A	A	H	H	A	H	A	A	H	A	H	H	A	H	A
Result	W	W	W	D	W	W	D	D	W	L	W	D	W	D	W	D	W	W	D	D	L	W	L	W	W	W	L	W	L	D	W	D	W	L	W	D

Updated to match(es) played on 19 November 2004. Source: League of Ireland Premier Division Fixtures
A = Away; H = Home; W = Win; D = Draw; L = Loss

=== UEFA Champions League ===
First qualifying round

14 July 2004	KR Reykjavík	2 – 2	Shelbourne	Laugardals Stadium, Reykjavík
21.00 IST	Arnar Jón Sigurgeirsson 47'; Sigurvin Ólafsson 54'	Report	Alan Moore 83'; Kristján Örn Sigurðsson 86' (o.g.)	Referee: Peter Vervecken (Belgium)

21 July 2004	Shelbourne	0 – 0	KR Reykjavík	Tolka Park, Dublin
19.45 IST		Report		Referee: Michael Svendsen (Denmark)

Aggregate 2 - 2, Shelbourne won on away goals rule

Second qualifying round

28 July 2004	Hajduk Split	3 – 2	Shelbourne	Stadion Poljud, Split
19.30 IST	Dragan Blatnjak 18' 85'; Petar Šuto 48'	Report	Glen Fitzpatrick 5'; Alan Moore 89'	Referee: Viktor Kassai (Hungary)

4 August 2004	Shelbourne	2 – 0	Hajduk Split	Tolka Park, Dublin
19.00 IST	Dave Rogers 78'; Alan Moore 90'	Report		Referee: Stanislav Sukhina (Russia)

Shelbourne won 4 - 3 on aggregate

Third qualifying round

11 August 2004	Shelbourne	0 – 0	Deportivo La Coruña	Lansdowne Road, Dublin
19.45 IST		Report		Attendance: 24,000; Referee: Michal Benes (Czech Republic)

24 August 2004	Deportivo La Coruña	3 – 0	Shelbourne	Estadio Riazor, La Coruña
20.00 IST	Víctor Sánchez 59' 66'; Walter Pandiani 89'	Report	Alan Moore (red card) 90'	Referee: Alain Hamer (Luxembourg)

Deportivo La Coruña won 3 - 0 on aggregate

=== UEFA Cup ===
First round

16 September 2004	Shelbourne	2 – 2	Lille OSC	Lansdowne Road, Dublin
19.00 IST	Glen Fitzpatrick 80' 83'	Report	Mathieu Bodmer 20'; Christophe Landrin 45+1'	Attendance: 7,463; Referee: Costas Kapitanis (Cyprus)

30 September 2004	Lille OSC	2 – 0	Shelbourne	Stadium Nord Lille Métropole, Lille
18.30 IST	Milenko Ačimovič 18'; Matt Moussilou 27'	Report		Referee: Emil Bozinovski (Macedonia)

Lille won 4 - 2 on aggregate

=== FAI Cup ===
Second round

24 July 2004	Shelbourne	4 – 1	Finn Harps	Tolka Park, Dublin
19.45 IST	Ollie Cahill 21'; Jason Byrne 28' (pen.) 84'; Wes Hoolahan 42'	Report	Gary Crossan 70'	Referee: Paul McKeon (Dublin)

Third round

19 August 2004	Shelbourne	1 – 1	Derry City	Tolka Park, Dublin
19.45 IST	Davy Byrne 22' (o.g.)	Report	Davy Byrne 26'	Referee: John Feighery (Dublin)

Replay

28 August 2004	Derry City	0 – 0 (a.e.t.) (5 – 3 p)	Shelbourne	Brandywell Stadium, Derry
19.30 IST		Report		Referee: John Feighery (Dublin)
	Penalties
	Alan Murphy (penalty scored); Peter Hutton (penalty scored); Sean Hargan (penalty scored); Gareth McGlynn (penalty scored); Ciarán Martyn (penalty scored)		(penalty scored) Dave Rogers; (penalty scored) David Crawley; (penalty scored) Jason Byrne; (penalty missed) Alan Cawley

=== League of Ireland Cup ===
First round Group 7

11 May 2004	Shelbourne	3 – 2	St. Patrick's Athletic	Tolka Park, Dublin
19.45 IST	David Crawley 10' (pen.); Ger McCarthy 35'; Ger Rowe 57'	Report	Con Blatsis 70'; Jimmi Lee Jones 89'

17 May 2004	Dublin City	2 – 1	Shelbourne	Tolka Park, Dublin
19.45 IST	Philip Hughes 79'; Robbie Collins 90'	Report	Jason Byrne 59'

Group 7 table

Pos	Team	Pld	W	D	L	GF	GA	GD	Pts	Qualification
1	Dublin City	2	2	0	0	5	2	+3	6	Advanced to quarter-finals
2	Shelbourne	2	1	0	1	4	4	0	3	
3	St Patrick's Athletic	2	0	0	2	3	6	−3	0	

== 2004 season statistics ==
=== Top Goalscorers ===
Position	Goalscorer	Total goals	League goals	Cup goals
1	(Republic of Ireland) Jason Byrne	28	25	3
2	(Republic of Ireland) Glen Fitzpatrick	11	8	3
3	(Republic of Ireland) Alan Moore	6	3	3
4	(Republic of Ireland) Ger Rowe	4	3	1
5	(Republic of Ireland) Stuart Byrne	3	3	0
	(Republic of Ireland) Ollie Cahill	3	2	1
	(Republic of Ireland) David Crawley	3	2	1
	(Republic of Ireland) Wes Hoolahan	3	2	1
9	(Wales) Jamie Harris	2	2	0
	(Republic of Ireland) Owen Heary	2	2	0
	(Republic of Ireland) Ger McCarthy	2	1	1
	(Republic of Ireland) Thomas Morgan	2	2	0
13	(Republic of Ireland) Jim Crawford	1	1	0
	(England) Dave Rogers	1	0	1
