= John Martin (Irish footballer) =

Irish footballer and coach

Personal information
- Full name: John Martin
- Date of birth: 24 December 1979 (age 46)
- Place of birth: Leixlip, Ireland
- Position: Midfielder

Youth career
- Leixlip United
- 1995–1997: Crumlin United

Senior career*
Years	Team	Apps	(Gls)
1997–2004	UCD	143	(10)
2004–2007	Longford Town	83	(6)
2007–2008	Shamrock Rovers	21	(0)

Managerial career
- Maynooth Town
- Leixlip United
- 2015–2016: Shelbourne (assistant)
- 2019–2021: Longford Town (assistant)
- 2021: Longford Town (interim)
- * Club domestic league appearances and goals

John Martin (born 24 December 1979) is an Irish football coach and former player. During his playing career, he played in the League of Ireland for UCD, Longford Town and Shamrock Rovers. He has managed Maynooth Town and Leixlip United in the Leinster Senior League and been assistant manager of Shelbourne and Longford Town, where he also spent a short period of time as interim manager.

== Career ==
=== UCD ===
He signed for UCD from Crumlin United in June 1997. He scored on his debut for UCD against Bohemians in August 1997, scoring with a header as college came from 2 goals down in a League Cup tie at Belfield. He scored his 2nd goal in an FAI Cup tie against Home Farm Everton in January 1998 in a 1–1 draw. After a successful debut season he did not feature in the 1998–99 season due to a loss of form and injury. 1999–2000 season saw Martin return to the team as College finished in 4th place in the league to secure a spot in the Inter-Toto Cup. College lost to Bulgarian side FC Velbazhd on away goals after a 3–3 draw in Belfield and a 0–0 away from home. Upon returning from the Inter-Toto cup he helped college secure the FAI Super Cup after a penalty shoot out victory against Bohemians. He scored the opening goal of the 2001 season for College away to Dundalk. He captained UCD in the 2003 season in the absence of regular club captain Tony McDonnell. He departed UCD at the end of the 2003 season after the club's relegation to the first division despite the team losing only 2 of their final 11 games.

=== Longford Town ===
He signed for Longford Town for the 2004 season. He scored on his 2nd appearance for Longford Town against Shamrock Rovers, scoring with a 25-yard volley moments after coming on to equalise for 10-man Town in a 1–1 draw. The following month he scored 2 goals for Longford in a 4–0 win against local rivals Athlone Town in a league cup tie in St Mels Park. After suffering from a severe bout of tonsillitis he spent numerous weeks out of the team but did return for a league cup semi final win against Finn Harps that Longford won 2–1 thanks to goals from Sean Francis and Dessie Baker. He won his first trophy for Longford after a 2–1 league cup final win against Bohemians in Flancare Park. He scored the first goal in the 2–1 FAI Cup semi final victory against Drogheda United in October 2004 with the winner coming from Seán Dillon in the last minute of extra time. He won his 2nd trophy for Longford in 2004 after another 2–1 victory against Waterford United in the FAI Cup final at Lansdowne Road. He scored twice to relegate Dublin City from the Premier League in the final weeks of the 2004 season. He only missed 3 games in the 2005 season, all through suspension, as Longford failed to hit the heights of 2004 but he did manage to hit winning goals against Waterford and former club UCD as Longford finished the season strongly. A fractured ankle suffered away to Waterford United disrupted most of the 2006 season although he did return from injury to score another goal against Waterford United in the FAI Cup. The loss of several of the FAI cup winning squad saw Town struggle in the 2007 as did a 6-point deduction for licensing issues and Martin left the club in the summer transfer window to sign for Shamrock Rovers in exchange for Jamie Duffy and Ian Ryan. He was previously sent off against Shamrock Rovers when Longford played them earlier in the 2007 season.

=== Shamrock Rovers ===
He signed for Shamrock Rovers in July 2007 and made his debut in a 2–0 victory against Waterford United. Persistent hip and groin injuries saw his performances curtailed for the remainder of the 2007 although he did play a starring role in a 2–0 win against local rivals Bohemians which saw Rovers climb to 2nd in the table. Rovers challenge eventually faded away after a successful return to the Premier League of Ireland under Pat Scully. Numerous injury concerns in 2008 resulted in serious hip surgery in May 2008. Despite being ruled out for the remainder of the season he managed to return for the final 8 games of the season. He claimed his first goal for Rovers against St Patrick's Athletic courtesy of a big deflection from Damian Lynch. A recurrence of the injury in training in November 2008 resulted in additional hip surgery in January 2009 and his retirement on medical grounds.

== Post-playing career ==
Following his playing career, John moved into management in the Leinster Senior League initially. A spell with Maynooth Town was followed by a successful time with Leixlip United. Successive league titles saw him lead the senior team to the top tier of the LSL for the first time in the club's history. The club also made the semi-finals of the FAI Intermediate Cup and qualified for the FAI Cup.

In January 2015, John was appointed assistant manager to Kevin Doherty at Shelbourne. With the side out of promotion contention from the League of Ireland First Division mid-way through their second season, Doherty and Martin departed Shels in June 2016.

He returned to Longford Town in August 2019 having been installed as assistant manager to Daire Doyle. In their first full season in charge, Doyle and Martin led the midlanders to promotion to the League of Ireland Premier Division via the play-offs in November 2020. A disappointing 2021 season saw Longford relegated with six games remaining. Following the departure of Doyle from the club, Martin took the role of interim manager on 2 November 2021 for the final three games of the season before he also left the Town.

In April 2023, he was announced as Chief Executive of Shamrock Rovers. In April 2025, it was announced that Martin would be stepping down from the role during that summer.

On 11 September 2025, Martin was announced as Director of Football at the Football Association of Ireland.

== Personal life ==
From a footballing family, John played with his brother Robbie for UCD between 2000 and 2003 and at Longford Town from 2006 to 2007. Their father Paul played for Shamrock Rovers in the early 1970s and was part of the famous Athlone Town team that drew with AC Milan in St Mel's Park 1975.

== Honours ==
UCD

- FAI Super Cup (1): 2000

Longford Town

- FAI Cup (1): 2004
- League of Ireland Cup (1): 2004
