= 2004 League of Ireland Premier Division =

League of Ireland Premier Division
- Season: 2004
- Champions: Shelbourne (12th title)
- Relegated: Dublin City
- UEFA Champions League: Shelbourne
- UEFA Cup: Cork City; Longford Town
- UEFA Intertoto Cup: Bohemians
- Setanta Sports Cup: Shelbourne; Cork City; Longford Town
- Top goalscorer: Jason Byrne: 25 (Shelbourne)

The 2004 League of Ireland Premier Division was the 20th season of the League of Ireland Premier Division. The division was made up of 10 teams. Shelbourne were champions while Cork City finished as runners-up. Both clubs also enjoyed respectable runs in Europe.

== Overview ==
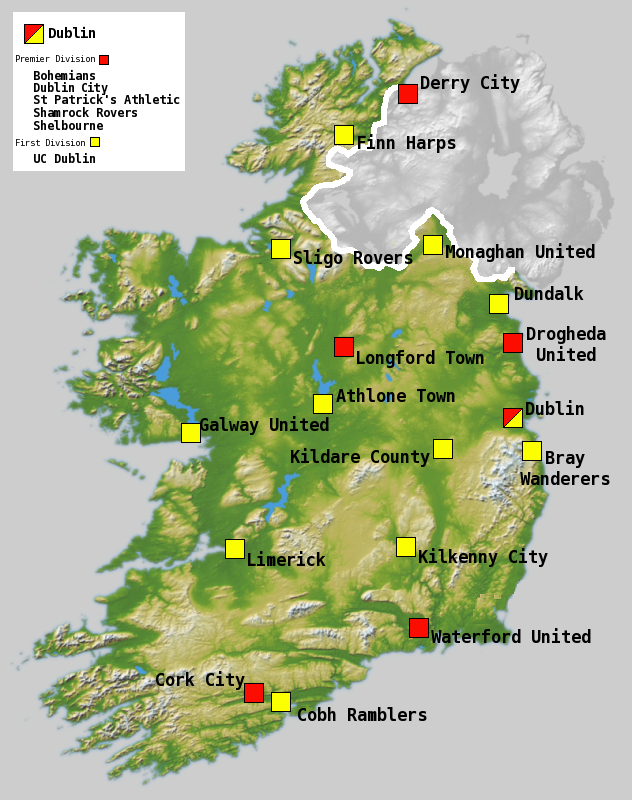
The locations of the clubs that competed in the 2004 League of Ireland season

The season began on 19 March and ended on 22 November. Each team played four rounds of games, totalling 36 games each. The 2005 season would see the League of Ireland Premier Division revert to 12 twelve teams. To facilitate this expansion there was no promotion/relegation play-off this season and only one team, Dublin City, were automatically relegated. At the end of October, Drogheda United and Bohemians were all but out of the title race. Drogheda United and Bohemians were twelve points and eight points behind leaders Shelbourne respectively. Shelbourne had not quite sealed the title yet, though, as Cork City had reached second place and were just four points behind with four games remaining. On 5 November it looked like the Cork City's league challenge might have been over after they could only draw at home to Derry City. If Shelbourne had beaten Longford Town the following day they would be nine points clear with Cork City having just three games remaining. Longford won 4–1. Both Cork City and Shelbourne won their remaining games before the final round of matches. This meant that Cork City were three points behind Shelbourne. Cork had to win and Shelbourne lose for the title to go the Cork instead of Shelbourne. It turned out that neither result went the way Cork wanted as both they and Shelbourne drew. This meant that Shelbourne retained the league title and Cork City would have to be satisfied with second place.

== Final table ==
Pos	Team	Pld	W	D	L	GF	GA	GD	Pts	Qualification or relegation
1	Shelbourne (C)	36	19	11	6	57	37	+20	68	Qualification to Champions League first qualifying round
2	Cork City	36	18	11	7	52	32	+20	65	Qualification to UEFA Cup first qualifying round
3	Bohemians	36	15	15	6	51	30	+21	60	Qualification to Intertoto Cup first round
4	Drogheda United	36	15	7	14	45	43	+2	52	
5	Waterford United	36	14	8	14	44	49	−5	50	
6	Longford Town	36	11	13	12	32	34	−2	46	Qualification to UEFA Cup first qualifying round (Note: Longford Town qualified for the UEFA Cup first qualifying round after winning the 2004 FAI Cup Final.)
7	Derry City	36	11	11	14	23	32	−9	44	
8	St Patrick's Athletic	36	11	9	16	38	49	−11	42	
9	Shamrock Rovers	36	10	8	18	41	47	−6	38	
10	Dublin City (R)	36	6	7	23	39	69	−30	25	Relegation to League of Ireland First Division

(C) Champions; (R) Relegated

== Results ==
=== Matches 1–18 ===
Home \ Away	BOH	COR	DER	DRO	DUB	LON	SHM	SHE	StP	WAT
Bohemians	—	2–3	3–0	0–1	2–4	0–0	2–2	1–1	3–1	2–2
Cork City	0–1	—	2–1	0–0	3–1	1–0	1–1	0–2	2–1	2–3
Derry City	0–0	1–1	—	0–2	2–1	0–0	1–0	0–2	0–0	0–1
Drogheda United	0–3	2–0	2–0	—	2–0	0–1	1–0	2–2	0–1	0–0
Dublin City	2–1	0–1	0–2	1–1	—	0–1	0–4	1–3	1–1	3–1
Longford Town	0–2	1–1	1–0	0–0	0–0	—	1–0	0–2	1–3	0–2
Shamrock Rovers	2–1	2–1	1–0	1–2	0–0	1–1	—	3–0	1–2	4–0
Shelbourne	0–0	2–2	1–0	3–0	2–1	1–1	1–0	—	2–0	1–0
St Patrick's Athletic	0–2	0–2	1–1	0–2	3–1	1–1	1–2	1–2	—	0–1
Waterford United	0–1	1–1	0–2	2–1	2–1	1–1	3–1	1–1	0–1	—

Legend: Blue = home team win; Yellow = draw; Red = away team win.

=== Matches 19–36 ===
Home \ Away	BOH	COR	DER	DRO	DUB	LON	SHM	SHE	StP	WAT
Bohemians	—	1–0	0–1	0–0	4–0	1–1	3–2	2–0	2–2	2–2
Cork City	1–1	—	1–1	3–2	1–0	2–0	1–0	0–1	3–0	2–0
Derry City	0–0	0–1	—	1–0	2–3	0–0	1–0	0–0	1–1	1–0
Drogheda United	0–3	1–3	4–0	—	2–1	0–1	3–0	2–5	0–2	1–2
Dublin City	0–0	0–1	0–2	2–3	—	2–1	1–2	2–3	1–2	1–3
Longford Town	0–1	1–2	3–0	3–1	2–0	—	1–1	4–1	2–1	1–1
Shamrock Rovers	0–1	1–1	0–0	1–2	1–3	2–0	—	1–4	3–1	1–2
Shelbourne	1–1	0–0	0–2	0–2	4–1	3–1	1–1	—	3–1	2–1
St Patrick's Athletic	1–2	0–3	0–1	1–1	2–2	1–0	2–0	0–0	—	2–1
Waterford United	1–1	1–4	1–0	1–3	3–2	0–1	2–0	3–1	0–2	—

Legend: Blue = home team win; Yellow = draw; Red = away team win.

== UEFA coefficient ==
The League of Ireland Premier Division performances in Europe this season meant that the league received a coefficient of 1.333 added to their overall coefficient which now accumulated to 4.164. This gave them a ranking 38th place as shown.

- 36. Iceland
- 37. (North Macedonia) FYR Macedonia
- 38. Republic of Ireland
- 39. Belarus
- 40. Liechtenstein

== Top-scorers ==
Player	Club	Goals
(Republic of Ireland) Jason Byrne	Shelbourne	25
(Republic of Ireland) Glen Crowe	Bohemians	19
(Republic of Ireland) Declan O'Brien	Drogheda United	14
(Republic of Ireland) Daryl Murphy	Waterford United	14
(Republic of Ireland) Kevin Doyle	Cork City	13

== Awards ==
- PFAI eircom League Player of the Year
  - Jason Byrne - Shelbourne
- PFAI eircom League Young Player of the Year
  - Daryl Murphy - Waterford United

== See also ==
- 2004 Shelbourne F.C. season
- 2004 League of Ireland First Division
- 2004 League of Ireland Cup
