= Alan Kirby =

Irish footballer (born 1977)

Personal information
- Date of birth: 8 September 1977 (age 49)
- Place of birth: Waterford, Ireland
- Height: 5 ft 8 in (1.73 m)
- Position: Winger

Youth career
- –1994: Johnville F.C.
- 1994–1996: Aston Villa

Senior career*
Years	Team	Apps	(Gls)
1996–1998	Aston Villa	0	(0)
1999–2001	Waterford United	81	(16)
2001–2006	Longford Town	183	(17)
2007–2008	St Patrick's Athletic	56	(6)
2009–2010	Sporting Fingal	60	(12)
2011	Sligo Rovers	31	(6)
2012	Longford Town	28	(5)
Total		439	(62)

International career
1998	Republic of Ireland U21	1	(0)
2010	League of Ireland XI	1	(0)
- * Club domestic league appearances and goals

Alan Kirby (born 8 September 1977) is an Irish former footballer. He played as a midfielder, most often on the right wing.

As a 16-year-old, Kirby went to England to join Premier League club Aston Villa. He spent four years with the club without making a first-team appearance, and returned to his native Waterford. He signed for League of Ireland Premier Division club Waterford United in 1999, and two-and-a-half years later moved on to Longford Town. During his six seasons with Longford, Kirby won two FAI Cups, in 2003 and 2004, and the 2004 League of Ireland Cup, and was nominated for the 2003 PFAI Players' Player of the Year award.

Two League runners-up medals in two years with St Patrick's Athletic preceded a third FAI Cup win and promotion from the First Division with Sporting Fingal. He won his fourth FAI Cup and third League runners-up medal in 2011 with Sligo Rovers, and retired from playing after one last season with Longford Town in 2012. Kirby made sixteen appearances in the UEFA Cup and UEFA Europa League, six each for Longford Town and St Patrick's Athletic, and two each for Sporting Fingal and Sligo Rovers.

Kirby was capped for Ireland at levels from under-16 to under-21, and was a member of the under-20 team that won the bronze medal at the 1997 FIFA World Youth Championship. He played for the League of Ireland XI that faced Manchester United in a match to mark the opening of the Aviva Stadium in 2010.

== Personal life ==
Kirby was born in Waterford, the son of former Waterford United player and assistant manager Dave Kirby and his wife Angela. He married Caitriona Norton, and as of May 2018, the couple had two daughters, Leah and Lauren.

Kirby started a degree in business studies at Dublin City University in 2007, alongside his football career. After completing his studies, he began a career in tax consultancy in Dublin.

== Club career ==
=== Early career ===
As a youngster, Kirby played for Johnville in the Waterford Schoolboys League. In the summer of 1994, as a 16-year-old, he went to England to join Premier League club Aston Villa. He was a regular in the youth team for two seasons, made his debut for the reserves in the 1995–96 season, and played not infrequently at that level for a further two years.

=== Waterford United ===
Kirby returned to Ireland, signed for Waterford United in 1998, and made his League of Ireland debut against Bohemians at the Waterford Regional Sports Centre on 29 January 1999. His first senior goal opened the scoring as Waterford beat Dundalk 2–0 on 16 April, and his second, a "glorious 20-yard volley that simply flew past" the goalkeeper, was the only goal of the game against fellow relegation candidates Bray Wanderers a few days later and made a significant contribution to Waterford retaining their Premier Division status.

Available on a free transfer at the end of the season, Kirby returned to England for a trial with Hartlepool United which came to nothing. He rejoined Waterford for the 1999–2000 League of Ireland season, but the club struggled to score, finished tenth in the league, and had to play off against Kilkenny City for a place in the next season's Premier Division. Waterford lost the first leg 1–0, and their ill-fortune in front of goal continued in the second. Kirby shot against the post in the first half, and missed a chance in the second, and Derek McGrath missed a late penalty, to leave Waterford in the First Division with only three contracted players, of which Kirby himself was one.

Kirby helped Waterford reach the semi-final of the FAI Cup in 2000–01. In the quarter-final, his shot was punched over the bar by a Cobh Ramblers defender, and he converted the resulting penalty to give Waterford a 1–0 win. The semi-final, against Longford Town, went to a replay. Kirby came close to scoring, and was named man of the match as he had been in the quarter-final, but the tie was settled by a penalty kick in favour of Longford. He was named in the PFAI First Division Team of the Year for 2001, and shortlisted for the First Division Player of the Year award.

When Kirby and teammate Alan Reynolds signed two-year contracts with Premier Division club Longford Town, Reynolds moved on a free, but the fee for Kirby was to be determined by tribunal. He had attracted the attention of manager Stephen Kenny when the clubs met in the FAI Cup semifinal earlier in the year.

=== Longford Town ===
Kirby made his debut in the FAI Super Cup pre-season tournament, and scored twice on the opening day of the league season in a 4–1 defeat of Cork City. He played in the club's first appearances in European competition, the qualifying round of the 2001–02 UEFA Cup, against Litex Lovech, which Longford lost in stoppage time in the second leg in Bulgaria. Kirby scored six goals from 40 appearances in all competitions as Longford finished ninth in the League. The Premier Division was to drop from twelve to ten teams for the transitional 2002–03 League of Ireland season, so Longford had to play-off against First Division runners-up Finn Harps to retain their top-flight status. The scores were level after two legs, and Longford won 6–5 on penalties.

Kirby was ever-present during the 2002–03 season, scoring three times as Longford finished fifth. They reached the 2003 League of Ireland Cup Final via a 90th-minute equaliser against Derry City followed by the winner in the last minute of extra time, when Kirby's free kick struck the post and Alan Murphy converted the rebound. St Patrick's Athletic goalkeeper Chris Adamson made "the save of the night" from Kirby towards the end of the final, which Longford lost by a single goal when Barry Ferguson missed a penalty with the last kick of the game. They went one better against the same opponents in the FAI Cup Final. Playing at Lansdowne Road, on a bigger pitch that allowed the wingers more space, Kirby fed Sean Francis to open the scoring, as Longford went on to beat St Pat's 2–0 to win the first senior trophy in their history. His performance over the season earned him a nomination for the PFAI Player of the Year award, but he lost out to Shelbourne's Jason Byrne.

Kirby made more appearances than any other Longford player as the club trebled its trophy collection in 2004. In the League Cup Final, the Daily Mirror wrote that he made clever use of the ball on the right wing, and came close to scoring a "wonder goal" when he dribbled past a couple of defenders but then shot wide. Longford had the better of most of the game, but were under pressure at the end, eventually holding on to beat Bohemians 2–1. Longford were a goal behind after 86 minutes in the 2004 FAI Cup Final against Kirby's home-town club Waterford when his "stunning shot" tied the scores. Controversially, the goal was scored while a Waterford defender was clearing a stray football from the pitch. Longford's winner came a few seconds later. Kirby was left with mixed feelings. While pleased to have scored only his second goal of the season, and recognising the importance of the win to his current club, he had decided ahead of the game that he would not celebrate if he did score, and felt "a little gutted" for his former colleagues. He turned down a move to Drogheda United, who reportedly offered to triple his wages, to sign a new two-year contract on improved terms with Longford.

In 2004, Longford had given Liechtenstein's FC Vaduz their first ever European win, in the UEFA Cup qualifying rounds. In the 2005 competition, they took a 2–0 first-leg lead against Welsh club Carmarthen Town; the second goal was scored by Ferguson from Kirby's cross. In the second leg, Carmarthen's opener was equalised from the penalty spot, but they then scored four times in the second half to eliminate Longford and give Kirby what he describes as "the lowest moment of my career". He is one of three men to have played in all six, as of 2015, of Longford's appearances in UEFA competition.

Kirby was the only ever-present for Longford in 2006, and was also their leading goalscorer, but with just six goals. This took his figures to 24 goals from 235 games in all competitions for Longford as his contract expired at the end of the season. With the club's budget set to be reduced further, Kirby was one of several players to leave. He signed for St Patrick's Athletic in December 2006; the season preview in the Irish Independent saw "the capture of Alan Kirby [as] a particular coup."

=== St Patrick's Athletic ===
While at Longford, Kirby had worked full-time for the club's sponsors as assistant to the site engineer on a building site, but was allowed to leave early on training evenings. At St Pat's, he was a full-time footballer. He was named Player of the Month for March, cited as central to St Pat's unbeaten start to the season. Pat's began the season with Kirby, Keith Fahey and Joseph Ndo in a central three in midfield; their "interchanging of passing and movement is excellent", according to Bohemians' manager Sean Connor. But an injury to Ndo, combined with Kirby's absences through injury and suspension, meant a switch to a 4–4–2 formation, with more workmanlike players in the centre and the flair and creativity of Fahey and Kirby pushed out to the wings; this coincided with a mid-season slump. Kirby was rested for the first leg of the UEFA Cup tie against Odense, a goalless draw; he was brought back for the second leg, in which St Pat's were outclassed 5–0. Both player and club revived; Kirby scored four goals from 28 league appearances, as his club finished in second place.

St Pat's beat Latvian club Olimps and IF Elfsborg of Sweden in the qualifying rounds of the 2008–09 UEFA Cup. Kirby was an unused substitute in the first leg against Elfsborg, and a hard-working substitute as St Pat's scored two late goals to go through on aggregate. He started on the left of midfield in both legs against Hertha Berlin; despite the 2–0 away defeat, he described that as "the best trip so far" of his five UEFA Cup campaigns. St Pat's repeated their second-place league finish in 2008, but Kirby was "a little disappointed" by his personal season. He would have preferred to play more than he did – he started 18 of the 36 league matches – and was led to expect a new contract which, in the club's straitened financial circumstances, failed to materialise. Amid general economic uncertainty, he was appreciative of an offer from Liam Buckley to join Sporting Fingal for their second season in the league.

=== Sporting Fingal ===
The Fingal Independent labelled him a "big name signing" who was "regarded as a consummate professional by commentators in the game". The club's commitment to supporting players wanting to further their education allowed him to continue his studies alongside his football: "I'm in DCU, doing a degree in business, which I'm halfway through. I can come in and train, then go on to college and catch up on any lectures I've missed and stay as late as I want in the library." In that season's FAI Cup, Kirby scored twice in the quarter-final against Shamrock Rovers, and in the semifinal, against Bray Wanderers, he set up his club's first goal, was involved in the second, and scored the third, before leaving the field through injury. Fingal finished third in the First Division, and beat Shelbourne and Bray Wanderers in the playoffs to earn promotion to the Premier Division after only two years in the League. Kirby was a late substitute in the second leg of the final, having missed the earlier matches with a foot injury, and won his third FAI Cup-winners' medal as an unused substitute, as Sporting Fingal beat Sligo Rovers with two late goals.

Kirby signed another one-year contract for the 2010 season. He was a less frequent member of the starting eleven, but still took the field in 31 of the 36 League matches as Fingal finished fifth and qualified for the UEFA Cup. In August, he was chosen for the League of Ireland XI to face Manchester United in a match to mark the official opening of the Aviva Stadium. United captain John O'Shea said afterwards he "was glad to see Kirbs getting a game as he's such a dedicated player, for the league and for Ireland".

=== Later career ===
Kirby was one of many players to volunteer for the PFAI team to take part in the FIFPro Scandinavian Tournament in January 2011, a regular event featuring out-of-contract players from summer leagues, but did not make the squad. Liam Buckley planned to speak to him about returning to Sporting Fingal, but at the end of the month, Kirby signed a one-year contract with Sligo Rovers. He scored six times in 31 league appearances as Sligo finished second in the Premier Division, and collected his fourth FAI Cup-winners' medal, again as an unused substitute, as Sligo beat Shelbourne on penalties at the Aviva Stadium.

When no new contract was forthcoming at Sligo, and recognising he was approaching the end of the career, Kirby was happy to return to Longford Town for the 2012 season. Together with fellow veteran Keith Gillespie, he lent experience to the squad, helping Longford to a third-place finish and a playoff against Waterford United. Replacing Gillespie towards the end of the playoff second leg, with Waterford 3–0 ahead on aggregate, Kirby scored his last goal in senior football in his home town against his first senior club. He had announced his retirement from football before the game. In his two spells with Longford, he scored 29 goals from 264 appearances in all competitions.

== International career ==
Kirby was capped for Ireland under-16s while a Johnville player in 1994. He was a member of the under-18 team that qualified for the 1996 UEFA Youth Championship finals in Luxembourg, and played in the finals. Ireland finished third in their group, so qualified for the 1997 FIFA World Youth Championship in Malaysia. Kirby was an unused substitute for Ireland's opening fixture, against Ghana, but played in their remaining matches as they became the first and, as of 2017, only Irish side to win a medal at a FIFA World Cup at any age agroup. Played in by Robbie Ryan early in the match, Kirby's failure to score was, according to the Irish Times, "the product of good goalkeeping rather than poor finishing", and Colin Hawkins headed wide from his cross with only a few minutes left, as Ireland lost 1–0 to Argentina in the semifinal. He was a first-half substitute as Ireland defeated Ghana in the third-place match to win the bronze medal. Those two matches were televised live in Ireland, and the players became well known as their progress was followed by RTÉ's magazine programme The Soccer Show.

Kirby made his only appearance at under-21 level as a substitute in a 3–0 defeat against the Czech Republic in March 1998.

== Style of play ==
According to Kirby's profile on the St Patrick's Athletic website, he "can play anywhere across the midfield and chips in with his fair share of goals." He has been used most often as a right-sided winger, though he said he liked playing in the centre of midfield because on the wing, "sometimes the game will pass you by and you're relying on other people to get you into the game." Ahead of the 1997 FIFA World Youth Championship semifinal, manager Brian Kerr was reportedly considering using him in a man-marking role.

In 2001, the Galway Advertiser wrote that his "blistering pace is an invaluable asset when his side is on the break." He combined creativity with industry. An RTÉ match report in 2008 claimed that "the workrate and creativity of Pat's centre midfield pairing of Alan Kirby and Keith Fahey can't be underestimated". And the Sligo Champion's preview of a 2011 FAI Cup quarter-final summed him up as "a tireless worker with an eye for a defence splitting pass and an ability to ghost into dangerous attacking positions".

== Honours ==
Republic of Ireland

- FIFA World Youth Championship: bronze medal 1997

Longford Town

- FAI Cup: 2003, 2004
- League of Ireland Cup: 2004
- League of Ireland Cup: runners-up 2003

St Patrick's Athletic

- League of Ireland: runners-up 2007, 2008

Sporting Fingal

- FAI Cup: 2009

Sligo Rovers

- FAI Cup: 2011
- League of Ireland: runners-up 2011
