= Eric Lavine =

Barbadian footballer

Personal information
- Full name: Eric Lavine
- Date of birth: 21 January 1971 (age 55)
- Place of birth: Bridgetown, Barbados
- Height: 1.75 m (5 ft 9 in)
- Position: Forward

Senior career*
Years	Team	Apps	(Gls)
1989–1997	Pride of Gall Hill		
1997–2001	Galway United	113	(27)
2001–2005	Longford Town	117	(29)
2005–2006	Galway United	22	(5)
2006–2008	Athlone Town	81	(10)

International career
1992–2003	Barbados	34	(10)
- * Club domestic league appearances and goals

Eric Lavine (born 21 January 1971) is a retired Barbadian football player who played in the League of Ireland for over a decade. He has represented the Barbados national football team in World Cup qualifying matches. His cousins Richard and Donovan also are Barbados internationals.

He was the first player to score four goals in the top division of the League of Ireland. He completed this milestone while playing for Galway United against Finn Harps on the opening day of the 2000/2001 season . Jason Byrne later matched this achievement.

Joined Athlone Town in May 2006.

He played for Oranmore in the premier division of the Galway & District League after his retirement from professional football.

Eric holds the FAI Youth Certificate & will be completing the UEFA 'B' Licence in 2009.

== Honours ==
Longford Town

- FAI Cup (2): 2003, 2004
- League of Ireland Cup (1): 2004

Galway United

- League of Ireland Cup (1): 1996–97
