= Northwest derby =

Northwest derby may refer to the following association football rivalries:

- Liverpool F.C.–Manchester United F.C. rivalry
- North-west Derby (Ireland), the rivalry between Finn Harps F.C. and Derry City F.C.
