= 2016 League of Ireland Premier Division =

League of Ireland Premier Division
- Season: 2016
- Champions: Dundalk (12th title)
- Relegated: Longford Town; Wexford Youths
- Champions League: Dundalk
- Europa League: Cork City; Derry City; Shamrock Rovers
- Matches: 198
- Goals: 511 (2.58 per match)
- Top goalscorer: Sean Maguire (18 goals)
- Biggest home win: Cork City 6–0 Longford Town (14 March 2016)
- Biggest away win: Finn Harps 0–7 Dundalk (13 May 2016)
- Highest scoring: Wexford Youths 5–4 Galway United (14 October 2016)
- Highest attendance: 5,453 Cork City 1–0 Dundalk
- Total attendance: 291,258
- Average attendance: 1,471

The 2016 League of Ireland Premier Division was the 32nd season of the League of Ireland Premier Division. The league began on 4 March 2016 and concluded on 28 October 2016; the relegation play-offs followed on 31 October and 4 November 2016. The prize fund for the SSE Airtricity League Premier and First Divisions was €475,500 for the 2016 season.

Dundalk successfully defended its title for the third consecutive season on 23 October after a 2–1 win against Bohemians.

== Overview ==
The Premier Division consisted of 12 teams. Each team played each other three times, a total of 33 matches in the season.

Wexford Youths, the 2015 First Division champion, entered the top level for the first time in their history. Finn Harps were promoted after winning the promotion/relegation playoffs.

The 12 clubs competed for €371,500 in prize money ranging from €110,000 for the winners to €17,000 for the team finishing bottom of the table.

== Teams ==
Locations of 2016 Premier Division teams
Locations of 2016 Premier Division teams

Team	Home city/suburb	Stadium
Bohemians	Phibsborough, Dublin	Dalymount Park
Bray Wanderers	Bray	Carlisle Grounds
Cork City	Cork	Turner's Cross
Derry City	Derry	Brandywell Stadium
Dundalk	Dundalk	Oriel Park
Finn Harps	Ballybofey	Finn Park
Galway United	Galway	Eamonn Deacy Park
Longford Town	Longford	City Calling Stadium
Shamrock Rovers	Tallaght, Dublin	Tallaght Stadium
Sligo Rovers	Sligo	The Showgrounds
St Patrick's Athletic	Inchicore, Dublin	Richmond Park
Wexford Youths	Crossabeg	Ferrycarrig Park

=== Personnel and kits ===
Note: Flags indicate national team as has been defined under FIFA eligibility rules. Players may hold more than one non-FIFA nationality.

Team	Manager	Captain	Kit manufacturer	Shirt sponsor
Bohemians	(Republic of Ireland) Keith Long	(Republic of Ireland) Derek Pender	Hummel	Mr Green
Bray Wanderers	(Republic of Ireland) Harry Kenny	(Republic of Ireland) Conor Kenna	Nike	Sonas Bathrooms
Cork City	(Republic of Ireland) John Caulfield	(Republic of Ireland) John Dunleavy	Nike	Clonakilty Sausages
Derry City	(Northern Ireland) Kenny Shiels	(Northern Ireland) Ryan McBride	Hummel	Diamond Corrugated
Dundalk	(Republic of Ireland) Stephen Kenny	(Republic of Ireland) Stephen O'Donnell	CX+ Sport	Fyffes
Finn Harps	(Republic of Ireland) Ollie Horgan	(Republic of Ireland) Kevin McHugh	Legea	McGettigan Group
Galway United	(Republic of Ireland) Tommy Dunne	(Republic of Ireland) Ryan Connolly	Uhlsport	Comer Property Management
Longford Town	(Republic of Ireland) Tony Cousins	(Republic of Ireland) Mark Salmon	Macron	City Calling
Shamrock Rovers	(Republic of Ireland) Pat Fenlon	(Republic of Ireland) Conor Kenna	New Balance	Pepper
Sligo Rovers	(England) Dave Robertson	(Republic of Ireland) Gavin Peers	Joma	Volkswagen
St Patrick's Athletic	(Republic of Ireland) Liam Buckley	(Republic of Ireland) Ger O'Brien	Umbro	Clune Construction Company L.P.
Wexford Youths	(Republic of Ireland) Shane Keegan	(Republic of Ireland) Graham Doyle	Bodibro	SBOBET

== League table ==
Pos	Team	Pld	W	D	L	GF	GA	GD	Pts	Qualification or relegation
1	Dundalk (C)	33	25	2	6	73	28	+45	77	Qualification for Champions League second qualifying round
2	Cork City	33	21	7	5	65	23	+42	70	Qualification for Europa League first qualifying round (Note: Cork City qualified for the Europa League first qualifying round by winning the 2016 FAI Cup. However, since they already qualified for European competition based on their league position, the spot awarded to the cup winners was passed down the league.)
3	Derry City	33	17	11	5	48	29	+19	62	Qualification for Europa League first qualifying round
4	Shamrock Rovers	33	16	7	10	46	34	+12	55	Qualification for Europa League first qualifying round
5	Sligo Rovers	33	13	10	10	42	35	+7	49	
6	Bray Wanderers	33	13	7	13	39	40	−1	46	
7	St Patrick's Athletic	33	13	6	14	45	41	+4	45	
8	Bohemians	33	12	5	16	30	37	−7	41	
9	Galway United	33	10	8	15	44	54	−10	38	
10	Finn Harps	33	8	8	17	23	49	−26	32	
11	Wexford Youths (R)	33	6	5	22	31	70	−39	23	Qualification for relegation play-offs
12	Longford Town (R)	33	2	8	23	25	71	−46	14	Relegation to League of Ireland First Division

Source: Soccerway
Rules for classification: 1) Points; 2) Goal difference; 3) Goals scored.
(C) Champions; (R) Relegated

== Results ==
=== Matches 1–22 ===
Teams played each other twice (once at home, once away).

Home \ Away	BOH	BRW	COR	DER	DUN	FHA	GAL	LON	SHM	SLI	StP	WEX
Bohemians	—	0–0	0–1	0–1	0–2	2–0	1–1	2–0	0–4	1–0	5–1	3–3
Bray Wanderers	0–2	—	0–2	0–3	1–3	1–0	1–2	0–0	1–1	4–0	1–0	3–0
Cork City	2–0	4–0	—	2–1	1–0	3–1	5–3	6–0	2–0	1–2	1–0	1–1
Derry City	1–0	2–0	1–0	—	0–5	2–2	2–1	4–0	3–0	0–2	1–1	1–0
Dundalk	2–1	1–0	0–1	1–1	—	3–0	2–1	4–3	1–1	1–0	2–0	3–2
Finn Harps	0–0	1–0	0–1	2–1	0–7	—	1–0	1–0	0–1	3–0	1–2	0–1
Galway United	1–0	4–0	2–2	0–0	1–0	1–0	—	2–2	0–1	1–2	0–3	4–2
Longford Town	0–1	1–1	0–3	1–1	0–4	0–2	1–1	—	0–2	2–2	0–1	2–4
Shamrock Rovers	3–1	2–0	0–0	0–1	0–2	1–1	2–0	2–1	—	3–0	0–2	2–0
Sligo Rovers	1–0	0–0	0–0	0–0	0–1	1–1 (Note: Match abandoned due to floodlight failure. League Director ruled that the score would stand.)	1–1	3–0	0–2	—	1–0	4–1
St Patrick's Athletic	3–0	1–2	3–1	0–1	0–4	4–0	1–3	3–3	0–2	1–1	—	4–0
Wexford Youths	0–1	2–0	0–1	1–2	1–2	1–1	0–2	0–2	2–0	0–5	0–1	—

Source: SSE Airtricity League, Soccerway
Legend: Blue = home team win; Yellow = draw; Red = away team win.

=== Matches 23–33 ===
Teams played each other once.

Home \ Away	BOH	BRW	COR	DER	DUN	FHA	GAL	LON	SHM	SLI	StP	WEX
Bohemians	—	—	—	—	1–2	—	—	1–0	1–0	3–2	—	1–0
Bray Wanderers	2–1	—	4–1	2–2	2–1	—	—	—	—	4–0	2–1	—
Cork City	0–0	—	—	—	—	2–0	—	5–2	3–0	—	3–1	5–0
Derry City	2–1	—	0–0	—	—	—	0–0	—	2–2	2–1	—	—
Dundalk	—	—	2–1	3–1	—	2–0	4–1	—	—	0–3	—	—
Finn Harps	1–0	2–1	—	0–5	—	—	—	0–1	0–2	—	1–1	—
Galway United	2–0	0–2	0–5	—	—	3–2	—	0–0	—	—	—	—
Longford Town	—	0–2	—	2–3	0–3	—	—	—	2–4	—	0–1	—
Shamrock Rovers	—	0–0	—	—	0–3	—	4–2	—	—	—	0–0	3–1
Sligo Rovers	—	—	0–0	—	—	0–0	2–1	1–0	3–2	—	—	5–0
St Patrick's Athletic	0–1	—	—	0–2	5–2	—	1–0	—	—	0–0	—	4–1
Wexford Youths	—	1–3	—	0–0	0–1	0–0	5–4	2–0	—	—	—	—

Source: SSE Airtricity League, Soccerway
Legend: Blue = home team win; Yellow = draw; Red = away team win.

== Promotion/relegation playoffs ==
Wexford Youths, the eleventh-placed team from the Premier Division took part in a two-legged play-off against Drogheda United, the winners of the 2016 First Division play-off, to decide who will play in the 2017 Premier Division.

=== First leg ===
31 October 2016	Wexford Youths	2–0	Drogheda United	Crossabeg
19:45 GMT	Furlong 66'; Chin 90+1'	Report		Stadium: Ferrycarrig Park; Attendance: 616; Referee: Raymond Matthews

=== Second leg ===
4 November 2016	Drogheda United	3–0 (3–2 agg.)	Wexford Youths	Drogheda
19:45 GMT	Brennan 45+1'; Farragher 58'; Thornton 78' (pen.)	Report		Stadium: United Park; Referee: Graham Kelly

Drogheda United are promoted to the 2017 Premier Division; Wexford Youths are relegated to the 2017 First Division.

== Top scorers ==
Rank	Player	Club	Goals
1	(Republic of Ireland) Sean Maguire	Cork City	18
2	(Northern Ireland) Rory Patterson	Derry City	17
3	(Republic of Ireland) David McMillan	Dundalk	16
4	(Republic of Ireland) Vincent Faherty	Galway United	12
5	(Republic of Ireland) Conan Byrne	St Patrick's Athletic	11
6	(Republic of Ireland) Raffaele Cretaro	Sligo Rovers	10
6	(Republic of Ireland) Kurtis Byrne	Bohemians	10
6	(Republic of Ireland) Christy Fagan	St Patrick's Athletic	10
6	(Republic of Ireland) Gary McCabe	Shamrock Rovers	10
10	(Republic of Ireland) Daryl Horgan	Dundalk	9

== See also ==
- 2016 FAI Cup
- 2016 League of Ireland Cup
- 2016 League of Ireland First Division
