= North-west Derby (Ireland) =

Association football contest

The North-west Derby is the name of the association football match played between Finn Harps and Derry City. It has been hotly contested on a season-to-season basis since Derry's inception into the League of Ireland in 1985, with the rival West Ulster clubs often meeting on a number of occasions during the one season.

== History ==
The derby has existed since Derry City's entry into the League of Ireland in 1985 as a result of the close proximity of the club's respective homes to the other's. The city of Derry is located about 30 miles from the town of Ballybofey in County Donegal, where Finn Harps play.

The rivalry between the teams is fuelled by quite a substantial gulf in success and a rural-urban divide between the two. Derry's support comes largely from the city of Derry, although there is strong support for the club in Inishowen and The Laggan district of East Donegal. Finn Harps, who have been less successful historically, play in a small regional market-town in East Donegal and take their support from large parts of County Donegal. Even though they have quite a large support-base in Letterkenny, a sizable proportion of their support is derived from those who are culturally rural. Because of this, Derry fans often view and verbally abuse their Donegal neighbours as backward, in-bred "sheep-shaggers", "rednecks" or "culchies" who watch their team play in a cow-shed, relating to Finn Park, the home ground of Finn Harps. The terms have found their way into a number of club songs reserved for derby-day. Abusive and demeaning songs sung by Derry's supporters include:

You are a culchie,
A smelly cuchie,
You're only happy on market day,
Your ground's a cow-shed,
Your fans are inbred,
You're only sheep-shaggers from Ballybofey.
- Sung to the tune of You Are My Sunshine.

What's the story in Ballybofey, wouldn't you like to know?
Sheep-shagging bastards, sheep-shagging bastards.
-Repeated to the theme tune of Balamory.

What's it like to be Finn Harps?
What's it like to be small?
What's it like when your team wins nothing at all?
Nothing at all.
- Sung to the tune of This Is How It Feels by The Inspiral Carpets.

Meanwhile, Finn Harps supporters often taunt the mainly-nationalist Derry fans by rhetorically asking in chant what it is like to have a British queen, as Derry are based in Northern Ireland, while Finn Harps play across the border in the Republic of Ireland and have the common perceived pleasure of living life free from monarchical-rule. Along with chants such as You're Brits and You Know You Are and provocatively referring to the city as "Londonderry, United Kingdom", they also mock Derry fans due to their Brandywell ground's association with greyhound racing and, in response to the "sheep-shagging" taunts directed towards them, often imply that their Derry counterparts are dogs or engage in acts of bestiality with dogs. The Baha Men's Who Let the Dogs Out? is a popular song amongst Finn Harps supporters on the day of a derby.

However, it must be pointed out that the rivalry is not always a negative one. It is, in the main, a friendly, healthy one and the exchange of verbal abuse is often taken as "banter" and in good spirit and humour by the two groups of fans. Furthermore, while both clubs have encountered periods of financial trouble in recent years, they have often been helped by the other in this regard. Finn Harps were also one of the major proponents of Derry's joining of the League of Ireland in 1985. Phil Coulter is known as a fan of both sides, and has been instrumental in keeping them as operational football clubs.

Although the clubs frequently transfer local-based players between one another, after Derry signed Kevin McHugh from a relegated Finn Harps at the beginning of the 2006 season, certain elements within Derry's support vowed never to return to the Brandywell after what he had done during a controversial goal-celebration in a promotion/relegation play-off final game between the clubs on 13 December 2003. Some still refuse to sings songs in relation to the player, but the majority of fans have welcomed McHugh's impressive skill, fitness and work ethic and forgive him for his "humorous" celebration.

Despite the close rivalry between the two teams, Finn Harps have managed only 3 wins in 59 meetings, with 12 draws and 44 Derry wins. The most recent meeting, in the 2020 season ended in a 1-1 draw

== Notable games ==
13 December 2003
Promotion/relegation play-off

Derry City	2-1 (AET)	Finn Harps
M. Farren 13'; L. Coyle 101'	Match report	K. McHugh 90+5'

19:45 - Brandywell Stadium, Derry
Attendance: 7,500
Referee: Alan Kelly

Dubbed the Battle of the Brandywell by the media, there was a huge amount at stake in this game - the second leg of the 2003 League of Ireland Promotion/relegation play-off final. The game decided which of the clubs would play in the following season's Premier and First Divisions. The loser was to be resigned to playing in the lower tier while the winner was to be rewarded with the top-tier place. Derry City, having qualified for the play-offs after finishing ninth in the Premier Division, came into the game facing the daunting prospect of relegation while Finn Harps, having qualified by finishing third in the First Division, faced a potential promotion. To add further flavour to the tie, Derry had never been relegated from and division they had played in their history. Relegation would have proved a huge blow and a major humiliation.

The first leg had finished 0-0 at Finn Park on 10 December 2003, so all was still to play for. Noel King led Finn Harps into the game after previously managing Derry and guiding them to a League of Ireland title in 1997. Inflatable sheep could be seen floating over the heads of fans in the old 'Jungle' area of the stadium, while Derry came in for criticism from offended Finn Harps officials after the game, as prior to the game's beginning, a rendition of Baa Baa Black Sheep was played over the Brandywell PA system in order to taunt the opposition. The officials were also critical of the handling of security by Derry's private stewards in the stadium and a suggestion that the RUC might have done a better job was not received well in Derry. A large pitch invasion occurred after the final whistle was blown and certain Finn Harps fans had felt threatened by the excited behaviour of some of Derry's supporters. Derry are unique, due to the political situation in Northern Ireland, in that they do not have a police presence inside their ground.

By the end of the tense affair, the Finn Harps manager had also been sent from the dug-out by the referee, Alan Kelly, for losing his cool after protesting Derry's second goal in extra-time. The Derry striker, Liam Coyle, had received the ball from a quick Ciarán Martyn free-kick and as he went down under the challenge of Shane Bradley, the ball rolled past goal-keeper Gary Ramsey and into the Harps' net. Confusion abounded in the Finn Harps defence and their players had seemed to stall in response as if to suggest they believed that they had heard a whistle or that play had been brought to a halt by the referee for the bad tackle on Coyle. Two of King's players, Shane Bradley and Kevin McHugh, were also later sent off from the field of play in separate incidents during the fiery second half of extra-time. McHugh's earlier equaliser had also caused controversy. The extraordinary amount of stoppage time played, which allowed McHugh the time and chance to score, was looked upon with a degree of scepticism by Derry's support, while his celebration infuriated certain others. After hitting the back of the net with the ball, McHugh ran straight for the dog-track, crouched down and ran along on his hands and knees, emulating the actions of a racing greyhound.

The game was also City veteran Liam Coyle's last game as a player.

8 July 2005
League

Derry City	3-2	Finn Harps
D. Boyle (OG) 19'; M. Farren 27'; K. Brennan 47'	Match report	K. McHugh 30'; K. McHugh 56'

19:45 - Brandywell Stadium, Derry
Attendance: 5,000
Referee: Pat Whelan

The game took Derry's unbeaten run to 8 games that season and helped condemn their rivals to relegation from the Premier Division. The tone had been set before the game as the rivalry between the two was underlined just thirty minutes before kick-off when the match referee, Pat Whelan from Dublin, following a verbal exchange with Felix Healy, the then-manager of Finn Harps, ruled that the Harps' team boss should watch the game from the stands rather from the dug-out.

4 March 2016
League

Finn Harps	2-1	Derry City
D. Scully 45'; R. Curran 75'	Match report	R. Patterson 92'

20:00 - Finn Park, Ballybofey
Attendance: 4,500
Referee: Tomás Connolly

In their first Premier league game of 2016, Finn Harps gained their first win over Derry City since 1998.

== In popular culture ==
- A bizarre own-goal, in which the goal-keeper was lobbed from outside the box, scored by Finn Harps' Terry Leake for Derry City during a 1989-90 season Brandywell-meeting once appeared on the "What happened next?" round of the BBC's A Question of Sport.

== See also ==
- Local derby
