= Barry Ferguson (Irish footballer) =

Irish footballer

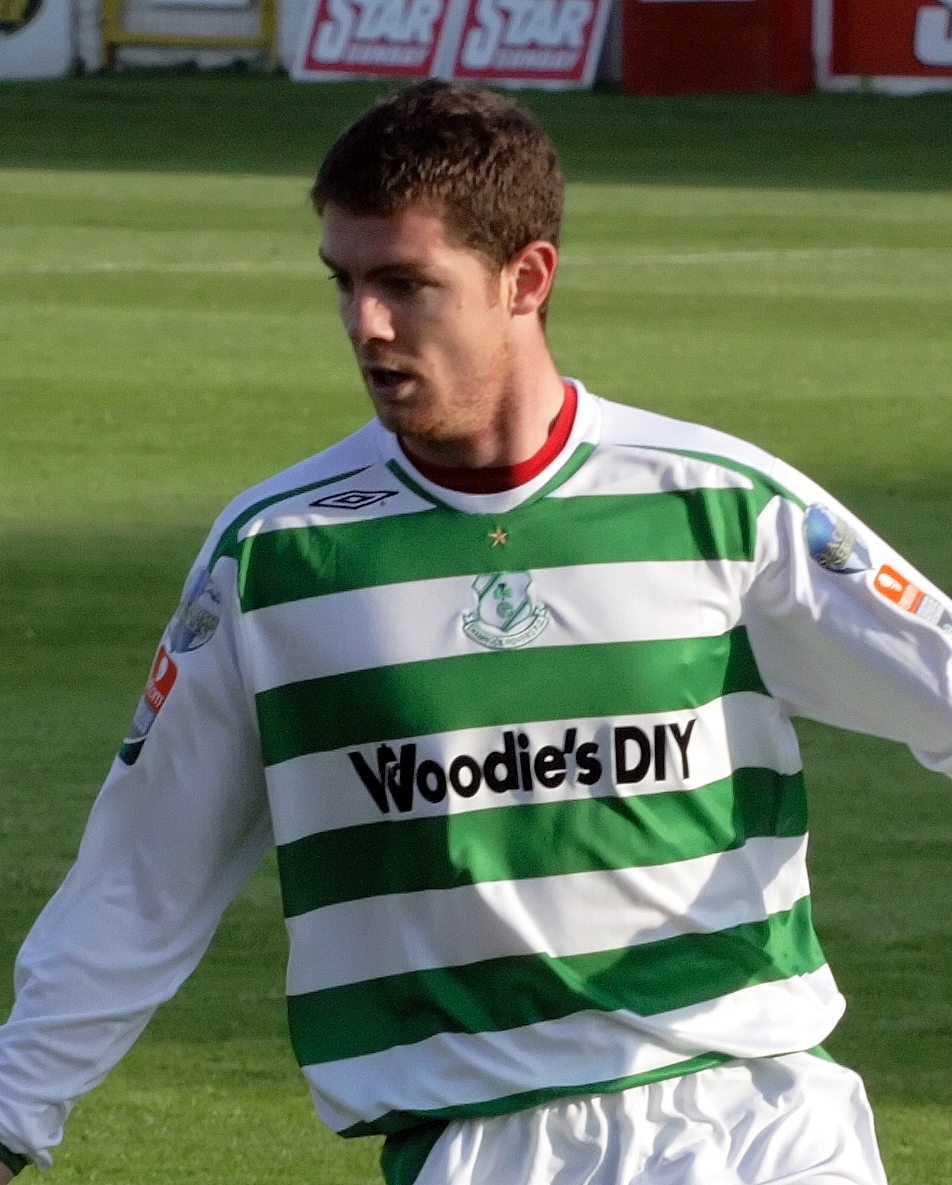
- Ferguson in 2008 with Shamrock Rovers

Personal information
- Date of birth: 7 September 1979 (age 47)
- Place of birth: Dublin, Ireland
- Position: Defender

Youth career
- Home Farm

Senior career*
Years	Team	Apps	(Gls)
1998–2002	Coventry City	0	(0)
1999–2000	→ Colchester United (loan)	6	(0)
2000–2001	→ Hartlepool United (loan)	4	(0)
2000–2001	→ Northampton Town (loan)	3	(0)
2002–2005	Longford Town	103	(10)
2006	Bohemians	28	(2)
2007–2008	Shamrock Rovers	43	(1)
2008	Sporting Fingal	13	(0)
Total		200	(13)

International career
1999–2000	Republic of Ireland U21	6	(1)
- * Club domestic league appearances and goals

Barry Ferguson (born 7 September 1979) is an Irish former professional footballer who is now a development officer with the Football Association of Ireland.

== Career ==
Ferguson began his football career with Home Farm before moving to Coventry City. While there he played at the 1999 FIFA World Youth Championship finals in Nigeria. Although he never made a competitive first team appearance for City, Ferguson went on to have brief spells in the lower divisions with Colchester United, Hartlepool United and Northampton Town.

Ferguson returned to Ireland to link up with Longford Town in the summer of 2002. He captained FAI Cup and League Cup winning teams during his three years at the midlands club. Ferguson scored in a 2004–05 UEFA Cup tie against FC Vaduz. As Longford's penalty taker he missed the chance for an equaliser in the last minute of the 2003 FAI League Cup Final.

He made his Rovers debut on the opening day of the 2007 League of Ireland season at UCD. He signed for the club from city rivals Bohemians in January 2007, having spent just one season with the Dalymount outfit.

Ferguson was forced to retire in February 2009 due to a serious hip injury.

He managed the Ireland CP national team in 2015.

== Personal life ==
He is the father of Brighton & Hove Albion striker Evan Ferguson. Barry met Evan's mother Sarah whilst playing for Coventry.

== Honours ==
Longford Town

- FAI Cup: 2003, 2004
- League of Ireland Cup: 2004
