= 2004 League of Ireland First Division =

League of Ireland First Division
- Season: 2004
- Champions: Finn Harps
- Promoted: UCD; Bray Wanderers
- Top goalscorer: Kevin McHugh: 22 (2) (Finn Harps)

The 2004 League of Ireland First Division season was the 20th season of the League of Ireland First Division.

== Overview ==
The First Division was contested by 12 teams and Finn Harps won the division. Each team played the other teams three times, totalling 33 games. The 2005 season would see the League of Ireland Premier Division revert to 12 twelve teams. To facilitate this expansion there was no promotion/relegation play-off this season and the second and third placed teams, UCD and Bray Wanderers, were automatically promoted.

== Final table ==
| Pos | Team | Pld | W | D | L | GF | GA | GD | Pts | Promotion |
|---|---|---|---|---|---|---|---|---|---|---|
| 1 | Finn Harps | 33 | 23 | 7 | 3 | 60 | 19 | +41 | 76 | Promoted to Premier Division |
| 2 | UCD | 33 | 22 | 9 | 2 | 63 | 21 | +42 | 75 | Promoted to Premier Division |
| 3 | Bray Wanderers | 33 | 19 | 8 | 6 | 62 | 29 | +33 | 65 | Promoted to Premier Division |
| 4 | Kildare County | 33 | 18 | 8 | 7 | 54 | 32 | +22 | 62 | |
| 5 | Galway United | 33 | 14 | 10 | 9 | 55 | 49 | +6 | 52 | |
| 6 | Dundalk | 33 | 14 | 4 | 15 | 46 | 57 | −11 | 46 | |
| 7 | Sligo Rovers | 33 | 11 | 5 | 17 | 46 | 50 | −4 | 38 | |
| 8 | Cobh Ramblers | 33 | 7 | 11 | 15 | 47 | 53 | −6 | 32 | |
| 9 | Kilkenny City | 33 | 6 | 9 | 18 | 28 | 53 | −25 | 27 | |
| 10 | Athlone Town | 33 | 9 | 2 | 22 | 42 | 68 | −26 | 26 (Note: Athlone Town deducted 3 points for fielding an unregistered player.) | |
| 11 | Monaghan United | 33 | 8 | 5 | 20 | 28 | 63 | −35 | 26 (Note: Monaghan United deducted 3 points for fielding an unregistered player.) | |
| 12 | Limerick | 33 | 4 | 8 | 21 | 18 | 55 | −37 | 20 | |

== Top scorers ==
| Player | Club | Goals |
|---|---|---|
| Kevin McHugh | Finn Harps | 22 |
| Éamon Zayed | Bray Wanderers | 17 |
| Martin Reilly | Kildare County | 16 |
| Willie Doyle | UCD | 16 |
| Trevor Vaughan | Dundalk | 14 |

== Gallery ==
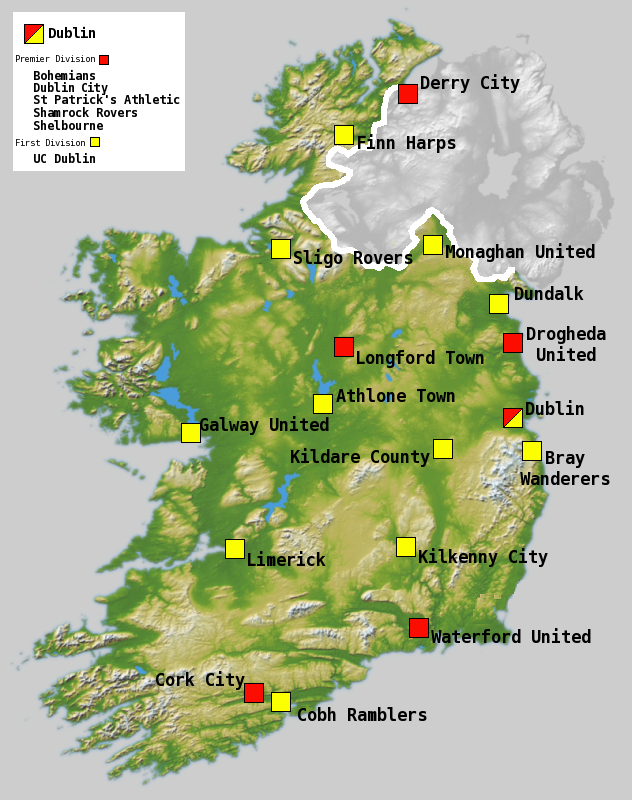
The locations of the clubs that competed in the 2004 League of Ireland season

== See also ==
- 2004 League of Ireland Premier Division
- 2004 League of Ireland Cup
