= Stephen Gough (footballer) =

Irish footballer

Personal information
- Full name: Stephen Gough
- Date of birth: 21 March 1981 (age 45)
- Place of birth: Dublin, Ireland
- Position: Full back

Team information
- Current team: Crumlin United F.C.

Senior career*
Years	Team	Apps	(Gls)
2000–2001	Bray Wanderers	1	(0)
2000–2001	Drogheda United	2	(0)
2002–2003	Monaghan United	0	(0)
2002–2005	Shamrock Rovers	101	(7)
2005–2006	Longford Town	37	(0)
2007	Bray Wanderers	15	(0)
2008–2009	Longford Town	44	(1)
Total		190	(8)
- * Club domestic league appearances and goals

Stephen Gough (born 21 March 1981 in Dublin, Ireland) is an Irish footballer who plays for Crumlin United F.C. in the Leinster Senior League.

He began his career at Bray Wanderers F.C. and then signed for a short spell at Monaghan United at the start of the shortened 2002/03 season. He signed for Shamrock Rovers shortly after and made his Rovers debut on 11 October 2002.

He made four appearances in the UEFA Intertoto Cup, before transferring to Longford in July 2005.

In December 2006, he signed back for Bray Wanderers F.C., but was released at the end of the 2007 season.

== Honours ==
- SRFC Young Player of the Year:
  - Shamrock Rovers – 2002/03
