= 2004 FAI Cup final =

- Event: 2004 FAI Cup
Longford Town	Waterford United
2	1
- Date: 24 October 2004
- Venue: Lansdowne Road, Dublin
- Referee: J. Feighery
- Attendance: 9,676

The 2004 FAI Cup final was the deciding match of the 2004 FAI Cup. Defending champions Longford Town contested the final against Waterford United. The match was played at Lansdowne Road in Dublin. Longford won the match 2–1.

== Details ==
24 October 2004

Waterford United	1–2	Longford Town
Bruton 62'	Report	Kirby 86'; Keegan 88'

Lansdowne Road, Dublin
Attendance: 9,676
Referee: John Feighery
