= Paul Keegan (footballer, born 1972) =

Irish footballer

Personal information
- Date of birth: 30 December 1972 (age 53)
- Place of birth: Dublin, Ireland
- Positions: Midfielder; striker

College career
Years	Team	Apps	(Gls)
1992–1996	Boston College Eagles	85	(33)

Senior career*
Years	Team	Apps	(Gls)
1991–1992	St Patrick's Athletic	30	(10)
1996–2000	New England Revolution	84	(7)
1997	→ Worcester Wildfire (loan)	7	(4)
2000	→ Boston Bulldogs (loan)	4	(2)
2000	→ Connecticut Wolves (loan)	2	(1)
2000–2002	Bray Wanderers	37?	(21)
2002–2004	Bohemians	65	(18)
2004–2006	Longford Town	53	(19)
2006	St Patrick's Athletic	54	(19)
2007	Motherwell	10	(0)
2007–2008	Partick Thistle	21	(2)
2008–2009	Dumbarton	21	(3)
2009–2010	Airdrie United	29	(1)
2010–2011	Beith Juniors		
- * Club domestic league appearances and goals

Paul Keegan (born 30 December 1972) is an Irish former professional footballer. Keegan was the first Irishman to play in Major League Soccer in the United States.

== Club career ==
Keegan joined St Patrick's Athletic from schoolboy football team Crumlin United, where he broke the scoring record for the club with 33 goals in 29 games in 2001. In 1992, after his first year with Pat's and Brian Kerr's successful side, Keegan accepted the offer of a soccer scholarship by Boston College where he learned his trade under the tutelage of renowned coach Ed Kelly. Keegan represented his country in the World University Games in Buffalo, USA in 1992.

=== New England Revolution ===
After a successful college career, which seen him win Big East Rookie of the Year, Big East Player of the Year and All American honours twice, Keegan was drafted by the New England Revolution as their number one pick in the first ever MLS college draft in 1996 by Frank Stapelton on March 4, 1996. He made his Revolution debut on April 20, 1996, coming on as a 78th minute substitute for Geoff Aunger in the Revolution's first-ever win, 1-0 over the MetroStars. He scored his first Revolution goal on May 19, 1996, in the Revolution's 2-0 victory over the MetroStars. Keegan played in 27 total league matches, making 20 starts, in the Revolution's inaugural campaign, scoring four goals and adding three assists. In 1997, Keegan provided the 88th-minute deciding goal as the Revolution took a 2-1 win over the Dallas Burn at the Cotton Bowl on the final day of the 1997 season, clinching the team's first playoff berth. Primarily used as a substitute, Keegan stayed with the "Revs" for 5 total seasons, making a total of 84 league appearances, scoring 7 goals and notching 10 assists. In his last season with the Revs, Keegan was honored with Boston's prestigious "Sportsman of the Year Award" for outstanding service to the community.

In 2000 Keegan played four times for the Boston Bulldogs in the US A-League to help recover from an ACL knee injury. On November 1, 2000, the Revolution placed Keegan on waivers.

=== Later career ===
Keegan got his first taste of League of Ireland football when he was loaned to St Patrick's Athletic in 1999 because of the long off season in the MLS. Playing mostly off the substitutes bench, Keegan helped Pats secure their second successive league championship. At the end of his loan spell he returned to New England. The following year he returned home to Ireland and joined Bray Wanderers and his performances there earned a move to title chasing Bohemians in 2002. Bohemians won the league in Keegan's first season as he developed a great relationship with league leading scorer, Glen Crowe. He won the goal of the year award for his famous over head kick versus Bray Wanderers. In 2004, Keegan joined Longford Town and ended the season by scoring the winning goal in the 2004 FAI Cup final. Keegan joined his childhood team, St Patrick's Athletic for the second time as manager John McDonnell looked for experienced strikers to add to his young team.

After a year back with St Patrick's and an outstanding year in partnership with Trevor Molloy which seen them score 35 goals between them, he moved to Motherwell in January 2007 for an undisclosed fee and to be with his family.

He moved to Scotland's Partick Thistle in August 2007, he joined Dumbarton in the Scottish Football League Third Division. Keegan helped the Sons to win the Third Division championship in May 2009. In his last year of professional football, Keegan signed for Airdrie United on 22 July 2009.

== Honours ==
Bray Wanderers

- League of Ireland Division 1: 2001

Bohemians

- League of Ireland: 2003

Longford Town

- FAI Cup: 2004
- League of Ireland Cup: 2004

Dumbarton

- Scottish Third Division: 2009
