= Dessie Baker =

Irish footballer

Personal information
- Full name: Desmond Baker
- Date of birth: 25 August 1977 (age 49)
- Place of birth: Dublin, Republic of Ireland
- Positions: Midfielder; striker

Team information
- Current team: Edenderry Town (manager)

Youth career
- 1994–1996: Manchester United

Senior career*
Years	Team	Apps	(Gls)
1996–2004	Shelbourne	156	(27)
2003	→ University College Dublin (loan)	1	(0)
2004–2007	Longford Town	106	(19)
2008–2010	Shamrock Rovers	59	(11)
2008	→ Dundalk (loan)	10	(2)
2010–	Edenderry Town		

International career
1997	Republic of Ireland B	1	(0)
1997–1999	Republic of Ireland U21	3	(0)
- * Club domestic league appearances and goals

Desmond Baker (born 25 August 1977) is a former Irish footballer.

== Early career ==
From Tallaght Baker was a graduate of Dublin youth clubs Marks Celtic and Stella Maris, before spending his late teens as a trainee at Manchester United. Baker enjoyed a fruitful career at youth level, winning the FA Youth Cup and Youth League with Manchester United and numerous schoolboy international caps for Republic of Ireland. Baker played for the Republic of Ireland national under-19 football team in the 1996 UEFA European Under-18 Championship finals in Luxembourg and scored against Italy. Although he was named the FAI Youth Player of the Year in 1995 he failed to earn a professional contract at Old Trafford, however, and after a brief detour to Oldham returned to Ireland in the summer of 1996, having been offered a contract by League of Ireland club, Shelbourne.

== League of Ireland career ==
He made his League of Ireland debut at UCD on 15 December 1995 and would remain a fixture in the Shels line-up for the remainder of the decade, but rose to wider prominence as a member of Brian Kerr's Republic of Ireland squad which placed third at the 1997 FIFA Under-20 World Cup. Baker famously headed the opening goal of Ireland's 2–1 victory over Ghana in the third/fourth place play-off after less than a minute of play had elapsed.

He had already represented his country at U16 and U18 levels.

Baker (who scored another memorable goal against Kilmarnock in the 1997–98 Cup Winners' Cup, although Shels eventually lost the tie) was an integral member of the Shelbourne team which won the League of Ireland championship under Dermot Keely in 1999–2000, frequently operating on the left-hand side of a forward trident which also featured his brother Richie on the opposite flank.

Another league title followed in 2001–02, but this time Shels were crowned champions under contentious and unsatisfactory circumstances, while Baker himself hardly muddied his boots all season. Keely, bemoaning the pressures of full-time football management, vacated his position, and his successor Pat Fenlon consigned Baker almost permanently to the substitutes' bench.

Baker served out the remainder of his contract during two frustrating and largely inactive seasons under Fenlon (incorporating a brief loan spell at UCD), before signing a two-year contract with Longford Town in January 2004. Longford manager Alan Matthews (formerly attached to the coaching staff at Shels) declared that "[Baker is] a good asset to us and he has something to prove to people after his last two seasons which have seen him play very little football." Baker himself was of the opinion that "the squad of players he [Matthews] has should see us challenging for more silverware next season." This view was instantly vindicated as Longford won their maiden FAI Cup in 2003, a feat they remarkably reprised in 2004, when the additional conquest of the League of Ireland Cup reinforced the club's status as connoisseurs of knockout football.

Despite participation in the UEFA Cup and newly instituted Setanta Sports Cup, Longford's form deteriorated markedly, resulting in relegation at the end of the 2007 season despite reaching the FAI Cup Final.

Baker signed for Shamrock Rovers in December 2007. He made his league debut for the Hoops on 8 March 2008, and scored his first goal on 21 March against Bray Wanderers. Despite a positive start to his Rovers career, Baker fell out of favour with Rovers manager Pat Scully and in July 2008 Baker was loaned to First Division title challengers Dundalk for the remainder of that season. Baker won a First Division winners medal with Dundalk as they pipped his former club Shelbourne to the title on a dramatic ending to the final night of the season.

Baker returned to Shamrock Rovers for the 2009 season and his faltering Rovers career was given a new lease of life by new manager Michael O'Neill. Baker re-established himself in the Rovers starting XI after instantly developing a formidable partnership with Gary Twigg as Rovers finished 2nd in the Premier Division. During the season Baker appeared as a second-half substitute in a friendly match against Real Madrid at Tallaght Stadium on 20 July 2009. The game was noted for Cristiano Ronaldo's Real Madrid debut. Baker missed an opportunity to put Shamrock Rovers ahead, and soon after Karim Benzema grabbed a late winner for the Spanish outfit.

In 2010, numerous injuries hampered Baker over the course of the season resulting in him announcing his intention to retire from football at the end of the season. He capped off his League of Ireland career by winning his fourth title as Shamrock Rovers won the 2010 Premier Division title on the final day of the season.

In his time at the Hoops, Baker scored a total of 19 goals in 75 total appearances.

== Honours ==
=== Club ===
Shelbourne

- League of Ireland: 1999–2000, 2001–02, 2003
- FAI Cup: 1997, 2000

Shamrock Rovers

- 2010

Longford Town

- 2004
- League of Ireland Cup: 2004

Dundalk

- League of Ireland First Division: 2008

=== International ===
- FIFA World Youth Championship: Third Place 1997
