= Eddie McCallion =

Northern Irish footballer (born 1979)

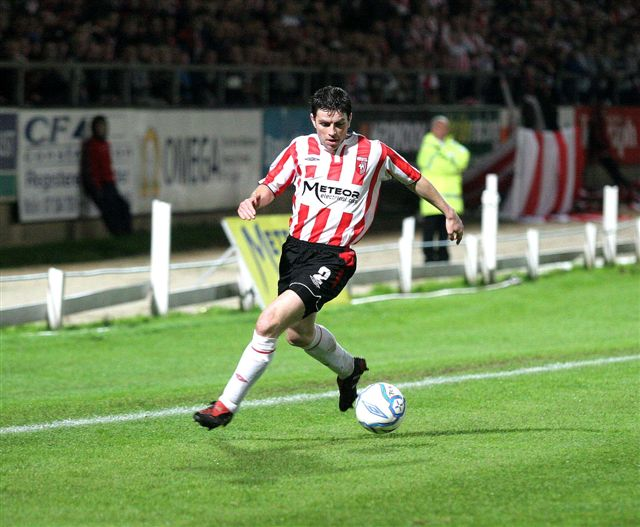

Personal information
- Date of birth: 25 January 1979 (age 47)
- Place of birth: Derry, Northern Ireland
- Position: Right-back

Youth career
- 1995–1997: Oxford United Stars
- 1997–1998: Blackburn Rovers

Senior career*
Years	Team	Apps	(Gls)
1998–2012	Derry City	518	(3)
2012–2014	Glenavon	112	(0)
2014–2015	Bangor	5	(0)
Total		635	(3)

International career
1998	Northern Ireland U21	1	(0)
- * Club domestic league appearances and goals

Edward McCallion (born 25 January 1979), commonly known as Eddie McCallion, is a Northern Irish former association footballer who played as a right-back.

== Club career ==
McCallion stands in as captain of Derry City in the absence of Peter Hutton.

=== Blackburn Rovers ===
Having played with local Derry and District League club, Oxford United, as a youth from 1995, McCallion was spotted by Blackburn Rovers in 1997 and moved to the English club that same year. Spending just a year at Ewood Park, he never managed to break into the first-team whilst there.

=== Derry City ===
McCallion signed for his home town club from Blackburn Rovers in 1998 and made his debut away to Cork City on 6 September 1998. He was the first choice right-back and also performed at centre-back when required.

Dropped from the side for Damian Brennan at the start of the 2005 season, he fought his way back into the team and by the end of the season he was the first choice right-back, helping his club to a second-place finish in the league. He scored an important goal against Kildare County in the FAI Cup that same season and his overlapping runs offered Derry City FC another attacking option.

McCallion often deputised in the role of captain when Peter Hutton was absent. McCallion had captained the side on 13 occasions by the end of the 2006 season - one of the most notable of these being Derry City's UEFA Cup First Round 0–0 draw against Paris Saint-Germain at the Brandywell Stadium on 14 September 2006.

McCallion made 52 appearances in all competitions during the 2006 season, the most of any City player that season, and, once again, helped the club finish as runners-up in the league for a second season running, consolidating his position as a firm fan-favourite.

The defender is one of the few brothers to have played in a winning FAI Cup side, as he appeared with brother Tommy in the 2002 final team.

After 14 years, McCallion made his final appearance for Derry against former longtime manager Stephen Kenny's Shamrock Rovers. He came on as a stoppage time substitute to thunderous applause from the Brandywell faithful. He would then join Glenavon on a two-year contract.

=== Glenavon ===
McCallion signed for Glenavon on a two-year deal in July 2012, and made a total of 112 NIFL Premiership appearances for the club.

=== Bangor ===
He signed for NIFL Championship One club Bangor in the summer of 2014, and made five substitute appearances during the 2014–15 season.

== International career ==
McCallion played for Northern Ireland at schoolboy, youth and under-21 level.

== Honours ==
Derry City

- FAI Cup: 2002, 2006
- League of Ireland Cup (6): 1999–2000, 2005, 2006, 2007, 2008, 2011

Glenavon

- Irish Cup: 2013–14
