= 2004 FAI Cup =

Carlsberg FAI Senior Cup

Tournament details
- Country: Ireland
- Teams: 42

Final positions
- Champions: Longford Town
- Runners-up: Waterford United

Tournament statistics
- Matches played: 64

The FAI Cup 2004 was the 84th staging of The Football Association of Ireland Challenge Cup or Carlsberg FAI Cup. It officially kicked off in late May, when twenty clubs from the junior and intermediate leagues battled it out for the chance to face League of Ireland opposition in the second round. The ten winners of those ties were joined in the second round by the 22 eircom League of Ireland clubs. The competition ran until October, with the final taking place on Sunday, October 24.

== First round ==
Matches played on the weekend of Sunday, 23 May 2004.

Tie no	Home team	Score	Away team
1	Belgrove	0–1	Leeds A.F.C.
2	Carrick United	3–2	Bluebell United
3	Cherry Orchard	1–2	Glebe North
4	Drumcondra A.F.C.	1–1	Letterkenny Rovers
replay	Letterkenny Rovers	0–2	Drumcondra A.F.C.
5	Fairview Rangers	0–2	Wayside Celtic
6	Freebooters	3–3	Portmarnock
replay	Portmarnock	w/o	Freebooters
7	Moyle Park College	1–1	Quay Celtic
replay	Quay Celtic	2–1	Moyle Park College
8	Ringmahon Rangers	3–0	CYM Terenure
9	Rockmount	2–2	College Corinthians
replay	College Corinthians	2–3	Rockmount
10	Tullamore	1–1	Bangor Celtic
replay	Bangor Celtic	0–1	Tullamore

== Second round ==
Matches played on the weekend of Sunday, 25 July 2004.

Tie no	Home team	Score	Away team
1	Rockmount	3–1	Portmarnock
2	Waterford United	2–1	Sligo Rovers
3	Shamrock Rovers	3–0	Carrick United
4	Shelbourne	4–1	Finn Harps
5	St Patrick's Athletic	4–1	Wayside Celtic
6	Cobh Ramblers	3–3	Limerick
replay	Limerick	2–2 (2–3 p)	Cobh Ramblers
7	Leeds A.F.C.	0–3	Longford Town
8	Monaghan United	1–0	Dublin City
9	Bray Wanderers	0–2	Kilkenny City
10	Athlone Town	3–0	Tullamore
11	Galway United	0–1	Derry City
12	Bohemians	8–0	Ringmahon Rangers
13	Kildare County	4–0	Glebe North
14	Dundalk	0–0	Drogheda United
replay	Drogheda United	3–2	Dundalk
15	Quay Celtic	3–4	Drumcondra
16	UCD	1–0	Cork City

== Third round ==
Matches played on the week of Monday, 16 August 2004.

Tie no	Home team	Score	Away team
1	Shelbourne	1–1	Derry City
replay	Derry City	0–0 (5–3 p)	Shelbourne
2	UCD	5–0	Drumcondra
3	Waterford United	7–2	Kilkenny City
4	Bohemians	0–1	Kildare County
5	Athlone Town	1–0	Cobh Ramblers
6	Drogheda United	2–0	St Patrick's Athletic
7	Longford Town	1–1	Shamrock Rovers
replay	Shamrock Rovers	0–1	Longford Town
8	Rockmount	2–0	Monaghan United

== Quarter-finals ==
9 September 2004

Derry City	1–0	Kildare County
McCallion 89'

Brandywell Stadium

10 September 2004

Waterford United	2–2	Rockmount
O'Brien 72' (o.g.); Bruton 81'		Hurley 48'; Keane 51'

Waterford RSC

10 September 2004

UCD	0–0	Drogheda United

Belfield Park

11 September 2004

Longford Town	2–2	Athlone Town
Fitzgerald 7'; Lavine 23'		Murphy 32'; Hope 89'

Flancare Park

=== Replays ===
13 September 2004

Drogheda United	3–2 (a.e.t.)	UCD
O'Brien 73', 93'; Lester 117'		Martin 2'; McAuley 114'

United Park

13 September 2004

Athlone Town	0–3	Longford Town
		Barrett 21'; Murphy 77'; Keogh 80'

St Mel's Park

15 September 2004

Rockmount	1–2	Waterford United
Busteed 76'		Bruton 1', 75'

Turners Cross

== Semi-finals ==
1 October 2004

Derry City	1–2	Waterford United
Byrne 12'		Murphy 8'; Connor 40'

The Brandywell, Derry

3 October 2004

Longford Town	0–0	Drogheda United

Flancare Park, Longford

=== Replay ===
5 October 2004

Drogheda United	1–2 (a.e.t.)	Longford Town
O'Brien 50'		Martin 32'; Dillon 114'

United Park, Drogheda

== Final ==
The final was played at Lansdowne Road. Paul Keegan scored the winner with his first goal for Longford Town.

24 October 2004

Waterford United	1–2	Longford Town
Bruton 62'	Report	Kirby 86'; Keegan 88'

Lansdowne Road, Dublin
Attendance: 9,676
Referee: John Feighery

Winner of FAI Cup 2004

Longford Town
2nd Title
