= Jason Byrne (footballer) =

Irish footballer (born 1978)

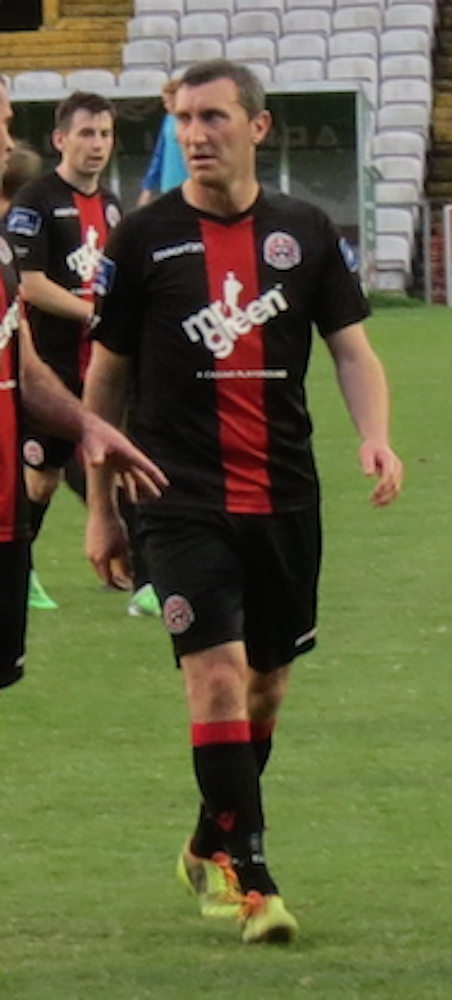
- Byrne playing for Bohemians in 2014

Personal information
- Date of birth: 23 February 1978 (age 48)
- Place of birth: Dublin, Ireland
- Height: 1.78 m (5 ft 10 in)
- Position: Forward

Youth career
- Crumlin United
- –1998: St Colmcille's

Senior career*
Years	Team	Apps	(Gls)
1998–2003	Bray Wanderers	128	(49)
2003–2006	Shelbourne	122	(83)
2007–2008	Cardiff City	10	(1)
2008–2010	Bohemians	93	(41)
2011	Dundalk	28	(6)
2012–2013	Bray Wanderers	40	(28)
2014–2015	Bohemians	34	(10)
2016	UCD	17	(4)
2017	Cabinteely	11	(1)
2017–2019	Bluebell United	17	(2)
Total		500	(225)

International career
2004–2006	Republic of Ireland	2	(0)
2011	League of Ireland XI	1	(0)
- * Club domestic league appearances and goals

Jason Byrne (born 23 February 1978) is an Irish retired footballer who played as a forward. He is the second highest ever goal scorer in the history of the League of Ireland.

== Club career ==
=== Bray Wanderers ===
Byrne scored in his first competitive game for Bray Wanderers coming on as a substitute in a League of Ireland Cup game on 16 August 1998. He made his League of Ireland debut on the opening day of the 1998–99 League of Ireland Premier Division season on 30 August. Byrne scored his first league goal against Shamrock Rovers on 4 September 1998. His exploits earned him the Player of the Month award for his first month in senior football. That season, he scored 7 goals from 15 appearances.

Over the next four seasons, Byrne increased his reputation as a striker that struck fear into the heart of opposition defences, scoring 49 league goals in 128 league appearances. Despite breaking his ankle in November 1998, he recovered to score twice in the 1999 FAI Cup replay win. The 2001–02 season at Bray saw his most successful goals return, netting 14 league goals during the course of the season.

=== Shelbourne ===
On 12 January 2003, he signed for Shelbourne for a reported €75,000, scoring twice on his league debut against Waterford United in April. He made an immediate impact, scoring 21 league goals in his first season, and helping Shelbourne to the summit of the league table. He was named PFAI Player of the Year for his efforts.

2004 saw him pick up where he left off, forging a good partnership with new signing Glen Fitzpatrick, and firing home 25 times in 33 league games, again helping Shelbourne to the league title.

2005 saw him hit 30 goals across all competitions, including 5 in the Champions League qualifiers and 22 in the league, and once again scoop the PFAI Player of the Year Award. During this time he courted the attention of foreign clubs, such as Brighton & Hove Albion and the Swedish champions Djurgårdens IF. It was widely assumed he would join Djurgården, however, the clubs could not agree a fee. The Swedes offered in the region of €400,000, a record for a League of Ireland player. This was turned down because, reportedly, as much as 50% would have gone to his previous club, Bray Wanderers.

Byrne was a key player for Shels in the title winning 2006 season, topping the scoring charts again with 15 goals in 26 league appearances, including a crucial last-minute winner against Derry City. This brought his tally of goals to 83 in 122 league appearances for the Reds.

In the 2006 UEFA Intertoto Cup he missed a penalty at Odense BK and was yellow carded which meant he missed the return leg. Byrne scored his 100th goal for Shelbourne in a League of Ireland Cup game against Finn Harps during the 2006 season.

=== Cardiff City ===
Following the break-up of the Shelbourne team due to tax irregularities, which saw the club demoted to the League of Ireland First Division, Byrne signed for Cardiff City for a fee of £75,000 on 17 January 2007, and scored on his debut against Wolverhampton Wanderers, after coming on as a 62nd-minute substitute. He made several appearances for Cardiff, alongside Michael Chopra, toward the end of the season as their promotion push stalled and they found themselves struggling to maintain form. During the summer it was widely reported that Cardiff had cancelled his contract, even being confirmed by Sky Sports that he had left the club, however this was soon revealed to be false. At the start of the 2007–08 season he found his first team chances to be limited due to the arrivals of Robbie Fowler, Jimmy Floyd Hasselbaink and Steve MacLean and found himself in the reserve side, where he was the leading scorer by January.

=== Bohemians ===
After being linked with the move for some time, he rejoined his former manager Pat Fenlon and signed for Bohemians on 8 January 2008 on a free transfer, signing a three-year deal. Byrne made his debut for Bohs as a substitute against St Patrick's Athletic on 14 March 2008, and scored his first goal for the club from the penalty spot against Finn Harps on 28 March 2008. He scored twice in two wins over Rhyl F.C. in the 2008 UEFA Intertoto Cup. Byrne wrote himself into Bohemian folklore by scoring the goals that clinched the 2008 title against Drogheda United on 10 October.

On his first start of the 2009 season, Byrne netted a brace as Bohs beat arch-rivals Shamrock Rovers 2–0 on 20 March. He continued this good form throughout the season as Bohs won their second league title in a row, with Byrne netting 22 times in the league. This included an incredible 4 goals against Dundalk on 1 May. Byrne had an injury-hit 2010 campaign as he struggled for fitness and form. Despite a good run towards the end of the season where he scored an important winner against big rivals Shamrock Rovers, Byrne and Bohs just came up short losing the league title on goal difference. Due to the Gypsies' financial difficulties, he was released from the club when his contract expired at the culmination of the 2010 season.

=== Dundalk ===
On 4 December 2010, Byrne signed for Dundalk along with fellow Bohemians teammate Mark Quigley on a one-year deal.

=== Return to Bray Wanderers ===
On 24 January 2012, Byrne rejoined Bray Wanderers on a one-year deal. He returned to the club where he began his career, after a nine-year absence. On 30 March, he equalled Pat Morley's record of 182 League of Ireland goals. On 13 April, Byrne became the second highest goalscorer in the history of the League. For his exploits in May 2012 he was awarded the Airtricity/SWAI Player of the Month.

On 8 June 2013, Byrne scored four goals at UCD to become the second player to score more than 200 League of Ireland goals. He also became Bray's leading all-time league goalscorer.

=== Later career ===
On 6 January 2014, Byrne rejoined Bohemians. Limited game time in the 2015 season saw Byrne drop a division to join First Division side UCD in 2016. After signing for UCD, and having amassed a total of 217 league goals, he stated his aim was to break the League of Ireland goalscoring record. He spent one year at the club. In January 2017, Byrne joined First Division side Cabinteely. On the final day of the season, coming on as a substitute, he scored a consolation goal in the 90th minute against Shelbourne to make it 3–1.

He departed Cabinteely at the end of the 2017 season to bring to an end his professional career. Byrne finished his League of Ireland career with a total of 222 league goals scored, making him the second highest all-time goal scorer in the league's history, 13 goals behind Brendan Bradley's record of 235.

== International career ==
Byrne's form won him a call up to the Ireland team for a friendly against Poland on 28 April 2004. Manager Brian Kerr opted only to bring him on for the final few seconds of the goalless away draw.

Byrne was called up to the Ireland squad to face Chile on 24 May 2006 by Kerr's successor, Steve Staunton. Ireland lost 1–0 at home, with Byrne a late substitute and setting up chances for Damien Duff and cousin Robbie Keane.

== Personal life ==
Byrne is married with three children. He is the first cousin of all time Ireland leading goalscorer Robbie Keane.

== Honours ==
Bray Wanderers

- FAI Cup: 1999

Shelbourne

- League of Ireland Premier Division: 2003, 2004, 2006

Bohemians

- League of Ireland Premier Division: 2008, 2009
- FAI Cup: 2008
- League of Ireland Cup: 2009
- Setanta Sports Cup: 2009–10

Individual

- PFAI Players' Player of the Year: 2003, 2004
- League of Ireland Premier Division Top Scorer (4): 2003, 2004, 2005, 2006
- League of Ireland Premier Division Player of the Month (5): September 1998, April 2004, October 2005, May 2012, June 2013
