= Glen Fitzpatrick =

Irish former football player

Personal information
- Date of birth: 26 January 1981 (age 45)
- Place of birth: Dublin, Ireland
- Position: Striker

Team information
- Current team: Broadford Rovers

Senior career*
Years	Team	Apps	(Gls)
1998–2001	UCD	36	(4)
2001–2002	Athlone Town	23	(2)
2002–2003	Glenavon	6	(3)
2003	Shamrock Rovers	26	(8)
2004–2005	Shelbourne	44	(9)
2006–2007	Drogheda United	31	(3)
2007–2009	St Patrick's Athletic	48	(2)
2010	Drogheda United	25	(4)
Total		239	(35)
- * Club domestic league appearances and goals

Glen Fitzpatrick (born 26 January 1981) is an Irish former football player who is the current Director of Football at Broadford Rovers in the Leinster Senior League (association football).

== Career ==
A former youth international he made his League of Ireland debut for UCD against Shamrock Rovers on 16 October 1998.

Before he joined Pats he played for Broadford Rovers, Cherry Orchard, UCD, Athlone Town, Glenavon, Shamrock Rovers, Shelbourne and Drogheda United. He scored on his Glenavon debut in February 2003.

While at Rovers he scored in European competition when Odra Wodzislaw were beaten in the UEFA Intertoto Cup in June 2003 In total he represented Rovers 4 times in Europe.

While with Shelbourne he scored in the UEFA Champions League qualifiers and the Uefa Cup first round in 2004. His most famous game being when introduced as a substitute and scoring 2 goals to earn a late 2-2 come from behind draw against Lille of France at Lansdowne Road.

Fitzpatrick signed for St. Patrick's Athletic in July 2007. He collapsed in a pre match warm up in April 2009.

He signed again for Drogheda United in January 2010.
