= Longford Town F.C. =

Football club in Longford, Ireland

Longford Town
- Full name: Longford Town Football Club
- Nickname: De Town
- Short name: Town
- Founded: 1924; 102 years ago
- Ground: Strokestown Road
- Capacity: 5,097
- Chairman: Jim Hanley
- Manager: Wayne Groves
- League: League of Ireland First Division
- 2026: League of Ireland First Division, 5th of 10
- Website: www.ltfc.ie
Home colours	Away colours

Longford Town Football Club is an Irish professional football club based in Longford, County Longford. The club, which was founded in 1924 and elected to the league in 1984, plays in the League of Ireland First Division.

The club plays its home matches at Strokestown Road, which for sponsorship reasons is also known as Bishopsgate. The club, whose colours are red and black, sometimes goes by the nickname 'De Town'. Its crest contains a silhouette of St Mel's Cathedral in Longford.

Longford Town had a number of successes in domestic competitions, including winning the League of Ireland First Division (in 2014), FAI Cup (in 2003 and 2004) and League of Ireland Cup (in 2004).

== History ==
Following a number of meetings held earlier in the year, Longford Town Football Club was formally founded in October 1924 at a meeting held at the pavilion in Longford Park. It was decided that the club colours were to be similar to those of the Dublin club, Bohemians, 'Red and Black'.

Longford Town had £24 in the kitty to start off and their first big success was winning the Leinster Junior Cup in the 1930–31 season when they beat St. Malachy's of Dundalk at Longford Park. After the game, the Foresters Brass and Reed Band and Longford Pipe and Drum Band led the victory parade through the streets of the town. The Longford team included Tom O’Beirne, Packy Shine, Mel Deane, Jimmy Malynn, John Dennigan, Jimmy and Billy Clarke, Freddy Dykes and Jimmy Breslin. In the 1935–36 season, the Town were promoted to Division 1 of the Leinster Senior League. The following season saw the Town clinch the FAI Intermediate Cup which was a considerable achievement coming so soon after promotion from the Junior ranks. Further Intermediate Cup successes, as well as Metropolitan Cup wins, followed in the 1950s and 1960s.

Then a non-league side, Longford Town reached the final of the Leinster Senior Cup in 1954. They lost the final, played at Dalymount Park on St. Stephen's Day (26 December 1954), 2–1 to Shamrock Rovers.

A number of Longford players received International or inter-league honours over the years. Mel Deane was the first, when he was capped against Scotland in a Junior International. Then followed Junior International honours versus England for Jimmy and Paddy Clarke, as well as Youth International caps for Ignatius Branigan (against Holland) and Teffia Park's Mark Devlin.

Chart of yearly table positions for Longford Town in League of Ireland

The club was 60 years in existence before its election to the League of Ireland in 1984. In their first season in the league they finished last in the Premier Division and were one of the four sides to be relegated to the newly created First Division for the following season. In their second season, they finished bottom of the First Division with only 7 points. Town finished in the bottom six of the ten-team First Division in each of the next eleven seasons.

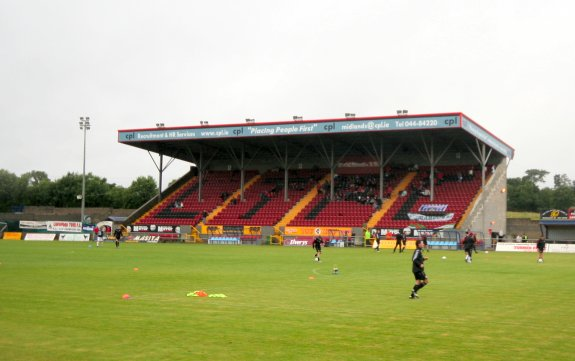
Previously based at Abbeycartron, the club moved to its ground at Strokestown Road in the 1990s

The appointment of the then 26-year-old rookie manager Stephen Kenny in the summer of 1998 proved the catalyst for a major upturn in the club's fortunes on the pitch. In the 1998/99 season, they missed out a place in the promotion/relegation play-off by just four points. The following season saw further improvement when the club finished in second place and, as a result, won promotion to the Premier Division. This was secured on the final day of the season, 22 April 2000, with a 2–0 victory away to Cobh Ramblers. The starting XI was: Stephen O'Brien, Enda Kenny, Wes Byrne (captain), Paul McNally, Stephen Kelly, Paul Perth, Vinny Perth, Stephen Gavin, Shay Zellor, Keith O'Connor and Richie Parsons.

Longford performed admirably in their first season back in the Premier Division finishing in mid-table. That season also saw the club reach the FAI Cup Final for the first time, where they lost 1–0 to Bohemians. As Bohemians had also won the league title that season, Longford qualified to play in the UEFA Cup in July 2001. A meeting over two games with Bulgarian club side PFC Litex Lovech ended in a 3–1 aggregate victory for the Bulgarians.

Things were less comfortable in the league during the 2001/02 season after that, as they ended up in the relegation/promotion play-off, where they played Finn Harps in a two-legged affair. Longford won in a penalty shootout after the tie ended 3–3 on aggregate. After the 2002/03 season, the club became an established top division side, led by manager Alan Mathews, with four successive top-six finishes.

In October 2003, the Town clinched their first title in senior football when winning the FAI Cup following a 2–0 victory over St. Patrick's Athletic at Lansdowne Road. The winning Longford side Stephen O'Brien, Alan Murphy, Barry Ferguson (captain), Brian McGovern, Seán Dillon, Alan Kirby, Vinny Perth, Philip Keogh, Sean Prunty, Shane Barrett and Sean Francis – with Barrett and Francis as goal-scorers. The victory "[made] up for their eircom League Cup final defeat", against the same opposition, earlier in the 2003 season.

2004 would prove to be the most successful year in the club's history. The Town produced a cup double by first winning the League Cup with a 2–1 victory over Bohemians, in a final held in Longford, with the crucial second goal scored by local player Seán Prunty. The FAI Cup was retained following a dramatic 2–1 win over Waterford United at Lansdowne Road in the final on 24 October 2004. Trailing with five minutes to go, late goals by Waterford-born Alan Kirby and sub Paul Keegan meant a "sensational finish" for Longford Town. The starting XI was: Stephen O'Brien (captain), Alan Murphy, Graham Gartland, Seán Dillon, Sean Prunty, Dean Fitzgerald, John Martin, Alan Kirby, Shane Barrett, Dessie Baker and Eric Lavine.

The FAI Cup successes saw the club enter the UEFA Cup in both 2004 and 2005. On both occasions, however, they lost in the first qualifying round on aggregate.

The 2007 season was a disappointing one for the club as, along with losing the FAI Cup final to Cork City, the team were relegated after finishing bottom of the Premier Division. That does not tell the whole story however, as Longford were deducted six league points during the season for failing to comply with club licensing procedures. These six points proved crucial in the end as, without this deduction, they would have finished safe from relegation and the relegation play-off.

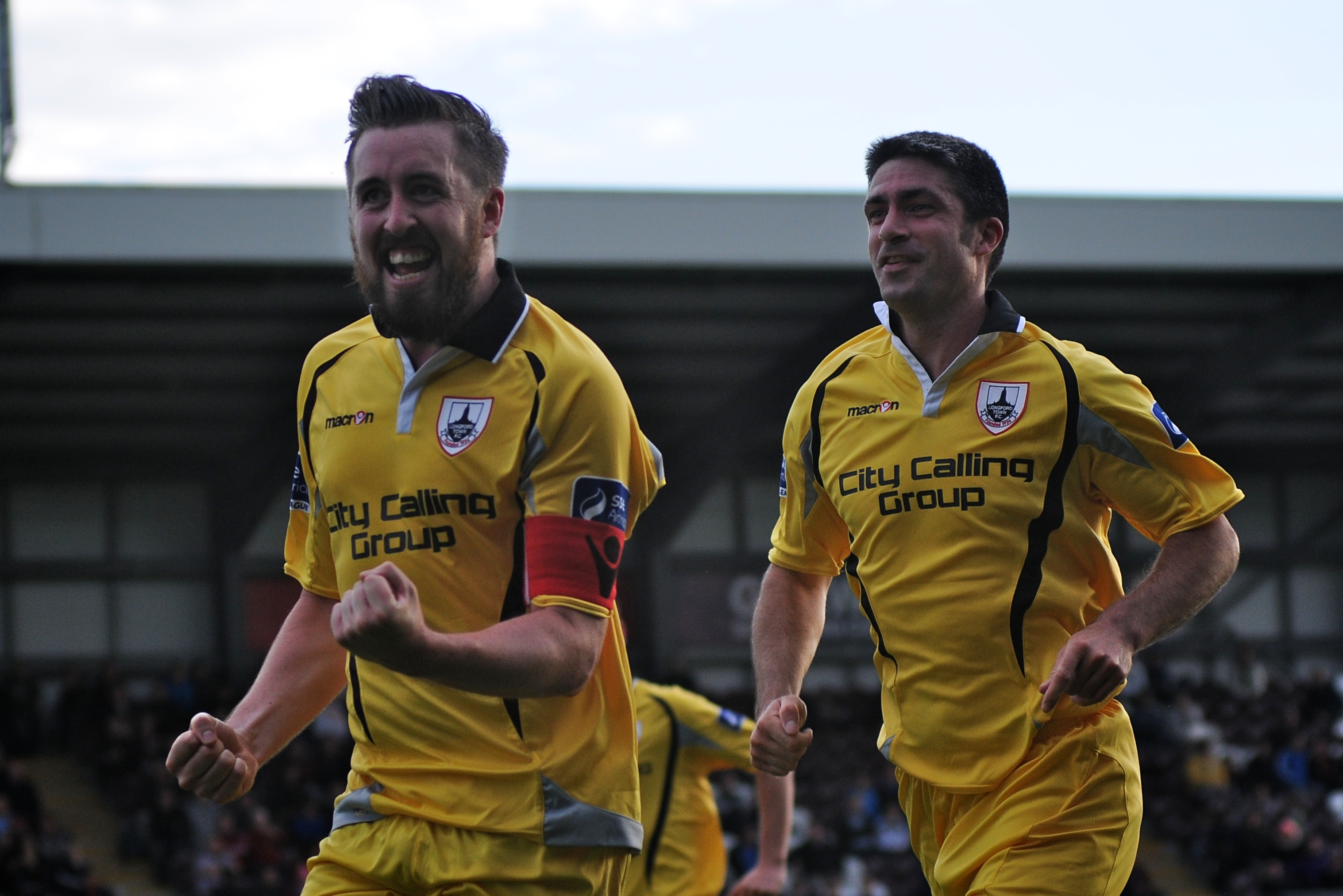
Mark Salmon celebrates an away goal, against Galway FC, in a 2014 League of Ireland First Division game

This cost the club dearly, as there followed six years in the First Division, before being promoted as champions at the end of the 2014 season. The title was clinched, under the management of Tony Cousins, following a resounding 5–0 victory at home to Shamrock Rovers B on 3 October 2014. This league title triumph was the club's first-ever in senior football with the trophy presented to club captain Mark Salmon. The goals of David O'Sullivan and Gary Shaw, along with the contributions of Pat Sullivan, Pat Flynn, Stephen Rice and Kevin O'Connor, were key to the season's success.

In their first season back in the Premier Division, the club finished off the 2015 season in 6th position. However, Longford finished bottom of the 2016 Premier Division table and were relegated back to the First Division.

The 2020 League of Ireland First Division season was suspended after a few weeks due to the COVID-19 pandemic. Longford had played, and won, their two opening league matches before the suspension in March. It wasn't until 31 July, after a break of almost five months, that matches resumed. Finishing the league season in fourth place saw the side enter the promotion play-off series. Victories over UCD and Galway United set up a final appearance against Shelbourne on 15 November 2020. A Rob Manley goal earned a 1–0 win for the Town to secure promotion back to the Premier Division for 2021. The 2021 season was a difficult one for the club, with the side bottom of the table for most of the year and relegated with several matches remaining.

In 2024, the club celebrated its 100th year in existence. To mark the milestone, a Longford Town legends game against Manchester United legends took place on 15 June 2024; it finished 3-3.

== European record ==
Last update: July 2005

=== Overview ===
Competition	P	W	D	L	GF	GA
UEFA Cup	6	1	1	4	6	12
TOTAL	6	1	1	4	6	12

=== Matches ===
Season	Competition	Round	Opponent	Home	Away	Aggregate
2001–02	UEFA Cup	1QR	(Bulgaria) Litex Lovech	1–1	0–2	1–3
2004–05	UEFA Cup	1QR	(Liechtenstein) Vaduz	2–3	0–1	2–4
2005–06	UEFA Cup	1QR	(Wales) Carmarthen Town	2–0	1–5	3–5

== Current squad ==
As of 1 November 2026

Note: Flags indicate national team as defined under FIFA eligibility rules; some limited exceptions apply. Players may hold more than one non-FIFA nationality.

No.	Pos.	Nation	Player
1	GK	IRL	Kian Moore
4	MF	IRL	Daniel McKenna
6	MF	NGR	Sultan Adenekan
7	FW	IRL	Dean George
8	MF	IRL	Pharrell Manuel
9	FW	IRL	Stefan Ugbesia
10	MF	IRL	Aaron Doran
11	MF	IRL	Matthew Harris
12	DF	IRL	Cole Omorehiomwan
14	FW	IRL	Dean Williams
15	FW	IRL	Daragh Murtagh
17	MF	IRL	Mark Canavan

No.	Pos.	Nation	Player
18	DF	IRL	Osaze Irhue
19	FW	IRL	Fran Campbell
20	MF	IRL	Alex O'Brien
21	DF	IRL	Jake Hough
22	DF	IRL	Conor Errity
23	MF	IRL	Andy Paraschiv
24	MF	IRL	Ronan Dawson
25	GK	IRL	Liam Woodcock
26	DF	IRL	Jamie Egan
27	MF	IRL	Kian Brunton
28	MF	IRL	Sean Moore

== Technical staff ==
Position	Staff
Manager	Wayne Groves
Coach	Kevin Beggy
Coach	John O'Sullivan
Goalkeeping coach	David Gallagher

== Honours ==
- FAI Cup: 2
  - 2003, 2004
- League of Ireland Cup: 1
  - 2004
- League of Ireland First Division: 1
  - 2014
- FAI Intermediate Cup: 5
  - 1936–37, 1954–55, 1959–60, 1961–62, 1968–69
- Connacht Junior Cup 1
  - 1931–32
- Enda McGuill Cup: 1
  - 2002–03 (under-21s)

== Records ==
- League victory: 7–1 v Athlone Town, 19 August 2017 and 6–0 v Shamrock Rovers B, 30 May 2014
- League defeat: 1–8 v Waterford United, 12 November 1989
- Points in a season: 70, 1999–2000 (36 games)
- League goals in a season (player): 24, David O'Sullivan, 2013-2014
- League goals: 60, David O'Sullivan, 2013–2016
- League appearances: 250, Stephen O'Brien, 1998–2005

== Former managers (League of Ireland era) ==
- (Republic of Ireland) Charlie Walker (1984–1985)
- (Republic of Ireland) Billy Bagster (1985–1987)
- (Republic of Ireland) Pat 'Zac' Hackett (1987–1990)
- (Republic of Ireland) Ron Langford (1990)
- (Republic of Ireland) Pat 'Zac' Hackett (1990–1991)
- (Republic of Ireland) Con Flanagan (1991–1992)
- (Republic of Ireland) Dermot Keely (1992–1993)
- (Republic of Ireland) Liam Brien (1994)
- (Republic of Ireland) John Cleary (1994–1996)
- (Republic of Ireland) Michael O'Connor (1996–1998)
- (Republic of Ireland) Stephen Kenny (1998–2001)
- (Republic of Ireland) Martin Lawlor (2001–2002)
- (Republic of Ireland) Alan Mathews (2002–2007)
- (Republic of Ireland) Aaron Callaghan (2007–2008)
- (England) Alan Gough (2008–2009)
- (Republic of Ireland) Gareth Cronin (2009)
- (Republic of Ireland) Tony Cousins (2009–2016)
- (Republic of Ireland) Alan Mathews (2016–2017)
- (Republic of Ireland) Neale Fenn (2017–2019)
- (Republic of Ireland) Daire Doyle (2019–2021)
- (Republic of Ireland) Gary Cronin (2021–2022)
- (Republic of Ireland) Stephen Henderson (2022–2024)

== Supporters Player of the Year ==
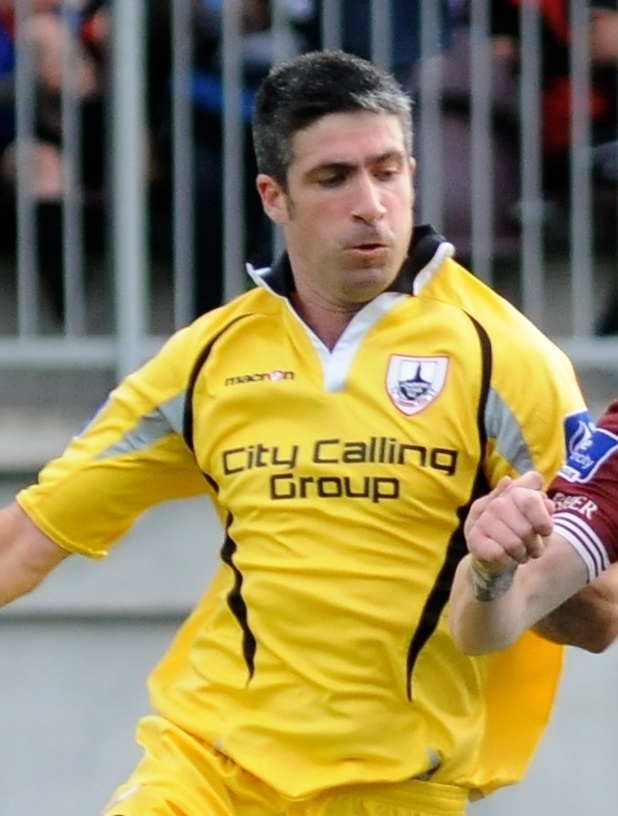
Kevin O'Connor, pictured in 2014, was voted "player of the year" in 2015

Season	Winner
2025	(Republic of Ireland) Aaron Doran
2024	(Republic of Ireland) Dean O'Shea
2021	(Republic of Ireland) Aaron O'Driscoll
2020	(Republic of Ireland) Aodh Dervin
2019	(Republic of Ireland) Lee Steacy
2018	(Republic of Ireland) Dylan McGlade
2017	(Republic of Ireland) Daniel O'Reilly
2015	(Republic of Ireland) Kevin O'Connor
2014	(Republic of Ireland) Gary Shaw
2013	(Republic of Ireland) David O'Sullivan
2012	(Northern Ireland) Keith Gillespie
2011	(Republic of Ireland) Mark Salmon
2010	(Republic of Ireland) Michael Lee
2009	(Republic of Ireland) Tom King
2007	(Republic of Ireland) Dave Mooney
