= Kevin McHugh =

Irish footballer and manager

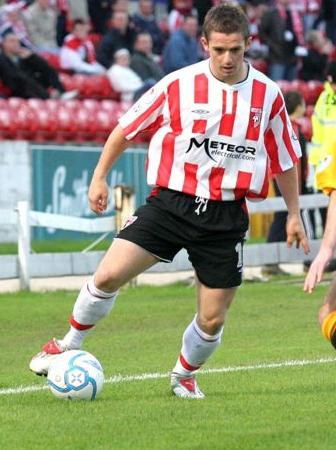
- McHugh playing for Derry City during the 2006 League of Ireland Premier Division season

Personal information
- Full name: Kevin McHugh
- Date of birth: 19 January 1980 (age 46)
- Place of birth: Letterkenny, Ireland
- Position: Forward

Senior career*
Years	Team	Apps	(Gls)
1998–2005	Finn Harps	184	(106)
2000	→ Omagh Town (loan)	8	(3)
2006–2008	Derry City	88	(12)
2009	Linfield	26	(4)
2010–2016	Finn Harps	81	(56)
Total		387	(181)

Managerial career
- 2016: Finn Harps U15
- 2017–2025: Finn Harps (Head of Academy)
- 2024–2025: Finn Harps (assistant)
- 2025–2026: Finn Harps
- * Club domestic league appearances and goals

Kevin McHugh (born 19 January 1980) is an Irish former footballer and manager. Considered one of Donegal's best-known sports stars, McHugh is fifth in the all-time League of Ireland goal-scoring list with 174 league goals.

== Career ==
McHugh was born in Letterkenny and grew up in the border town of Killea in County Donegal.

=== Finn Harps ===
McHugh scored and made his debut for Ballybofey-side, Finn Harps, against Fanad United in the League of Ireland Cup as just a novice 17-year-old in August 1998. He went on to make 184 appearances for the side, building up a reputation as one of the deadliest forwards in the Irish game by scoring 110 league goals. In 2005, the striker became one of just five then-current players to join the 38-strong group of players to have scored 100 or more league goals in the modern era. McHugh scored his 99th and 100th League of Ireland goals at Finn Park on 22 October 2005 as Harps thrashed Longford 5–0.

Despite the relegation of Finn Harps from the League of Ireland Premier Division, McHugh finished third highest scorer in the 2005 season with 13 goals. He attracted the attention of other clubs, including Shelbourne and Bohemians, before the beginning of the 2006 season. Only Brendan Bradley has scored more goals than McHugh for Finn Harps. In his first spell at the club, the Killea man scored 122 goals in 248 games for Harps and was top scorer for the club in six successive seasons from 2000/01 until he left Finn Park in 2005. He was top scorer in the First Division three times in a row with Harps.

=== Linfield ===
McHugh signed a two-and-a-half-year contract with Linfield in January 2009. Kevin scored his first Linfield goal on his first start with a last gasp winner at home to Institute. He had a setback at the start of the next season, with a serious hamstring injury. This left him sidelined for over 4 months, never recovered and left and returned to Finn Park for their preseason.

=== Return to Finn Harps ===
McHugh signed back for Harps in February 2010

In his first three seasons back with the Ballybofey club he has scored 36 goals, 12 in his first season, 11 in his second and 13 goals in 2012 making him ninth in the all-time League of Ireland goalscoring list with 154 league goals.

His testimonial was contested by a Donegal GAA select and a Finn Harps select at Finn Park, with one half Gaelic football and the other half soccer.

In October 2016, McHugh suffered a freak injury while hosting an under-age coaching session in Donegal. When he was jumping over a gate to get a set of goalposts, his wedding ring got caught in the fence and he severed a finger. The finger was too badly damaged to be repaired and the injury ended his football career.

=== Kildrum Tigers ===
McHugh has also played for Kildrum Tigers.

== Managerial career ==
=== Finn Harps ===
McHugh joined the academy setup in Finn Harps soon after his retirement from playing professional football. In November 2016, McHugh was named as the manager of the Finn Harps under-15 team for the inaugural League of Ireland under-15 season.

In 2017, McHugh was named Head of Finn Harps Academy.

In 2024, following a disastrous season for the Harps first team on the pitch, the club appointed Darren Murphy as manager with McHugh joining Murphy as assistant manager for the 2024 season. The season came close to a play-off spot with Harps finishing 6th place in the First Division. Murphy departed the club in 2025 to take up a managerial role at Loughall with McHugh taking on an interim managerial role.

On 2 April 2025, McHugh was appointed first-team manager of Finn Harps. On 26 July 2026, McHugh stepped down as manager as part of the club's move to full-time football, while it was also confirmed that he would remain with the club in a different role.

== Managerial Statistics ==
As of match played on 24 July 2026

Managerial record by team and tenure
Team	From	To	Record							
Team	From	To	G	W	D	L	GF	GA	GD	Win %
Finn Harps	2 April 2025	26 July 2026	57	13	18	26	60	93	−33	22.81
Total			57	13	18	26	60	93	−33	22.81

== Honours ==
Individual

- League of Ireland First Division Player of the Year
  - 2002, 2004
- League of Ireland First Division Top Scorer
  - 2001–02, 2002–03, 2004, 2012

Finn Harps

- League of Ireland First Division
  - 2004

Derry City

- FAI Cup
  - 2006
- League of Ireland Cup
  - 2006, 2007, 2008
