= 2004 League of Ireland Cup =

Tournament details
- Country: Republic of Ireland
- Dates: 3 May – 30 August 2004

Final positions
- Champions: Longford Town
- Runners-up: Bohemians
- Semifinalists: Finn Harps; Limerick

Tournament statistics
- Matches played: 31
- Goals scored: 86 (2.77 per match)

The League of Ireland Cup 2004 was the 31st staging of the League of Ireland Cup, which was won by Longford Town, the club's first victory in the competition.

The 2004 League Cup kicked off in May. It featured two teams representing the Kerry and Mayo Leagues plus the 10 teams from the Premier Division and the 12 from the First Division. There was 24 teams drawn into eight groups of three. Each team played the other two in their group. The winner of each group progressed to the quarter-finals.

== Group stage ==
Matches played between 3 May and 18 May 2004.

=== Group 1 ===
Pos	Team	Pld	W	D	L	GF	GA	GD	Pts	Qualification
1	Cork City	2	2	0	0	6	1	+5	6	Advanced to quarter-finals
2	Cobh Ramblers	2	0	1	1	1	2	−1	1	
3	Kerry League	2	0	1	1	0	4	−4	1	

May 3, 2004
Cork City	4–0	Kerry League	Turners Cross
May 11, 2004
Cobh Ramblers	1–2	Cork City	St. Colman's Park
May 18, 2004
Kerry League	0–0	Cobh Ramblers	Mount Hawk Park

=== Group 2 ===
Pos	Team	Pld	W	D	L	GF	GA	GD	Pts	Qualification
1	Limerick	2	0	2	0	4	4	0	2	Advanced to quarter-finals
2	Kilkenny City	2	0	2	0	2	2	0	2	
3	Waterford United	2	0	2	0	2	2	0	2	

May 4, 2004
Waterford United	0–0	Kilkenny City	Regional Sports Centre
May 11, 2004
Limerick	2–2	Waterford United	Hogan Park
May 18, 2004
Kilkenny City	2–2	Limerick	Buckley Park

=== Group 3 ===
Pos	Team	Pld	W	D	L	GF	GA	GD	Pts	Qualification
1	Longford Town	2	2	0	0	6	1	+5	6	Advanced to quarter-finals
2	Kildare County	2	1	0	1	5	2	+3	3	
3	Athlone Town	2	0	0	2	0	8	−8	0	

May 3, 2004
Kildare County	4–0	Athlone Town	Station Road
May 11, 2004
Longford Town	2–1	Kildare County	Flancare Park
May 18, 2004
Athlone Town	0–4	Longford Town	St. Mel's Park

=== Group 4 ===
Pos	Team	Pld	W	D	L	GF	GA	GD	Pts	Qualification
1	Finn Harps	2	1	0	1	3	2	+1	3	Advanced to quarter-finals
2	Derry City	2	1	0	1	2	1	+1	3	
3	Monaghan United	2	1	0	1	1	3	−2	3	

May 4, 2004
Derry City	2–0	Finn Harps	The Brandywell
May 11, 2004
Monaghan United	1–0	Derry City	Finn Park
May 18, 2004
Finn Harps	3–0	Monaghan United	Kingspan Century Park

=== Group 5 ===
Pos	Team	Pld	W	D	L	GF	GA	GD	Pts	Qualification
1	Sligo Rovers	2	1	1	0	2	0	+2	4	Advanced to quarter-finals
2	Galway United	2	0	2	0	1	1	0	2	
3	Mayo League	2	0	1	1	1	3	−2	1	

May 3, 2004
Galway United	0–0	Sligo Rovers	Terryland Park
May 11, 2004
Mayo League	1–1	Galway United
May 18, 2004
Sligo Rovers	2–0	Mayo League	The Showgrounds

=== Group 6 ===
Pos	Team	Pld	W	D	L	GF	GA	GD	Pts	Qualification
1	UCD	2	1	1	0	1	0	+1	4	Advanced to quarter-finals
2	Bray Wanderers	2	1	0	1	3	2	+1	3	
3	Shamrock Rovers	2	0	1	1	1	3	−2	1	

May 4, 2004
Bray Wanderers	0–1	UCD	Carlisle Grounds
May 10, 2004
Shamrock Rovers	1–3	Bray Wanderers	Richmond Park
May 17, 2004
UCD	0–0	Shamrock Rovers	Belfield Park

=== Group 7 ===
Pos	Team	Pld	W	D	L	GF	GA	GD	Pts	Qualification
1	Dublin City	2	2	0	0	5	2	+3	6	Advanced to quarter-finals
2	Shelbourne	2	1	0	1	4	4	0	3	
3	St Patrick's Athletic	2	0	0	2	3	6	−3	0	

May 3, 2004
St Patrick's Athletic	1–3	Dublin City	Richmond Park
May 11, 2004
Shelbourne	3–2	St Patrick's Athletic	Tolka Park
May 17, 2004
Dublin City	2–1	Shelbourne	Tolka Park

=== Group 8 ===
Pos	Team	Pld	W	D	L	GF	GA	GD	Pts	Qualification
1	Bohemians	2	1	1	0	3	1	+2	4	Advanced to quarter-finals
2	Drogheda United	2	1	0	1	5	4	+1	3	
3	Dundalk	2	0	1	1	1	4	−3	1	

May 4, 2004
Dundalk	0–0	Bohemians	Oriel Park
May 10, 2004
Drogheda United	4–1	Dundalk	United Park
May 17, 2004
Bohemians	3–1	Drogheda United	Dalymount Park

== Quarter-finals ==
Matches played between 14 June and 28 June 2004.

Tie no	Home team	Score	Away team
1	Limerick	2–0	Cork City
2	Sligo Rovers	1–5	Finn Harps
3	Longford Town	2–0	Dublin City
4	Bohemians	2–1	UCD

== Semi-finals ==
2004-07-06
19:45

Bohemians	4–1	Limerick
Ward 50', 70'; Crowe 60'; Lynch 90'		Hartnett 9'

Dalymount Park, Dublin

2004-07-20
19:45

Finn Harps	1–2	Longford Town
McHugh 57'		Francis 18'; Baker 55'

Finn Park, Ballybofey

== Final ==
2004-08-30
19:45

Bohemians	1–2	Longford Town
Ryan 85' (pen.)		Dillon 4'; Prunty 81'

Flancare Park, Longford

League of Ireland Cup Winner 2004

1st title
