= 2001–02 Shelbourne F.C. season =

Shelbourne
2001–02 season
- Chairman: Ollie Byrne
- Manager: Dermot Keely
- Premier Division: 1st
- UEFA Cup: Qualifying Round
- FAI Cup: Third Round
- League Cup: First Round
- Top goalscorer: League: Stephen Geoghegan (9); All: Stephen Geoghegan (9)
Home colours	Away colours

In the 2001–02 season, Shelbourne were crowned eircom League Premier Division champions.

== Managerial/backroom staff ==
Manager: Dermot Keely
Caretaker Managers: Noel King, Alan Mathews (November 2001 to February 2002)
Assistant Manager: Alan Mathews

== 2001–02 squad members ==
Note: Flags indicate national team as defined under FIFA eligibility rules; some limited exceptions apply. Players may hold more than one non-FIFA nationality.

No.	Pos.	Nation	Player
—	GK	WAL	Steve Williams
—	GK	ENG	Gareth Downey
—	GK	AUS	Brad Jones (was on loan from Middlesbrough)
—	DF	IRL	Owen Heary (Captain)
—	DF	IRL	Jim Gannon
—	DF	IRL	Kevin Doherty
—	DF	IRL	Barry Prenderville
—	DF	IRL	Tony McCarthy
—	DF	NIR	Peter Hutton
—	DF	IRL	Alan Keely
—	DF	IRL	Philip Byrne
—	DF	IRL	Jonathan Minnock
—	DF	ENG	Glen Downey
—	MF	IRL	Richie Baker
—	MF	IRL	Brian Byrne
—	MF	IRL	Jim Crawford

No.	Pos.	Nation	Player
—	MF	IRL	Davy Byrne
—	MF	IRL	Pat Fenlon
—	MF	IRL	Wes Hoolahan
—	MF	IRL	John Burns (was on loan from Bristol City)
—	MF	IRL	Mark Dempsey
—	MF	IRL	Michael McCann
—	MF	IRL	Ger Crossley
—	MF	IRL	Gareth Murphy
—	FW	IRL	Stephen Geoghegan
—	FW	IRL	Dessie Baker
—	FW	SCO	Martin Gritton (was on loan from Plymouth Argyle)
—	FW	IRL	Trevor Fitzpatrick
—	FW	ENG	Garry Haylock
—	FW	IRL	Richie Foran
—	FW	NGR	James Igwilo
—	FW	IRL	Tony Tynan

== Results/league tables ==
=== eircom League Premier Division ===
12 August 2001	Monaghan United	0 – 1	Shelbourne	Century Homes Park, Monaghan
20.00 IST		Report	Garry Haylock 42'; Tony McCarthy (red card) 33'	Referee: Dave McKeon (Meath)

17 August 2001	Shelbourne	1 – 1	St. Patrick's Athletic	Tolka Park, Dublin
19.45 IST	Peter Hutton 54'		Paul Osam 33'	Referee: Paul McKeon (Dublin)

27 August 2001	Dundalk	1 – 1	Shelbourne	Oriel Park, Dundalk
19.45 IST	Ger Robinson 21'		Richie Foran 16'; Richie Foran (red card)	Referee: John McDermott (Dublin)

31 August 2001	Shelbourne	2 – 0	Longford Town	Tolka Park, Dublin
19.45 IST	Stephen Geoghegan 2'; Dessie Baker 53'; Dessie Baker (red card)			Referee: Alan Kelly (Cork)

9 September 2001	Bray Wanderers	0 – 3	Shelbourne	Carlisle Grounds, Bray
15.15 IST		Report	Davy Byrne 25'; Dessie Baker 47' (pen.); Richie Baker 65'	Referee: Hugh Byrne (Dublin)

16 September 2001	Cork City	1 – 0	Shelbourne	Turners Cross, Cork
14.00 IST	Colin P. O'Brien 84'	Report		Referee: John Feighery (Dublin)

18 September 2001	Shelbourne	1 – 1	Derry City	Tolka Park, Dublin
19.45 IST	Owen Heary 70'		Sean Hargan 49'; Liam Coyle (penalty missed) (pen.)	Referee: Paul McKeon (Dublin)

21 September 2001	Shelbourne	3 – 0	Galway United	Tolka Park, Dublin
19.45 IST	Richie Baker 16' 42'; Pat Fenlon 27'

26 September 2001	Shamrock Rovers	3 – 0	Shelbourne	Tolka Park, Dublin
19.45 IST	Pat Deans 35'; Marc Kenny 41' (pen.) 45'		Jim Gannon (red card); Peter Hutton (red card)

30 September 2001	Shelbourne	0 – 1	UCD	Tolka Park, Dublin
19.45 IST		Report	Alan McNally 19'	Referee: Hugh Byrne (Dublin)

5 October 2001	Bohemians	4 – 6	Shelbourne	Dalymount Park, Dublin
19.45 IST	Glen Crowe 34' 67'; Dave Morrison 44'; Gary O'Neill 52'	Report	Pat Fenlon 9'; Richie Baker 10'; Stephen Geoghegan 12'; Jim Gannon 35'; Davy Byrne 68'; Jim Crawford 90+3'	Referee: John Feighery (Dublin)

12 October 2001	Shelbourne	3 – 1	Monaghan United	Tolka Park, Dublin
19.45 IST	Dessie Baker 13'; Stephen Geoghegan 31' 58'; Jonathan Minnock (red card) 77'	Report	Ken Lundy 72'	Referee: Hugo Whoriskey (Meath)

19 October 2001	St. Patrick's Athletic	3 – 2	Shelbourne	Richmond Park, Dublin
19.45 IST	Martin Russell 26'; Paul Marney 43'; Charles Livingstone Mbabazi 81'		Stephen Geoghegan 3'; Davy Byrne 15'	Referee: Paul McKeon (Dublin)

26 October 2001	Shelbourne	4 – 0	Dundalk	Tolka Park, Dublin
19.45 IST	Stephen Geoghegan 10'; Jim Crawford 40'; Jim Gannon 63'; Davy Byrne 67'		Liam Dunne (red card)	Referee: John Stacey (Athlone)

3 November 2001	Longford Town	1 – 0	Shelbourne	Flancare Park, Longford
19.30 GMT	Eric Lavine 30'			Referee: Dave McKeon (Meath)

8 November 2001	Shelbourne	2 – 0	Bray Wanderers	Tolka Park, Dublin
19.45 GMT	Jim Crawford 45'; Jim Gannon 82'	Report		Referee: John McDermott (Dublin)

16 November 2001	Shelbourne	2 – 1	Cork City	Tolka Park, Dublin
19.45 GMT	Pat Fenlon 57'; Wes Hoolahan 80'		Alan Bennett 90+1'	Referee: John Stacey (Athlone)

22 November 2001	Derry City	0 – 0	Shelbourne	Brandywell Stadium, Derry
19.45 GMT		Report		Referee: Hugh Byrne (Dublin)

30 November 2001	Galway United	0 – 1	Shelbourne	Terryland Park, Galway
GMT			Peter Hutton 47'	Referee: Alan Kelly (Cork)

7 December 2001	Shelbourne	2 – 0	Shamrock Rovers	Tolka Park, Dublin
19.45 GMT	Jim Gannon 52'; Jim Crawford 67'			Referee: John McDermott (Dublin)

23 December 2001	UCD	2 – 3	Shelbourne	Belfield Park, Dublin
15.15 GMT	Clive Delaney 42'; Sean Finn 73'	Report	Stephen Geoghegan 16'; Kevin Doherty 77'; Owen Heary 87'	Referee: Hugo Whoriskey (Meath)

28 December 2001	Shelbourne	1 – 0	Bohemians	Tolka Park, Dublin
19.45 GMT	John Burns 50'			Referee: Hugh Byrne (Dublin)

6 January 2002	Monaghan United	1 – 0	Shelbourne	Century Homes Park, Monaghan
15.00 GMT	Derek McGrath 78'			Referee: Eddie Barr (Dublin)

18 January 2002	Shelbourne	2 – 1	St. Patrick's Athletic	Tolka Park, Dublin
19.45 GMT	Stephen Geoghegan 9' (pen.); Jim Crawford 16'		Colm Foley 35'	Referee: John McDermott (Dublin)

27 January 2002	Dundalk	1 – 2	Shelbourne	Oriel Park, Dundalk
14.30 GMT	Donal Broughan 80' (pen.)	Report	Wes Hoolahan 57' 66'; Kevin Doherty (red card) 79'	Referee: John Feighery (Dublin)

1 February 2002	Shelbourne	3 – 0	Longford Town	Tolka Park, Dublin
19.45 GMT	Jim Crawford 21' 49'; Pat Fenlon 78'		Eric Lavine (red card) 7'; Vinny Perth (red card); Stuart Byrne (red card)	Referee: Dick O'Hanlon (Waterford)

17 February 2002	Bray Wanderers	0 – 0	Shelbourne	Carlisle Grounds, Bray
15.15 GMT		Report		Referee: Paul McKeon (Dublin)

24 February 2002	Cork City	0 – 1	Shelbourne	Turners Cross, Cork
14.00 GMT		Report	John Burns 57'	Referee: Hugh Byrne (Dublin)

1 March 2002	Shelbourne	0 – 1	Derry City	Tolka Park, Dublin
19.45 GMT		Report	Tommy McCallion 14'	Referee: John Feighery (Dublin)

8 March 2002	Shelbourne	2 – 0	Galway United	Tolka Park, Dublin
19.45 GMT	Brian Byrne 26'; Stephen Geoghegan 73'			Referee: John Stacey (Athlone)

17 March 2002	Shamrock Rovers	0 – 2	Shelbourne	Richmond Park, Dublin
15.15 GMT			Gareth Cronin 15' (o.g.); Owen Heary 44'	Referee: Paul McKeon (Dublin)

22 March 2002	Shelbourne	0 – 0	UCD	Tolka Park, Dublin
19.45 GMT		Report		Referee: Alan Kelly (Cork)

31 March 2002	Bohemians	4 – 0	Shelbourne	Dalymount Park, Dublin
15.15 IST	Kevin Hunt 30'; Glen Crowe 54' 68'; Fergal Harkin 76'			Referee: John Feighery (Dublin)

==== Final league table ====
Pos	Team	Pld	W	D	L	GF	GA	GD	Pts	Qualification or relegation
1	Shelbourne (C)	33	19	6	8	50	28	+22	63	Qualification to Champions League first qualifying round
2	Shamrock Rovers	33	17	6	10	54	32	+22	57	Qualification to UEFA Cup qualifying round
3	St Patrick's Athletic (Note: St Patrick's Athletic had 15 points deducted for fielding an ineligible player.)	33	20	8	5	59	29	+30	53	Qualification to Intertoto Cup first round
4	Bohemians	33	14	10	9	57	32	+25	52	
5	Derry City	33	14	9	10	42	30	+12	51	

Source: www.rsssf.com
(C) Champions

==== League Results summary ====
Overall								Home						Away					
Pld	W	D	L	GF	GA	GD	Pts	W	D	L	GF	GA	GD	W	D	L	GF	GA	GD
33	19	6	8	50	28	+22	63	11	3	2	28	7	+21	8	3	6	22	21	+1

Last updated: 31 March 2002.
Source: eircom League Premier Division Fixtures

==== League Form/Results by round ====
Round	1	2	3	4	5	6	7	8	9	10	11	12	13	14	15	16	17	18	19	20	21	22	23	24	25	26	27	28	29	30	31	32	33
Ground	A	H	A	H	A	A	H	H	A	H	A	H	A	H	A	H	H	A	A	H	A	H	A	H	A	H	A	A	H	H	A	H	A
Result	W	D	D	W	W	L	D	W	L	L	W	W	L	W	L	W	W	D	W	W	W	W	L	W	W	W	D	W	L	W	W	D	L

Updated to match(es) played on 31 March 2002. Source: eircom League Premier Division Fixtures
A = Away; H = Home; W = Win; D = Draw; L = Loss

=== UEFA Cup ===
==== Qualifying Round ====
9 August 2001	Brøndby IF	2 – 0	Shelbourne	Brøndby Stadium, Copenhagen
19.30 IST	Mattias Jonson 16'; Ruben Bagger 80'	Report	Stephen Geoghegan (red card) 90+1'	Attendance: 8,011; Referee: Sinisa Zrnic (Bosnia and Herzegovina)

23 August 2001	Shelbourne	0 – 3	Brøndby IF	Tolka Park, Dublin
18.45 IST		Report	Ruben Bagger 12'; Mads Jørgensen 54'; Peter Madsen 78'	Attendance: 3,000

Brøndby IF won 5 – 0 on aggregate

=== FAI Cup ===
==== Second round ====
13 December 2001	Workmen's Dunleary	0 – 3	Shelbourne	Carlisle Grounds, Bray
19.45 GMT		Report	Owen Heary 45'; John Burns 71' 81'	Referee: Dave McKeon (Meath)

==== Third round ====
12 January 2002	Finn Harps	2 – 1	Shelbourne	Finn Park, Ballybofey
19.30 GMT	Niall Cooke 55'; Kevin McHugh 73'		Jonathan Minnock 36'	Referee: Paul McKeon (Dublin)

=== League Cup ===
==== First round ====
29 October 2001	Shelbourne	2 – 3	Shamrock Rovers	Tolka Park, Dublin
19.30 GMT	Philip Byrne 17'; Jonathan Minnock 74'		Stephen Grant 13' 22'; Tony Grant 34'

=== FAI Super Cup ===
27 June 2001	Bohemians	1 – 1	Shelbourne	Dalymount Park, Dublin
IST	Brian Shelley 36'		Trevor Fitzpatrick 88'

29 June 2001	Shelbourne	2 – 0	Longford Town	Tolka Park, Dublin
IST	Garry Haylock 9'; Pat Fenlon 55'

1 July 2001	Shelbourne	1 – 1	Cork City	Tolka Park, Dublin
IST	Richie Foran 88'		Anthony Buckley 85'

== 2001–02 Season Statistics ==
=== Player appearances/goals ===
As of March 31, 2002.

No.	Pos	Nat	Player	Total		Premier Division		UEFA Cup		FAI Cup		League Cup	
No.	Pos	Nat	Player	Apps	Goals	Apps	Goals	Apps	Goals	Apps	Goals	Apps	Goals
	FW	(Republic of Ireland) IRL	Dessie Baker	13	3	11	3	1	0	0	0	1	0
	MF	(Republic of Ireland) IRL	Richie Baker	26	4	24	4	2	0	0	0	0	0
	MF	(Republic of Ireland) IRL	Brian Byrne	22	1	18	1	2	0	1	0	1	0
	MF	(Republic of Ireland) IRL	Davy Byrne	29	4	25	4	2	0	2	0	0	0
	DF	(Republic of Ireland) IRL	Philip Byrne	3	1	2	0	0	0	0	0	1	1
	MF	(Republic of Ireland) IRL	John Burns	8	4	6	2	0	0	2	2	0	0
	MF	(Republic of Ireland) IRL	Jim Crawford	30	7	26	7	1	0	2	0	1	0
	MF	(Republic of Ireland) IRL	Ger Crossley	1	0	1	0	0	0	0	0	0	0
	MF	(Republic of Ireland) IRL	Mark Dempsey	3	0	2	0	1	0	0	0	0	0
	DF	(Republic of Ireland) IRL	Kevin Doherty	22	1	19	1	0	0	2	0	1	0
	GK	(England) ENG	Gareth Downey	2	0	2	0	0	0	0	0	0	0
	DF	(England) ENG	Glen Downey	0	0	0	0	0	0	0	0	0	0
	MF	(Republic of Ireland) IRL	Pat Fenlon	35	4	31	4	1	0	2	0	1	0
	FW	(Republic of Ireland) IRL	Richie Foran	3	1	1	1	2	0	0	0	0	0
	FW	(Republic of Ireland) IRL	Trevor Fitzpatrick	10	0	8	0	2	0	0	0	0	0
	DF	(Republic of Ireland) IRL	Jim Gannon	32	4	30	4	1	0	1	0	0	0
	FW	(Republic of Ireland) IRL	Stephen Geoghegan	32	9	29	9	1	0	2	0	0	0
	FW	(Scotland) SCO	Martin Gritton	8	0	6	0	0	0	2	0	0	0
	FW	(England) ENG	Garry Haylock	3	1	2	1	1	0	0	0	0	0
	DF	(Republic of Ireland) IRL	Owen Heary	38	4	33	3	2	0	2	1	1	0
	MF	(Republic of Ireland) IRL	Wes Hoolahan	22	3	20	3	0	0	2	0	0	0
	DF	(Northern Ireland) NIR	Peter Hutton	37	2	32	2	2	0	2	0	1	0
	FW	(Nigeria) NGR	James Igwilo	1	0	1	0	0	0	0	0	0	0
	GK	(Australia) AUS	Brad Jones	2	0	2	0	0	0	0	0	0	0
	DF	(Republic of Ireland) IRL	Alan Keely	1	0	0	0	0	0	0	0	1	0
	MF	(Republic of Ireland) IRL	Michael McCann	2	0	1	0	0	0	0	0	1	0
	DF	(Republic of Ireland) IRL	Tony McCarthy	34	0	30	0	2	0	2	0	0	0
	DF	(Republic of Ireland) IRL	Jonathan Minnock	29	2	24	0	2	0	2	1	1	1
	MF	(Republic of Ireland) IRL	Gareth Murphy	1	0	0	0	0	0	0	0	1	0
	DF	(Republic of Ireland) IRL	Barry Prenderville	8	0	8	0	0	0	0	0	0	0
	FW	(Republic of Ireland) IRL	Tony Tynan	1	0	0	0	0	0	0	0	1	0
	GK	(Wales) WAL	Steve Williams	35	0	30	0	2	0	2	0	1	0

=== Top goalscorers ===
Position	Goalscorer	Total Goals	Premier Division	UEFA Cup	FAI Cup	League Cup
1	(Republic of Ireland) Stephen Geoghegan	9	9	0	0	0
2	(Republic of Ireland) Jim Crawford	7	7	0	0	0
3	(Republic of Ireland) Richie Baker	4	4	0	0	0
3	(Republic of Ireland) Davy Byrne	4	4	0	0	0
3	(Republic of Ireland) John Burns	4	2	0	2	0
3	(Republic of Ireland) Pat Fenlon	4	4	0	0	0
3	(Republic of Ireland) Jim Gannon	4	4	0	0	0
3	(Republic of Ireland) Owen Heary	4	3	0	1	0
9	(Republic of Ireland) Dessie Baker	3	3	0	0	0
9	(Republic of Ireland) Wes Hoolahan	3	3	0	0	0
11	(Republic of Ireland) Peter Hutton	2	2	0	0	0
11	(Republic of Ireland) Jonathan Minnock	2	0	0	1	1
13	(Republic of Ireland) Brian Byrne	1	1	0	0	0
13	(Republic of Ireland) Philip Byrne	1	0	0	0	1
13	(Republic of Ireland) Kevin Doherty	1	1	0	0	0
13	(Republic of Ireland) Richie Foran	1	1	0	0	0
13	(England) Garry Haylock	1	1	0	0	0
