= 2006 League of Ireland First Division =

League of Ireland First Division
- Season: 2006
- Champions: Shamrock Rovers
- Promoted: Galway United
- Top goalscorer: Philip Hughes: 19 (Dundalk)

The 2006 League of Ireland First Division season was the 22nd season of the League of Ireland First Division. The First Division was contested by 10 teams and Shamrock Rovers won the division. Each team played the other teams four times, totalling 36 games.

== Club information ==
Team	Manager	Main sponsor	Kit supplier	Stadium	Capacity
Athlone Town	(Republic of Ireland) Michael O'Connor	Ganly's Hardware	O'Neills	St. Mel's Park	3,000
Cobh Ramblers	(Republic of Ireland) Stephen Henderson	Goodyear	Uhlsport	St. Colman's Park	5,000
Dundalk	(Republic of Ireland) John Gill	IJM Timber Frame Company	Diadora	Oriel Park	11,000
Finn Harps	(Republic of Ireland) Anthony Gorman	Harley's Cheers Bar	PF Sports	Finn Park	7,900
Galway United	(Republic of Ireland) Tony Cousins	Harrmack Developments Ltd.	Umbro	Terryland Park	3,500
Kildare County	(Republic of Ireland) John Ryan	Celbridge Football Park	Umbro	Station Road	2,500
Kilkenny City	(Republic of Ireland) Adrian Fitzpatrick	The Kilkenny Voice	Umbro	Buckley Park	6,500
Limerick	(Republic of Ireland) Danny Drew	Asian Harvest	Jako	Hogan Park	9,000
Monaghan United	(Republic of Ireland) Mick Cooke	The Steering Wheel	Diadora	Century Homes Park	3,000
Shamrock Rovers	(Republic of Ireland) Pat Scully	Woodie's DIY	Umbro	Tolka Park	10,100

== Overview ==
In March 2006 it was announced that the League of Ireland and the Football Association of Ireland would be merging. As part of this arrangement the league would be restructured and membership of the 2007 Premier Division and 2007 First Division would be decided by an Independent Assessment Group chaired by a former FAI honorary secretary, Des Casey. Clubs would be assessed on their past five season record in the league. Crucially though, clubs would also be graded on off-field criteria, including attendance, infrastructure, governance, strategic planning, finance, youth development and marketing. This decision would have a considerable impact on the 2006 First Division which began on March 10 and finished on November 18. The season developed into three-way battle between Shamrock Rovers, Dundalk and Galway United. Shamrock Rovers eventually emerged as champions while Dundalk finished second and went on to defeat Waterford United in a promotion/relegation play-off. However it was subsequently announced that Dundalk had failed to meet the Independent Assessment Group criteria and they would not be promoted to the Premier Division and that third placed Galway United would be promoted instead. The decision proved to be controversial and Dundalk were particularly aggrieved. On 13 December, Mark 'Maxi' Kavanagh, a Dundalk fan protesting the decision entered the FAI's headquarters in Merrion Square and allegedly threatened to set himself on fire after pouring petrol on his head and on furniture in the offices and reception area. He gave up the protest after obtaining a meeting with Dundalk manager John Gill. Dundalk eventually accepted the FAI decision and remained in the First Division.

== Final table ==
Pos	Team	Pld	W	D	L	GF	GA	GD	Pts	Promotion or qualification
1	Shamrock Rovers	36	21	12	3	53	13	+40	72 (Note: Shamrock Rovers were deducted 3 points for fielding a suspended player, Paul Shiels against Dundalk on 23 July.)	Promoted to Premier Division
2	Dundalk	36	22	5	9	57	33	+24	71	(Note: Dundalk did not meet the criteria set out by the FAI's Independent Assessment Group were not promoted.)
3	Galway United	36	19	12	5	57	25	+32	69	Promoted to Premier Division (Note: Galway United were promoted after passing the criteria set out by the FAI's Independent Assessment Group.)
4	Cobh Ramblers	36	16	10	10	50	33	+17	58	
5	Limerick	36	14	5	17	38	48	−10	47	
6	Finn Harps	36	12	10	14	49	45	+4	46	
7	Kildare County	36	11	10	15	38	55	−17	43	
8	Athlone Town	36	11	9	16	29	47	−18	42	
9	Monaghan United	36	6	9	21	32	64	−32	27	
10	Kilkenny City	36	3	8	25	25	65	−40	17	

== Promotion/relegation play-off ==
Dundalk who finished second played off against Waterford United who finished eleventh in the Premier Division.

1st Leg

22 November 2006	Dundalk	1–1	Waterford United

2nd Leg

25 November 2006	Waterford United	1–2	Dundalk

Dundalk won 3–2 on aggregate but did not meet the criteria set out by the FAI's Independent Assessment Group and were not promoted.

== IAG table ==
Pos	Team	Off field	On field	Total	
1	Derry City	370	460	830	
2	Cork City	348	460	808	
3	Bohemians	372	423	795	
4	Shelbourne (Note: Shelbourne were relegated to the First Division for financial irregularities.)	278	493	771	Relegated to First Division
5	St Patrick's Athletic	364	407	771	
6	UCD	374	370	744	
7	Drogheda United	300	437	737	
8	Shamrock Rovers	346	377	723	Promoted to Premier Division
9	Longford Town	284	430	714	
10	Sligo Rovers	360	343	703	
11	Bray Wanderers	351	333	684	
12	Galway United (Note: Galway United were promoted after passing the criteria set out by the FAI's Independent Assessment Group.)	389	267	656	Promoted to Premier Division
13	Waterford United (Note: Waterford United lost promotion/relegation play-off but subsequently replaced Shelbourne for the 2007 season.)	296	340	636	Remained in Premier Division
14	Dundalk (Note: Dundalk's 'on field' results from the previous five seasons dropped their position from eighth to 14th in the IAG table and, as a result, they were not promoted - despite winning the promotion/relegation play-off.)	348	247	595	Remained in First Division
15	Finn Harps	310	283	593	
16	Cobh Ramblers	315	240	555	
17	Monaghan United	331	173	504	
18	Kildare County	265	230	495	
19	Athlone Town	305	177	482	
20	Kilkenny City	266	177	443	
21	Limerick	-	243	243	
22	Dublin City (Note: Dublin City withdrew from league on 18 July. All their results were expunged.)	-	-	-	Withdrew from league

== Top scorers ==
Player	Club	Goals
(Republic of Ireland) Philip Hughes	Dundalk	19
(Republic of Ireland) Conor Gethins	Finn Harps/Galway United	16
(Republic of Ireland) Tadhg Purcell	Shamrock Rovers	12
(Republic of Ireland) Barry Moran	Galway United	11

== Gallery ==
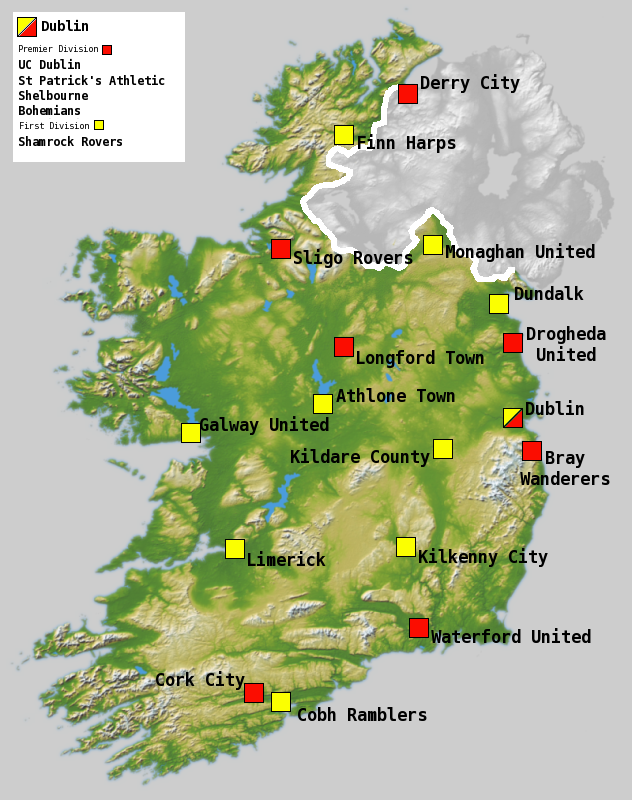
The clubs that competed in the 2006 League of Ireland.

== See also ==
- 2006 League of Ireland Premier Division
- 2006 League of Ireland Cup
