= 2007 League of Ireland Premier Division =

League of Ireland Premier Division
- Season: 2007
- Champions: Drogheda United (1st title)
- Relegated: Waterford United; Longford Town
- UEFA Champions League: Drogheda United
- UEFA Cup: St Patrick's Athletic; Cork City
- UEFA Intertoto Cup: Bohemians
- Setanta Sports Cup: Drogheda United; St Patrick's Athletic; Cork City; Derry City
- Top goalscorer: David Mooney: 19 (Longford Town)

The 2007 League of Ireland Premier Division was the 23rd season of the League of Ireland Premier Division. The division was made up of 12 teams. Drogheda United were champions for the first time while St Patrick's Athletic finished as runners-up.

== Club information ==
The clubs competing in the 2007 League of Ireland.

Team	Base	Manager	Main sponsor	Kit supplier	Stadium	Capacity
Bohemians	Phibsborough	(Northern Ireland) Sean Connor	Des Kelly Interiors	Diadora	Dalymount Park	8,500
Bray Wanderers	Bray	(Republic of Ireland) Eddie Gormley	Hard Metal	Umbro	Carlisle Grounds	7,000
Cork City	Cork	(Republic of Ireland) Damien Richardson	Beamish	O'Neill's	Turners Cross	8,000
Derry City	Derry	(Scotland) John Robertson	MeteorElectrical.com	Umbro	Brandywell Stadium	7,700
Drogheda United	Drogheda	(Republic of Ireland) Paul Doolin	Murphy Environmental	Jako	United Park	5,400
Galway United	Galway	(Republic of Ireland) Tony Cousins	Harrmack Developments	Umbro	Terryland Park	4,500
Kildare County	Newbridge	(Republic of Ireland) John Ryan	Swifts	Umbro	Station Road	2,500
Shamrock Rovers	Drumcondra	(Republic of Ireland) Pat Scully	Woodie's DIY	Umbro	Tolka Park	12,000
Sligo Rovers	Sligo	(England) Paul Cook	Toher's	Jako	The Showgrounds	5,500
St Patrick's Athletic	Inchicore	(Republic of Ireland) John McDonnell	Paddy Power	Umbro	Richmond Park	5,500
UCD	Belfield	(Republic of Ireland) Pete Mahon	Budweiser	O'Neills	Belfield Park	2,500
Waterford United	Waterford	(Republic of Ireland) Gareth Cronin	Perennial Freight	Diadora	Waterford Regional Sports Centre	8,000

== Overview ==
The close-period between the 2006 and 2007 seasons saw one of the biggest departures of senior talent from the League of Ireland and across the Irish Sea in recent times. The profile of the league had been improved by the recent successes of Derry City and Shelbourne in Europe. In addition former players such as Kevin Doyle, one of the top-scorers in the 2006–07 FA Premier League and once of Cork City, attracted attention from numerous managers in Scotland and England. Some of the top players to depart included David Forde and Jason Byrne, both of whom moved to Cardiff City. Cork City saw George O'Callaghan and Danny Murphy depart for Ipswich Town and Motherwell respectively. UCD players, Patrick Kavanagh and Gary Dicker both moved to Birmingham City. Others who made the journey across the water included Colin Hawkins, Trevor Molloy, Paul Keegan. League of Ireland managers also found themselves attracting interest with Stephen Kenny moving from Derry City to Dunfermline Athletic.

The league season kicked off on 9 March. Derry City were initially regarded as favourites to win the Premier Division by numerous bookmakers, closely followed by Drogheda United and Cork City. Despite this, Derry City made a poor start to the season losing to strong title-contenders St Patrick's Athletic and Drogheda United in their early-season encounters. They also lost 4–1 to Cork City at home in the fifth round of games. Meanwhile, St Patrick's Athletic raced into an early-season lead at the top of the table, having won all of their first five fixtures. With a third of the season remaining Drogheda United had risen to the top of the Premier Division table and have since sealed the first league title in their history. On 18 October they beat Cork City 2–1 at United Park which guaranteed the title for them. It had looked like they might have possibly had to wait another week to wrap up the league but a strike from Guy Bates in the last minute gave Drogheda victory on the night which was enough to see them become league champions. The relegation battle was very tight. Longford Town were bottom for the majority of the season, having been deducted six points but going into the final day of the season, they were just three points behind Waterford United and had a far superior goal difference. Longford did what they had to do by beating Derry City 3–1 but Waterford got a point which meant that Longford were relegated. Waterford were still not safe, though, as they had to play in the relegation/promotion playoff where they beaten by Finn Harps which meant that they were still relegated.

== Final table ==
Pos	Team	Pld	W	D	L	GF	GA	GD	Pts	Qualification or relegation
1	Drogheda United (C)	33	19	11	3	48	24	+24	68	Qualification to Champions League first qualifying round
2	St Patrick's Athletic	33	18	7	8	54	29	+25	61	Qualification to UEFA Cup first qualifying round
3	Bohemians	33	16	10	7	35	17	+18	58	Qualification to Intertoto Cup first round
4	Cork City	33	15	10	8	44	32	+12	55	Qualification to UEFA Cup first qualifying round (Note: Cork City qualified for the UEFA Cup first qualifying round after winning the 2007 FAI Cup Final.)
5	Shamrock Rovers	33	14	9	10	36	26	+10	51	
6	Sligo Rovers	33	12	5	16	34	45	−11	41	
7	Derry City	33	8	13	12	30	31	−1	37	
8	Galway United	33	7	14	12	28	35	−7	35	
9	Bray Wanderers	33	8	10	15	30	48	−18	34	
10	UCD	33	7	10	16	31	44	−13	31	
11	Waterford United (R)	33	7	9	17	23	47	−24	30	Qualification to Relegation play-off
12	Longford Town (Note: Longford Town deducted 6 points for failing to meet licensing requirements.) (R)	33	9	8	16	34	49	−15	29	Relegation to League of Ireland First Division

(C) Champions; (R) Relegated

== Results ==
=== Matches 1–22 ===
Home \ Away	BOH	BRW	COR	DER	DRO	GAL	LON	SHM	SLI	StP	UCD	WAT
Bohemians	—	2–0	2–1	0–0	0–0	1–1	5–0	2–1	1–0	2–0	0–0	1–0
Bray Wanderers	1–0	—	1–1	1–1	1–2	0–1	1–3	0–2	2–0	0–0	2–1	2–1
Cork City	2–1	2–2	—	1–1	0–0	0–0	2–0	0–0	1–2	1–0	4–1	2–0
Derry City	0–0	1–0	1–4	—	0–1	0–0	3–1	1–0	4–1	0–1	0–1	1–1
Drogheda United	1–0	4–1	2–2	2–1	—	2–2	1–1	0–2	3–0	2–0	3–2	3–0
Galway United	0–1	0–1	1–2	1–1	2–3	—	1–1	1–1	0–2	0–1	0–0	1–2
Longford Town	3–0	1–1	1–2	0–0	0–1	0–3	—	0–3	0–1	1–2	1–0	1–0
Shamrock Rovers	0–0	1–0	2–0	1–1	1–2	1–0	2–0	—	1–0	0–0	2–0	2–0 (Note: The match between Shamrock Rovers and Waterford United on 18 May was abandoned at 1–1 in the 52nd minute due to an unstable floodlight pylon. Rovers won the replay 2–0 on 10 July)
Sligo Rovers	2–1	3–0	4–1	0–2	0–2	1–1	2–1	2–0	—	0–4	1–0	1–1
St Patrick's Athletic	0–0	3–1	1–1	2–1	1–0	1–2	4–2	2–1	3–1	—	1–1	3–0
UCD	1–0	2–0	0–1	1–1	0–1	2–2	2–2	0–0	0–2	2–2	—	3–0
Waterford United	0–1	1–2	1–0	0–1	1–1	1–0	2–1	0–2	1–2	2–1	1–3	—

Legend: Blue = home team win; Yellow = draw; Red = away team win.

=== Matches 23–33 ===
Home \ Away	BOH	BRW	COR	DER	DRO	GAL	LON	SHM	SLI	StP	UCD	WAT
Bohemians	—	—	—	—	1–1	2–0	0–0	0–2	3–0	—	2–0	—
Bray Wanderers	0–3	—	1–1	—	—	1–1	—	3–0	2–1	—	—	—
Cork City	0–1	—	—	—	—	0–0	3–2	1–0	—	0–1	—	—
Derry City	1–2	3–0	1–2	—	—	—	—	1–1	—	1–0	0–0	—
Drogheda United	—	1–1	2–1	1–0	—	—	—	—	1–0	—	0–1	—
Galway United	—	—	—	1–0	1–1	—	2–1	—	2–0	0–1	2–1	—
Longford Town	—	1–0	—	3–1	1–2	—	—	—	1–1	2–1	—	1–1
Shamrock Rovers	—	—	—	—	0–2	4–0	0–1	—	0–0	—	—	0–0
Sligo Rovers	—	—	0–1	0–0	—	—	—	—	—	2–3	2–1	1–2
St Patrick's Athletic	0–1	4–2	—	—	0–0	—	—	5–0	—	—	—	4–1
UCD	—	1–1	1–2	—	—	—	0–1	2–4	—	0–3	—	2–1
Waterford United	0–0	0–0	0–3	2–1	1–1	0–0	—	—	—	—	—	—

Legend: Blue = home team win; Yellow = draw; Red = away team win.

== Play-offs ==
=== Promotion/Relegation ===
Finn Harps and Dundalk who finished second and third in the First Division played off against Waterford United who finished eleventh in the Premier Division.

First round

16 November 2007	Finn Harps	2–0	Dundalk

Finn Harps qualified for second round.

Second round

20 November 2007	Finn Harps	3–0	Waterford United

23 November 2007	Waterford United	3–3	Finn Harps

Finn Harps win 6–3 on aggregate and are promoted to Premier Division.

=== Setanta Sports Cup ===
After winning the First Division, Cobh Ramblers also qualified for the new Setanta Sports Cup play-off. Their opponents were Derry City, the winners of the 2007 League of Ireland Cup.

19 November 2007	Derry City	2–1	Cobh Ramblers	Brandywell Stadium
	McCourt 16'; Hargan 23'		O'Neill 62'

Derry City qualify for 2008 Setanta Sports Cup.

== Awards ==
=== Top goalscorers ===
Goalscorers	Goals	Team
(Republic of Ireland) David Mooney	19	Longford Town
(Republic of Ireland) Mark Quigley	15	St Patrick's Athletic
(Republic of Ireland) Roy O'Donovan	14	Cork City (Note: Roy O'Donovan transferred to Sunderland in August 2007.)
(Republic of Ireland) Tadhg Purcell	12	Shamrock Rovers
(Bosnia and Herzegovina) Fahrudin Kudozovic	11	Sligo Rovers
(Republic of Ireland) Éamon Zayed	11	Drogheda United

=== Player of the Month ===
Month	Name	Club
March	(Republic of Ireland) Alan Kirby	St Patrick's Athletic
April	(Republic of Ireland) Brian Shelley	Drogheda United
May	(Republic of Ireland) Tadhg Purcell	Shamrock Rovers
June	(Republic of Ireland) Derek Glynn	Galway United
July	(Republic of Ireland) Matthew Judge	Sligo Rovers
August	(Republic of Ireland) Dave Mooney	Longford Town
September	(England) Guy Bates	Drogheda United
October	(Republic of Ireland) Brian Shelley	Drogheda United
November	(Republic of Ireland) Conor Gethins	Finn Harps (Note: Conor Gethins was playing in First Division.)

== Off-field issues ==
=== Prize funds ===
Between the League of Ireland, FAI Cup, League of Ireland Cup and the Setanta Cup a prize fund in excess of €1 million will be available. The FAI will be investing a total of €803,000 for prize funds in 2007. The prize fund for the Premiership in 2007 will reach €450,000 with the winner being awarded €225,000. The First Division winner's prize fund in 2007 will be €50,000, with €100,000 available in total. The following table gives a more detailed breakdown of the prize funds.

Position	Premier Division	First Division	League Cup	Fair Play
1	€225,000	€50,000	€10,000	€4,500 x 2
2	€100,000	€30,000	€5,000	€2,000 x 2
3	€50,000	€10,000	€2,500	
4	€25,000	€6,000	€2,500	
5	€15,000	€4,000		
6	€12,000			
7	€9,500			
8	€7,500			
9	€6,000			
Totals	€450,000	€100,000	€20,000	€13,000

=== Media coverage ===
Broadcasting partners of the FAI - Setanta Sports, TG4 and RTÉ - agreed to televise over 50 live games in the 2007 season. The agreed games included League of Ireland games, as well as Setanta Cup matches and FAI Cup matches. TV3 also agreed to continue showing their highlights programme, eircom League Weekly, on a Monday night each week.

=== FIFA's two-club ruling ===
A significant number of players, who had already played with two clubs within the year prior to the season's kick-off, were left ineligible to play for their clubs until July at the beginning of the season as FIFA's rules, or, in particular, Article 5.3 of FIFA's Regulations for the Status and Transfer of Players, stated that no player could play for more than two different clubs between 1 July of one season and 30 June of the following year. The highest-profile members of the group of ten were the Irish internationally capped midfielders Gareth Farrelly and Colin Healy. Both players had agreed two-year deals with Cork City but their clearance failed to come through from FIFA due to the fact that they had each been registered to two other clubs since 1 July 2006. Among the other Premier Division players hit with the ruling were: Bray Wanderers midfielder Alan Cawley; Derry City striker Peter Hynes; and Ray Scully of Waterford United.

The Football Association of Ireland argued to FIFA that, as they ran a league with an unconventional Summer season out of tandem with the calendar of most other European national leagues, around which the rule was based, such circumstances ought to be permissible for players playing in the League. However, with two weeks of the league season completed, the association had yet to come to an agreement with FIFA. As a result, in failing to ensure that the clubs under its jurisdiction would be able to field their full squads at the outset of the season, the FAI came in for criticism. Numerous fans of the league condemned what they viewed to be carelessly negligent short-sightedness on the part of the association.

By 23 March 2007, three of the group were cleared to play by FIFA. The players who were cleared to play were Gary Rogers of Galway United, Alan Cawley of Bray Wanderers and Shaun Holmes of Finn Harps, while decisions on the remainder were not expected for another week. On 2 April, it was announced that Colin Healy and Gareth Farrelly both failed to gain clearance to play for Cork City. While the FAI had taken the cases forward to FIFA on behalf of most of the players, it was Cork City who decided to have their own legal team represent their two players.

It was announced on 5 April that Peter Hynes had received clearance by FIFA. This concluded the wait for decisions on all ten players as the remainder (bar the two Cork City players) were also given exemptions. The other players cleared were: John Brophy and Mark Leech of Shelbourne; Willie Doyle of Monaghan United; and Ray Scully. In the meantime, Cork City suggested that they would be appealing FIFA's decision not to grant their two players clearance on 18 April 2007 by 20 April deadline. The club made a 'strongly worded submission' to FIFA in relation to the issue asking FIFA to reconsider and were in consultation with people within the game, in legal circles and even those involved in politics. FIFA rejected Cork City's appeal on 23 April but the club stated that they may take the case to the Court of Arbitration for Sport as a last resort. When they did eventually take the case to this stage, it was once again decided against their favour, meaning that the two players had to wait to July until they could represent Cork City.

=== The CityWeb affair ===
After having fined Cork City manager, Damien Richardson, during the 2006 season for critical comments he had made against a referee after a game, as well as handing him a four-match touchline ban, and comments from the then Bohemians manager, Gareth Farrelly, expressing that he felt gagged, the FAI continued to restrict critical opinions of their structures from individuals connected with clubs in the league. On 15 February 2007, Derry City were requested by the FAI to remove a blog entry posted on their official website - CityWeb - by fan, 'MariborKev'. The entry, entitled "Another fine mess", which criticised the administration of the FAI in dealing with the financial irregularities at Shelbourne, even went on to predict that the organisation would get in contact with the club over the post to demand its removal. The article was said to have breached terms of the Participation Agreement, which the club had signed in order to take part in the 2007 competition. As a result, the club's webmaster was forced to move the blogging system to a separate domain, unconnected to the official club site. A number of weeks later, on 6 March, it was revealed that the club had been fined €5,000 by the FAI. The body also made it known to the club that for every further day the offending article remained on the site, it would punish Derry by another €1,000. This was despite the fact the blogging area had been moved to another site weeks earlier. Derry City eventually had their punishment overturned after a successful appeal by the club's legal team.

=== Attendances ===
The league reported a significant increase in attendance figures for the opening weekend of the season with the average gate up 17 per cent from the same weekend in 2006. A total of 20,632 people paid into 11 fixtures on the opening weekend of the season. This equated to an average attendance of almost 1,900 which, compared with the 1,600 mean figure from a year previously, represented an increase of 17 per cent. The figures constituted an early success for the newly appointed National Club Promotions Officer, Noel Mooney, who was appointed to co-ordinate the new Club Promotions Officers at 16 League of Ireland clubs.

With the attendance figures eclipsing the projected targets, Mooney commented:

It is a very encouraging way to begin the new season and gives us something to build on. We know that there is huge public interest in the league and our goal is to see that reflected in attendance figures. Our target for the opening weekend of fixtures was 18,000, so to clear that figure is fantastic. However, there are over thirty weeks of action ahead of us - the real work starts now.

The improved attendance rate was maintained as the season progressed as a total of 97,656 patrons attended fixtures over the first six weeks season. The figure for the same period for the 2006 season was just 65,828, with the average attendance of 1,480 per game throughout the 2007 Premier Division and 2007 League of Ireland First Division equating to a massive rise of 37% in attendances.

=== FIFA 08 ===
On 8 June 2007, it was announced that the FAI had teamed up with Electronic Arts and that the League of Ireland would feature in the FIFA 08 computer game; the first time for the league to feature in the FIFA series. Top players from the league, including Derry City's Paddy McCourt and Joseph N'Do of St Patrick's Athletic, were present at the official announcement and photocall of the deal, which took place in Temple Bar, Dublin, on 11 June 2007. All 12 teams in the League of Ireland's Premier Division would feature in the game, it was confirmed. At the event, Fran Gavin, Director of the League of Ireland said:

We are thrilled to be working with EA Sports to bring our league to a worldwide audience of millions. Having the eircom League of Ireland included in FIFA 08 is very exciting for supporters of the league, and it will also enable people around the world to play FAI eircom League of Ireland fixtures on their computer consoles.

== See also ==
- 2007 League of Ireland First Division
- 2007 League of Ireland Cup
