= 2007 League of Ireland First Division =

League of Ireland First Division
- Season: 2007
- Champions: Cobh Ramblers
- Promoted: Finn Harps
- Setanta Sports Cup: Cobh Ramblers
- Top goalscorer: Conor Gethins: 15 (Finn Harps)

The 2007 League of Ireland First Division season was the 23rd season of the League of Ireland First Division. The First Division was contested by 10 teams and Cobh Ramblers won the division. Finn Harps were also promoted to the Premier Division after a play-off and Wexford Youths made their League of Ireland debut.

== Club information ==
Team	Base	Manager	Main sponsor	Kit supplier	Stadium	Capacity
Athlone Town	Athlone	(Republic of Ireland) Michael O'Connor	Ganly's Hardware	O'Neills	Athlone Town Stadium	6,000
Cobh Ramblers	Cobh	(Republic of Ireland) Stephen Henderson	Goodyear	Uhlsport	St. Colman's Park	5,000
Dundalk	Dundalk	(Republic of Ireland) John Gill	IJM Timber Frame Company	Umbro	Oriel Park	6,000
Finn Harps	Ballybofey	(Republic of Ireland) Paul Hegarty	Crawford Furnishings	PF Sports	Finn Park	7,900
Kildare County	Newbridge	(Republic of Ireland) John Ryan	Swifts	Umbro	Station Road	2,500
Kilkenny City	Kilkenny	(Republic of Ireland) Brendan Rea	The Kilkenny Voice	Umbro	Buckley Park	6,500
Limerick 37	Limerick	(Republic of Ireland) Paul McGee	Limerick's Live 95FM	Errea	Jackman Park	2,500
Monaghan United	Monaghan	(Republic of Ireland) Mick Cooke	The Squeeling Pig	Diadora	Century Homes Park	3,000
Shelbourne	Drumcondra	(Republic of Ireland) Dermot Keely	JW Hire	Umbro	Tolka Park	12,000
Wexford Youths	Crossabeg	(Republic of Ireland) Mick Wallace	Wallace Construction	O'Neills	Ferrycarrig Park	2,500

== Overview ==
The regular season began on 8 March and concluded on 10 November. Each team played the other teams four times, totalling 36 games.

== Final table ==
Pos	Team	Pld	W	D	L	GF	GA	GD	Pts	Qualification or relegation
1	Cobh Ramblers (C)	36	22	11	3	57	17	+40	77	Premier Division / Setanta Cup play-off
2	Finn Harps	36	23	7	6	61	20	+41	76	Premier Division after play-off
3	Dundalk	36	19	9	8	56	30	+26	66	Lost promotion/relegation play-off
4	Limerick 37 (Note: Limerick 37 replaced Limerick F.C. as members of League of Ireland.)	36	14	11	11	46	41	+5	53	
5	Shelbourne	36	11	10	15	46	46	0	43	
6	Athlone Town	36	11	8	17	40	55	−15	41	
7	Kildare County	36	9	12	15	48	62	−14	39	
8	Monaghan United	36	9	11	16	38	52	−14	38	
9	Wexford Youths (Note: Wexford Youths replaced Dublin City as members of League of Ireland.)	36	7	10	19	32	55	−23	31	
10	Kilkenny City	36	5	11	20	33	79	−46	26	

Rules for classification: 1) points; 2) goal difference; 3) number of goals scored.
(C) Champions

== Play-offs ==
=== Promotion/Relegation ===
Finn Harps and Dundalk who finished second and third in the First Division played off against Waterford United who finished eleventh in the Premier Division.

First round

16 November 2007	Finn Harps	2–0	Dundalk

Finn Harps qualified for second round.

Second round

20 November 2007	Finn Harps	3–0	Waterford United

23 November 2007	Waterford United	3–3	Finn Harps

Finn Harps win 6–3 on aggregate and are promoted to Premier Division.

=== Setanta Sports Cup ===
After winning the First Division, Cobh Ramblers also qualified for the new Setanta Sports Cup play-off. Their opponents were Derry City, the winners of the 2007 League of Ireland Cup.

19 November 2007	Derry City	2–1	Cobh Ramblers	Brandywell Stadium
	McCourt 16'; Hargan 23'		O'Neill 62'

Derry City qualify for 2008 Setanta Sports Cup.

== Top scorers ==
Goalscorers	Goals	Team
(Republic of Ireland) Conor Gethins	15	Finn Harps
(Republic of Ireland) Davin O'Neill	14	Cobh Ramblers
(Republic of Ireland) Anthony Flood	13	Shelbourne/Dundalk
(Republic of Ireland) Philip Gorman	13	Kildare County
(Republic of Ireland) Mark Leech	12	Shelbourne

== Gallery ==
The clubs competing in the 2007 FAI eircom League of Ireland.

== See also ==
- 2007 Shelbourne F.C. season
- 2007 League of Ireland Premier Division
- 2007 League of Ireland Cup
