= 2001–02 League of Ireland Premier Division =

League of Ireland Premier Division
- Season: 2001–02
- Champions: Shelbourne FC (10th title)
- Relegated: Dundalk; Galway United; Monaghan United
- UEFA Champions League: Shelbourne FC
- UEFA Cup: Shamrock Rovers; Dundalk
- UEFA Intertoto Cup: St Patrick's Athletic
- Top goalscorer: Glen Crowe: 21 (Bohemians)

The 2001–02 League of Ireland Premier Division was the 17th season of the League of Ireland Premier Division. The division was made up of 12 teams. Shelbourne were crowned champions for the tenth time.

== Regular season ==
The season saw each team playing three rounds of games, playing every other team three times, totalling 33 games. The 2002–03 season would see the League of Ireland Premier Division reduced from 12 to 10 teams. As a result, three teams were automatically relegated. The season is best remembered for the controversy involving allegations of St Patrick's Athletic fielding ineligible players. St. Pat's originally had 9 points deducted for fielding Paul Marney in the first three games of the season. This was later revoked after arbitration. However Shelbourne appealed against this decision which was taken to the High Court where the appeal was rejected. It was then discovered by the Shelbourne chief executive, Ollie Byrne, that Charles Livingstone Mbabazi had not been registered by St. Pat's for the first five games of the season and so the club had 15 points deducted, three points for each game. The decision of the FAI appeal board to dismiss St. Pat's appeal in the Livingstone case saw Shelbourne confirmed as league champions.

=== Final table ===
Pos	Team	Pld	W	D	L	GF	GA	GD	Pts	Qualification or relegation
1	Shelbourne (C)	33	19	6	8	50	28	+22	63	Qualification to Champions League first qualifying round
2	Shamrock Rovers	33	17	6	10	54	32	+22	57	Qualification to UEFA Cup qualifying round
3	St Patrick's Athletic (Note: St Patrick's Athletic had 15 points deducted for fielding an ineligible player.)	33	20	8	5	59	29	+30	53	Qualification to Intertoto Cup first round
4	Bohemians	33	14	10	9	57	32	+25	52	
5	Derry City	33	14	9	10	42	30	+12	51	
6	Cork City	33	14	7	12	48	39	+9	49	
7	UCD	33	12	12	9	40	39	+1	48	
8	Bray Wanderers	33	12	10	11	54	45	+9	46	
9	Longford Town (O)	33	10	10	13	41	51	−10	40	Qualification to Relegation play-off
10	Dundalk (R)	33	9	12	12	37	46	−9	39	UEFA Cup qualifying and relegation to First Division (Note: Dundalk qualified for the UEFA Cup qualifying round after winning the 2001–02 FAI Cup.)
11	Galway United (R)	33	5	4	24	28	73	−45	19	Relegation to League of Ireland First Division
12	Monaghan United (R)	33	2	6	25	19	85	−66	12	Relegation to League of Ireland First Division

Source: www.rsssf.com
(C) Champions; (O) Play-off winners; (R) Relegated

=== Results ===
==== Matches 1–22 ====
Home \ Away	BOH	BRW	COR	DER	DUN	GAL	LON	MON	SHM	SHE	StP	UCD
Bohemians	—	2–0	2–2	1–0	1–1	3–0	1–1	3–0	0–1	4–6	0–2	6–0
Bray Wanderers	0–0	—	2–2	0–0	5–1	2–0	5–1	5–0	1–1	0–3	0–2	1–1
Cork City	0–1	2–2	—	1–0	0–1	4–0	2–1	2–0	2–1	1–0	2–1	0–2
Derry City	1–0	3–1	1–0	—	1–1	2–0	1–1	2–0	2–0	0–0	3–1	1–1
Dundalk	1–1	0–3	1–3	1–0	—	1–1	1–1	3–0	0–0	1–1	0–2	1–1
Galway United	1–5	0–2	0–3	0–1	0–1	—	1–1	8–0	0–2	0–1	0–4	1–0
Longford Town	2–0	3–2	4–1	1–0	2–2	1–2	—	1–1	1–2	1–0	3–3	1–3
Monaghan United	1–1	1–1	2–2	1–2	1–0	0–0	0–2	—	2–3	0–1	0–4	1–4
Shamrock Rovers	1–0	4–0	1–3	1–1	1–0	3–0	0–0	4–0	—	3–0	0–0	0–1
Shelbourne	1–0	2–0	2–1	0–1	4–0	3–0	2–0	3–1	2–0	—	1–1	0–1
St Patrick's Athletic	1–1	2–0	1–3	1–0	2–0	3–0	3–2	1–1	2–1	3–2	—	1–2
UCD	1–1	1–2	1–0	2–2	2–1	1–2	1–0	1–0	1–3	0–0	0–0	—

Legend: Blue = home team win; Yellow = draw; Red = away team win.

==== Matches 23–33 ====
Home \ Away	BOH	BRW	COR	DER	DUN	GAL	LON	MON	SHM	SHE	StP	UCD
Bohemians	—	—	—	1–0	—	—	1–0	3–0	1–1	4–0	—	3–0
Bray Wanderers	2–2	—	0–2	—	1–2	—	4–1	—	2–1	0–0	—	—
Cork City	0–3	—	—	—	0–0	—	—	5–1	0–2	0–1	—	—
Derry City	—	1–2	1–0	—	—	—	—	6–1	3–0	—	—	1–1
Dundalk	3–1	—	—	4–2	—	1–1	—	—	—	1–2	0–1	1–1
Galway United	1–5	3–5	1–2	2–3	—	—	0–2	—	—	—	—	—
Longford Town	—	—	0–0	1–0	1–3	—	—	2–0	1–5	—	1–1	—
Monaghan United	—	0–3	—	—	0–3	1–2	—	—	—	1–0	—	0–3
Shamrock Rovers	—	—	—	—	4–1	3–0	—	3–2	—	0–2	—	3–1
Shelbourne	—	—	—	1–1	—	2–0	3–0	—	—	—	2–1	—
St Patrick's Athletic	2–0	2–1	3–2	3–0	—	3–1	—	2–1	1–0	—	—	—
UCD	—	0–0	1–1	—	—	3–1	1–2	—	—	2–3	0–0	—

Legend: Blue = home team win; Yellow = draw; Red = away team win.

== Promotion/relegation play-off ==
Longford Town who finished in ninth place played off against Finn Harps, the third placed team from the 2001–02 League of Ireland First Division.

=== 1st leg ===
20 May 2002	Longford Town	1–0	Finn Harps

=== 2nd leg ===
23 May 2002	Finn Harps	3–2	Longford Town

Longford Town win 6-5 on penalties after extra time and retain their place in the Premier Division.

Locations of the Premier Division teams

== See also ==
- 2001–02 Shelbourne F.C. season
- 2001–02 League of Ireland First Division
