= Alan Gough =

Irish footballer (born 1971)

Personal information
- Date of birth: 10 March 1971 (age 55)
- Place of birth: Watford, England
- Height: 5 ft 11 in (1.80 m)
- Position: Goalkeeper

Youth career
- Newbridge Town
- –1989: Suncroft

Senior career*
Years	Team	Apps	(Gls)
1989–1992	Portsmouth	0	(0)
1992–1993	Fulham	3	(0)
1993	Gillingham	0	(0)
1993–1994	Galway United	27	(0)
1994–1999	Shelbourne	158	(0)
1999–2002	Glentoran	103	(0)
2002–2003	Derry City	49	(0)
2004–2007	Galway United	104	(0)
2008	Bray Wanderers	22	(0)
2009	Longford Town	4	(0)
Total		470	(0)

International career
1988	Republic of Ireland U19	1	(0)
1988–1991	Republic of Ireland U21	5	(0)

Managerial career
- 2009: Longford Town
- * Club domestic league appearances and goals

Alan Gough (born 10 March 1971) is an Irish former football player and manager. He was most recently player-manager of Longford Town.

Gough won numerous major honours both north and south of the Irish border including domestic cup and league cup medals with Shelbourne, Glentoran and Derry City. His other clubs included Portsmouth, Fulham, Galway United and Bray Wanderers.

== Playing career ==
Alan Gough was born on 10 March 1971 in Watford, England but raised in Cutbush, County Kildare. He first took to goalkeeping when playing Gaelic football.

I was actually a better Gaelic footballer than I was a goal keeper. I was the same height at 16 as I am now (5 feet 11 inches). If I had stayed with it I would have done a bit of damage.

— Alan Gough, Irish Times

His ability as a keeper saw him break into the Newbridge Town football team at fifteen years old. In his second season, the club won the Leinster Junior League Premier Division and two cup competitions.

He initially began his career as an apprentice with Portsmouth before moving on to Fulham. Gough moved back to Ireland to sign for Galway United in 1993. After eighteen months with Galway, he joined Shelbourne, where he spent five seasons. He was sent off during the 1996 FAI Cup final at Lansdowne Road, although Shelbourne went on to win the trophy. He won a second FAI Cup medal and a League Cup during his time at the club.

In July 1999, Gough made the switch to Glentoran, impressing the fans with his performances in Europe and winning the Irish Cup in his first season. This was followed by an Irish Cup and League Cup double the following season. He was in terrific form in the Irish Cup Final and played a large part in the victory. Despite being regarded as the best goalkeeper in the Irish League, he left Glentoran for Derry City in 2002, citing poor treatment by manager Roy Coyle. Gough's time at Derry City got off to a difficult start with two losses in their first two matches, the second due to mistakes by Gough, but the team performed much better in the domestic cup. After overcoming Drogheda United and Waterford United, Derry beat St Patrick's Athletic in the quarter-finals. Gough then kept clean sheets in the semi-final and final to ensure victory in the FAI Cup for Derry and another FAI Cup winners medal for Gough.

Despite an expected return to Belfast with Linfield, Gough returned to Galway United in 2004. He was made team captain of the club in 2006. Gough retired at the end of the 2006 season but stayed on at Galway as assistant manager to Tony Cousins. He continued to play in 2007, occasionally appearing in goal as emergency cover, in addition to his assistant manager role. On 31 March 2008, he was sacked along with the rest of the Galway United management team.

On 22 May 2008, Gough signed with Bray Wanderers. He again came out of retirement, this time to allow Chris "Skippy" O'Connor to join the Australian national squad at the Olympics, but picked up three Player of the Month awards (for June, August and October) and retained his place for the rest of the season. His performances also earned him the Bray Wanderers Supporters Player of the Year award. He left Bray in December 2008 to take charge of Longford Town.

== International career ==
Gough represented the Republic of Ireland at under-19 and under-21 level in the late 1980s and early 1990s. He won five under-21 international caps in total with the Republic of Ireland, including a Euro 92 under-21 qualifier against England in 1991.

== Managerial career ==
On 22 December 2008, Gough was announced as the new manager of Longford Town. He stated his initial aims were to return the club's training base to Longford and to restructure their youth setup. During his time as manager, Gough was forced to don the goalkeeping gloves on more than one occasion due to the lack of a regular custodian.

Gough resigned as manager of Longford Town on 24 May 2009 following a poor run of results.

On 6 February 2025, Kiltimagh Knock United announced Gough's appointment as first team manager. By July 2025, he had stepped away from the role.

In September 2025, Gough succeeded Eoin O’Brien in charge of Newmarket Celtic.

== Honours ==
Shelbourne

- FAI Cup: 1995–96, 1996–97
- League of Ireland Cup: 1995–96

Glentoran

- Irish Cup: 1999–2000, 2000–01
- Irish League Cup: 2000–01

Derry City

- FAI Cup: 2002

Bray Wanderers

- Supporters' Player of the Year: 2008
