= Newbridge Town F.C. =

Newbridge Town
- Full name: Newbridge Town Football Club
- Founded: 1969; 57 years ago
- Ground: Station Road, Newbridge, County Kildare
- Capacity: 2,180 (250 seats)
- Manager: Martin Russell
- League: FAI National League; Leinster Senior League
- Website: newbridgetownfc.com
Home colours	Away colours

Newbridge Town Football Club is an Irish association football club based in Newbridge, County Kildare. The club was founded in 1969 following a meeting at Newbridge Town Hall. They currently play in the FAI National League. As of the 2025–26 season, Newbridge Town's senior men's team was competing in the Leinster Senior League's Senior 1A competition.

== History ==
Founded in 1969 by members of the town's youth club, Newbridge Town Football Club entered the Counties League at Division 2. In their first ever season, Newbridge Town finished fourth and won the Counties Cup. In the subsequent seasons, the club won Division 2 and gained promotion to Division 1. After winning Division 1, they moved into the Leinster Junior League which contained Cherry Orchard, Home Farm and Wayside Celtic.

Off the pitch, Newbridge Town formed two additional teams to cater for the increased demand as well as introducing youth teams to the club. In 1973, the club committee invited German side Wacker München to play against Newbridge Boys. Two matches were organised and, while both games ended in draws, each game drew crowds in excess of 2,000 to Ryan's Field.

During these initial years, Tom Shaw became Newbridge Town's first international player when he was selected for the Irish Youth team. In 1975, Newbridge Town joined the Athletic Union League in Dublin, with some success over the following seven years. The club had to move out of Ryan's Field and were given the use of a pitch beside the railway station in Newbridge. In 1980, they purchased this land from Newbridge College and began construction on a clubhouse, while they developed the pitch into Station Road.

Newbridge Town returned to the Leinster Junior League in 1982 and, in 1985, opened their new ground. In 1989, they joined the Leinster Senior League and won the Moore Cup in their first season. In addition to developments at the club level, the 1980s brought individual recognition when goalkeeper Alan Gough followed in Tom Shaw's footsteps and represented Newbridge Town on the international scene. The club made their way through the divisions over the subsequent years before winning the Leinster Senior Division in the 1998–99 season.

In 2002, Newbridge Town were invited to join the Eircom League. However, after a formation meeting with other interested football bodies, the club decided to enter a separate entity to better garner support from the surrounding areas. The new club, called Kildare County, was run in parallel to Newbridge Town and entered the 2002–03 First Division, playing their home games at Station Road.

Newbridge Town has developed its facilities at Station Road and it now has training facilities, all-weather and grass pitches, showers and dressing rooms. A new 550-seat stand was later installed in the Station Road ground.

The club has also increased in the number of teams and it now fields two men's senior teams, one ladies senior team, an over 35s masters team and 34 schoolboy and schoolgirl teams ranging from the Under-9 to Under-18 age groups. The latter play in the Dublin and District Schoolboys League. The club also runs a boys and girls academy, starting at under-5s. In the 2020s, Ade Solanke became Newbridge Town's latest international when he represented the Republic of Ireland at the Under-17 World Cup.

In early 2025, the club was reported to be one of the applicants for the FAI National League, a new third tier competition in the Republic of Ireland football ladder. In December 2025, Newbridge Town was included in the list of accepted applicants announced by the FAI. The club are expected to compete in the truncated season of the league, beginning in Autumn 2026. The club confirmed that they would retain a team in the LSL Senior Sunday 1A division in addition to their National League side, after finishing mid-table in the LSL's third tier in 2025–26.

== Current squad ==
As of 19 September 2026

Note: Flags indicate national team as defined under FIFA eligibility rules; some limited exceptions apply. Players may hold more than one non-FIFA nationality.

No.	Pos.	Nation	Player
1	GK	IRL	Mark O'Connor
2	DF	IRL	Finn Cowper Gray
3	DF	IRL	David Oduntan
4	DF	IRL	Shay Brown
5	DF	IRL	Eric Munongo
6	MF	IRL	Nathan McAuley (captain)
7	MF	IRL	Moses Alabi
8	MF	IRL	Noah Byrne
9	FW	IRL	Darragh Bolton
10	FW	PAR	Milton Benítez
11	MF	IRL	Ruairi Brown

No.	Pos.	Nation	Player
12	MF	IRL	Conan Kruger
13	DF	IRL	Ethan Mills
14	FW	IRL	Alex Akinrintoyo
15	MF	IRL	Isaiah Phillips
16	MF	IRL	Shane O'Keeffe
17	DF	IRL	Jack Kenny
19	DF	IRL	Troy O'Dowd
20	GK	IRL	Cian Rushe
21	DF	IRL	Conor Duggan
25	GK	IRL	Sean Martin

== Grounds ==
Newbridge Town played in Ryan's Field before moving to Station Road, a pitch beside the Newbridge railway station. Station Road was purchased from Newbridge College in 1980 and the club began construction on a clubhouse. As of 2022, the clubhouse includes a sports hall, a bar and a gym. The ground's main stand seats 250 people with a corporate area for 70 guests. The club's senior men's team play their home games at the ground.

== People of note ==
Alan Gough

Alan Gough, a goalkeeper, was capped with the Republic of Ireland Under-21 international team on several occasions in the early 1990s. He moved from Newbridge to Portsmouth as an apprentice and subsequently signed for Fulham. After moving back to Ireland and signing with Galway United in 1993, he later joined Shelbourne. Following periods at Glentoran and Derry City, Gough returned to Galway United in 2004 and was the club's first team captain for the 2006 season. He retired from football at the end of the 2006 season and later became manager of Longford Town FC.

Joe Barry, Joe Carey, Jimmy Dowling and Tony Hannigan

Joe Barry, Joe Carey, Jimmy Dowling and Tony Hannigan were involved in setting up the meeting which resulted in the formation of Newbridge Town in 1969. Dowling was also later involved in the formation of Kildare County FC.

Republic of Ireland U19 internationals

- Gary Shaw (Irish footballer)

== Honours ==
- Leinster Senior League Senior Division: 1998–99
- Leinster Senior League Metropolitan Cup: 2017–2018
- Dalton Cup (1): 1986-1987
- Sheeran Cup (1): 1986-1987
