= 2001–02 League of Ireland First Division =

League of Ireland First Division
- Season: 2001–02
- Champions: Drogheda United
- Top goalscorer: Kevin McHugh (Finn Harps); 27 goals

The 2001–02 League of Ireland First Division season was the 17th season of the League of Ireland First Division.

== Overview ==
The First Division was contested by 10 teams and Drogheda United won the division. The 2002–03 season would see the League of Ireland First Division expanded from 10 to 12 teams. As a result, the runners-up, Finn Harps F.C. were not automatically promoted as in previous seasons.

== Final table ==
Pos	Team	Pld	W	D	L	GF	GA	GD	Pts	Promotion or relegation
1	Drogheda United F.C.	32	14	16	2	53	28	+25	58	Promoted to Premier Division
2	Finn Harps F.C.	32	15	9	8	51	47	+4	54	Lost promotion/relegation play-off
3	Dublin City F.C.	32	15	8	9	55	46	+9	53	
4	Waterford United F.C.	32	13	12	7	47	35	+12	48 (Note: Waterford United had three points deducted for fielding an ineligible player.)	
5	Kilkenny City A.F.C.	32	12	9	11	47	39	+8	45	
6	Sligo Rovers F.C.	32	8	9	15	35	48	−13	33	
7	Athlone Town A.F.C.	32	7	11	14	40	53	−13	32	
8	Cobh Ramblers F.C.	32	8	7	17	32	42	−10	31	
9	Limerick F.C.	32	8	7	17	32	54	−22	31	
10	St. Francis F.C.	0	0	0	0	0	0	0	0 (Note: St. Francis resigned from the League of Ireland First Division two weeks before the start of the season due to a proposed merger with St Patrick's Athletic. This withdrawal occurred too late for a replacement team to be found. The proposed merger never happened and St. Francis subsequently rejoined the Leinster Senior League.)	Resigned

== Promotion/relegation play-off ==
Second placed Finn Harps played off against Longford Town who finished in ninth place in the 2001–02 League of Ireland Premier Division. The winner would compete in the 2002–03 League of Ireland Premier Division.

=== 1st leg ===
20 April 2002	Longford Town	1–0	Finn Harps

=== 2nd leg ===
23 April 2002	Finn Harps	3–2	Longford Town

Longford Town win 6-5 on penalties after extra time and retain their place in the Premier Division.

Locations of the First Division teams

== See also ==
- 2001–02 League of Ireland Premier Division
