= Ade Solanke (footballer) =

Irish association football player (born 2008)

Personal information
- Full name: Ademide Solanke
- Date of birth: 9 January 2008 (age 18)
- Place of birth: Portarlington, County Laois
- Height: 1.75 m (5 ft 9 in)
- Position: Full back

Team information
- Current team: Bournemouth

Youth career
- –2019: Newbridge Town
- 2019–2025: Shamrock Rovers
- 2025–2026: Lorient
- 2026–: Bournemouth

Senior career*
Years	Team	Apps	(Gls)
2024	Shamrock Rovers	0	(0)
2025	Lorient B	4	(0)

International career^{‡}
2022	Republic of Ireland U15		
2023	Republic of Ireland U16		
2023–2025	Republic of Ireland U17	14	(1)
2026–	Republic of Ireland U19	8	(0)
- * Club domestic league appearances and goals as of 00:40, 9 November 2026 (UTC) ‡ National team caps and goals as of 14:42, 15 November 2026 (UTC)

Ademide Solanke (born 9 January 2008) is an Irish professional footballer who plays as a left back for Premier League club Bournemouth. He is a Republic of Ireland youth international.

== Early life ==
Solanke grew up in Portarlington, County Laois. He later moved with his family to County Kildare before they settled in Newcastle, County Dublin. He is of Nigerian descent.

== Youth career ==
He spent time with Newbridge Town, before spending six years in the Shamrock Rovers academy.

He moved to French club Lorient at the start of 2025. In January 2026, Solanke joined fellow Black Knight owned club, Premier League side AFC Bournemouth.

== International career ==
Solanke has been capped at multiple youth levels for the Republic of Ireland.

He featured for the Republic of Ireland U17s at the 2023 UEFA European Under-17 Championship in Hungary when he was only 15 as Ireland reached the quarter-finals, in which Solanke made his only appearance at the tournament, coming on as a substitute in Ireland's 0–3 defeat at the hands of Spain.

He represented the U17s once again at the 2025 FIFA U-17 World Cup in Qatar where he started in almost all of Ireland's games as they reached the round of 16.

Solanke made his debut for the Republic of Ireland U19s on 19 March 2026, in a 2027 UEFA European Under-19 Championship qualifier against Scotland which ended in a 3–3 draw.

== Career statistics ==
As of match played on 18 October 2025

Appearances and goals by club, season and competition
Club	Season	League			National cup		League cup		Other		Total	
Club	Season	Division	Apps	Goals	Apps	Goals	Apps	Goals	Apps	Goals	Apps	Goals
Shamrock Rovers	2024	LOI Premier Division	0	0	0	0	–		0	0	0	0
Lorient B	2024–25	Championnat National 3	1	0	–		–		–		1	0
Lorient B	2025–26	Championnat National 2	3	0	–		–		–		3	0
Lorient B	Total		4	0	—		—		—		4	0
Career total			4	0	0	0	0	0	0	0	4	0
