= Milton Benítez =

Paraguayan footballer (born 1986)

Personal information
- Full name: Milton Rodrigo Benítez Lirio
- Date of birth: 30 March 1986 (age 40)
- Place of birth: Pedro Juan Caballero, Paraguay
- Height: 1.73 m (5 ft 8 in)
- Position: Midfielder

Team information
- Current team: Newbridge Town
- Number: 10

Senior career*
Years	Team	Apps	(Gls)
2005–2007	Libertad	13	(0)
2006	→ 3 de Febrero (loan)	31	(7)
2008	Olimpia	4	(0)
2008–2010	3 de Febrero	30	(4)
2009	→ Vasco da Gama (loan)	3	(0)
2010–2011	Sportivo Luqueño	27	(1)
2012	Huachipato	13	(0)
2013	Sol de América	4	(0)
2014	Sportivo Luqueño	32	(0)
2015–2016	Nacional	29	(1)
2017	Rangers de Talca	23	(2)
2018	Binacional	32	(9)
2019–2020	Sport Huancayo	29	(2)
2026–	Newbridge Town	2	(0)

International career
2011	Paraguay	1	(0)
- * Club domestic league appearances and goals

Milton Rodrigo Benítez Lirio (born 30 March 1986) is a Paraguayan footballer who plays as a midfielder for FAI National League club Newbridge Town.

== Career ==
Benítez started his career in Paraguayan club Libertad in 2005, moving on to play for other clubs such as Olimpia and 3 de Febrero. He also trialed with English club Liverpool.

In December 2008, Brazilian side Vasco da Gama signed Benítez.

In Chile, Benítez played for Huachipato in 2012 and Rangers de Talca in 2017.

In Peru, Benítez played for Binacional and Sport Huancayo.

In 2026, Benítez signed for FAI National League club Newbridge Town.

== Honours ==
=== Player ===
Huachipato

- Primera División de Chile (1): 2012 Clausura
