= David Byrne (footballer, born 1979) =

Irish footballer

Personal information
- Date of birth: 14 November 1979 (age 46)
- Place of birth: Dublin, Ireland
- Position: Centre midfielder

Senior career*
Years	Team	Apps	(Gls)
1998–1999	Shelbourne		
1999–2000	Dundee United	1	(0)
2000–2003	Shelbourne		
2003	St Patrick's Athletic		
2004–2006	Derry City		
2006	Longford Town		
2007–2008	Athlone Town		
2008	Finn Harps		
2009	Kildare County		
- * Club domestic league appearances and goals

David Byrne (born 14 November 1979) is an Irish former footballer who last played for Kildare County as a central midfielder.

== Career ==
Byrne started his career with Shelbourne before a move to Scottish Premier League side Dundee United. During his season with United he made just one appearance, playing at Parkhead in a 4–1 defeat to Celtic. Byrne moved back to Shelbourne, where he played for three years, picking up a league winners' medal. Spells at St Pat's and Derry City followed, before his move to Longford in January 2006. Byrne moved to Athlone at the start of the 2007 season. Following his departure from Athlone Town in July 2008 Byrne had a short spell back in Premier Division football with Finn Harps. Byrne most recently joined First Division strugglers Kildare County in May 2009.
