= Alan McDermott =

Irish footballer

Personal information
- Full name: Alan McDermott
- Date of birth: 22 January 1982 (age 44)
- Place of birth: Dublin, Ireland
- Height: 6 ft 1 in (1.85 m)
- Position: Defender

Youth career
- 1998–1999: Manchester United

Senior career*
Years	Team	Apps	(Gls)
1999–2002	Manchester United	0	(0)
2002	Ayr United	2	(0)
2003	Arbroath	2	(0)
2003	Hamilton Academical	2	(0)
2003–2004	Shelbourne	12	(0)
2004–2005	Newry City	11	(0)
2005	Kildare County	9	(2)
2006	Dundalk	2	(0)
2006–2007	Kildare County	39	(4)

International career
2000	Republic of Ireland U17	3	(0)
- * Club domestic league appearances and goals

Alan McDermott (born 22 January 1982) is an Irish former footballer who played as a defender.

== Club career ==
Born in Dublin, McDermott was signed as a trainee by Manchester United in July 1998, before signing his first professional contract with the club on his 17th birthday. In his first season, he played 18 times for the under-17s team and three times for the under-19s, scoring four goals. In 1999–2000, he played just twice for the under-19s at the start of the season before missing the next six months; he returned for the final two matches of the campaign, scoring in the play-off second round match against Leeds United. He also made his debut for the reserve team in the Manchester Senior Cup match against Oldham Athletic on 5 April. He played twice more for the under-19s and once for the reserves in 2000–01, then six more appearances for the reserves in 2001–02, before being released at the end of the season.

McDermott joined Ayr United in 2002. After a spell on trial at Arbroath, he joined Hamilton Academical in March 2003. He went on to have spells with Shelbourne and Newry, before signing for Kildare County towards the end of 2005.

At the beginning of the 2006 season, he had a brief stint with Dundalk, before re-signing for Kildare County to fill a much needed void in the County defence. He held down a steady place with Kildare due to injuries, firstly to Phil Byrne and then to Ian Malone. He scored his first goal for Kildare in a defeat to Finn Harps in Ballybofey in September 2006.

McDermott proved his versatility during the 2007 season, playing in almost every position except in goal. He added to his goal tally with a dramatic equaliser against Shelbourne at Station Road and one against Kilkenny in the same stadium, but the other end. He was released on 25 August 2007.

== International career ==
McDermott made three appearances for the Republic of Ireland under-17 team at the Lisbon Invitational Tournament in June 2000. He played in games against the United States, Norway and Portugal, and was voted as the player of the tournament. He has also represented Eircom League U21s team.
