= The Kilkenny Voice =

Irish newspaper

- Type: Weekly newspaper
- Format: Compact
- Editor: Jimmy Rhatigan
- Founded: 6 September 2005
- Ceased publication: 18 December 2008
- Language: English
- Headquarters: 4 John's Gate, Castlecomer Road
- City: Kilkenny
- Country: Ireland

The Kilkenny Voice was southeastern Ireland's only weekly full-colour compact newspaper. It was published in Kilkenny each Tuesday; the first issue was published on 6 September 2005. Its primary competition was the Kilkenny People.

The editor of The Kilkenny Voice was Jimmy Rhatigan. The Kilkenny Voice ceased publishing on 18 December 2008.

The Kilkenny Voice sponsored Kilkenny City in the 2006 and 2007 League of Ireland First Division.
