= Richie Purdy =

Irish footballer

Personal information
- Full name: Richie Purdy
- Date of birth: 12 March 1972 (age 54)
- Place of birth: Dublin, Ireland
- Position: Defender

Senior career*
Years	Team	Apps	(Gls)
1988–1990	Home Farm	?	(?)
1990–1996	Dundalk	133	(5)
1996–1997	Derry City F.C.	22	(0)
1997–2000	Shamrock Rovers	81	(13)
2000–2001	Kilkenny City	19	(1)
2001–2003	UCD AFC	24	(1)
2003	Kildare County	20	(1)

International career
1993	Republic of Ireland U21	1	(0)
1988	Republic of Ireland U17	2	(0)
- * Club domestic league appearances and goals

Richie Purdy (born 12 March 1972) is an Irish former footballer.

== Career ==
Purdy made his League of Ireland début for Home Farm against EMFA on 6 November 1988. He spent six seasons with Dundalk, winning the League with the team in 1994/95 (scoring 2 goals in 26 appearances). During this tenure at Dundalk he won the PFAI "Young Player of the Year" award in 1992/93 PFAI.

Purdy later moved to Derry City for one season where he won another league title for the 1996/97 season. He joined Shamrock Rovers in the summer of 1997 where he stayed for four seasons, making two appearances in Europe (scoring once).

Purdy was capped by Ireland at U15, U16, U17, U18 and U21 levels. He played in two qualifiers in the 1990 UEFA European Under-18 Football Championship qualifying campaign.

His eldest son, Daniel, is who plays for Longford Town and has played for Ireland U15s and U17s. His other son Richie plays for Shamrock Rovers U19 in the League of Ireland U19 Division.
