= Pat Deans =

Irish footballer

Personal information
- Full name: Patrick Deans
- Date of birth: 28 September 1980 (age 46)
- Place of birth: Dublin, Ireland
- Position: Midfielder

Senior career*
Years	Team	Apps	(Gls)
1999–2004	Shamrock Rovers	95	(3)
2005	Dublin City	11	(0)
- * Club domestic league appearances and goals

Pat Deans (born 28 September 1980, Dublin) is an Irish footballer.

A centre half/midfielder, Deans made his League of Ireland debut for Shamrock Rovers at UCD on 2 April 2000. He made his Rovers debut at Bray in the League Cup on 5 October 1999.

He was Rovers 'Young Player of the Year' in 2000/01, when he scored four goals in 28 appearances. His first goal for the club was against St Pats in December 2000.

He also made one appearance for Rovers in European competitions, but Deans left the club at the end of the 2004 season.

== Honours ==
- SRFC Young Player of the Year:
  - Shamrock Rovers – 2000/01
