= Ger Robinson =

Irish football striker (born 1982)

Personal information
- Full name: Gerald Robinson
- Date of birth: 9 June 1982 (age 44)
- Place of birth: Ireland
- Position: Forward

Senior career*
Years	Team	Apps	(Gls)
1998–2001	Middlesbrough	0	(0)
2000–2001	Scarborough	6	(1)
2001–2002	Dundalk	17	(4)
2001–2002	Kilkenny City	9	(2)
2002–2003	Longford Town	6	(1)
2003	Monaghan United	?	(0)
2006–2008	Kildare County	46	(11)

International career
1999	Republic of Ireland U17	1	(0)
- * Club domestic league appearances and goals

Ger Robinson (born 9 June 1982) is an Irish former football striker, who last played for Kildare County in the League of Ireland. He is also involved in Gaelic football and has managed the Meath under-20 county team.

== Biography ==
Robinson was signed by Middlesbrough as an apprentice at age 14 and trained alongside the likes of Fabrizio Ravanelli, Juninho and Paul Gascoigne as a youngster with Middlesbrough. Despite showing promise, he was never promoted to the senior team, and after ITV digital went bankrupt he returned to Ireland on loan at Dundalk

He scored on his League of Ireland debut at home to Shels on 27 August 2001 and at the end of the season he picked up an FAI Cup winner's medal. He then had spells with Kilkenny City, Monaghan United and Longford Town before changing codes to play GAA. For Longford he scored one goal in 7 total appearances

He picked up a Meath Senior Football Championship winner's medal for St Peters Dunboyne in the following years, where he was man of the match in the final .

Robinson returned to soccer when his uncle John Ryan gave him a chance to line out for Kildare County while maintaining his GAA commitments at the same time. In the 2006 seasons and the 2007 seasons he played for Kildare County only in the latter end of the season due to GAA commitments. In this spell he scored 10 goals in 15 games. In 2008, he committed solely to soccer and played the entire season but only scored 1 goal in 31 appearances. He did not play for The Thoroughbreds after that.

Following his retirement, he became manager of St Peters Dunboyne. He managed the Meath under-20 football team from 2019 until 2020. On 10 December 2020, it was announced that he would become manager of Clogherinkoe.

== Honours ==
=== Soccer ===
- FAI Cup
  - Dundalk: 2002

AFL Div 3 North

   Dunboyne o35s - 2022

=== GAA ===
Meath Senior Football Championship: 1

  - St Peters Dunboyne - 2005
