= Brian Shelley =

Irish footballer

Personal information
- Date of birth: 15 November 1981 (age 44)
- Place of birth: Dublin, Ireland
- Position: Centre back

Youth career
- Verona F.C.
- Cherry Orchard

Senior career*
| Years | Team | Apps | (Gls) |
| 1999–2000 | Shamrock Rovers | 0 | (0) |
| 2000–2002 | Bohemians | 27 | (0) |
| 2002 | Longford Town | 2 | (0) |
| 2002–2005 | Carlisle United | 87 | (1) |
| 2005 | Shamrock Rovers | 15 | (0) |
| 2005–2009 | Drogheda United | 83 | (2) |
| 2009–2010 | Bohemians | 68 | (1) |
| 2011–2012 | Ballarat Red Devils | 21 | (1) |
| 2012–2015 | Waitakere United | 48 | (3) |
| 2015–2017 | Western Springs | | |
| 2018–2019 | Uni-Mount Bohemian | | |

International career
| 2001 | Republic of Ireland U21 | 4 | (0) |

Managerial career
- 2011–2012: Ballarat Red Devils
- 2012–2014: Waitakere United (assistant)
- 2014–2015: Waitakere United
- 2017: Western Springs (assistant)
- 2018–2020: Uni-Mount Bohemian
- 2024: Eastern Suburbs (assistant)
- 2025–: Auckland FC Reserves (assistant)
- * Club domestic league appearances and goals

Brian Shelley (born 15 November 1981) is an Irish former football player who currently serves as assistant manager for New Zealand National League side Auckland FC Reserves. Besides the Republic of Ireland, he has played in New Zealand.

He began his career at Shamrock Rovers but moved to rivals Bohemians in 2000. He made his first team debut for the club as substitute in the UEFA Cup tie against 1. FC Kaiserslautern in September 2000. After a short spell with Longford Town, Roddy Collins brought him along with teammate Trevor Molloy to Carlisle United in time for the 2002/03 season. He scored his first and only goal for Carlisle in a 2–1 defeat to Leyton Orient on 28 December 2002.

He returned to Ireland during the 2005 season with Shamrock Rovers, making his debut on 18 March and went on to make 17 total appearances.

Having helped Drogheda to the club's first ever League of Ireland title in November 2007, he was named PFAI Player of the Year on 18 November 2007. However, the following season wasn't as successful as Drogheda finished well off the pace in the League and the club went into meltdown due to financial problems.

Brian left Drogheda in January 2009 and returned to Dalymount Park for a 2nd spell with Bohemians. He has a made a fine start with the club and his form was rewarded with the Soccer Writer's Association Player of the Month for August. During this month, he scored his first goal of the season against Galway United at Dalymount Park. He then added to his collection of medals on 26 September as Bohs beat Waterford United in the final of the League of Ireland Cup. And he wasn't done yet as a great run of form towards the end of the season helped Brian to his third League of Ireland Premier Division winners medal, winning by 4 points from closest rivals Shamrock Rovers. His outstanding performances throughout the season was noted by his fellow professionals when he was voted on to the PFAI Team of the Year.

== Honours ==
Bohemians

- League of Ireland: 2000–01, 2009
- FAI Cup: 2001
- League of Ireland Cup: 2009
- Setanta Sports Cup: 2009–10

Carlisle United

- Football League Trophy runner-up: 2002–03

Drogheda United

- League of Ireland: 2007
- Setanta Sports Cup: 2006, 2007

Individual

- PFAI Players' Player of the Year: 2007
