= John Burns (Irish footballer) =

Irish former professional footballer

Personal information
- Full name: John Christopher Burns
- Date of birth: 4 December 1977 (age 48)
- Place of birth: Dublin, Republic of Ireland
- Position: Midfielder

Youth career
- Belvedere

Senior career*
Years	Team	Apps	(Gls)
1994–1999	Nottingham Forest	4	(0)
1999–2002	Bristol City	11	(0)
2001–2002	→ Shelbourne (loan)	8	(4)
2002–2003	Carlisle United	5	(0)
2002–2003	Burton Albion	8	(0)
2002–2003	Hucknall Town		
2003–2004	Ilkeston Town		
2003–2005	Hinckley United		

International career
- Republic of Ireland U21
- * Club domestic league appearances and goals

John Burns (born 4 December 1977) is an Irish former professional footballer who played as a midfielder in the Football League for Nottingham Forest, Bristol City, Carlisle United and Burton Albion. Burns later played non-league football for Hucknall Town, Ilkeston Town before ending his career with Hinckley United.

== Club career ==
Burns started his career at Belvedere before joining Forest as a sixteen-year-old in 1994. Touted as "The next Roy Keane", he stayed with Forest for the next four years, making his debut on 4 September 1999 in a league match against Walsall. Despite this, Burns was not able to hold down a regular first team place and made just four appearances for the club.

Following his spell at Forest, John was transferred to Bristol City in November 1999 as part of the deal that saw Jim Brennan move in the opposite direction, with a valuation in the transfer reported as approximately 100k. Burns saw little playing time at City, making just eleven league appearances and spending six months on loan at Shelbourne in Ireland. In November 2001 Burns agreed to terminate his contract with Bristol City, having not featured in the league since the end of the 1999–2000 season.

After leaving Bristol, John signed for Carlisle United on 9 August 2002 on a monthlong contract. Despite making five appearances including four starts, his contract was not extended and Burns was released.

John then moved to Burton Albion, making his debut against Farnborough Town on 30 October 2002.

== International career ==
Whilst at Nottingham Forest, Burns was called up to the Republic of Ireland under-21 national football team, having previously represented his country at Under-16, Under-17 and Under-20 level.

Burns was voted U 18 FAI Young Player of the Year in 1996. Burns was also voted Young Player of the Year for Nottingham Forest in the same year.

== Honours ==
Republic of Ireland

- FIFA World Youth Championship Third Place: 1997

== Post-Football Activity ==
After leaving Football John formed a band called The Establishment, enlisting the help of the PFA who agreed to fund the production of the band's first EP in June 2008 as part of its programme to help former players start new careers. The Band is managed by former footballer Dion Dublin.
