= Philip Byrne =

Irish football player

Phil Byrne
Personal information
- Full name: Philip Byrne
- Date of birth: 6 April 1982 (age 44)
- Place of birth: Dublin, Ireland
- Position: Centre back

Youth career
- Belvedere
- Shelbourne

Senior career*
Years	Team	Apps	(Gls)
2001–2004	Shelbourne	2	(0)
2004–2007	Kildare County	124	(1)
2008–2009	Sporting Fingal	41	(3)
2010	Longford Town	12	(0)
2011	Monaghan United	11	(1)
2012	Carrick Rangers	4	(1)
Total		194	(6)
- * Club domestic league appearances and goals

Philip Byrne (born 6 April 1982 in Dublin) is an Irish former footballer.

In 2004, Byrne was signed by then Kildare County manager Eric Hannigan from Shelbourne. He has been a dependable fixture at the centre of the Kildare County defence for both Hannigan and current manager Ryan. Philip was awarded the Supporters Club Player of the Year in his debut season for the club in 2004. He was selected as Kildare County's captain for the 2007 season. He picked up a special award for his 100th appearance in April 2007 before Kildare's League Match versus Finn Harps. He left the club after four years at the end of the 2007 season signing for newly formed Sporting Fingal. In January 2010, Byrne joined Longford Town where he was club captain for the 2010 season before being released at the season's end.

In January 2012 he signed for Carrick Rangers .

== Personal life ==
His father Damien Byrne was also a League of Ireland player.
