= Gerry Crossley =

Irish footballer (born 1980)

Personal information
- Full name: Gerard Michael Crossley
- Date of birth: 5 February 1980 (age 46)
- Place of birth: Belfast, Ireland
- Height: 5 ft 7 in (1.70 m)
- Position: Midfielder

Youth career
- Rosario
- 1994–1996: Celtic Boys Club
- 1996–1999: Celtic

Senior career*
Years	Team	Apps	(Gls)
1999–2000	Hamilton Academical	17	(1)
2000–2001	Galway United	43	(2)
2001	Shelbourne	1	(0)
2002–2005	Cliftonville	26	(3)
2006–2007	Larne	8	(0)

International career
1995	Northern Ireland U15		
- Republic of Ireland U16
- Republic of Ireland U18
1999	Republic of Ireland U20		
2000	Republic of Ireland U21	1	(0)
- * Club domestic league appearances and goals

Gerard Michael Crossley (born 5 February 1980) is an Irish football coach and former player.

== Club career ==
=== Celtic ===
Crossley joined Celtic at youth level and made a first team debut in May 1996, as a substitute in Celtic's 3–0 defeat by a Republic of Ireland XI in Mick McCarthy's testimonial match at Lansdowne Road, Dublin.

In November 1998 Crossley was an unused substitute in Celtic's 4–2 defeat by FC Zürich at Letzigrund in the 1998–99 UEFA Cup second round. He was among 11 young players to be released by the club in May 1999.

=== Hamilton Academical ===
Crossley spent preseason training with Derby County, then signed a one-month contract with Grimsby Town on 4 August 1999. In October 1999 Crossley returned to Scotland to join Hamilton Academical. He made 17 appearances in the 1999–2000 Scottish Second Division, scoring one goal.

In April 2000 the Hamilton players voted to strike over unpaid wages, failing to fulfil a fixture at Stenhousemuir which incurred a 15-point deduction and ensured relegation to the Scottish Football League Third Division. Crossley left the club in a subsequent player "exodus".

=== Galway United ===
In July 2000 Crossley agreed a two-year contract with Galway United of the League of Ireland Premier Division. Coach Don O'Riordan enthused: "Ger's a player of immense calibre".

=== Cliftonville ===
Crossley was ruled out for at least six months with a back injury in June 2003. In July 2004 Crossley broke his leg in a pre-season game while attempting to come back after missing 18 months with the previous injury.

== International career ==
=== Youth ===
==== Northern Ireland ====
In 1995 while attending De La Salle College, Belfast, Crossley made 11 appearances for the Northern Ireland national schoolboy team, including at the Victory Shield.

==== Republic of Ireland ====
Crossley switched to playing for the Republic of Ireland and featured at the 1996 UEFA European Under-16 Championship. He became a valued player in Brian Kerr's national youth teams which won the 1998 edition of the UEFA European Under-18 Championship and finished third in 1999.

He also played at the 1999 FIFA World Youth Championship in Nigeria and won one cap for the Republic of Ireland national under-21 football team in April 2000.

=== Senior ===
In May 1998 Crossley was selected by Mick McCarthy in the senior Republic of Ireland squad for a home friendly against Mexico, but did not participate in the match. He did make a substitute appearance for Ireland in Paul McGrath's testimonial against a Jack Charlton XI on 16 May 1998.

== Coaching career ==
When Marty Tabb was named the new manager of Donegal Celtic in June 2010, he appointed Crossley and Frankie Wilson to his coaching team. All three departed when Tabb was sacked 74 days later.

Crossley served as Wilson's assistant manager at Bangor from September 2010 and the pair guided the County Down club to the Steel & Sons Cup in December 2011. When both left by mutual consent in January 2013, the club also released their playing registrations.

In 2022 Crossley was the coach of St Oliver Plunkett FC's women's team.

== Personal life ==
Crossley's brother Jim was murdered by his partner in a domestic violence incident in 2022.
