= Tony Cousins =

Irish football coach and former player

Personal information
- Full name: Anthony Cousins
- Date of birth: 25 August 1969 (age 57)
- Place of birth: Dublin, Ireland
- Position: Forward

Team information
- Current team: Shamrock Rovers U17s (head coach)

Youth career
- Belvedere
- 1985–1987: Chelsea

Senior career*
Years	Team	Apps	(Gls)
1988	Middlesbrough	0	(0)
1988–1990	Dundalk	?	(20)
1990–1993	Liverpool	0	(0)
1992–1993	Hereford United	3	(0)
1993–1996	Bohemians	82	(21)
1996–2002	Shamrock Rovers	145	(46)
2002–2003	Bray Wanderers	0	(0)

International career
1988	Republic of Ireland U19	1	(0)
1989–1992	Republic of Ireland U21	6	(4)
1997–1999	League of Ireland XI	2	(1)

Managerial career
- 2006–2008: Galway United
- 2008: Kildare County
- 2009–2016: Longford Town
- 2019–: Shamrock Rovers U17s
- * Club domestic league appearances and goals

Tony Cousins (born 25 August 1969) is an Irish football coach and former player. He is head coach of Shamrock Rovers U17s.

Cousins was involved in full-time football from the age of sixteen when he joined English club Chelsea, where he spent two years. Throughout his career he played for Dundalk, Liverpool, Hereford United, Middlesbrough, Bohemians, Shamrock Rovers and Bray Wanderers.

He is the first cousin of Tommy Dunne.

== Playing career ==
He made his League of Ireland debut for Dundalk at Waterford on 25 September 1988. After two years at Oriel Park, during which he shared the PFAI Young Player of the Year Award in 1989/90, he signed for Liverpool. Due to injury he failed to make a single first team appearance before getting a free transfer to Middlesbrough at the end of the 1992/93 season. After 3 appearances for Hereford he came home to sign for Bohemians where he scored 22 goals in 83 league games over three seasons.

He signed for Shamrock Rovers in the summer of 1996, making his debut in a preseason friendly against Heart of Midlothian. His first of many goals for the Hoops came in a friendly win against Crewe Alexandra. Three weeks later, he scored his first competitive goal in a 2–2 draw against Shelbourne in the League of Ireland Cup. His first league goal came against Bray Wanderers on 13 September 1996.

In his first season with Shamrock Rovers he was the joint top goalscorer in the League of Ireland Premier Division, winning Player of the Month in February 1997. The following season, he was the team's top goalscorer with 15 league goals. During the six years he played with Rovers he scored 46 goals in 145 league appearances and a total of 65 goals in 190 appearances, including one goal in two appearances in European competition.

Having completed his time with Shamrock Rovers, he spent one season with Bray Wanderers before retiring. Cousins was capped six times by the Irish Under 21 team at the start of his career, scoring four goals.

== Coaching career ==
Tony Cousins was appointed U-21 coach at Shamrock Rovers before becoming assistant to Liam Buckley in 2003. In February 2005, he was appointed assistant coach at Drogheda United. He became coach of Galway United in 2006, where he stayed for two seasons. He was removed from his position in March 2008, following a home defeat to Shamrock Rovers. He replaced John Ryan as coach of Kildare County on 24 October 2008 for the remainder of the 2008 season.

Tony Cousins was appointed Longford Town manager in December 2009. He resigned as manager in August 2016 after 209 league games in charge.

In his time at the club, Cousins improved the side's fortunes each season as the Town finished 9th, 6th, 3rd and 2nd in his first four seasons in the First Division. This period included promotion play-off defeats to Waterford United and Bray Wanderers in successive seasons.

In his 5th season in charge, Cousins eventually led the Town to their first ever league title in senior football as they were crowned 2014 First Division champions. A memorable 5–0 home victory against Shamrock Rovers B, before over 2000 spectators, secured the title.

The 2015 season saw the Town back in the top flight of Irish football for the first time since 2007. Cousins led the side to a highly commendable 6th-place finish and an FAI Cup semi-final appearance. The following season proved more difficult however as Longford sat rooted to the bottom of the division before Cousins' decision to step down on 13 August 2016.
