= 2007 League of Ireland Cup =

2007 iteration of Irish football competition

Tournament details
- Country: Ireland

The League of Ireland Cup 2007 was the 34th staging of the League of Ireland Cup.

The 2007 League Cup kicked off in April. Two non-league clubs (Fanad United and Kerry League) joined the 22 league clubs in the draw. There were sixteen clubs drawn to face each other in the first round, with the other eight given byes to the second round.

== First round ==
Matches played between 1 April and 16 April 2007.

Tie no	Home team	Score	Away team
1	Finn Harps	2–0	Fanad United
2	Athlone Town	1–1	Longford Town
Athlone Town won 5–4 on penalties
3	Waterford United	3–0	Wexford Youths
4	Cobh Ramblers	3–0	Limerick 37
5	Monaghan United	2–4	Galway United
6	Shamrock Rovers	1–0	Dundalk
7	Bohemians	3–1	Bray Wanderers
8	Kildare County	0–0	UCD
UCD won 4–2 on penalties

== Second round ==
Matches played on 5 May and 8 May 2007.

Tie no	Home team	Score	Away team
1	Finn Harps	3–2	Sligo Rovers
2	Kerry League	1–1	Cork City Football Club
Cork City won 4–3 on penalties
3	St Patrick's Athletic	0–1	UCD
4	Athlone Town	1–1	Kilkenny City
Athlone Town won 4–3 on penalties
5	Cobh Ramblers	2–1	Waterford United
6	Derry City	2–1	Galway United
7	Drogheda United	0–3	Shamrock Rovers
8	Shelbourne	0–2	Bohemians

== Quarter-finals ==
Matches played on 2 July and 3 July 2007.

Tie no	Home team	Score	Away team
1	UCD	2–1	Finn Harps
2	Bohemians	3–2	Cork City
3	Cobh Ramblers	1–2	Derry City
4	Shamrock Rovers	1–0	Athlone Town

== Semi-finals ==
Matches played on 7 August and 28 August 2007.

2007-08-07

Bohemians	1–0	Shamrock Rovers
Crowe 59'	(report)

Dalymount Park, Dublin

2007-08-28

Derry City	3–0	UCD
Martyn 53'; McHugh 66'; McCourt 83'	(report)

The Brandywell, Derry City
Referee: David McKeon

== Final ==
2007-10-09
20:00

Derry City	1–0 (a.e.t)	Bohemians
McHugh 97'	(report)

The Brandywell, Derry City
Attendance: 7,700
Referee: D Hanney (Dublin).

League of Ireland Cup Winner 2007

Derry City
8th Title
