= 2002–03 League of Ireland First Division =

League of Ireland First Division
- Season: 2002–03
- Champions: Waterford United
- Top goalscorer: Kevin McHugh: 14 (Finn Harps); Willie Bruton: 14 (Cobh Ramblers)

The 2002–03 League of Ireland First Division season was the 18th season of the League of Ireland First Division. The First Division was contested by 12 teams. Waterford United won the title while Finn Harps won the First Division Cup, a one-off tournament staged this season.

Kildare County were elected to replace St. Francis.

== Overview ==
=== First Division Cup ===
Between July and August the 12 teams competed in the First Division Cup. The teams were divided into two regionalised groups and played a single round of games. The two group winners then qualified for the final. On 6 July 2002 Kildare County, the First Division's newest members, made their competitive debut against Limerick at Station Road. Philip Gorman and Shey Zellor scored for County as they won 2–0. County went on to win their regional group and qualify for the final but lost 4–0 on aggregate to Finn Harps.

==== Final tables ====
Southern section

Pos	Team	Pld	W	D	L	GF	GA	GD	Pts	Qualification
1	Kildare County	5	4	1	0	9	1	+8	13	Qualified for final (Note: Kildare County replaced Fingal–St. Francis.)
2	Limerick	5	4	0	1	10	8	+2	12	
3	Cobh Ramblers	5	2	1	2	5	5	0	7	
4	Waterford United	5	1	1	3	5	6	−1	4	
5	Kilkenny City	5	1	1	3	6	10	−4	4	
6	Athlone Town	5	0	2	3	4	9	−5	2	

Notes:

Northern section

Pos	Team	Pld	W	D	L	GF	GA	GD	Pts	Qualification
1	Finn Harps	5	3	2	0	10	5	+5	11	Qualified for final
2	Sligo Rovers	5	3	2	0	8	3	+5	11	
3	Monaghan United	5	2	1	2	6	5	+1	7	
4	Dublin City	5	2	0	3	5	5	0	6	
5	Dundalk	5	1	1	3	3	6	−3	4	
6	Galway United	5	0	2	3	2	10	−8	2	

==== Final ====
28 August 2002	Kildare County	0–2	Finn Harps	Station Road
			Jonathan Minnick 55'; Neil Lloyd 67'

4 September 2002	Finn Harps	2–0	Kildare County	Finn Park
	Bradley 16'; Bonner 34'

Finn Harps win 4–0 on aggregate.

=== Regular season ===
The regular season began in August and concluded in January. It used a round-robin format which saw each team play 22 games. Under manager Jimmy McGeough and with a team that included Dan Connor, Waterford United won the title and were automatically promoted to the 2003 Premier Division.

==== Final table ====
Pos	Team	Pld	W	D	L	GF	GA	GD	Pts	Promotion or qualification
1	Waterford United	22	13	7	2	37	25	+12	46	Promoted to Premier Division
2	Finn Harps	22	12	5	5	41	22	+19	41	Lost promotion/relegation play-off
3	Galway United	22	10	6	6	34	21	+13	36	Lost promotion/relegation play-off
4	Cobh Ramblers	22	10	5	7	39	38	+1	35	Lost promotion/relegation play-off
5	Kildare County	22	9	6	7	32	31	+1	33	
6	Sligo Rovers	22	8	6	8	28	27	+1	30	
7	Dublin City	22	8	4	10	36	35	+1	28	
8	Monaghan United	22	5	11	6	26	27	−1	26	
9	Dundalk	22	5	8	9	28	36	−8	23	
10	Limerick	22	6	5	11	26	36	−10	23	
11	Athlone Town	22	5	6	11	26	40	−14	21	
12	Kilkenny City	22	3	7	12	23	38	−15	16	

=== Promotion/relegation play-off ===
The promotion/relegation play-off format was changed this season. It now featured four teams, the second, third and fourth placed teams from the First Division plus Drogheda United, the ninth placed team from the 2002–03 League of Ireland Premier Division.

==== Semi-finals ====
1st Legs

29 January 2003	Galway United	2–0	Finn Harps

29 January 2003	Cobh Ramblers	2–2	Drogheda United

2nd Legs

1 February 2003	Finn Harps	1–0	Galway United

Galway United win 2–1 on aggregate

1 February 2003	Drogheda United	2–0	Cobh Ramblers

Drogheda United win 4–2 on aggregate

==== Final ====
5 February 2003	Galway United	2–0	Drogheda United

8 February 2003	Drogheda United	3–0 (a.e.t.)	Galway United
		Report

Drogheda United win 3–2 on aggregate and retain their place in the Premier Division.

Locations of the First Division teams

== See also ==
- 2002–03 League of Ireland Premier Division
