= Sean Hargan =

Northern Irish footballer (born 1974)

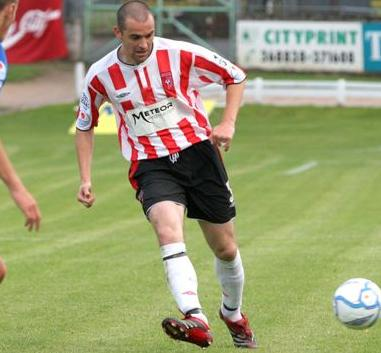

Personal information
- Date of birth: 6 November 1974 (age 51)
- Place of birth: Derry, Northern Ireland
- Position: Left-back

Senior career*
Years	Team	Apps	(Gls)
1995–2008	Derry City	415	(56)
2008–2009	Crusaders	18	(0)
Total		433	(56)
- * Club domestic league appearances and goals

Sean Hargan (born 6 November 1974) is a Northern Irish former professional footballer who played as a left-back. Known for his long association with Derry City, Hargan was a key member of the Derry City's 1996–97 league-winning side, and played a pivotal role in the club's wider success over the years, winning the FAI Cup in 2002 and 2006, and five League of Ireland Cups in 1999, 2005, 2006, 2007, 2008. His commitment and leadership on the pitch earned him a testimonial year in 2005, recognising his outstanding service to the club. He had a brief spell at Crusaders before retiring at the end of the 2009 season.

Hargan is renowned for scoring the winning goal against two-time UEFA Cup winners IFK Gothenburg in the 2006 UEFA Cup, securing a famous 1-0 underdog win for Derry City in Sweden. This goal helped spark a memorable European campaign for the Candystripes, which culminated in an eventual group stage play-off tie against French giants Paris Saint-Germain. To this day, it remains one of the clubs most notable goals.

== Derry City ==
As a young man, Sean played for Top of the Hill Celtic in the Derry and District League. As he developed, he broke into the Derry City team in the position of striker and scored a hat trick on his debut against Galway United. Hargan later converted to left back, where he offered unwavering commitment to the side, endearing him to the City supporters. Hargan has scored more than 50 competitive goals for the Candystripes, including the decisive header away to IFK Gothenburg in the 2006 UEFA Cup qualifying round; which remains the clubs most iconic moment in European competition. Also during the 2006 league season, Derry City escaped punishment for fielding a banned Hargan due to the league failing informing Derry City in the correct timeframe.

After Derry's City's European experience which included memorable ties with Gretna and PSG, Shelbourne were reported to have shown interest in the left back, but Hargan pledged his loyalty and stayed with the Candystripes until the end of the 2008 season. With the signing of Dave Rogers at the beginning of the 2007 season, Hargan's first-team place came under stiff competition. Nevertheless, due to his senior status in the team, he was handed the role of vice-captain to Peter Hutton by Pat Fenlon for the season and Hargan seen off the completion of Rogers until he sustained an injury that would keep him out for the rest of the season.

Hargan was described as a loyal servant for the club, and by the end of the 2008 season, he had made a total of 415 appearances for Derry City - making him the club's third highest appearer ever.

He signed for a Crusaders at the end of the 2008 season, after departing the Brandywell club after 13 years at the club.

Hargan won eight major honours during his 13-year career at Derry City, including the 1996–97 League of Ireland Premier Division title, the FAI Cup in 2002 and 2006, and five League of Ireland Cups in 1995, 2005, 2006, 2007, and 2008.

== Crusaders ==
At the end of December 2008, Irish League side Crusaders signed Hargan on an 18-month deal. Dungannon Swifts and Coleraine were also believed to be interested in the veteran full-back, but Hargan signed for the Crues and spent just under a year as his career was cut short due to injury. Hargan retired from professional football at the end of the 2009 season at the age of 37.

== Post-Retirement ==
Hargan joined former Derry City teammate Peter Hutton in Harry Gregg's testimonial match on 15 May 2012, at Windsor Park in Belfast. The match, which saw an Irish League XI take on a full-strength Manchester United side, celebrated the illustrious career of legendary goalkeeper Harry Gregg. Hargan played alongside a number of notable players, with Manchester United emerging victorious, winning 4-1 with goals from Wayne Rooney, Danny Welbeck, and others.

Hargan was appointed Assistant Coach at Derry City following the appointment of Peter Hutton as manager in 2014.

== Honours ==
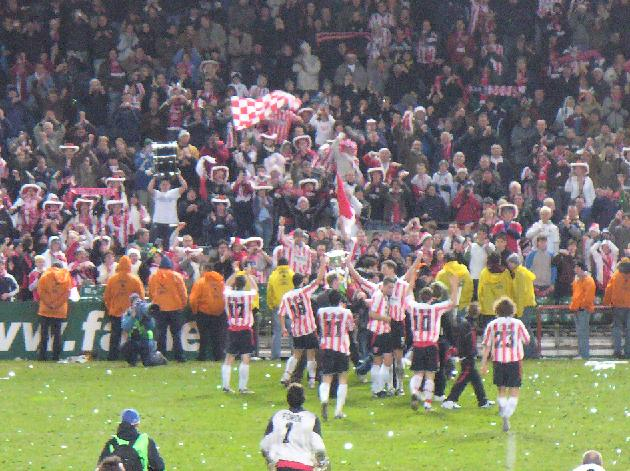
Derry City celebrate winning the 2006 FAI Cup.

Derry City

- League of Ireland Premier Division: 1996–97; (runner-up: 2005, 2006)
- FAI Cup: 2002, 2006; (runner-up: 1997, 2008)
- League of Ireland Cup: 1999, 2005, 2006, 2007, 2008
