= 2002–03 League of Ireland Premier Division =

League of Ireland Premier Division
- Season: 2002–03
- Champions: Bohemians (9th title)
- Relegated: Bray Wanderers
- UEFA Champions League: Bohemians
- UEFA Cup: Shelbourne; Derry City
- UEFA Intertoto Cup: Shamrock Rovers
- Top goalscorer: Glen Crowe: 18 (Bohemians)

The 2002–03 League of Ireland Premier Division was the 18th season of the League of Ireland Premier Division. The division was made up of 10 teams. Bohemians were declared champions.

== Regular season ==
The 2003 season would see the League of Ireland Premier Division change from a winter league to a summer league. To facilitate this change, the 2002–03 season was a shortened season. This saw each team play three rounds of games, totalling 27 games each.

=== Final table ===
Pos	Team	Pld	W	D	L	GF	GA	GD	Pts	Qualification or relegation
1	Bohemians (C)	27	15	9	3	47	27	+20	54	Qualification to Champions League first qualifying round
2	Shelbourne	27	15	4	8	44	26	+18	49	Qualification to UEFA Cup qualifying round
3	Shamrock Rovers	27	12	7	8	42	29	+13	43	Qualification to Intertoto Cup first round
4	Cork City	27	11	6	10	37	34	+3	39	
5	Longford Town (Note: Longford Town had 9 points deducted for fielding Avery John against Cork City, Bohemians and Bray Wanderers but this decision was revoked on appeal.)	27	8	11	8	25	29	−4	35	
6	UCD	27	8	9	10	23	25	−2	33	
7	St Patrick's Athletic	27	8	9	10	27	33	−6	33	
8	Derry City	27	8	7	12	31	37	−6	31	Qualification to UEFA Cup qualifying round (Note: Derry City qualified for the UEFA Cup qualifying round after winning the 2002–03 FAI Cup.)
9	Drogheda United (O)	27	8	6	13	26	40	−14	30	Qualification to Relegation play-off
10	Bray Wanderers (R)	27	4	8	15	31	53	−22	20	Relegation to League of Ireland First Division

Source: www.rsssf.com
(C) Champions; (O) Play-off winners; (R) Relegated

=== Results ===
==== Matches 1–18 ====
Home \ Away	BOH	BRW	COR	DER	DRO	LON	SHM	SHE	StP	UCD
Bohemians	—	4–0	1–1	3–2	3–1	1–0	3–2	1–2	1–1	2–1
Bray Wanderers	1–1	—	2–3	3–3	3–2	2–2	1–1	1–5	0–0	0–0
Cork City	1–1	3–0	—	3–1	1–0	1–1	3–2	3–0	2–0	3–2
Derry City	0–3	3–1	0–0	—	2–1	1–1	1–2	1–0	2–0	1–0
Drogheda United	0–2	2–1	1–0	2–1	—	0–1	3–2	0–3	1–2	1–0
Longford Town	1–2	1–0	3–2	1–1	2–1	—	0–0	0–2	0–1	1–1
Shamrock Rovers	1–1	2–1	4–1	3–1	5–0	0–1	—	0–0	0–1	0–0
Shelbourne	1–2	2–1	2–1	2–0	3–3	3–0	0–1	—	1–2	2–1
St Patrick's Athletic	1–1	1–2	4–1	1–0	1–1	2–2	1–2	2–2	—	2–2
UCD	1–2	1–1	1–0	0–2	3–0	0–0	1–2	1–3	1–0	—

Legend: Blue = home team win; Yellow = draw; Red = away team win.

==== Matches 19–27 ====
Home \ Away	BOH	BRW	COR	DER	DRO	LON	SHM	SHE	StP	UCD
Bohemians	—	—	2–0	2–2	1–1	—	3–2	—	—	1–1
Bray Wanderers	1–3	—	—	1–2	0–2	2–0	—	—	—	—
Cork City	—	3–1	—	2–1	—	—	1–1	2–1	—	0–1
Derry City	—	—	—	—	—	1–1	0–0	0–1	2–0	—
Drogheda United	—	—	0–0	3–1	—	—	0–2	—	0–0	0–1
Longford Town	1–0	—	1–0	—	0–0	—	—	—	—	0–2
Shamrock Rovers	—	3–1	—	—	—	3–2	—	0–1	2–1	0–1
Shelbourne	0–1	3–1	—	—	0–1	1–1	—	—	2–0	—
St Patrick's Athletic	2–0	1–4	1–0	—	—	0–2	—	—	—	—
UCD	—	0–0	—	1–0	—	—	—	0–2	0–0	—

Legend: Blue = home team win; Yellow = draw; Red = away team win.

== Promotion/relegation play-off ==
The promotion/relegation play-off format was changed this season. It now featured four teams, the second, third and fourth placed teams from the 2002–03 League of Ireland First Division plus the ninth placed team from the Premier Division.

=== Semi-final ===
1st Legs

29 January 2003	Galway United	2–0	Finn Harps

29 January 2003	Cobh Ramblers	2–2	Drogheda United

2nd Legs

1 February 2003	Finn Harps	1–0	Galway United

Galway United win 2–1 on aggregate

1 February 2003	Drogheda United	2–0	Cobh Ramblers

Drogheda United win 4–2 on aggregate

=== Final ===
5 February 2003	Galway United	2–0	Drogheda United

8 February 2003	Drogheda United	3–0	Galway United

Drogheda United win 3–2 on aggregate and retain their place in the Premier Division.

Locations of the Premier Division teams

== See also ==
- 2002–03 Shelbourne F.C. season
- 2002–03 League of Ireland First Division
