= Kildare County F.C. =

- Full name: Kildare County Football Club
- Nickname: The Thoroughbreds
- Founded: 2002
- Dissolved: 2009
- Ground: Station Road
- League: League of Ireland First Division; League of Ireland U21 Division
Home colours	Away colours

Kildare County F.C. was an Irish association football club based in Newbridge, County Kildare. Between 2002–03 and 2009 they played in the League of Ireland First Division. During this time they also entered a team in the League of Ireland U21 Division.

== History ==
=== Foundation ===
Kildare County Football Club was formed in 2002 by members of Newbridge Town F.C. in order to enter a team in the League of Ireland. After St Francis withdrew from the league's First Division just two weeks before the start of the 2001–02 season, the League of Ireland began to look for a replacement club for the following season. Twelve clubs, including Newbridge Town, were approached to see if they were interested in joining the First Division. Members of Newbridge Town met with both the Kildare Junior League and Kildare Schoolboy League and subsequently decided to form Kildare County as a separate legal entity. The name Kildare County was chosen in an attempt to attract potential sponsors, players and supporters from throughout County Kildare. The new club applied to join the First Division and in February 2002 it was announced that Kildare County would be offered the 2002–03 First Division place ahead of Mullingar Town.

=== Early seasons ===
In March 2002 Kildare County appointed Dermot Keely as their first manager and John Gill as his assistant. On 15 June 2002 the club made their official debut in a friendly against Bray Wanderers. The game finished 2–2 with Keith O'Connor and Alan Kelly becoming the first and second players to score for County. On 6 July 2002 Kildare County made their competitive debut against Limerick at Station Road in a First Division Cup game. Philip Gorman and Shey Zellor scored for County as they won 2–0. On 24 August County made their League of Ireland First Division debut at Station Road again against Limerick. This time they lost 3–1 with Philip Gorman scoring the club's first league goal. Dermot Keely remained in charge of County for the 2002–03 season, guiding them to fifth place. In July 2003, midway through the 2003 season, Keely resigned as County manager in order to take charge of Derry City. During their first three seasons in the League of Ireland First Division, Kildare County challenged for promotion to the League of Ireland Premier Division and on each occasion finished just outside the qualifying places for the promotion play-offs. In the 2002–03 First Division Cup they won their regional group and finished as overall runners up, losing 4–0 on aggregate in the final to Finn Harps. They were also quarter-finalists in both the 2003 and 2004 FAI Cups.

=== Decline ===
Supporters club logo

Between 2005 and 2009, Kildare County finished in the bottom half of League of Ireland First Division table every season. In 2008 Kildare County finished bottom of the table and were initially relegated to the A Championship after losing the promotion/relegation play-off to Mervue United. However they subsequently gained a reprieve after Cobh Ramblers were refused a First Division license and were relegated directly from the 2008 Premier Division to the A Championship. In 2009 Kildare County again finished bottom of the table and they subsequently withdrew from the league. The last fixture the club played was against Shelbourne on Saturday, 7 November 2009. In the week before the game the entire club board and the team manager Joe Somerville resigned, leaving the club's players unpaid. The players were owed a total of €21,650 and as a result were reluctant to take to the pitch. However Stephen McGuinness, the general secretary of the PFAI, persuaded the players to participate in the game. Meanwhile, fans had to run the ticket sales and canteen. County lost 5–1 and after fulfilling this last game, it was officially over. County were due to play Salthill Devon in a promotion/relegation play-off but as a result of their resignation this did not happen and Salthill Devon subsequently replaced Kildare County in the 2010 First Division.

=== U21 Division ===
In addition to playing in the League of Ireland First Division, Kildare County also entered a team in the League of Ireland U21 Division. In 2006, with a team managed by Thomas Donnelly, they reached the Enda McGuill Cup final, losing 1–0 to Cork City in the final.

== League placings ==
Chart of yearly table positions for Kildare County in League of Ireland

Season	Points Total	Position
2002–03	33	5th
2003	55	5th
2004	62	4th
2005	41	8th
2006	43	7th
2007	39	7th
2008	26	10th
2009	15	12th

== Notable players ==
League of Ireland XI representative

- (Republic of Ireland) Ger O'Brien

Republic of Ireland U23 internationals

- (Republic of Ireland) Ger O'Brien

Republic of Ireland U21 internationals

- (Republic of Ireland) Pádraig Amond
- (Republic of Ireland) Thomas Morgan
- (Republic of Ireland) Richie Purdy

Republic of Ireland U17 internationals

- (Republic of Ireland) Alan Keely
- (Republic of Ireland) Marc Kenny
- (Republic of Ireland) Alan McDermott
- (Republic of Ireland) Ger Robinson

Most appearances

- (Republic of Ireland) Philip Byrne: (124)

== Managers ==
Seasons	Manager
2002–2003	Dermot Keely
2003	Eric Hannigan
2004–2008	John Ryan
2008	Tony Cousins
2009	Thomas Donnelly
2009	Joe Somerville

== Honours ==
- First Division Cup
  - Runners up: 2002–03: 1
- Enda McGuill Cup
  - Runners up: 2006: 1
