= Conor Gethins =

Irish footballer

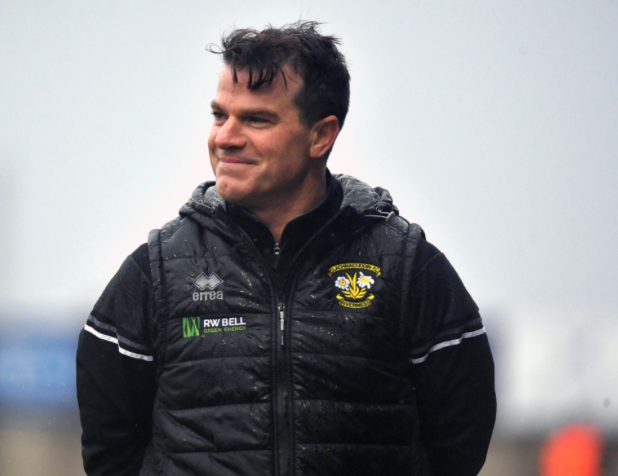
- Conor Gethins with Clachnacuddin.

Personal information
- Date of birth: 1 November 1983 (age 42)
- Place of birth: Lifford, Ireland
- Position: Forward

Team information
- Current team: Clachnacuddin (player-manager)

Youth career
- 1999–2001: Lifford Celtic

Senior career*
Years	Team	Apps	(Gls)
2001–2005	Ross County	60	(16)
2004–2005	→ Stirling Albion (loan)	12	(2)
2005	Forfar Athletic	1	(0)
2005–2010	Finn Harps	115	(67)
2006	→ Galway United (loan)	15	(9)
2010–2011	Peterhead	39	(6)
2011–2016	Nairn County	178	(173)
2016–2021	Formartine United	103	(43)
2021–2023	Nairn County	69	(36)
2023–	Clachnacuddin	6	(1)
Total		598	(355)

International career
2002	Republic of Ireland U19	1	(0)

Managerial career
- 2023: Nairn County
- 2023–: Clachnacuddin
- * Club domestic league appearances and goals

Conor Gethins (born 1 November 1983) is an Irish football manager and former player who is the manager at Scottish Highland Football League club Clachnacuddin.

== Career ==
Born in Lifford, Ireland, Gethins started his professional career with Ross County in the Scottish Football League before returning to his native Ireland in 2005 after a loan spell with Stirling Albion. Gethins played for Finn Harps in the League of Ireland, with a brief loan spell at Galway United, before returning to Scottish football in 2010 with Peterhead. He signed for Nairn County in 2011 and was voted Highland League Player of the Year and top scorer for 2012–13.

On 1 June 2016 Gethins joined Formartine United, on a two-year contract. At the end of the 2020–21 season, Gethins was released from Formartine and rejoined previous club Nairn County on a one-year contract. On 23 October 2023, Nairn County released a statement which confirmed that Gethins had left the club to take over as new manager of Clachnacuddin.
