= Station Road, Newbridge =

Football ground in Newbridge, County Kildare, Ireland

Station Road
- Bóthar an Stáisiúin
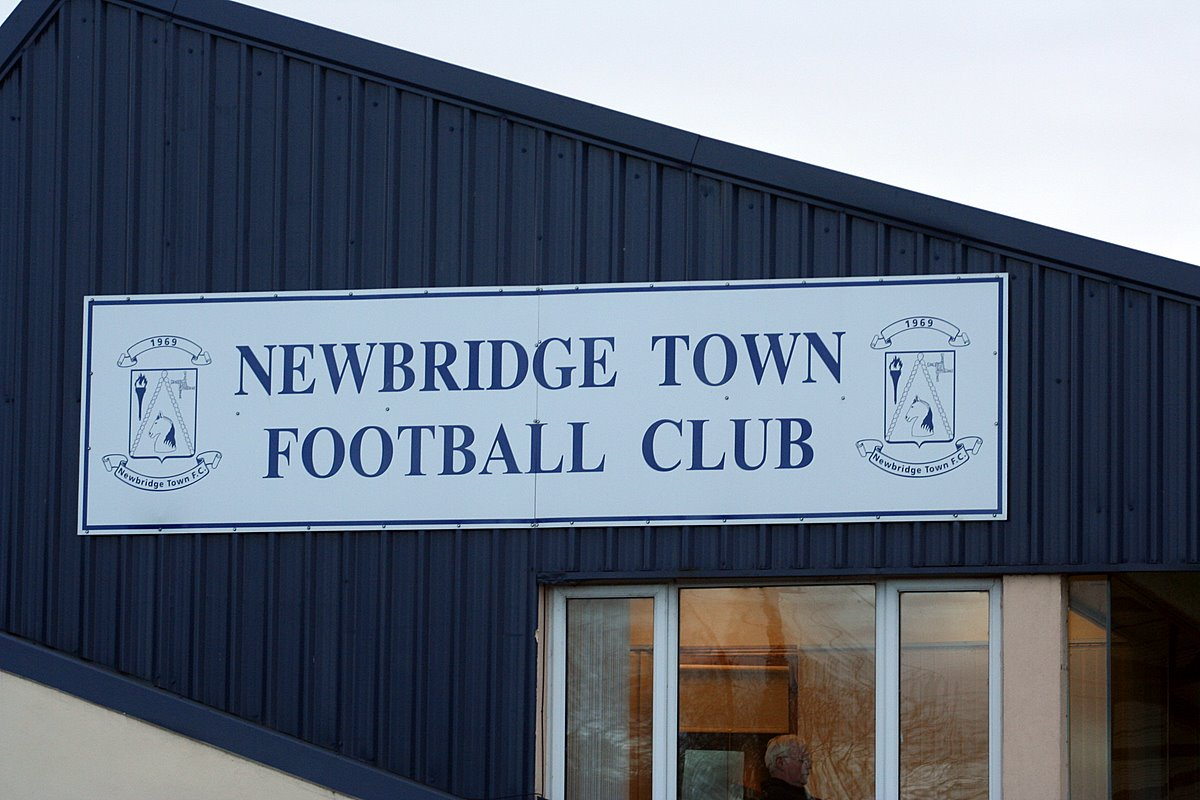
- Newbridge Town F.C. signage at the ground

- Location within Ireland
- Location: Newbridge, County Kildare; W12 PW89; Ireland
- Coordinates: 53.18508°N 6.81068°W
- Capacity: 2,180 (250 seats)
- Field size: 110 x 72 yards (101 x 66 metres)
- Public transit: Newbridge railway station

Construction
- Built: 1980s
- Opened: 30 June 1985

Tenants
- Newbridge Town F.C. (1985–present); Kildare County F.C. (2002–2009)

Station Road is an association football stadium and training complex in Newbridge, County Kildare, Ireland. It is the home ground of Newbridge Town F.C. and formerly hosted League of Ireland club Kildare County F.C. from 2002 until the club’s dissolution in 2009. Following Newbridge Town’s admission to the FAI National League, the stadium is expected to once again host nationwide league football.

The venue is also home to Newbridge Town's women and over-35 teams.

== History ==
The ground was bought by Newbridge Town in 1980 and opened in 1985. The club developed Station Road into a multi-purpose facility that includes a sports hall and two all-weather pitches. The sports hall is located on the ground floor of the clubhouse, which also contains a bar and the dressing rooms for the main pitch. The first floor contains a gym, corporate area and offices. There are also training facilities, showers and dressing rooms. The ground itself is located beside Newbridge railway station and hence was named Station Road.

When Kildare County F.C. was formed in 2002, Station Road became the club's home ground. At the time, the stadium had no terracing or stands and an estimated capacity of 2,000. The tenancy of Kildare County saw development of a 250-seater stand and a corporate area for 70. The main stand was designed by Newbridge Town's Jimmy Fagan.

Main stand in 2007

Floodlights were also erected and the first match under the lights took place between Kildare County and Monaghan United on 9 November 2002. There were plans for the construction of a new 1,100-seat stand. However, two separate 300-seat uncovered stands were erected on the Milltown side of the ground in August 2008 instead. Further upgrade work including turnstiles, realigning and lengthening of the pitch to 95 metres as well as the erection of screen fencing at the rear of the town goals, additional security monitoring, the installation of lightning protection is also planned.

== Gallery ==
Stand

Stand 2

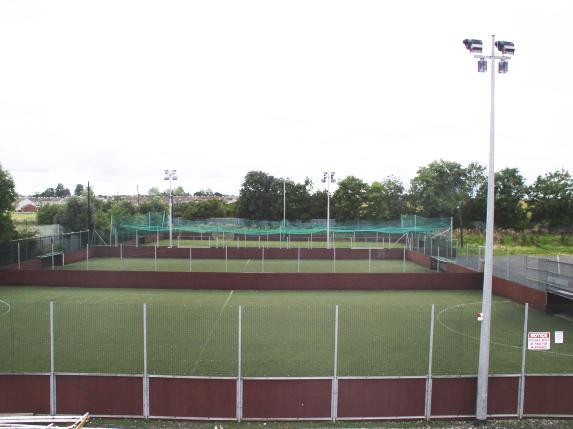
All-weather pitches
