= John Ryan (footballer, born 1968) =

Irish footballer and manager

Personal information
- Date of birth: 27 February 1968 (age 58)
- Place of birth: Dublin, Ireland
- Position: Forward

Team information
- Current team: Bray Wanderers (Coach)

Senior career*
Years	Team	Apps	(Gls)
1988	St Patrick's Athletic		
1988–1991	Bray Wanderers	65	(32)
1991–1993	St Patrick's Athletic		
1993–1996	Drogheda United		
1996–1998	Bohemians		
1998–2001	Bray Wanderers	37	(2)
2001–2002	Dundalk		(2)
2002–2003	Kildare County		(3)

Managerial career
- 2004–2008: Kildare County
- * Club domestic league appearances and goals

John Ryan (born 27 February 1968) is an Irish football manager and former player.

== Playing career ==
He made his League of Ireland debut for St Patrick's Athletic on 4 September 1988 but soon joined Bray Wanderers on loan.

He played for Bray in two different spells 1988–1991 and 1998–2001 scoring 44 goals in 145 appearances.

Ryan is probably best known for the hat-trick he scored while playing with Bray in the 1990 FAI Cup final. It was the first FAI Cup Final to be played at Lansdowne Road in 1990. That year a crowd of over 30,000 saw Bray Wanderers defeat non-league club, St Francis, 3–0. John Ryan won two FAI Cup winners medals, First Division title in 1999/2000 and two Leinster Senior Cup runners-up medals in 1988/89 & 1989/90.

John holds the club record at Bray Wanderers for most league goals in a season when he scored 16 goals in the 1989/90 season. He also shares the record of most goals scored in a season in all competitions: 20 goals. John set the record originally in the 1988–89 season before Kieran O'Brien equalled it in the 1995–96 season. John Ryan is Bray Wanderers fifth highest goalscorer of all time.

In February 1991 Ryan moved back to Pats where he stayed until August 1993 when he signed for Drogheda United. He was part of the Dundalk squad that won the 2002 FAI Cup.

Ryan signed for Kildare County as a player in April 2002. He became assistant manager to Eric Hannigan in 2003 having previously acted as caretaker manager for a single game after the departure of Dermot Keely and Gavin Dykes.

== Managerial career ==
In 2004 Manager John Ryan was appointed coach to the Republic Of Ireland Eircom League Under-21 squad to compete in the Four Nations semi-professional tournament in Scotland. The side was managed by Bray Wanderers manager Pat Devlin. Frank O'Neill, Shelbourne's Under-21 manager was assistant manager. John Ryan was joined on the coaching staff by Stuart Ashton of Cork City.

Ryan decided to resign as Assistant Manager citing personal reasons in 2004 before being named as the club's new manager two weeks later with former teammate Barry O'Connor as assistant manager. He led Kildare County to 8th position in Division One in his first season in charge, their lowest finishing position to date. Kildare County finished in 7th under his management in 2006. He resigned as manager of Kildare with four games remaining in the 2008 season having been at the club from its very beginning in 2002.

John took over as Manager of LSL Side St Mochtas in December 2008 with Mochtas struggling in the 3rd Division, bottom when he took over alongside Martin Reilly.

Ryan worked as a coach at Bray.
