= 1991–92 Sheffield United F.C. season =

Sheffield United
1991–92 season
- Chairman: Reg Brealey
- Manager: Dave Bassett
- Stadium: Bramall Lane
- First Division: 9th
- FA Cup: Fifth round
- League Cup: Third round
- Full Members Cup: Second round
- Top goalscorer: Deane (12)
- Average home league attendance: 22,097

During the 1991–92 English football season, Sheffield United F.C. competed in the Football League First Division.

== Season summary ==
In the 1991–92 season, the Blades had a poor start to the season and were bottom of the table at the beginning of November with just 2 wins in their first 15 league games and were destined for relegation but from mid-January, Bassett's team went on an impressive run, losing only 2 of their next 15 league games, picking up 34 points from the possible 45 during that run which saw them rise from being relegation candidates to an impressive 9th-place finish. Their highlight of the season was doing the double over their rivals Sheffield Wednesday, who finished 3rd that season.

== Final league table ==
Pos	Team	Pld	W	D	L	GF	GA	GD	Pts	Qualification or relegation
7	Aston Villa	42	17	9	16	48	44	+4	60	Qualification for the FA Premier League
8	Nottingham Forest	42	16	11	15	60	58	+2	59	Qualification for the FA Premier League
9	Sheffield United	42	16	9	17	65	63	+2	57	Qualification for the FA Premier League
10	Crystal Palace	42	14	15	13	53	61	−8	57	Qualification for the FA Premier League
11	Queens Park Rangers	42	12	18	12	48	47	+1	54	Qualification for the FA Premier League

Source: World Football
Rules for classification: 1) Points; 2) Goal difference; 3) Goals scored

== Results ==
Sheffield United's score comes first

=== Legend ===
Win	Draw	Loss

=== Football League First Division ===
Date	Opponent	Venue	Result	Attendance	Scorers
17 August 1991	Norwich City	A	2–2	16,380	Deane, Hill
20 August 1991	West Ham United	H	1–1	21,473	Beesley
24 August 1991	Southampton	H	0–2	18,029	
28 August 1991	Coventry City	A	1–3	12,594	Bryson
31 August 1991	Crystal Palace	A	1–2	15,507	Hodges
3 September 1991	Chelsea	H	0–1	20,588	
7 September 1991	Oldham Athletic	A	1–2	15,064	Deane
14 September 1991	Everton	H	2–1	19,817	Hoyland, Bryson
17 September 1991	Notts County	H	1–3	19,375	Agana
21 September 1991	Arsenal	A	2–5	30,244	Agana, Mendonca
28 September 1991	Wimbledon	H	0–0	16,062	
5 October 1991	Leeds United	A	3–4	28,694	Hoyland, Agana, Bradshaw
19 October 1991	Nottingham Forest	H	4–2	23,080	Whitehouse, Agana, Bryson, Hoyland
26 October 1991	Manchester City	A	2–3	25,495	Gayle (2)
2 November 1991	Manchester United	A	0–2	42,942	
17 November 1991	Sheffield Wednesday	H	2–0	31,832	Whitehouse, Deane
23 November 1991	Tottenham Hotspur	A	1–0	28,168	Gage
30 November 1991	Luton Town	H	1–1	21,804	Bryson
7 December 1991	Queens Park Rangers	A	0–1	10,106	
14 December 1991	Aston Villa	H	2–0	18,401	Ward, McGrath (own goal)
21 December 1991	West Ham United	A	1–1	19,287	Deane
26 December 1991	Coventry City	H	0–3	19,638	
28 December 1991	Crystal Palace	H	1–1	17,969	Hoyland
1 January 1992	Liverpool	A	1–2	35,993	Deane
11 January 1992	Southampton	A	4–2	12,502	Ward, Lake (2), Marwood
18 January 1992	Norwich City	H	1–0	17,549	Bryson
1 February 1992	Nottingham Forest	A	5–2	22,412	Lake, Gannon, Bryson, Bradshaw, Deane
8 February 1992	Manchester City	H	4–2	25,839	Lake, Gayle, Deane, Whitehouse
22 February 1992	Luton Town	A	1–2	9,003	Bryson
29 February 1992	Queens Park Rangers	H	0–0	17,958	
11 March 1992	Sheffield Wednesday	A	3–1	40,327	Whitehouse, Davison (2)
14 March 1992	Manchester United	H	1–2	30,183	Deane
21 March 1992	Chelsea	A	2–1	11,247	Whitehouse (2)
28 March 1992	Liverpool	H	2–0	26,943	Deane (2)
31 March 1992	Aston Villa	A	1–1	15,745	Gage
4 April 1992	Oldham Athletic	H	2–0	19,843	Whitehouse, Hoyland
11 April 1992	Everton	A	2–0	17,820	Bryson, Cork
14 April 1992	Tottenham Hotspur	H	2–0	21,526	Deane (2)
18 April 1992	Arsenal	H	1–1	25,034	Davison
20 April 1992	Notts County	A	3–1	12,605	Beesley, Hodges, Davison
26 April 1992	Leeds United	H	2–3	31,084	Cork, Chapman (own goal)
2 May 1992	Wimbledon	A	0–3	8,768	

=== FA Cup ===
Round	Date	Opponent	Venue	Result	Attendance	Goalscorers
R3	4 January 1992	Luton Town	H	4–0	12,201	Deane, Ward, Hodges, Gayle
R4	26 January 1992	Charlton Athletic	A	0–0	9,864	
R4R	5 February 1992	Charlton Athletic	H	3–1	11,428	Deane, Gayle, Hodges
R5	15 February 1992	Chelsea	A	0–1	34,447	

=== League Cup ===
Round	Date	Opponent	Venue	Result	Attendance	Goalscorers
R2 1st leg	24 September 1991	Wigan Athletic	A	2–2	3,647	Whitehouse (2)
R2 2nd leg	8 October 1991	Wigan Athletic	H	1–0 (won 3–2 on agg)	6,608	Deane
R3	29 October 1991	West Ham United	H	0–2	11,144	

=== Full Members Cup ===
Round	Date	Opponent	Venue	Result	Attendance	Goalscorers
R2	22 October 1991	Notts County	H	3–3 (lost 1–2 on pens)	3,291	Whitehouse (2), Gayle

== Squad ==
Note: Flags indicate national team as defined under FIFA eligibility rules; some limited exceptions apply. Players may hold more than one non-FIFA nationality.

Pos.	Nation	Player
GK	ENG	Mervyn Day (on loan from Leeds United)
GK	ENG	Phil Kite
GK	WAL	Mel Rees
GK	ENG	Simon Tracey
DF	ENG	David Barnes
DF	ENG	Carl Bradshaw
DF	ENG	Paul Beesley
DF	SCO	Tom Cowan
DF	ENG	Ashley Fickling
DF	ENG	Brian Gayle
DF	NIR	Colin Hill
DF	ENG	John Pemberton
DF	ENG	Dave Walton
DF	ENG	Chris Wilder
MF	ENG	Bob Booker
MF	SCO	Ian Bryson
MF	ENG	Kevin Gage
MF	ENG	John Gannon
MF	ENG	Charlie Hartfield
MF	WAL	Glyn Hodges

Pos.	Nation	Player
MF	ENG	Jamie Hoyland
MF	WAL	Vinnie Jones
MF	ENG	Mike Lake
MF	ENG	Brian Marwood
MF	ENG	John Reed
MF	ENG	Paul Rogers
MF	NIR	Mark Todd
MF	ENG	Mitch Ward
MF	ENG	Dane Whitehouse
FW	ENG	Tony Agana
FW	ENG	Alan Cork
FW	ENG	Bobby Davison (on loan from Leeds United)
FW	ENG	Brian Deane
FW	ENG	Peter Duffield
FW	ENG	Adrian Littlejohn
FW	ENG	Clive Mendonca
FW	ENG	Nathan Peel
FW	ENG	Paul Wood

== Transfers ==
=== In ===
Date	Pos	Name	From	Fee
1 August 1991	DF	Tom Cowan	Rangers	£350,000
1 August 1991	FW	Clive Mendonca	Rotherham United	£110,000
1 August 1991	FW	Nathan Peel	Preston North End	£50,000
6 August 1991	FW	Adrian Littlejohn	Walsall	Free transfer
6 August 1991	MF	Charlie Hartfield	Arsenal	Free transfer
17 September 1991	DF	Brian Gayle	Ipswich Town	£750,000
15 November 1991	MF	Kevin Gage	Aston Villa	£150,000
29 January 1992	MF	Paul Rogers	Sutton United	£35,000

=== Out ===
Date	Pos	Name	To	Fee
31 July 1991	DF	Mark Morris	Bournemouth	£100,000
30 August 1991	MF	Vinnie Jones	Chelsea	£575,000
11 September 1991	MF	Mark Todd	Rotherham United	£35,000
3 October 1991	FW	Paul Wood	Bournemouth	£40,000
12 November 1991	FW	Tony Agana	Notts County	£750,000

Transfers in: ▼£1,445,000
Transfers out: ▲£1,500,000
Total spending: ▲£55,000
