= 1993–94 Sheffield United F.C. season =

Sheffield United F.C.
1993–94 season
- Chairman: Reg Brealey
- Manager: Dave Bassett
- Stadium: Bramall Lane
- FA Premier League: 20th (relegated)
- FA Cup: Third round
- League Cup: Second round
- Top goalscorer: League: Jostein Flo (9); All: Jostein Flo (9)
- Highest home attendance: 30,044 (vs. Sheffield Wednesday)
- Lowest home attendance: 10,615 (vs. Blackpool)

The 1993–94 season was the 105th season in existence for Sheffield United, during which they played in the Premier League under manager Dave Bassett. With little money to spend to improve the side it was a season of struggle which ended in relegation.

== Players ==
=== Squad ===
Note: Flags indicate national team as defined under FIFA eligibility rules; some limited exceptions apply. Players may hold more than one non-FIFA nationality.

No.	Pos.	Nation	Player
1	GK	(Republic of Ireland) IRL	Alan Kelly
2	MF	(England) ENG	Kevin Gage
3	DF	(Scotland) SCO	Tom Cowan
4	MF	(England) ENG	John Gannon
5	DF	(England) ENG	Brian Gayle (captain)
7	MF	(England) ENG	Franz Carr
8	MF	(England) ENG	Paul Rogers
9	FW	(England) ENG	Adrian Littlejohn
10	MF	(Wales) WAL	Glyn Hodges
11	MF	(England) ENG	Mitch Ward
12	FW	(Norway) NOR	Jostein Flo
13	GK	(England) ENG	Simon Tracey
14	DF	(England) ENG	Dave Tuttle
15	MF	(England) ENG	Charlie Hartfield

No.	Pos.	Nation	Player
16	DF	(England) ENG	Paul Beesley
17	DF	(England) ENG	Carl Bradshaw
18	MF	(England) ENG	Dane Whitehouse
21	FW	(England) ENG	Alan Cork
22	FW	(England) ENG	Andy Scott
23	MF	(England) ENG	Chris Kamara
24	DF	(Sweden) SWE	Jonas Wirmola
25	MF	(England) ENG	John Reed
26	MF	(England) ENG	Jamie Hoyland
27	MF	(England) ENG	Bobby Davison
30	FW	(Wales) WAL	Nathan Blake
31	GK	(England) ENG	Sal Bibbo
33	DF	(Norway) NOR	Roger Nilsen

=== Left club during season ===
Note: Flags indicate national team as defined under FIFA eligibility rules; some limited exceptions apply. Players may hold more than one non-FIFA nationality.

No.	Pos.	Nation	Player
6	DF	(England) ENG	David Barnes
19	FW	(Scotland) SCO	Willie Falconer

No.	Pos.	Nation	Player
20	DF	(England) ENG	John Pemberton

=== Squad statistics ===
As of the end of the season

No.	Pos	Nat	Player	Total		Premier League		FA Cup		League Cup	
No.	Pos	Nat	Player	Apps	Goals	Apps	Goals	Apps	Goals	Apps	Goals
1	GK	(Republic of Ireland) IRL	Alan Kelly	31	0	29+1	0	1	0	0	0
2	MF	(England) ENG	Kevin Gage	23	0	16+5	0	1	0	1	0
3	DF	(Scotland) SCO	Tom Cowan	4	0	4	0	0	0	0	0
4	MF	(England) ENG	John Gannon	15	0	14	0	0	0	1	0
5	DF	(England) ENG	Brian Gayle	13	3	13	3	0	0	0	0
6	DF	(England) ENG	David Barnes	3	0	2	0	0	0	1	0
7	MF	(England) ENG	Franz Carr	10	1	10	1	0	0	0	0
8	MF	(England) ENG	Paul Rogers	26	3	24+1	3	1	0	0	0
9	MF	(England) ENG	Adrian Littlejohn	20	3	12+7	3	0	0	1	0
10	MF	(Wales) WAL	Glyn Hodges	34	2	19+12	2	1	0	2	0
11	MF	(England) ENG	Mitch Ward	25	2	20+2	1	1	0	2	1
12	FW	(Norway) NOR	Jostein Flo	35	9	32+1	9	1	0	1	0
13	GK	(England) ENG	Simon Tracey	17	0	13+2	0	0	0	2	0
14	DF	(England) ENG	Dave Tuttle	34	1	31	0	1	0	2	1
15	MF	(England) ENG	Charlie Hartfield	5	0	3+2	0	0	0	0	0
16	DF	(England) ENG	Paul Beesley	28	0	22+3	0	1	0	2	0
17	DF	(England) ENG	Carl Bradshaw	43	1	39+1	1	1	0	2	0
18	MF	(England) ENG	Dane Whitehouse	41	5	35+3	5	1	0	2	0
19	FW	(Scotland) SCO	Willie Falconer	25	4	21+2	4	0	0	2	0
20	DF	(England) ENG	John Pemberton	9	0	8	0	0	0	1	0
21	FW	(England) ENG	Alan Cork	20	3	7+12	3	0	0	1	0
22	FW	(England) ENG	Andy Scott	16	1	12+3	1	0	0	1	0
23	MF	(England) ENG	Chris Kamara	17	0	15+1	0	1	0	0	0
24	DF	(Sweden) SWE	Jonas Wirmola	9	0	8	0	0	0	1	0
26	MF	(England) ENG	Jamie Hoyland	20	0	17+1	0	1	0	1	0
27	MF	(England) ENG	Bobby Davison	10	0	8+1	0	0	0	1	0
30	FW	(Wales) WAL	Nathan Blake	12	5	7+5	5	0	0	0	0
33	DF	(Norway) NOR	Roger Nilsen	23	0	21+1	0	1	0	0	0

== League table ==
Pos	Team	Pld	W	D	L	GF	GA	GD	Pts	Qualification or relegation
18	Southampton	42	12	7	23	49	66	−17	43	
19	Ipswich Town	42	9	16	17	35	58	−23	43	
20	Sheffield United (R)	42	8	18	16	42	60	−18	42	Relegation to Football League First Division
21	Oldham Athletic (R)	42	9	13	20	42	68	−26	40	Relegation to Football League First Division
22	Swindon Town (R)	42	5	15	22	47	100	−53	30	Relegation to Football League First Division

Source: Premier League
Rules for classification: 1) points; 2) goal difference; 3) number of goals scored.
(R) Relegated

== Results ==
=== FA Premier League ===
14 August 1993 1	Sheffield United	3–1	Swindon Town	Sheffield
	Falconer 21'; Bradshaw 76'; Rogers 83'		Moncur 46'	Stadium: Bramall Lane; Attendance: 20,904

18 August 1993 2	Manchester United	3–0	Sheffield United	Manchester
	Keane 16', 43'; Hughes 85'			Stadium: Old Trafford; Attendance: 41,949

21 August 1993 3	Everton	4–2	Sheffield United	Liverpool
	Cottee 35', 83', 90'; Ebbrell 45'		Whitehouse 1'; Cork 89'	Stadium: Goodison Park; Attendance: 24,169

24 August 1993 4	Sheffield United	2–1	Wimbledon	Sheffield
	Flo 43'; Falconer 58'		Clarke 59'	Stadium: Bramall Lane; Attendance: 15,555

28 August 1993 5	Sheffield United	1–1	Ipswich Town	Sheffield
	Flo 25'		Whitton 89'	Stadium: Bramall Lane; Attendance: 17,932

1 September 1993 6	Queens Park Rangers	2–1	Sheffield United	London
	Sinclair 15'; Wilson 63' (pen.)		Flo 10'	Stadium: Loftus Road; Attendance: 11,113

11 September 1993 7	Sheffield United	2–2	Tottenham Hotspur	Sheffield
	Littlejohn 47', 62'		Sheringham 15', 51'	Stadium: Bramall Lane; Attendance: 21,325

18 September 1993 8	Leeds United	2–1	Sheffield United	Leeds
	McAllister 5'; Strachan 9'		Kelly 44' (o.g.)	Stadium: Elland Road; Attendance: 33,892

25 September 1993 9	Sheffield United	0–1	Manchester City	Sheffield
			Sheron 56'	Stadium: Bramall Lane; Attendance: 20,067

2 October 1993 10	Southampton	3–3	Sheffield United	Southampton
	Monkou 28'; Maddison 53'; Kenna 77'		Tuttle (red card) 46'; Falconer 72'; Flo 81', 89'	Stadium: The Dell; Attendance: 11,619

18 October 1993 11	Blackburn Rovers	0–0	Sheffield United	Blackburn
				Stadium: Ewood Park; Attendance: 13,505

23 October 1993 12	Sheffield United	1–1	Sheffield Wednesday	Sheffield
	Hodges 7'		Palmer 12'	Stadium: Bramall Lane; Attendance: 30,044

31 October 1993 13	Coventry City	0–0	Sheffield United	Coventry
				Stadium: Highfield Road; Attendance: 10,429

6 November 1993 14	Sheffield United	1–2	Norwich City	Sheffield
	Whitehouse 43' (pen.)		Goss 26'; Eadie 57'	Stadium: Bramall Lane; Attendance: 18,254

20 November 1993 15	Aston Villa	1–0	Sheffield United	Birmingham
	Whittingham 76'			Stadium: Villa Park; Attendance: 24,686

24 November 1993 16	Newcastle United	4–0	Sheffield United	Newcastle upon Tyne
	Sellars 9'; Beardsley 12' (pen.), 73'; Cole 70'			Stadium: St James' Park; Attendance: 35,101

27 November 1993 17	Sheffield United	1–0	Chelsea	Sheffield
	Falconer 32'			Stadium: Bramall Lane; Attendance: 16,119

4 December 1993 18	Swindon Town	0–0	Sheffield United	Swindon
				Stadium: County Ground; Attendance: 12,734

7 December 1993 19	Sheffield United	0–3	Manchester United	Sheffield
			Hughes 13'; Sharpe 27'; Cantona 60'	Stadium: Bramall Lane; Attendance: 26,744

11 December 1993 20	Sheffield United	0–0	Everton	Sheffield
				Stadium: Bramall Lane; Attendance: 15,135

18 December 1993 21	Wimbledon	2–0	Sheffield United	London
	Barton 49'; Holdsworth 67'			Stadium: Selhurst Park; Attendance: 6,728

26 December 1993 22	Sheffield United	0–0	Liverpool	Sheffield
				Stadium: Bramall Lane; Attendance: 22,932

29 December 1993 23	Arsenal	3–0	Sheffield United	London
	Campbell 11', 55'; Wright 40'			Stadium: Highbury; Attendance: 27,035

1 January 1994 24	Sheffield United	2–1	Oldham Athletic	Sheffield
	Whitehouse 23' (pen.); Ward 32'		Jobson 45'	Stadium: Bramall Lane; Attendance: 17,066

3 January 1994 25	West Ham United	0–0	Sheffield United	London
				Stadium: Boleyn Ground; Attendance: 20,365

15 January 1994 26	Sheffield United	1–2	Blackburn Rovers	Sheffield
	Scott 18'; Cork (red card) 75'; Bradshaw (red card) 88'		Shearer 38', 64'	Stadium: Bramall Lane; Attendance: 19,124

22 January 1994 27	Sheffield Wednesday	3–1	Sheffield United	Sheffield
	Bright 58'; Pearce 61'; Watson 70'		Whitehouse 87' (pen.)	Stadium: Hillsborough; Attendance: 34,959

12 February 1994 28	Sheffield United	0–0	Coventry City	Sheffield
				Stadium: Bramall Lane; Attendance: 15,394

22 February 1994 29	Ipswich Town	3–2	Sheffield United	Ipswich
	Linghan 2'; Marshall 8'; Slater 36'		Cork 23'; Carr 49'	Stadium: Portman Road; Attendance: 10,747

5 March 1994 30	Tottenham Hotspur	2–2	Sheffield United	London
	Scott 64'; Dozzell 90'		Gayle 57'; Blake 86'	Stadium: White Hart Lane; Attendance: 25,741

12 March 1994 31	Sheffield United	2–2	Leeds United	Sheffield
	Flo 74'; Gayle 89'		Speed 28'; Deane 58'	Stadium: Bramall Lane; Attendance: 19,425

16 March 1994 32	Sheffield United	1–1	Queens Park Rangers	Sheffield
	Blake 48'		Barker 12'	Stadium: Bramall Lane; Attendance: 14,183

19 March 1994 33	Manchester City	0–0	Sheffield United	Manchester
				Stadium: Maine Road; Attendance: 25,448

26 March 1994 34	Sheffield United	0–0	Southampton	Sheffield
				Stadium: Bramall Lane; Attendance: 19,522

28 March 1994 35	Sheffield United	3–2	West Ham United	Sheffield
	Whitehouse 40'; Gayle 48'; Rogers 73'		Bishop 8'; Holmes 30'	Stadium: Bramall Lane; Attendance: 13,646

2 April 1994 36	Liverpool	1–2	Sheffield United	Liverpool
	Rush 3'		Flo 46', 72'	Stadium: Anfield; Attendance: 36,642

4 April 1994 37	Sheffield United	1–1	Arsenal	Sheffield
	Rogers 54'		Campbell 69'	Stadium: Bramall Lane; Attendance: 20,019

16 April 1994 38	Sheffield United	1–2	Aston Villa	Sheffield
	Littlejohn 17'		Richardson 23'; Fenton 25'	Stadium: Bramall Lane; Attendance: 18,402

23 April 1994 39	Norwich City	0–1	Sheffield United	Norwich
			Blake 31'	Stadium: Carrow Road; Attendance: 18,474

30 April 1994 40	Sheffield United	2–0	Newcastle United	Sheffield
	Blake 63', 90'			Stadium: Bramall Lane; Attendance: 29,013

3 May 1994 41	Oldham Athletic	1–1	Sheffield United	Oldham
	Beckford 24'		Cork 9'; Tracey (red card) 70'	Stadium: Boundary Park; Attendance: 14,779

7 May 1994 42	Chelsea	3–2	Sheffield United	London
	Kjeldbjerg 57'; Stein 76', 90'		Flo 29'; Hodges 59'	Stadium: Stamford Bridge; Attendance: 21,782

=== FA Cup ===
9 January 1994 Round 3	Sheffield United	0–1	Manchester United	Sheffield
			Hughes 49'	Stadium: Bramall Lane; Attendance: 22,019

=== League Cup ===
21 September 1993 Round 1 Leg 1	Blackpool	3–0	Sheffield United	Blackpool
				Stadium: Bloomfield Road; Attendance: 6,234

5 October 1994 Round 1 Leg 2	Sheffield United	2–0 (2–3 agg.)	Blackpool	Sheffield
				Stadium: Bramall Lane; Attendance: 10,615
