= 1992–93 Sheffield United F.C. season =

Sheffield United
1992–93 season
- Chairman: Paul Woolhouse (until October); Alan Laver (from October)
- Manager: Dave Bassett
- Stadium: Bramall Lane
- Premier League: 14th
- FA Cup: Semi-finals
- League Cup: Third round
- Top goalscorer: League: Deane (15); All: Deane (20)
- Highest home attendance: 30,039 (vs. Sheffield Wednesday)
- Lowest home attendance: 7,855 (vs. Bristol City)
- Average home league attendance: 18,801
Home colours	Away colours	Third colours

During the 1992–93 English football season, Sheffield United competed in the inaugural season of the FA Premier League under manager Dave Bassett.

== Season summary ==
Highlights of the season included a 6–0 home win over Tottenham Hotspur and an opening-day 2–1 win over eventual champions Manchester United. The club also reached the FA Cup semi-final, but were beaten by arch-rivals Sheffield Wednesday. In the victory over Man Utd Brian Deane scored the first ever Premier League goal.

At the end of the season, the newly formed League Managers Association presented its "Manager of the Year" award for the first time, specifically designed to recognise "the manager who made best use of the resources available to him". This award went to United manager Dave Bassett.

== Kit ==
The kit was manufactured by British apparel company Umbro and sponsored by English timber merchant Arnold Laver.

== Final league table ==
Pos	Team	Pld	W	D	L	GF	GA	GD	Pts
12	Wimbledon	42	14	12	16	56	55	+1	54
13	Everton	42	15	8	19	53	55	−2	53
14	Sheffield United	42	14	10	18	54	53	+1	52
15	Coventry City	42	13	13	16	52	57	−5	52
16	Ipswich Town	42	12	16	14	50	55	−5	52

Source: Premier League
Rules for classification: 1) points; 2) goal difference; 3) number of goals scored.

== Results ==
Sheffield United's score comes first

=== Legend ===
Win	Draw	Loss

=== FA Premier League ===
Date	Opponent	Venue	Result	Attendance	Scorers
15 August 1992	Manchester United	H	2–1	28,070	Deane (2, 1 pen)
19 August 1992	Liverpool	A	1–2	33,107	Deane
22 August 1992	Queens Park Rangers	A	2–3	10,932	Cork, Deane
25 August 1992	Wimbledon	H	2–2	15,463	Beesley, Hodges
29 August 1992	Aston Villa	H	0–2	18,773	
2 September 1992	Tottenham Hotspur	A	0–2	21,332	
5 September 1992	Middlesbrough	A	0–2	15,179	
12 September 1992	Liverpool	H	1–0	20,632	Littlejohn
19 September 1992	Arsenal	H	1–1	19,105	Whitehouse
26 September 1992	Ipswich Town	A	0–0	16,353	
3 October 1992	Southampton	H	2–0	15,842	Whitehouse, Littlejohn
17 October 1992	Leeds United	A	1–3	29,706	Beesley
24 October 1992	Nottingham Forest	H	0–0	19,152	
31 October 1992	Chelsea	A	2–1	13,763	Littlejohn, Deane
8 November 1992	Sheffield Wednesday	H	1–1	30,039	Littlejohn
21 November 1992	Norwich City	A	1–2	14,874	Cork
28 November 1992	Coventry City	H	1–1	15,625	Pearce (own goal)
5 December 1992	Crystal Palace	A	0–2	12,361	
12 December 1992	Everton	H	1–0	16,266	Littlejohn
19 December 1992	Blackburn Rovers	A	0–1	16,057	
26 December 1992	Manchester City	A	0–2	27,455	
9 January 1993	Arsenal	A	1–1	23,818	Littlejohn
16 January 1993	Ipswich Town	H	3–0	16,758	Deane (3)
27 January 1993	Aston Villa	A	1–3	20,266	Deane
30 January 1993	Queens Park Rangers	H	1–2	16,366	Hoyland
6 February 1993	Manchester United	A	1–2	36,156	Carr
9 February 1993	Middlesbrough	H	2–0	15,184	Carr, Deane
20 February 1993	Wimbledon	A	0–2	3,979	
22 February 1993	Oldham Athletic	H	2–0	14,628	Gannon, Littlejohn
27 February 1993	Southampton	A	2–3	13,814	Gayle, Bryson
2 March 1993	Tottenham Hotspur	H	6–0	16,654	Carr, Gray (own goal), Bryson (2), Deane, Rogers
10 March 1993	Norwich City	H	0–1	15,583	
20 March 1993	Crystal Palace	H	0–1	18,857	
24 March 1993	Coventry City	A	3–1	12,993	Whitehouse, Deane, Littlejohn
6 April 1993	Leeds United	H	2–1	20,562	Rogers, Deane
9 April 1993	Manchester City	H	1–1	18,231	Deane
13 April 1993	Oldham Athletic	A	1–1	14,795	Hoyland
17 April 1993	Blackburn Rovers	H	1–3	18,186	Hodges
21 April 1993	Sheffield Wednesday	A	1–1	38,688	Deane
1 May 1993	Nottingham Forest	A	2–0	26,752	Hodges, Gayle
4 May 1993	Everton	A	2–0	15,197	Bradshaw, Hodges
8 May 1993	Chelsea	H	4–2	24,850	Scott, Rogers, Whitehouse (2)

=== FA Cup ===
Round	Date	Opponent	Venue	Result	Attendance	Goalscorers
R3	2 January 1993	Burnley	H	2–2	23,041	Hodges, Beesley
R3R	12 January 1993	Burnley	A	4–2	19,061	Deane (3), Littlejohn
R4	23 January 1993	Hartlepool United	H	1–0	20,074	Cork
R5	14 February 1993	Manchester United	H	2–1	27,150	Hoyland, Hodges
QF	6 March 1993	Blackburn Rovers	A	0–0	6,721	
QFR	16 March 1993	Blackburn Rovers	H	2–2 (won 5–3 on pens)	23,920	Ward (2)
SF	3 April 1993	Sheffield Wednesday	N	1–2 (a.e.t.)	75,364	Cork

=== League Cup ===
Round	Date	Opponent	Venue	Result	Attendance	Goalscorers
R2 First Leg	22 September 1992	Bristol City	A	1–2	6,922	Rogers
R2 Second Leg	7 October 1992	Bristol City	H	4–1 (won 5–3 on agg)	7,588	Bradshaw, Whitehouse, Deane (2)
R3	28 October 1992	Liverpool	H	0–0	17,856	
R3R	11 November 1992	Liverpool	A	0–3	17,654	

== Players ==
=== First-team squad ===
Note: Flags indicate national team as defined under FIFA eligibility rules; some limited exceptions apply. Players may hold more than one non-FIFA nationality.

Pos.	Nation	Player
GK	IRL	Alan Kelly
DF	ENG	Carl Bradshaw
DF	ENG	Paul Beesley
DF	ENG	Brian Gayle (captain)
DF	SCO	Tom Cowan
MF	WAL	Glyn Hodges
MF	ENG	Kevin Gage
MF	ENG	Paul Rogers
MF	ENG	John Gannon
FW	ENG	Brian Deane
FW	ENG	Adrian Littlejohn
FW	ENG	Alan Cork
MF	ENG	Mitch Ward
DF	ENG	John Pemberton
GK	ENG	Simon Tracey

Pos.	Nation	Player
MF	ENG	Jamie Hoyland
MF	ENG	Charlie Hartfield
DF	ENG	David Barnes
MF	ENG	Dane Whitehouse
MF	SCO	Ian Bryson
MF	ENG	Franz Carr
DF	ENG	Chris Kamara (on loan from Luton Town)
DF	ENG	Alan McLeary (on loan from Millwall)
FW	ENG	Andy Scott
GK	SCO	Jim Leighton (on loan from Dundee)
FW	ENG	Peter Duffield
MF	ENG	John Reed
DF	ENG	Ashley Fickling
DF	ENG	Dave Walton

=== Left club during season ===
Note: Flags indicate national team as defined under FIFA eligibility rules; some limited exceptions apply. Players may hold more than one non-FIFA nationality.

Pos.	Nation	Player
MF	ENG	Mike Lake (until November)

=== Reserves ===
Note: Flags indicate national team as defined under FIFA eligibility rules; some limited exceptions apply. Players may hold more than one non-FIFA nationality.

Pos.	Nation	Player
GK	ENG	Phil Kite

== Squad statistics ==
As of the end of the season

No.	Pos	Nat	Player	Total		Premier League		FA Cup		League Cup	
No.	Pos	Nat	Player	Apps	Goals	Apps	Goals	Apps	Goals	Apps	Goals
	DF	(England) ENG	David Barnes	17	0	13	0	3	0	1	0
	DF	(England) ENG	Paul Beesley	49	3	39	2	6	1	4	0
	DF	(England) ENG	Carl Bradshaw	38	2	24+8	1	2	0	4	1
	MF	(Scotland) SCO	Ian Bryson	25	3	9+7	3	6	0	3	0
	MF	(England) ENG	Franz Carr	12	3	8	3	4	0	0	0
	FW	(England) ENG	Alan Cork	36	4	11+16	2	6	2	3	0
	DF	(Scotland) SCO	Tom Cowan	25	0	21	0	1	0	3	0
	FW	(England) ENG	Brian Deane	51	20	41	15	6	3	4	2
	MF	(England) ENG	Kevin Gage	36	0	27	0	6	0	3	0
	MF	(England) ENG	John Gannon	33	1	26+1	1	2	0	4	0
	DF	(England) ENG	Brian Gayle	41	2	31	2	6	0	4	0
	MF	(England) ENG	Charlie Hartfield	21	0	12+5	0	3	0	1	0
	MF	(Wales) WAL	Glyn Hodges	41	6	28+3	4	7	2	3	0
	MF	(England) ENG	Jamie Hoyland	30	3	15+7	2	7	1	1	0
	MF	(England) ENG	Chris Kamara	8	0	6+2	0	0	0	0	0
	GK	(Republic of Ireland) IRL	Alan Kelly	43	0	32+1	0	7	0	3	0
	MF	(England) ENG	Mike Lake	6	0	6	0	0	0	0	0
	MF	(England) ENG	Adrian Littlejohn	35	9	18+9	8	5	1	3	0
	DF	(England) ENG	Alan McLeary	3	0	3	0	0	0	0	0
	DF	(England) ENG	John Pemberton	23	0	19	0	4	0	0	0
	MF	(England) ENG	Paul Rogers	34	4	26+1	3	3	0	4	1
	FW	(England) ENG	Andy Scott	2	1	1+1	1	0	0	0	0
	GK	(England) ENG	Simon Tracey	11	0	10	0	0	0	1	0
	MF	(England) ENG	Mitch Ward	31	2	22+4	0	4	2	1	0
	MF	(England) ENG	Dane Whitehouse	18	6	14	5	3	0	1	1
