= 1990–91 Sheffield United F.C. season =

Sheffield United
1990–91 season
- Chairman: Reg Brealey
- Manager: Dave Bassett
- Stadium: Bramall Lane
- First Division: 13th
- FA Cup: Third round
- League Cup: Fourth round
- Full Members Cup: Quarter finals (Northern Area)
- Top goalscorer: Deane (13)
- Average home league attendance: 21,451

During the 1990–91 English football season, Sheffield United F.C. competed in the Football League First Division, after being promoted from the Second Division the previous season.

== Season summary ==
Sheffield United had returned to the top flight after two successive promotions, and it soon appeared that perhaps First Division survival was a bridge too far, with the club going 16 matches without a win at the start of the season, leaving the club bottom of the division on Christmas Day with only 4 points. However, a run of seven straight victories at the turn of the year lifted United from 20th to 12th, and, although the winning streak eventually came to a halt, it was more than enough to ensure United's survival in 13th, twelve points clear of relegation.

== Final league table ==
Pos	Team	Pld	W	D	L	GF	GA	GD	Pts
11	Chelsea	38	13	10	15	58	69	−11	49
12	Queens Park Rangers	38	12	10	16	44	53	−9	46
13	Sheffield United	38	13	7	18	36	55	−19	46
14	Southampton	38	12	9	17	58	69	−11	45
15	Norwich City	38	13	6	19	41	64	−23	45

Source: World Football
Rules for classification: 1) Points; 2) Goal difference; 3) Goals scored

== Results ==
=== First Division ===
25 August 1990 1	Sheffield United	1–3	Liverpool	Sheffield
	Deane 60'		Barnes 59'; Houghton 65'; Rush 88'	Stadium: Bramall Lane; Attendance: 27,009

29 August 1990 2	Derby County	1–1	Sheffield United	Derby
	Saunders 66'		Deane 89'	Stadium: Baseball Ground; Attendance: 18,011

1 September 1990 3	Crystal Palace	1–0	Sheffield United	London
	Thompson 39'			Stadium: Selhurst Park; Attendance: 16,839

8 September 1990 4	Sheffield United	1–1	Manchester City	Sheffield
	Deane 62'		White 53'	Stadium: Bramall Lane; Attendance: 21,895

15 September 1990 5	Southampton	2–0	Sheffield United	Southampton
	Le Tissier 5'; Wallace 28'			Stadium: The Dell; Attendance: 15,883

23 September 1990 6	Sheffield United	0–2	Leeds United	Sheffield
			Pearson 73'; Strachan 90'	Stadium: Bramall Lane; Attendance: 26,078

29 September 1990 7	Chelsea	2–2	Sheffield United	London
	Wilson 25', 29'		Jones 45'; Deane 90'	Stadium: Stamford Bridge; Attendance: 19,873

6 October 1990 8	Sheffield United	1–2	Wimbledon	Sheffield
	Barnes 11'		Fairweather 26'; Fashanu 71'	Stadium: Bramall Lane; Attendance: 17,650

20 October 1990 9	Tottenham Hotspur	4–0	Sheffield United	London
	Walsh 50', 78', 89'; Nayim 65'			Stadium: White Hart Lane; Attendance: 34,612

27 October 1990 10	Sheffield United	0–1	Coventry City	Sheffield
			Borrows 80' (pen.)	Stadium: Bramall Lane; Attendance: 17,978

3 November 1990 11	Norwich City	3–0	Sheffield United	Norwich
	Sherwood 30'; Jones 51' (o.g.); Phillips 75'			Stadium: Carrow Road; Attendance: 14,806

10 November 1990 12	Sheffield United	0–0	Everton	Sheffield
				Stadium: Bramall Lane; Attendance: 21,447

17 November 1990 13	Manchester United	2–0	Sheffield United	Manchester
	Bruce 65'; Hughes 85'			Stadium: Old Trafford; Attendance: 45,903

24 November 1990 14	Sheffield United	0–2	Sunderland	Sheffield
			Gabbiadini 70', 90'	Stadium: Bramall Lane; Attendance: 19,179

1 December 1990 15	Aston Villa	2–1	Sheffield United	Birmingham
	Platt 9'; Price 81'		Jones 50'	Stadium: Villa Park; Attendance: 21,713

15 December 1990 16	Liverpool	2–0	Sheffield United	Liverpool
	Barnes 61'; Rush 75'			Stadium: Anfield; Attendance: 33,516

22 December 1990 17	Sheffield United	3–2	Nottingham Forest	Sheffield
	Bryson 49', 58'; Deane 65'		Keane 49'; Pearce 57'	Stadium: Bramall Lane; Attendance: 20,394

26 December 1990 18	Luton Town	0–1	Sheffield United	Luton
			Deane 71'	Stadium: Kenilworth Road; Attendance: 10,004

29 December 1990 19	Arsenal	4–1	Sheffield United	London
	Dixon 50' (pen.); Smith 66', 85'; Thomas 71'		Bryson 25'	Stadium: Highbury; Attendance: 37,866

1 January 1991 20	Sheffield United	1–0	Queens Park Rangers	Sheffield
	Deane 6'			Stadium: Bramall Lane; Attendance: 21,158

12 January 1991 21	Sheffield United	0–1	Crystal Palace	Sheffield
			Bright 75'	Stadium: Bramall Lane; Attendance: 17,139

19 January 1991 22	Manchester City	2–0	Sheffield United	Manchester
	Ward 19', 88'; Redmond (red card) 64'		Jones (red card) 54'	Stadium: Maine Road; Attendance: 25,741

26 January 1991 23	Sheffield United	1–0	Derby County	Sheffield
	Hodges 88'			Stadium: Bramall Lane; Attendance: 18,390

2 February 1991 24	Sheffield United	4–1	Southampton	Sheffield
	Booker 17', 19'; Deane 28'; Hodges 29'		Moore 54'	Stadium: Bramall Lane; Attendance: 16,887

23 February 1991 25	Everton	1–2	Sheffield United	Liverpool
	Cottee 2'		Hodges 16'; Marwood 88'	Stadium: Goodison Park; Attendance: 28,148

26 February 1991 26	Sheffield United	2–1	Manchester United	Sheffield
	Deane 49'; Bradshaw 71'		Blackmore 52' (pen.)	Stadium: Bramall Lane; Attendance: 27,570

2 March 1991 27	Sheffield United	2–1	Aston Villa	Sheffield
	Bryson 48'; Deane 61'		Mountfield 56'	Stadium: Bramall Lane; Attendance: 22,074

9 March 1991 28	Sunderland	0–1	Sheffield United	Sunderland
	Ball (red card) 83'		Bryson 55'	Stadium: Roker Park; Attendance: 23,238

16 March 1991 29	Sheffield United	1–0	Chelsea	Sheffield
	Bryson 85'			Stadium: Bramall Lane; Attendance: 20,581

23 March 1991 30	Wimbledon	1–1	Sheffield United	London
	Cork 21'		Deane 70'	Stadium: Plough Lane; Attendance: 7,031

30 March 1991 31	Sheffield United	2–1	Luton Town	Sheffield
	Bryson 55'; Hodges 58'		Elstrup 10'	Stadium: Bramall Lane; Attendance: 18,487

1 April 1991 32	Nottingham Forest	2–0	Sheffield United	Nottingham
	Gaynor 39', 72'			Stadium: City Ground; Attendance: 25,308

6 April 1991 33	Sheffield United	0–2	Arsenal	Sheffield
			Campbell 9'; Smith 73'	Stadium: Bramall Lane; Attendance: 26,920

13 April 1991 34	Queens Park Rangers	1–2	Sheffield United	London
	Allen 39'		Deane 18'; Booker 85'	Stadium: Loftus Road; Attendance: 13,801

20 April 1991 35	Sheffield United	2–2	Tottenham Hotspur	Sheffield
	Beesley 78'; Deane 90'		Edinburgh 67'; Walsh 72'	Stadium: Bramall Lane; Attendance: 25,706

4 May 1991 36	Coventry City	0–0	Sheffield United	Coventry
				Stadium: Highfield Road; Attendance: 17,312

8 May 1991 37	Leeds United	2–1	Sheffield United	Leeds
	Sterland 11'; Shutt 56'		Marwood 53'	Stadium: Elland Road; Attendance: 28,978

11 May 1991 38	Sheffield United	2–1	Norwich City	Sheffield
	Agana 12', 18'		Polston 10'	Stadium: Bramall Lane; Attendance: 21,019

=== FA Cup ===
5 January 1991 Round 3	Sheffield United	1–3	Luton Town	Sheffield
				Stadium: Bramall Lane

=== League Cup ===
25 September 1990 Round 2 Leg 1	Northampton Town	0–1	Sheffield United	Northampton
				Stadium: County Ground; Attendance: 6,714

10 October 1990 Round 2 Leg 2	Sheffield United	2–0 (3–0 agg.)	Northampton Town	Sheffield
				Stadium: Bramall Lane; Attendance: 8,679

30 October 1990 Round 3	Sheffield United	2–1	Everton	Sheffield
				Stadium: Bramall Lane; Attendance: 15,045

27 November 1990 Round 4	Sheffield United	0–2	Tottenham Hotspur	Sheffield
			Stewart; Gascoigne	Stadium: Bramall Lane; Attendance: 25,862

=== Full Members' Cup ===
11 December 1990 Northern Section Round 2	Sheffield United	7–2	Oldham Athletic	Sheffield
				Stadium: Bramall Lane; Attendance: 3,144

22 February 1991 Northern Section Quarter Final	Sheffield United	0–2	Manchester City	Sheffield
				Stadium: Bramall Lane; Attendance: 5,920

== Players ==
=== First-team squad ===
Squad at end of season

Note: Flags indicate national team as defined under FIFA eligibility rules; some limited exceptions apply. Players may hold more than one non-FIFA nationality.

Pos.	Nation	Player
GK	ENG	Matt Dickins
GK	ENG	Phil Kite
GK	ENG	Simon Tracey
DF	ENG	David Barnes
DF	ENG	Paul Beesley
DF	ENG	Carl Bradshaw
DF	NIR	Colin Hill (Note: Hill was born in Hillingdon, England, but also qualified to represent Northern Ireland internationally and made his international debut for Northern Ireland in 1990.)
DF	ENG	Mark Morris
DF	ENG	John Pemberton
DF	ENG	Chris Wilder
MF	ENG	Bob Booker
MF	ENG	John Gannon
MF	WAL	Glyn Hodges (Note: Hodges was born in Streatham, England, but also qualified to represent Wales internationally and made his international debut for Wales in 1984.)
MF	ENG	Jamie Hoyland

Pos.	Nation	Player
MF	ENG	Vinnie Jones (Note: Jones was born in Watford, England, but also qualified to represent Wales internationally through his maternal grandfather and would make his international debut for Wales in December 1994.)
MF	ENG	Mike Lake
MF	ENG	Brian Marwood
MF	NIR	Mark Todd
MF	ENG	Mitch Ward
MF	ENG	Dane Whitehouse
MF	ENG	Paul Wood
MF	SCO	Ian Bryson
FW	ENG	Tony Agana
FW	ENG	Brian Deane
FW	ENG	Peter Duffield
FW	ENG	Andy Sayer (on loan from Leyton Orient)
FW	ENG	Billy Whitehurst

=== Left club during season ===
Note: Flags indicate national team as defined under FIFA eligibility rules; some limited exceptions apply. Players may hold more than one non-FIFA nationality.

Pos.	Nation	Player
DF	ENG	Darren Carr (to Crewe Alexandra)
DF	ENG	Paul Stancliffe (to Wolves)

Pos.	Nation	Player
MF	ENG	Wilf Rostron (to Brentford)

== Transfers ==
=== Out ===
- Wilf Rostron - Brentford, January 1991
