= Sheffield United F.C. Player of the Year =

Annual soccer award in United Kingdom

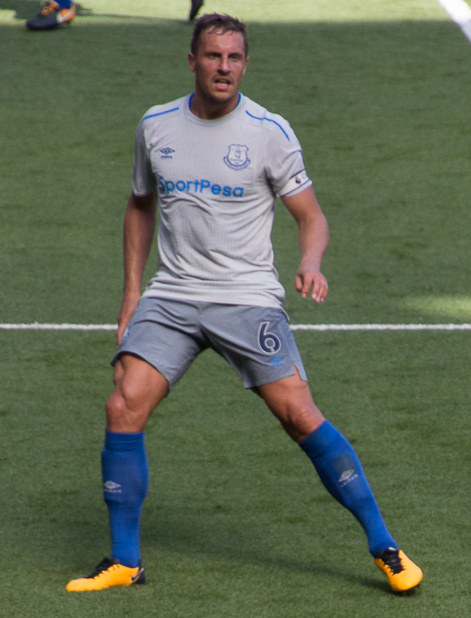
Phil Jagielka won the award for three consecutive years, in 2005, 2006 and 2007

The Sheffield United F.C. Player of the Year is an annual award presented to players of Sheffield United on behalf of the club's fans to recognise an outstanding contribution to the previous season. First presented in 1967 the award was organised by the Official Supporters Club and voted for by its members. The award was officially recognised and commemorated by the club and since the late 1990s has been presented at a gala dinner. From around 2000 the award was widened to include voting from the general fanbase and various other awards have also been presented including Young Player of the Year and Goal of the Season.

== Explanation of list ==
=== Appearances ===
Appearances and goals are listed for the season for which the player won the award. Only competitive fixtures are included in the statistics. These include:

- Football League and Premier League
- Play-off matches
- FA Cup, Football League Cup, Football League Trophy, Full Members Cup, Texaco Cup, Anglo-Scottish Cup, Anglo-Italian Cup
- Friendly matches, exhibition games, and pre-season tournaments are excluded from the figures.

=== Table headers ===
- Season – Seasons run from August until May with the award being presented in April or May for the proceeding season. Awards are listed as the year of season end.
- Level – The league and level at which the season was played. Division One was the highest level in English football until the formation of the Premier League in 1992–93 after which Division One became the second tier. In 2004–05 The Championship was formed as the new second tier with League One and Two making up the remainder of the Football League.
- Nationality – The player's officially recognised FIFA nationality. A player may have been born in one country but represented another nation through family ancestry.
- Apps – The number of games played in the season including any substitute appearances.
- Goals – The number of goals scored in the season.
- Notes – Further info on the award.

== Winners ==
Season	Level	Name	Position	Nationality	Apps	Gls	Notes	Refs
1967	Division One	Alan Hodgkinson	GK	England	51	0	Inaugural winner. First goalkeeper to win.	
1968	Division One	Ken Mallender	DF	England	41	0	First defender to win.	
1969	Division Two	Dave Powell	DF	Wales	28	0	First non-English winner.	
1970	Division Two	Alan Woodward	FW	England	47	21	First forward to win.	
1971	Division Two	Tony Currie	FW	England	45	10		
1972	Division One	Trevor Hockey	MF	Wales	34	1	First midfielder to win.	
1973	Division One	Ted Hemsley	DF	England	50	2		
1974	Division One	Alan Woodward	FW	England	46	18	First player to win more than once.	
1975	Division One	Jim Brown	GK	Scotland	51	0		
1976	Division One	Alan Woodward	FW	England	47	12	First player to win on three occasions	
1977	Division Two	Keith Edwards	FW	England	33	18		
1978	Division Two	Alan Woodward	FW	England	44	12	First player to win on four occasions	
1979	Division Two	Tony Kenworthy	FW	England	43	3		
1980	Division Three	Tony Kenworthy	FW	England	55	7	First player to win in consecutive years	
1981	Division Three	Bob Hatton	FW	England	53	22		
1982	Division Four	Mike Trusson	MF	England	50	11		
1983	Division Three	Mike Trusson	MF	England	39	9		
1984	Division Three	Keith Edwards	FW	England	53	39		
1985	Division Two	Glenn Cockerill	MF	England	43	7		
1986	Division Two	Paul Stancliffe	DF	England	45	1		
1987	Division Two	Peter Beagrie	MF	England	47	9		
1988	Division Two	Paul Stancliffe	DF	England	47	3		
1989	Division Three	Tony Agana	FW	England	58	29		
1990	Division Two	Simon Tracey	GK	England	56	0		
1991	Division One	Brian Deane	FW	England	44	17		
1992	Division One	Simon Tracey	GK	England	32	0		
1993	Premier League	Paul Beesley	DF	England	49	3		
1994	Premier League	Carl Bradshaw	DF	England	43	1		
1995	Division One	Kevin Gage	MF	England	44	5		
1996	Division One	Alan Kelly	GK	Republic of Ireland	39	0	First winner from outside of the United Kingdom	
1997	Division One	Petr Katchouro	FW	Belarus	48	14		
1998	Division One	Nicky Marker	DF	England	57	2		
1999	Division One	Curtis Woodhouse	MF	England	41	3		
2000	Division One	Paul Devlin	MF	Scotland	49	11		
2001	Division One	Shaun Murphy	DF	Australia	52	5		
2002	Division One	Michael Brown	MF	England	40	6		
2003	Division One	Paddy Kenny	GK	Republic of Ireland	59	0		
2004	Division One	Chris Morgan	DF	England	36	2		
2005	Championship	Phil Jagielka	DF	England	54	2		
2006	Championship	Phil Jagielka	MF	England	47	8		
2007	Premier League	Phil Jagielka	DF	England	38	4	First player to win for three consecutive years	
2008	Championship	James Beattie	FW	England	41	22		
2009	Championship	Matthew Kilgallon	DF	England	49	1		
2010	Championship	Nick Montgomery	MF	Scotland	43	1		
2011	Championship	Stephen Quinn	MF	Republic of Ireland	38	1		
2012	League One	Harry Maguire	DF	England	56	1	Also won Young Player of the Year award	
2013	League One	Harry Maguire	DF	England	51	5		
2014	League One	Harry Maguire	DF	England	50	6		
2015	League One	Jamie Murphy	MF	Scotland	45	11		
2016	League One	Billy Sharp	FW	England	48	21		
2017	League One	John Fleck; Billy Sharp	MF; FW	Scotland; England	49; 46	4; 30	First award to be shared between two players.	
2018	Championship	John Fleck	MF	Scotland	44	2		
2019	Championship	David McGoldrick	FW	Republic of Ireland	45	15		
2020	Premier League	Chris Basham	DF	England	42	0		
2021	Premier League	Aaron Ramsdale	GK	England	42	0	Also won Young Player of the Year award	
2022	Championship	Morgan Gibbs-White	MF	England	35	11	Also won Young Player of the Year award	
2023	Championship	Iliman Ndiaye	MF	Senegal	47	14		
2024	Premier League	Gustavo Hamer	MF	Netherlands	35	4	First award to be consecutively awarded to an overseas born player	
2025	Championship	Michael Cooper	GK	England	43	0		
2026	Championship	Callum O'Hare	MF	England	45	8		

=== Wins by player ===
Players who have won the award more than once.

Winner	Total wins	Year(s)
(England) Alan Woodward	4	1970, 1974, 1976, 1978
(England) Phil Jagielka	3	2005, 2006, 2007
(England) Harry Maguire	3	2012, 2013, 2014
(England) Tony Kenworthy	2	1979, 1980
(England) Mike Trusson	2	1982, 1983
(England) Keith Edwards	2	1977, 1984
(England) Paul Stancliffe	2	1986, 1988
(England) Tony Kenworthy	2	1979, 1980
(England) Simon Tracey	2	1990, 1992
(England) Billy Sharp	2	2016, 2017
(Scotland) John Fleck	2	2017, 2018

=== Wins by playing position ===
Position	Number of winners
Goalkeeper	7
Defender	17
Midfielder	18
Forward	16

=== Wins by nationality ===
Nationality	Number of winners
England	44
Scotland	5
Republic of Ireland	3
Wales	2
Australia	1
Belarus	1
Netherlands	1
Senegal	1

== Young Player of the Year ==
Season	Level	Name	Position	Nationality	Apps	Gls	Notes	Refs
2011	Championship	Matt Lowton	DF	England	32	4		
2012	League One	Harry Maguire	DF	England	56	1	Also won the Player of the Year award	
2013	League One	George Long	GK	England	44	0		
2014	League One	Connor Dimaio	MF	Republic of Ireland	3	0		
2015	League One	Louis Reed	MF	England	32	0		
2016	League One	Che Adams	FW	Scotland	41	12		
2017	League One	David Brooks	MF	Wales	4	0		
2018	Championship	David Brooks	MF	Wales	33	3	First player to win in consecutive years	
2019	Championship	Dean Henderson	GK	England	46	0	First loan player from another club to win award.	
2020	Premier League	Dean Henderson	GK	England	40	0		
2021	Premier League	Aaron Ramsdale	GK	England	42	0	Also won the Player of the Year award	
2022	Championship	Morgan Gibbs-White	MF	England	35	11	Also won the Player of the Year award	
2023	Championship	James McAtee	MF	England	36	8		
2024	Premier League	Ollie Arblaster	MF	England	15	0		
2025	Championship	Sydie Peck	MF	England	42	0		
2026	Championship	Andre Brooks	MF	Jamaica	41	6		
