= Andy Scott (footballer, born 1972) =

English footballer and manager

Personal information
- Full name: Andrew Scott
- Date of birth: 2 August 1972 (age 54)
- Place of birth: Epsom, England
- Height: 6 ft 1 in (1.85 m)
- Positions: Forward; utility player

Youth career
- –1991: Wimbledon

Senior career*
Years	Team	Apps	(Gls)
1991–1992	Sutton United		
1992–1997	Sheffield United	75	(6)
1996	→ Chesterfield (loan)	5	(3)
1997	→ Bury (loan)	8	(0)
1997–2001	Brentford	125	(30)
2001–2004	Oxford United	95	(24)
2004–2005	Leyton Orient	47	(10)
Total		355	(73)

Managerial career
- 2007–2011: Brentford
- 2011–2012: Rotherham United
- 2013–2015: Aldershot Town
- * Club domestic league appearances and goals

Andrew Scott (born 2 August 1972) is an English former professional footballer and manager.

During his playing career, Scott played in the Premier League and Football League for Brentford, Oxford United, Sheffield United and Leyton Orient as a forward and utility player. Upon his retirement in 2005, he entered coaching and later managed Brentford, Rotherham United and Aldershot Town. In 2015, he moved into scouting and backroom roles with Brentford, Watford, Swansea City, Nottingham Forest and Charlton Athletic.

== Playing career ==
=== Early years ===
A forward, Scott began his career in the youth system at First Division club Wimbledon, but failed to be awarded a professional contract and dropped into non-League football to join Isthmian League Premier Division club Sutton United in 1991.

=== Sheffield United ===
Along with his brother, Efan Ekoku and Paul Rogers, Scott was one of four Sutton United players to be plucked from non-League football by Sheffield United in the early 1990s. He joined the Bramall Lane club, then members of the Premier League, for a £50,000 fee in December 1992 and made the first professional appearance of his career as an injury time substitute for Brian Deane in a 1–1 Steel City derby draw on 21 April 1993. Scott made his first start for the club versus Chelsea on the final day of the 1992–93 season and had a dream afternoon, playing the full 90 minutes and opening the scoring after seven minutes of the eventual 4–1 victory.

Scott played a bit-part role during the 1993–94 season, at the end of which the Blades were relegated to the First Division. Scott became a regular in the team during the 1994–95 season, making 40 appearances. After the departure of manager Dave Bassett in 1995, he fell out of favour with successive managers Howard Kendall and Nigel Spackman. Following two loans away, Scott departed the club on 21 December 1997. Scott made 87 appearances and scored 11 goals during five years at Bramall Lane.

=== Brentford ===
As one of new manager Micky Adams' first signings, Scott transferred to Second Division strugglers Brentford on 21 November 1997. Joining for a £75,000 fee, the move reunited him with Geoff Taylor, then Director of Youth Football at Griffin Park and previously assistant manager at Sheffield United and youth team manager at Wimbledon. Despite scoring on his debut with a late equaliser in a 1–1 draw with Oldham Athletic, Scott had a difficult start to life at Griffin Park and failed to live up to expectations, scoring just five goals in 27 appearances during the remainder of the 1996-97 season, at the end of which the Bees were relegated to the Third Division. Scott was played on the left wing by new manager Ron Noades during 1998–99, but despite suffering a serious leg injury in November 1998, he had the best season of his career so far, scoring 11 goals in 40 appearances and winning the Third Division championship.

Scott was again a regular back in the Second Division during the 1999–00 season, making 42 appearances and proving his versatility by filling in at left back and in central midfield during the campaign. Scott began the 2000–01 season in his regular left wing role, but deputised up front for the injured Lloyd Owusu and enjoyed the best goalscoring form of his career, with 13 goals in a 21-match spell between late August 2000 and early January 2001. In a bid to balance the club's books, chairman Ron Noades sold Scott and teammate Rob Quinn in January 2001. Scott made 143 appearances and scored 37 goals in just over three years at Griffin Park.

=== Oxford United ===
Scott and Brentford teammate Rob Quinn joined Second Division strugglers Oxford United for a combined £150,000 fee on 12 January 2001. He was unable to prevent the club from suffering relegation to the Third Division at the end of the 2000–01 season, though on a personal note he had had the best season of his career and finished the campaign with 20 goals scored for Brentford and Oxford United. He was the final Oxford United player to score at the Manor Ground. Scott played on for a three further seasons with the Us, but fell out of favour due to injury troubles during the 2003–04 season. He was released on 24 March 2004. During 3 1/2 years with Oxford United, he made 100 appearances and scored 25 goals. At the time of his departure, Scott was the club's PFA representative.

=== Leyton Orient ===
On 24 March 2004, Scott joined struggling Third Division club Leyton Orient on a free transfer. He scored one goal in eight appearances during what remained of the 2003–04 season and despite being aged 32, was a regular in 2004–05 and scored 9 goals in 45 appearances before being forced to retire in April 2005 after being diagnosed with hypertrophic cardiomyopathy. A 2005–06 pre-season friendly was played between Leyton Orient and Brentford to raise money for Scott after his premature retirement.

== Managerial and coaching career ==
=== Leyton Orient ===
After retiring from football in April 2005, Scott began coaching the Leyton Orient youth team, replacing Dean Smith, who moved up to assistant manager. He remained in the role until his departure at the end of the 2006–07 season.

=== Brentford ===
==== 2007–2009 ====
On 9 May 2007, Scott rejoined his former club Brentford, newly relegated to League Two, as assistant to incoming manager Terry Butcher. Following a poor run of results and with a relegation into non-League football a possibility, Butcher was sacked on 11 December 2007 and Scott was named caretaker manager. After three wins, one draw and one loss from his opening five games, Scott was named as the club's permanent manager on 4 January 2008. Seven wins and two draws from a 9-match spell between late December 2007 and mid-February 2008 raised the Bees to 11th position, but hopes of a playoff finish were thwarted by a run of just four wins from the final 15 matches of the season.

Scott signed a new five-year contract during the 2008 off-season and an overhaul of the squad and the shrewd loan signings of goalkeeper Ben Hamer, centre back Alan Bennett and forwards Jordan Rhodes and Billy Clarke contributed to Brentford winning the 2008–09 League Two championship in Scott's first full season in management. During the season he was named the 2008 BBC Radio London Manager of the Year and won the April 2009 League Two Manager of the Month award. The title win made Scott the first person to win a league championship as both a player and manager of Brentford.

==== 2009–2011 ====
Scott again overhauled the squad for the 2009–10 season in League One and he again showed prowess in the loan market, signing young Arsenal goalkeeper Wojciech Szczęsny, up-and-coming teenage attacker John Bostock and future stalwart Toumani Diagouraga. Just six defeats between early December and the end of the season led to a strong 9th-place finish.

Scott's Brentford had a torrid start to the 2010–11 season and sat bottom of the table after just two wins from the opening 11 matches. The early months of the season were notable for a run to the fourth round of the League Cup, which featured wins over Championship club Hull City and Premier League Everton on penalties at Griffin Park, before the run ended with a loss in a penalty shootout away to Premier League side Birmingham City. The team's league form subsequently picked up and Scott won the October 2010 League One Manager of the Month award. In the same period, Scott felt the need to address the atmosphere surrounding the club, stating "we are closing ranks. There's a lot of negativity around the place and I'm sick of it. We've beaten Plymouth, Peterborough, Charlton, Hull and Everton and taken Birmingham to penalties – it's a terrible season we're having!". Scott also guided Brentford to the Southern Area finals of the Football League Trophy, but a winless run in league matches in January 2011 saw Scott and his assistant Terry Bullivant sacked two days after a 4–1 away defeat to Dagenham & Redbridge on 1 February. In recognition of his achievements as a player and manager with Brentford, Scott was inducted into the club's Hall of Fame in November 2024.

=== Rotherham United ===
On 13 April 2011, Scott was named manager of League Two club Rotherham United on a three-year contract. He immediately made wholesale changes to the squad and instigated changes to the youth setup and the training ground. Four wins and one draw during the opening month of the 2011–12 season led to him winning the August 2011 League Two Manager of the Month award. With the club in 11th position in the table, Scott was sacked on 19 March 2012.

=== Aldershot Town ===
On 22 February 2013, Scott took over as manager of League Two club Aldershot Town on a deal until the end of the 2012–13 season. Scott and his assistant Terry Bullivant were unable to save the Shots from relegation to the Conference Premier and the subsequent entry into administration. Despite Aldershot residing in the relegation places in October 2013, the pair signed new three-year contracts. A 19th-place finish was achieved at the end of the 2013–14 season, but with the club six points above the relegation zone, Scott and Bullivant were sacked on 21 January 2015.

In August 2022, Scott revealed that he would not return to football management and that he had been "in management for a reason and that was to develop players, organise teams and get everyone playing the way I wanted to play. Realistically, where I was going to go after Aldershot was scrambling around at that level, I didn't want to be a journeyman manager applying for every job. Now I'm forging out a new career where I'm fortunate to be in the position I am in".

== Backroom roles ==
=== Brentford ===
In early 2015, Scott resumed his association with Brentford, when he began scouting for it and its partner club FC Midtjylland on behalf of Smartodds, a sports betting company owned by Brentford owner Matthew Benham. On 1 July 2016, Scott officially returned to Brentford, as chief scout. After a re-structuring of the backroom, Scott became the club's Head of Recruitment in July 2016. He left the club in November 2017.

=== Watford ===
On 13 November 2017, Scott joined Premier League club Watford as the club's UK Football Recruitment Director, working under Technical Director Filippo Giraldi. He was promoted into the role of Sporting Director in November 2018 and stayed in the role until April 2019.

=== Swansea City ===
On 24 July 2019, Scott was appointed Head of Recruitment at Championship club Swansea City. As a result of structural changes at the club, he departed the role by mutual consent on 6 December 2021.

=== Nottingham Forest ===
In January 2022, Scott was appointed Head of Scouting at Championship club Nottingham Forest. The move reunited Scott with Steve Cooper, who served as head coach during Scott's tenure as Head of Recruitment at Swansea City. Scott and Head of Recruitment George Syrianos were sacked on 11 October 2022.

=== Charlton Athletic ===
On 20 December 2022, Scott was named technical director of League One club Charlton Athletic on an interim basis. The failure of a proposed takeover of the club led to Scott's departure on 10 February 2023, but he was reappointed to the role in July 2023. Scott departed the club on 14 February 2025.

== Personal life ==
Scott is the elder brother of Rob Scott. He attended Wilson's School in Wallington and studied Sports Studies at university. Scott is a patron of Cardiac Risk in the Young.

== Career statistics ==
Appearances and goals by club, season and competition
Club	Season	League			National cup (Note: Includes FA Cup)		League cup (Note: Includes EFL Cup)		Other		Total	
Club	Season	Division	Apps	Goals	Apps	Goals	Apps	Goals	Apps	Goals	Apps	Goals
Sheffield United	1992–93	Premier League	2	1	—		—		—		2	1
Sheffield United	1993–94	Premier League	15	1	0	0	1	0	—		16	1
Sheffield United	1994–95	First Division	37	4	1	0	2	1	—		40	5
Sheffield United	1996–97	First Division	8	1	1	0	0	0	0	0	9	1
Sheffield United	1997–98	First Division	6	0	0	0	2	0	—		8	0
Sheffield United	Total		75	6	3	0	5	2	4	3	87	11
Chesterfield (loan)	1996–97	Second Division	5	3	—		—		—		5	3
Bury (loan)	1996–97	Second Division	8	0	—		—		—		8	0
Brentford	1997–98	Second Division	26	5	0	0	—		1 (Note: Appearance(s) in Football League Trophy)	0	27	5
Brentford	1998–99	Third Division	34	7	0	0	4	2	2	2	40	11
Brentford	1999–00	Second Division	36	3	2	0	2	0	2	1	42	4
Brentford	2000–01	Second Division	22	13	1	0	3	2	1	0	27	13
Brentford	Total		125	30	3	0	9	4	6	3	143	37
Oxford United	2000–01	Second Division	21	7	—		—		—		21	7
Oxford United	2001–02	Third Division	30	8	0	0	1	1	0	0	31	9
Oxford United	2002–03	Third Division	38	11	1	0	2	0	0	0	41	11
Oxford United	2003–04	Third Division	6	0	0	0	1	0	0	0	7	0
Oxford United	Total		95	24	1	0	4	1	0	0	100	25
Leyton Orient	2003–04	Third Division	8	1	—		—		—		8	1
Leyton Orient	2004–05	League Two	39	9	2	0	1	0	3	0	45	9
Leyton Orient	Total		47	10	2	0	1	0	3	0	53	10
Career total			355	73	9	0	19	0	13	6	396	79

== Managerial statistics ==
Managerial record by team and tenure
Team	From	To	Record					Ref.
Team	From	To	P	W	D	L	Win %	Ref.
Brentford	11 December 2007	3 February 2011	168	64	55	49	38.1	
Rotherham United	14 April 2011	19 March 2012	46	15	14	17	32.6	
Aldershot Town	22 February 2013	21 January 2015	103	33	28	42	32.0	
Total			317	112	97	108	35.3	

== Honours ==
=== As a player ===
Brentford

- Football League Third Division: 1998–99

=== As a manager ===
Brentford

- Football League Two: 2008–09

=== As an individual ===
- Football League One Manager of the Month: October 2010
- Football League Two Manager of the Month: April 2009, August 2011
- Brentford Hall of Fame
