= Tommy Hoyland =

English footballer (1932–2023)

Personal information
- Full name: Thomas Hoyland
- Date of birth: 14 June 1932
- Place of birth: Sheffield, England
- Date of death: 4 October 2023 (aged 91)
- Position: Wing half

Senior career*
| Years | Team | Apps | (Gls) |
| 1949–1961 | Sheffield United | 181 | (18) |
| 1961–1963 | Bradford City | 27 | (6) |
- Retford Town
| Total | | 208 | (24) |
- * Club domestic league appearances and goals

Thomas Hoyland (14 June 1932 – 4 October 2023) was an English professional footballer who played as a wing half.

== Career ==
Born in Sheffield, Hoyland played for Sheffield United, Bradford City and Retford Town.

== Personal life and death ==
Hoyland died on 4 October 2023, at the age of 91.

His son, Jamie Hoyland played for Sheffield United from 1990 to 1994.
