= Aaron Ramsdale =

English footballer (born 1998)

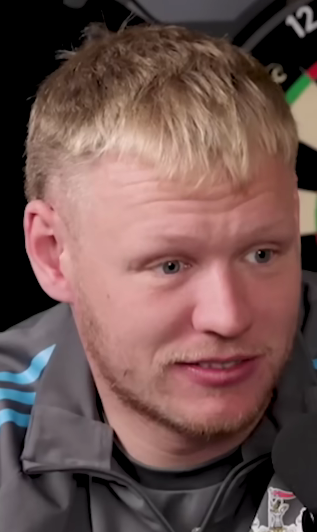
- Ramsdale in 2026

Personal information
- Full name: Aaron Christopher Ramsdale
- Date of birth: 14 May 1998 (age 28)
- Place of birth: Stoke-on-Trent, England
- Height: 6 ft 3 in (1.90 m)
- Position: Goalkeeper

Team information
- Current team: Southampton
- Number: 32

Youth career
- Marsh Town
- Bolton Wanderers
- 2013–2015: Sheffield United

Senior career*
| Years | Team | Apps | (Gls) |
| 2015–2017 | Sheffield United | 0 | (0) |
| 2015 | → Worksop Town (loan) | 1 | (0) |
| 2017–2020 | Bournemouth | 37 | (0) |
| 2018 | → Chesterfield (loan) | 19 | (0) |
| 2019 | → AFC Wimbledon (loan) | 20 | (0) |
| 2020–2021 | Sheffield United | 40 | (0) |
| 2021–2024 | Arsenal | 78 | (0) |
| 2024– | Southampton | 30 | (0) |
| 2025–2026 | → Newcastle United (loan) | 12 | (0) |

International career^{‡}
| 2016 | England U18 | 2 | (0) |
| 2016–2017 | England U19 | 12 | (0) |
| 2017–2018 | England U20 | 5 | (0) |
| 2018–2021 | England U21 | 15 | (0) |
| 2021–2024 | England | 5 | (0) |
Medal record
Men's football
Representing England
UEFA European Championship
| Runner-up | 2020 Europe | Team |
| Runner-up | 2024 Germany | Team |
UEFA European Under-19 Championship
| Winner | 2017 Georgia | U-19 Team |
- * Club domestic league appearances and goals as of 05:38, 19 April 2026 (UTC) ‡ National team caps and goals as of 23:20, 7 June 2024 (UTC)

Aaron Christopher Ramsdale (born 14 May 1998) Is an English professional footballer who plays as a goalkeeper for EFL Championship club Southampton.

Ramsdale began his senior club career playing for Sheffield United and signed for Bournemouth in 2017. Following successive loans to Chesterfield and AFC Wimbledon, Ramsdale played a season with Bournemouth and re-joined Sheffield United in a transfer worth an initial £18 million. In 2021, Ramsdale signed for Arsenal in a club record transfer worth up to £30 million, becoming their most expensive goalkeeper. He would be the Gunners' first choice keeper for the next two seasons, before being relegated to the backup role during 2023–24. In 2024, Ramsdale signed for Southampton, who were in their first year back in the Premier League after a one-year absence, for a fee of around £25 million. In August 2025, Ramsdale joined Newcastle United on a season-long loan following Southampton's return to the EFL Championship.

Ramsdale has represented England at all levels from under-18 to the senior team, and won the UEFA European Under-19 Championship in 2017. He was in the squad that finished as runners-up at both UEFA Euro 2020 and 2024, and the squad at the 2022 FIFA World Cup.

== Early life ==
Aaron Christopher Ramsdale was born on 14 May 1998 in Stoke-on-Trent, Staffordshire, and was raised in the nearby village of Chesterton. Ramsdale began his career at Newcastle-under-Lyme-based club Marsh Town. Goalkeeping coach Fred Barber took him up to Bolton Wanderers for a trial and they ended up signing him. In 2014, Ramsdale was identified by The Sentinel as a future prospect after helping his school, Sir Thomas Boughey High School, to reach the English Schools' FA Cup semi-final.

== Club career ==
=== Sheffield United ===
In 2013, Ramsdale joined Sheffield United after time spent in the Bolton Wanderers youth team. After graduating from Sheffield United's youth academy, Ramsdale signed a scholarship with the club in May 2014. In December 2015, he briefly joined Northern Counties East Football League Premier Division club Worksop Town on loan, playing one match while their regular goalkeeper was suspended. After returning to the Blades, Ramsdale appeared twice as an unused substitute during the 2015–16 season against Coventry City and Scunthorpe United. In May 2016, he signed his first professional contract with the club.

Ramsdale made his professional debut starting in a 6–0 home victory over Leyton Orient in the FA Cup, keeping a clean sheet in the process. He also made another appearance in the FA Cup against Bolton Wanderers but lost 3–2.

=== Bournemouth ===
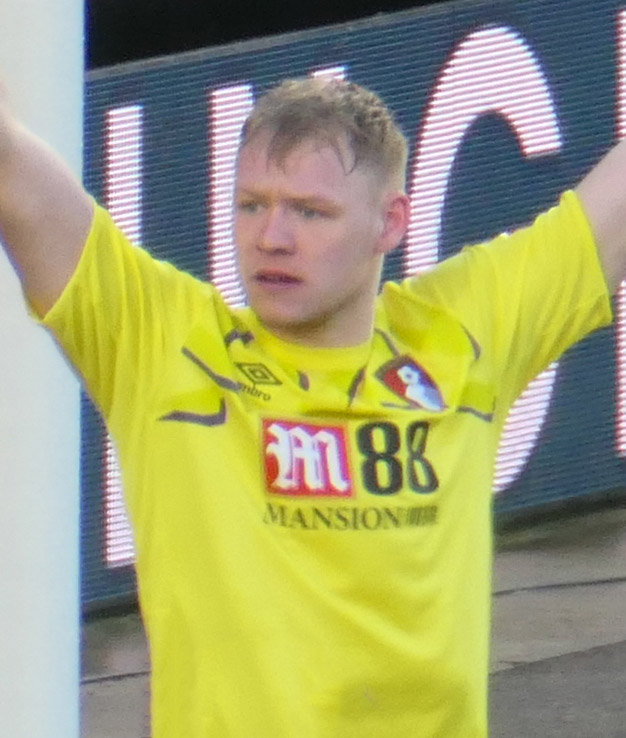
Ramsdale playing for AFC Bournemouth in 2020

On 31 January 2017, Ramsdale was signed by Premier League club Bournemouth for an undisclosed fee believed to be in the region of £800,000. He was on the bench for the final game of the 2016–17 season against Leicester City.

==== Loans to Chesterfield and Wimbledon ====
In the January 2018 transfer window, Ramsdale was loaned out to Chesterfield for the rest of the 2017–18 season. Ramsdale made his Chesterfield debut against Accrington Stanley on 6 January 2018, but scored an own goal after he "allowed a seemingly harmless Jackson strike from the right to squirm into the net", in a 4–0 loss. A week later, against Luton Town, he kept a clean sheet in a 2–0 win. In the 2017–18 season, Ramsdale made 19 appearances in total for the club in League Two, but was ultimately unable to help prevent the club from suffering relegation to the National League.

On 4 January 2019, Ramsdale joined AFC Wimbledon on loan until the end of the 2018–19 season. The next day, Ramsdale made his debut for the Dons in a 3–2 FA Cup third round victory over Fleetwood Town at the Highbury Stadium in Fleetwood. His league debut came a week later in a 1–1 draw with Coventry City at the Ricoh Arena. He helped the club defeat West Ham in the FA Cup. In the 2018–19 season, Ramsdale made 20 appearances in total for the club in League One, and in doing so he won the club's Young Player of the Season Award for his performances in goal, as Wimbledon achieved survival in League One despite being 10 points from safety in February.

==== Return to Bournemouth ====
Ramsdale made both his Premier League debut and his full debut for Bournemouth on the opening day of the 2019–20 season, in a 1–1 draw against former team Sheffield United. Ramsdale established himself as Bournemouth's first choice keeper in the first few months of the 2019–20 season, starting every Premier League game for the club until 12 January, when he missed the match against Watford due to injury. He returned to the team in the next Premier League game, a 1–0 loss to Norwich City.

He signed a new, long-term contract with the club in October 2019. That same month, Ramsdale's form saw him win the club's Player of the Month award for October, keeping clean sheets in the games against Norwich City and Watford. His form continued in the next few months, as he again picked up the club's Player of the Month award in January for another string of excellent performances, including a Man of the Match winning display against Brighton & Hove Albion. On 10 August, Ramsdale was named Player of the Year by the club's supporters.

=== Return to Sheffield United ===
On 19 August 2020, Ramsdale rejoined Sheffield United, for a reported fee of £18.5 million on a four-year deal. In May 2021, he was named Sheffield United's Player of the Year and Young Player of the Year after being ever present between the sticks all season.

=== Arsenal ===
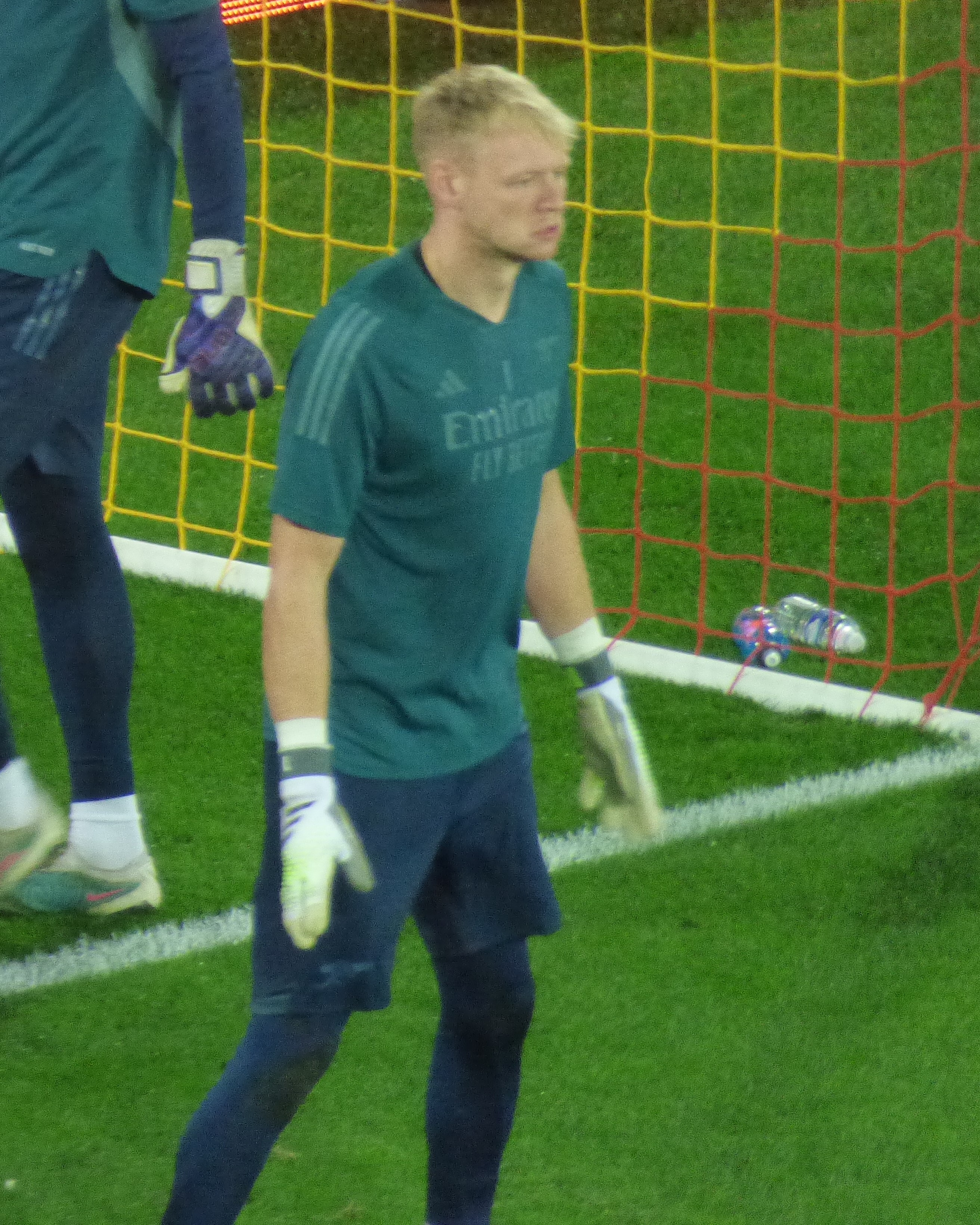
Ramsdale warming up for Arsenal in 2023

On 20 August 2021, Ramsdale signed for Premier League club Arsenal on a long-term contract. He made his debut away to West Bromwich Albion in the 2021–22 EFL Cup five days later, and kept a clean sheet as Arsenal won 6–0. He made his Premier League debut on 11 September and kept another clean sheet as Arsenal defeated Norwich City 1–0 at the Emirates Stadium. After a run of clean sheets in the league, he conceded his first goal in a 3–1 home win against Tottenham Hotspur in the North London derby on 26 September. In a 2–0 away win against Leicester City on 30 October, he was highly praised for one of his saves and overall performance by pundits including former Manchester United goalkeeper Peter Schmeichel, who described his save from a James Maddison free kick as the "best save I've seen for years". In November 2021, following a string of impressive performances, Ramsdale was one of eight players to be nominated for the Premier League's Player of the Month Award for October, though it was eventually awarded to Liverpool's Mohamed Salah. He was also named Arsenal's Player of the Month for October 2021, with 60% of the votes from the club's supporters. He won the award again in November with 42% of the votes. Following the departure of Bernd Leno at the beginning of the 2022–23 season, Ramsdale took the number one shirt at Arsenal.

On 15 January 2023, Ramsdale was the subject of an incident when a Tottenham fan tried to kick him in the back following Arsenal's 2–0 win against Tottenham in the North London derby. Afterwards, the FA confirmed that they were working together with the relevant authorities and the clubs to ensure that appropriate action was taken. Two days later, a 35-year-old man from Hackney was charged with assault and throwing a missile onto the pitch. A month later, he was given a four-year football banning order and was handed a 12-month community order.

On 13 March, Ramsdale won the Goalkeeper of the Year award at the 2023 London Football Awards. He won the Premier League Save of the Month award for the first time in March 2023 for his save from Dango Ouattara against his former club Bournemouth. On 9 April, he made two late saves in stoppage time against Liverpool to maintain a 2–2 draw at Anfield, Arsenal's first point at Liverpool since a 3–3 draw in January 2016. Ramsdale was named in the Premier League PFA Team of the Year at the end of the 2022–23 season.

In the beginning of the 2023–24 season, Arsenal's manager Mikel Arteta promoted new signing David Raya to the starting team, relegating Ramsdale to the bench. On 12 December, Ramsdale made his UEFA Champions League debut in Arsenal's final group stage match, a 1–1 draw against PSV Eindhoven. On 9 March, Ramsdale made his first Premier League appearance of the year in a match against Brentford. He was at fault in the first half when Yoane Wissa scored after blocking Ramsdale's attempted clearance, but was praised by his manager for responding with an improved second-half performance as Arsenal won 2–1.

=== Southampton ===
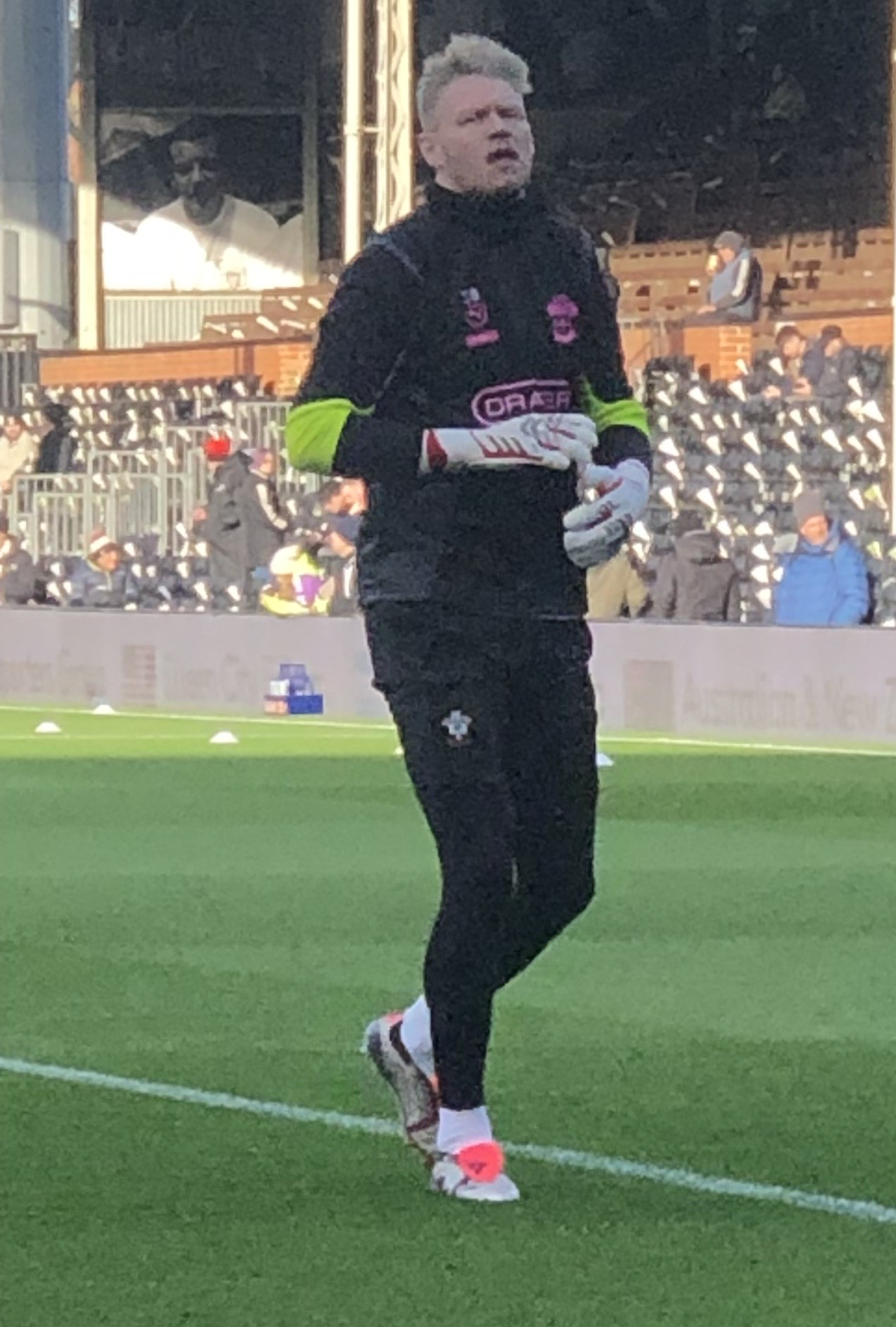
Ramsdale warming up for Southampton in 2024

On 30 August 2024, Ramsdale joined Premier League club Southampton on a four-year contract for a reported fee of £25 million. He made his debut for the club on 31 August in a 3–1 away defeat against Brentford. In November, Ramsdale had an operation on his finger and was sidelined for several weeks.

==== Newcastle United (loan) ====
On 2 August 2025, Ramsdale joined Newcastle United on a season-long loan. He made his league debut for the club on 9 November in a 3–1 defeat against Brentford after coming on as a substitute for the injured Nick Pope in the 77th minute.

==== Return to Southampton ====
On 2 June 2026, Newcastle announced the player would be returning to Southampton at the end of the loan. This left Ramsdale as effectively Southampton's fourth choice goalkeeper, behind Daniel Peretz, George Long and Jamie Jones.

== International career ==
=== Youth ===
Ramsdale has represented England at Under 18, Under 19, Under 20 and Under 21 level.

He was first called up by England U18 in March 2016 and made his debut for the team in a 4–1 win over Republic of Ireland U18 on 27 March 2016. He went on to make two appearances for the England U18 team.

In August 2016, Ramsdale was called up by England U19, where he made his debut on 4 September 2016, in a 1–0 loss against Belgium U19. Ramsdale started all five games for the England under-19 team that won the 2017 UEFA European Under-19 Championship and kept three clean sheets in five matches during the tournament.

After winning the UEFA European U19-Championship, Ramsdale was called up by England U20 in August 2017, where he made his debut on 4 September 2017, in a 0–0 draw against Switzerland U20.

On 18 May 2018, Ramsdale received a call up to England U21s for the first time by Manager Aidy Boothroyd, for the Toulon Tournament. Ramsdale received his first cap for the England U21 team on 1 June 2018, playing the full 90 minutes in a 4–0 win against Qatar. Ramsdale was first choice goalkeeper during qualifiers for the 2021 UEFA European Under-21 Championship and also started all three games for England as they were eliminated at the group stage of that tournament.

=== Senior ===
On 25 May 2021, Ramsdale was called up as part of Gareth Southgate's 33-man provisional senior squad for the delayed UEFA Euro 2020. He was not named in the final 26-man squad, with goalkeepers Dean Henderson, Sam Johnstone and Jordan Pickford being selected ahead of him, but was called up to the squad one game into the tournament after Henderson withdrew with an injury. Ramsdale made his debut for the senior squad starting in a 10–0 away victory against San Marino during the 2022 World Cup qualifiers on 15 November 2021. In November 2022, Ramsdale was named in Gareth Southgate's 26-man squad for the 2022 FIFA World Cup held in Qatar. He was named in England's 26-man squad for UEFA Euro 2024.

== Personal life ==
Ramsdale is a West Bromwich Albion fan, and cited an admiration for their former goalkeeper Ben Foster when he played against him in 2019.

In August 2022, Ramsdale announced his engagement to Georgina Irwin. In June 2023, they announced that they were expecting their first child together. The couple got married later that month. Their first child, a son was born in October later that year. Their second child was born in 2026.

In August 2023, Ramsdale, whose brother is gay, said he would begin calling out homophobia in football. Ramsdale also revealed that his wife had suffered a miscarriage shortly after the 2022 FIFA World Cup and three days before he played in the North London Derby.

== Career statistics ==
=== Club ===
As of match played 18 April 2026

Appearances and goals by club, season and competition
| Club | Season | League | | | FA Cup | | EFL Cup | | Europe | | Other | | Total | |
| Club | Season | Division | Apps | Goals | Apps | Goals | Apps | Goals | Apps | Goals | Apps | Goals | Apps | Goals |
|---|---|---|---|---|---|---|---|---|---|---|---|---|---|---|
| Sheffield United | 2015–16 | League One | 0 | 0 | 0 | 0 | 0 | 0 | — | | 0 | 0 | 0 | 0 |
| Sheffield United | 2016–17 | League One | 0 | 0 | 2 | 0 | 0 | 0 | — | | 0 | 0 | 2 | 0 |
| Sheffield United | Total | | 0 | 0 | 2 | 0 | 0 | 0 | — | | 0 | 0 | 2 | 0 |
| Worksop Town (loan) | 2015–16 | NCEFL Premier Division | 1 | 0 | — | | — | | — | | — | | 1 | 0 |
| Bournemouth | 2016–17 | Premier League | 0 | 0 | — | | — | | — | | — | | 0 | 0 |
| Bournemouth | 2019–20 | Premier League | 37 | 0 | 0 | 0 | 0 | 0 | — | | — | | 37 | 0 |
| Bournemouth | Total | | 37 | 0 | 0 | 0 | 0 | 0 | — | | — | | 37 | 0 |
| Chesterfield (loan) | 2017–18 | League Two | 19 | 0 | — | | — | | — | | — | | 19 | 0 |
| AFC Wimbledon (loan) | 2018–19 | League One | 20 | 0 | 3 | 0 | — | | — | | — | | 23 | 0 |
| Sheffield United | 2020–21 | Premier League | 38 | 0 | 4 | 0 | 0 | 0 | — | | — | | 42 | 0 |
| Sheffield United | 2021–22 | Championship | 2 | 0 | — | | 0 | 0 | — | | — | | 2 | 0 |
| Sheffield United | Total | | 40 | 0 | 4 | 0 | 0 | 0 | — | | — | | 44 | 0 |
| Arsenal | 2021–22 | Premier League | 34 | 0 | 0 | 0 | 3 | 0 | — | | — | | 37 | 0 |
| Arsenal | 2022–23 | Premier League | 38 | 0 | 0 | 0 | 0 | 0 | 3 (Note: Appearances in UEFA Europa League) | 0 | — | | 41 | 0 |
| Arsenal | 2023–24 | Premier League | 6 | 0 | 1 | 0 | 2 | 0 | 1 (Note: Appearance(s) in UEFA Champions League) | 0 | 1 (Note: Appearance in FA Community Shield) | 0 | 11 | 0 |
| Arsenal | Total | | 78 | 0 | 1 | 0 | 5 | 0 | 4 | 0 | 1 | 0 | 89 | 0 |
| Southampton | 2024–25 | Premier League | 30 | 0 | 1 | 0 | 1 | 0 | — | | — | | 32 | 0 |
| Southampton | 2026–27 | Championship | 0 | 0 | 0 | 0 | 0 | 0 | — | | — | | 0 | 0 |
| Southampton | Total | | 30 | 0 | 1 | 0 | 1 | 0 | — | | — | | 32 | 0 |
| Newcastle United (loan) | 2025–26 | Premier League | 12 | 0 | 3 | 0 | 4 | 0 | 4 | 0 | — | | 23 | 0 |
| Career total | | | 237 | 0 | 14 | 0 | 10 | 0 | 8 | 0 | 1 | 0 | 270 | 0 |

=== International ===
As of match played 7 June 2024

Appearances and goals by national team and year
| National team | Year | Apps | Goals |
|---|---|---|---|
| England | 2021 | 1 | 0 |
| England | 2022 | 2 | 0 |
| England | 2023 | 1 | 0 |
| England | 2024 | 1 | 0 |
| Total | | 5 | 0 |

== Honours ==
Arsenal

- FA Community Shield: 2023

England U19

- UEFA European Under-19 Championship: 2017

England U21

- Toulon Tournament: 2018

England

- UEFA European Championship runner-up: 2020, 2024

Individual

- AFC Bournemouth Supporters' Player of the Year: 2019–20
- Sheffield United Player of the Year: 2020–21
- Sheffield United Young Player of the Year: 2020–21
- London Football Awards Goalkeeper of the Year: 2023
- Premier League Save of the Month: March 2023, April 2023, March 2026
- PFA Team of the Year: 2022–23 Premier League
