= Paul Beesley =

English footballer (born 1965)

Personal information
- Full name: Paul Beesley
- Date of birth: 21 July 1965 (age 61)
- Place of birth: Liverpool, England
- Height: 6 ft 1 in (1.85 m)
- Positions: Centre-back; left-back

Youth career
- Marine

Senior career*
Years	Team	Apps	(Gls)
1984–1989	Wigan Athletic	155	(3)
1989–1990	Leyton Orient	32	(1)
1990–1995	Sheffield United	168	(7)
1995–1997	Leeds United	22	(0)
1997–1998	Manchester City	13	(0)
1997–1998	→ Port Vale (loan)	5	(0)
1998	→ West Bromwich Albion (loan)	8	(0)
1998–1999	Port Vale	35	(3)
1999–2000	Blackpool	18	(0)
2000–2001	Chester City	33	(2)
2001–2002	Stalybridge Celtic	26	(0)
2002	Ballymena United		(0)
Total		515	(16)

International career
2001	England C	1	(0)
- * Club domestic league appearances and goals

Paul Beesley (born 21 July 1965) is an English former footballer who played primarily as a centre back.

Beesley began his career at Wigan Athletic in September 1984, before he was sold to Leyton Orient for £175,000 in October 1989. He joined Sheffield United for £300,000 in July 1990 and was voted Player of the Year at the Premier League club in 1993. He was sold to Leeds United in August 1995 for a £250,000 fee before moving on to Manchester City in February 1997 for £500,000. He had brief loan spells at Port Vale and West Bromwich Albion before he was allowed to join Port Vale permanently in July 1999. He joined Chester City in the Conference in July 2000. He was voted the club's Player of the Season before he signed with Stalybridge Celtic in October 2001. He later finished his career in Northern Ireland with Ballymena United. He later coached at Notts County and Leeds United.

== Career ==
=== Wigan Athletic and Leyton Orient ===
Beesley joined Wigan Athletic in September 1984, where he would spend five seasons playing in the then Third Division. He played 185 games in all competitions in five years at Springfield Park, before joining Leyton Orient for £175,000 in October 1989. A first-team regular, Beesley played 35 league and cup games at Brisbane Road in 1989–90, helping Orient to finish comfortably in mid-table in the Third Division under Frank Clark.

=== Sheffield United ===
Beesley was sold to Sheffield United for £300,000 in July 1990, at the time the highest fee paid for a player by the Blades. A regular in the first-team he was instrumental in keeping United in the First Division in 1990–91 after their promotion from the Second Division the previous year. He played 49 times in 1992–93 as the club finished 14th in the inaugural season of Premier League football and reached the semi-finals of the FA Cup. A dependable player he was popular with the fans and was voted Player of the Year in 1993.

Now no longer an automatic choice at centre back he was instead often asked to fill in at left back as the Blades struggled unsuccessfully against relegation the following season, and failed to make an immediate return in 1994–95. He eventually left Bramall Lane having made a total of 195 league and cup appearances in five seasons.

=== Leeds United ===
It came as some surprise when Beesley was sold to Leeds United in August 1995 for a £250,000 fee. He was used mainly as a back-up player by manager Howard Wilkinson during his time at Elland Road, starting just 19 top-flight games in close to two seasons at the club. Unable to dislodge either Lucas Radebe or David Wetherall, new boss George Graham looked to offload Beesley in 1996–97.

=== Manchester City ===
Beesley's next move was to Manchester City in February 1997 for £500,000, rejoining his former boss at Orient, Frank Clark. He played six First Division games for the Sky Blues in 1996–97 but quickly fell out of favour at Maine Road after Joe Royle succeeded Clark as manager. Beesley spent December of the 1997–98 season on loan at Port Vale where he made five appearances before returning to Manchester, and ended the campaign on loan at West Bromwich Albion, playing eight First Division games for the Baggies.

=== Port Vale and Blackpool ===
Released by City, Beesley was allowed to join Port Vale on a free transfer in August 1998, where he was disciplined by the Football Association after he picked up 12 yellow cards in 36 games during 1998–99. He left Vale Park after new manager Brian Horton took charge, and signed with Blackpool in July 1999. However, Beesley's best days were behind him, and he made only 18 appearances as the Tangerines were relegated to the Third Division at the end of the 1999–2000 campaign.

=== Chester City ===
Beesley signed with Chester City in July 2000, with then manager Graham Barrow describing him as "an outstanding professional". Playing more regularly than he had done at his previous club, he was voted Player of the Season for 2000–01 by the Seals fans after his organizational skills helped Chester to boast the lowest goals conceded tally in the Conference. Despite this owner Terry Smith criticised Beesley for his positional play in an FA Trophy semi-final clash with Canvey Island and banished him to scouting duties – a decision Beesley described as "unexplainable".

=== Staylybridge Celtic and Ballymena United ===
Beesley moved on to Stalybridge Celtic in October 2001 where he played 26 times and was described as "magnificent all season" by manager Paul Futcher. However, the club failed to avoid relegation out of the Conference in 2001–02. Beesley left, finishing his career in Northern Ireland with Ballymena United.

== Later life ==
Beesley worked as a youth team coach at Notts County, before he was appointed under-18 coach at Leeds United for a brief spell in 2007. In 2012 he was appointed as the kit man at Ipswich Town by manager Paul Jewell, before departing the role in July 2015.

== Personal life ==
Beesley's son, Jake, is also a footballer and turned professional at Chesterfield in April 2015.

== Career statistics ==
Appearances and goals by club, season and competition
Club	Season	League			FA Cup		Other		Total	
Club	Season	Division	Apps	Goals	Apps	Goals	Apps	Goals	Apps	Goals
Wigan Athletic	1984–85	Third Division	2	0	0	0	0	0	2	0
Wigan Athletic	1985–86	Third Division	17	0	1	0	3	0	21	0
Wigan Athletic	1986–87	Third Division	39	0	2	0	6	0	47	0
Wigan Athletic	1987–88	Third Division	42	1	2	0	6	0	50	1
Wigan Athletic	1988–89	Third Division	44	2	1	0	5	0	50	2
Wigan Athletic	1989–90	Third Division	11	0	0	0	4	0	15	0
Wigan Athletic	Total		155	3	6	0	24	0	185	3
Leyton Orient	1989–90	Third Division	32	1	1	0	2	1	35	2
Sheffield United	1990–91	First Division	37	1	0	0	6	1	43	2
Sheffield United	1991–92	First Division	40	2	4	0	3	0	47	2
Sheffield United	1992–93	Premier League	39	2	6	1	4	0	49	3
Sheffield United	1993–94	Premier League	25	0	1	0	2	0	28	0
Sheffield United	1994–95	First Division	27	2	0	0	1	0	28	2
Sheffield United	Total		168	7	11	1	16	1	195	9
Leeds United	1995–96	Premier League	10	0	4	0	9	0	23	0
Leeds United	1996–97	Premier League	12	0	1	0	1	0	14	0
Leeds United	Total		22	0	5	0	10	0	37	0
Manchester City	1996–97	First Division	6	0	0	0	0	0	6	0
Manchester City	1997–98	First Division	7	0	0	0	0	0	7	0
Manchester City	Total		13	0	0	0	0	0	13	0
West Bromwich Albion (loan)	1997–98	First Division	8	0	0	0	0	0	8	0
Port Vale	1997–98	First Division	5	0	0	0	0	0	5	0
Port Vale	1998–99	First Division	35	3	1	0	0	0	36	3
Port Vale	Total		40	3	1	0	0	0	41	3
Blackpool	1999–2000	Second Division	18	0	1	0	3	0	22	0
Chester City	2000–01	Conference	33	2	4	1	3	0	40	3
Chester City	2001–02	Conference	0	0	0	0	0	0	0	0
Chester City	Total		33	2	4	1	3	0	40	3
Stalybridge Celtic	2001–02	Conference	26	0	1	0	1	0	28	0
Career total			515	16	30	2	59	2	604	20

== Honours ==
Individual

- Sheffield United F.C. Player of the Year: 1993
- Chester City F.C. Player of the Season: 2000–01
