= Mark Todd (footballer) =

Northern Irish footballer

Personal information
- Full name: Mark Kenneth Todd
- Date of birth: 4 December 1967 (age 58)
- Place of birth: Belfast, Northern Ireland
- Height: 5 ft 5 in (1.65 m)
- Position: Midfielder

Senior career*
Years	Team	Apps	(Gls)
1986–1987	Manchester United	0	(0)
1987–1991	Sheffield United	70	(5)
1990–1991	→ Wolverhampton Wanderers (loan)	7	(0)
1991–1995	Rotherham United	64	(7)
1995–1996	Scarborough	23	(1)
1996	Mansfield Town	12	(0)
1996	Telford United	1	(0)
1996	Stalybridge Celtic	6	(0)
1996–1997	Blyth Spartans	?	(?)
Total		183	(12)

International career
1990	Northern Ireland U23	1	(0)
- * Club domestic league appearances and goals

Mark Kenneth Todd (born 4 December 1967) is a Northern Irish former professional footballer who played in the Football League as a midfielder. Todd played in both legs of the 1986 F.A. Youth Cup final for Manchester United against city rivals Manchester City, but joined Sheffield United before making a first-team appearance for United. He was a member of the Blades team that won back-to-back promotions from the Third Division to the First Division in 1989 and 1990. After retiring from playing, Todd was the head of community development (known as Sheffield United Community Foundation) at former club Sheffield United and since 2021 has been an Academy and European scout for Manchester City.
