= Charlie Hartfield =

English footballer

Personal information
- Date of birth: 4 September 1971 (age 55)
- Place of birth: Lambeth, London, England
- Height: 6 ft 0 in (1.83 m)
- Position: Midfielder

Senior career*
Years	Team	Apps	(Gls)
1989–1991	Arsenal	0	(0)
1991–1997	Sheffield United	57	(1)
1997	→ Fulham (loan)	2	(0)
1997–2001	Swansea City	22	(2)
1997	→ Lincoln City (loan)	3	(1)
1999–2000	→ Telford United (loan)	20	(3)
2002	Halifax Town	2	(2)
2002	Ilkeston Town		
- * Club domestic league appearances and goals

Charlie Hartfield (born 4 September 1971) is an English former professional footballer who played as a midfielder.

He started out at Arsenal, turning professional in 1989, but never made a first-team appearance. He left Arsenal in 1990 for Sheffield United and went on to play for Fulham (on loan), Swansea City, Lincoln City (on loan), Telford United (on loan), Halifax Town and Ilkeston Town.

During his playing career, Hartfield suffered from a gambling addiction, and in 2006 he still owed debts of "£40,000 or £50,000".

Charlie Hartfield most recently worked as a scout for Sheffield United. In February 2015, he was jailed for nine years and one month after admitting conspiracy to supply amphetamine and cannabis.
