= Brian Deane =

English footballer and manager

Personal information
- Full name: Brian Christopher Deane
- Date of birth: 7 February 1968 (age 58)
- Place of birth: Leeds, England
- Height: 6 ft 3 in (1.91 m)
- Position: Striker

Youth career
- Doncaster Rovers

Senior career*
| Years | Team | Apps | (Gls) |
| 1985–1988 | Doncaster Rovers | 66 | (12) |
| 1988–1993 | Sheffield United | 197 | (82) |
| 1993–1997 | Leeds United | 138 | (32) |
| 1997–1998 | Sheffield United | 24 | (11) |
| 1998 | Benfica | 18 | (7) |
| 1998–2001 | Middlesbrough | 87 | (18) |
| 2001–2003 | Leicester City | 52 | (19) |
| 2003–2004 | West Ham United | 26 | (6) |
| 2004–2005 | Leeds United | 31 | (6) |
| 2005 | Sunderland | 4 | (0) |
| 2005 | Perth Glory | 7 | (1) |
| 2005–2006 | Sheffield United | 2 | (0) |
| Total | | 652 | (194) |

International career
| 1991 | England B | 3 | (0) |
| 1991–1992 | England | 3 | (0) |

Managerial career
- 2012–2014: Sarpsborg 08
- * Club domestic league appearances and goals

Brian Christopher Deane (born 7 February 1968) is an English football coach and former player. His most recent managerial position was as the manager of the Norwegian side Sarpsborg 08.

During his playing career, he played as forward from 1985 until 2006. He was the scorer of the first ever goal in the FA Premier League in 1992, when he was a Sheffield United player. Deane also played in the Premier League for Leeds United and Middlesbrough as well as playing top-flight football in Portugal and Australia for Benfica and Perth Glory respectively. He also played in the Football League for Doncaster Rovers, Leicester City (scoring another first goal, this time the first competitive goal at the new Walkers Stadium), West Ham United and Sunderland before finishing his playing career in 2006 with a brief spell back at Sheffield United. Deane was capped three times by England.

== Playing career ==
=== Club career ===
Deane made his debut for Doncaster Rovers in the 1985–86 season and went on to play 66 times for them in the Third Division, scoring 12 goals, before they were relegated at the end of 1987–88 season. He was then sold to Sheffield United, just relegated from the Second Division, for a fee of £25,000. He first appeared for Sheffield United in an 8–1 friendly victory against Skegness Town. His first league goal came in the Third Division in the opening game of the season against Reading but his hero status did not really start until 17 September, when both he and Tony Agana hit hat-tricks in a 6–1 victory over Chester City. It was the first double hat-trick by Blades players since Harry Johnson and Arthur Mercer helped the Blades achieve their record 11–2 victory over Cardiff City on 1 January 1926. His goals helped the Blades win promotion as Third Division runners-up that season, and followed this up with a second successive promotion a year later which saw the club return to the First Division after 14 years away.

In 1990-91, Deane scored 13 goals as the Blades survived their first season back in the First Division. He scored 12 goals the following season to help the Blades finish ninth in the league - their highest finish for 17 years - and comfortably qualify for a place in the new FA Premier League.

Deane scored the first goal in the FA Premier League for Sheffield United against Manchester United after 5 minutes on 15 August 1992. In the same game he scored a second after 50 minutes from the penalty spot as Sheffield United went on to win 2–1. Deane went on to say of the goal, "I found out I had scored the first goal at half-time but it didn't really feel like a big thing at the time." On 16 January 1993, Deane scored a hat-trick against Ipswich Town in a 3–0 league victory, making him one of the first players to score a hat-trick in the Premier League.

He left Sheffield United for Leeds United for £2.9million in June 1993 – a record signing for Leeds and a record sale for the Blades. At the time he was one of the most expensively signed players in English football. He had first been linked with a move to Elland Road 18 months previously. He spent four years at Elland Road, scoring 32 goals in 138 Premier League appearances, enjoying an appearance in the UEFA Cup and collecting a Football League Cup runners-up medal in the 1995–96 season.

In July 1997, Deane returned to Sheffield United for £1.5million as new manager Nigel Spackman prepared to build a promotion winning team. He scored 11 league goals in his second spell with the Blades before Graeme Souness signed him for S.L. Benfica in a £1million deal. In his 18 Portuguese league matches for Benfica, Deane found the net seven times. In October 1998, after nine months in Portugal, he returned to England in a £3million move to Middlesbrough. His second season with Boro saw him score nine Premier League goals, but in 2000–01 the goals dried up and he soon found himself struggling for a place in the first team.

In November 2001, he joined Leicester City, where he scored the first competitive goal at the Walkers Stadium, scoring both goals in a 2–0 victory over Watford. He had scored six goals in 15 Premier League appearances for them the previous season, but his goals weren't enough to stop the Foxes from being relegated. He had been brought to Leicester by Dave Bassett, the man he had played under at Sheffield United a decade earlier, but Bassett had been succeeded as manager by Micky Adams just before relegation was confirmed. He then moved to West Ham United. Here he scored a last minute equaliser against Wigan Athletic on the final day of the 2003–2004 season. This goal sent Crystal Palace into the Division One playoffs at the expense of Wigan, and ironically they beat West Ham in the final. When Deane was brought on as a substitute in the match he received a standing ovation by both sets of fans. After the play-off final he ended up returning for a second spell at Leeds, who had just been relegated from the Premier League with huge debts. He struggled to make an impact in his second period at the club but memorably scored four goals in a 6–1 thrashing of Queens Park Rangers in November 2004.

After a short spell at Sunderland, he signed for Perth Glory in the Australian A-League. He left mid-season after failing to make an impact and sustaining a long-term injury, scoring once in seven appearances. He stated that he did not want to prevent Perth Glory from signing another striker due to salary cap and squad size restrictions imposed by the league. After leaving Perth Glory, Deane re-signed for the third time at Sheffield United making him one of the only players Sheffield United have signed three times. In December 2005 he made two substitute appearances before retiring at the beginning of the 2006–07 season, after the Blades had won promotion back to the Premier League following a 12-year exile.

=== International career ===
Deane won three caps for England whilst with Sheffield United in the early 1990s. His England debut was as a half-time substitute in a tour match against New Zealand at Mount Smart Stadium, Auckland on 3 June 1991. His other England caps were against New Zealand at Athletic Park on 8 June 1991, and against Spain at Estadio El Sardinero, Santander, Cantabria on 9 September 1992.

== Managerial career ==
It was announced on 21 November 2012 that Deane had been appointed as head coach of newly promoted Norwegian top-flight team, Sarpsborg 08 FF. They finished third from bottom in his first season, avoiding relegation after beating Ranheim in play-offs. In his second season the club finished the league campaign in mid-table and were semi-finalists in the Norwegian Football Cup.

In April 2019, Deane joined EFL Championship side Leeds United as a coach for Leeds United Development Hub for elite player development scholarship.

=== Football Club owner ===
On 7 July 2019, Kosovo based Football Superleague of Kosovo side Ferizaj organised a media conference announcing that English and local investors came to the club's new leadership. Included among the investors was also the former England international striker, Brian Deane, who would own 50% of the club's shares.

== Career statistics ==
Appearances and goals by club, season and competition
| Club | Season | League | | | National cup | | League cup | | Other | | Total | |
| Club | Season | Division | Apps | Goals | Apps | Goals | Apps | Goals | Apps | Goals | Apps | Goals |
|---|---|---|---|---|---|---|---|---|---|---|---|---|
| Doncaster Rovers | 1985–86 | Third Division | 3 | 0 | 0 | 0 | 0 | 0 | 0 | 0 | 3 | 0 |
| Doncaster Rovers | 1986–87 | Third Division | 20 | 2 | 1 | 1 | 0 | 0 | 2 (Note: Appearances in Football League Trophy) | 0 | 23 | 3 |
| Doncaster Rovers | 1987–88 | Third Division | 43 | 10 | 2 | 0 | 3 | 0 | 2 | 0 | 50 | 10 |
| Doncaster Rovers | Total | | 66 | 12 | 3 | 1 | 3 | 0 | 4 | 0 | 76 | 13 |
| Sheffield United | 1988–89 | Third Division | 43 | 22 | 7 | 5 | 5 | 3 | 4 (Note: Appearances in Yorkshire & Humberside Cup) | 0 | 59 | 30 |
| Sheffield United | 1989–90 | Second Division | 45 | 21 | 6 | 1 | 2 | 1 | 2 (Note: One appearance, one goal in Full Members' Cup; one appearance in Yorkshire & Humberside Cup) | 1 | 55 | 24 |
| Sheffield United | 1990–91 | First Division | 38 | 13 | 1 | 0 | 4 | 3 | 1 (Note: Appearance in Full Members' Cup) | 1 | 44 | 17 |
| Sheffield United | 1991–92 | First Division | 30 | 12 | 4 | 2 | 1 | 2 | 0 | 0 | 35 | 16 |
| Sheffield United | 1992–93 | Premier League | 41 | 14 | 6 | 3 | 4 | 2 | — | | 51 | 19 |
| Sheffield United | Total | | 197 | 82 | 24 | 11 | 16 | 11 | 7 | 2 | 244 | 106 |
| Leeds United | 1993–94 | Premier League | 41 | 11 | 3 | 1 | 2 | 0 | — | | 46 | 12 |
| Leeds United | 1994–95 | Premier League | 35 | 9 | 3 | 1 | 2 | 0 | — | | 40 | 10 |
| Leeds United | 1995–96 | Premier League | 34 | 7 | 6 | 1 | 7 | 2 | 3 (Note: Appearances in UEFA Cup) | 0 | 50 | 10 |
| Leeds United | 1996–97 | Premier League | 28 | 5 | 4 | 1 | 0 | 0 | — | | 32 | 6 |
| Leeds United | Total | | 138 | 32 | 16 | 4 | 11 | 2 | 3 | 0 | 168 | 38 |
| Sheffield United | 1997–98 | Division One | 24 | 11 | 1 | 0 | 4 | 2 | — | | 29 | 13 |
| Benfica | 1997–98 | Primeira Divisão | 14 | 7 | 3 | 0 | — | | 0 | 0 | 17 | 7 |
| Benfica | 1998–99 | Primeira Divisão | 4 | 0 | — | | — | | 3 (Note: Appearances in UEFA Champions League) | 1 | 7 | 1 |
| Benfica | Total | | 18 | 7 | 3 | 0 | — | | 3 | 1 | 24 | 8 |
| Middlesbrough | 1998–99 | Premier League | 26 | 6 | 1 | 0 | 1 | 0 | — | | 28 | 6 |
| Middlesbrough | 1999–2000 | Premier League | 29 | 9 | 1 | 1 | 3 | 0 | — | | 33 | 10 |
| Middlesbrough | 2000–01 | Premier League | 25 | 2 | 1 | 0 | 1 | 0 | — | | 27 | 2 |
| Middlesbrough | 2001–02 | Premier League | 7 | 1 | 0 | 0 | 0 | 0 | — | | 7 | 1 |
| Middlesbrough | Total | | 87 | 18 | 3 | 1 | 5 | 0 | 0 | 0 | 95 | 19 |
| Leicester City | 2001–02 | Premier League | 15 | 6 | 1 | 0 | — | | — | | 16 | 6 |
| Leicester City | 2002–03 | Division One | 32 | 13 | 1 | 0 | 0 | 0 | — | | 33 | 13 |
| Leicester City | 2003–04 | Premier League | 5 | 0 | — | | 2 | 0 | — | | 7 | 0 |
| Leicester City | Total | | 52 | 19 | 2 | 0 | 2 | 0 | — | | 56 | 19 |
| West Ham United | 2003–04 | Division One | 26 | 6 | 3 | 1 | — | | 3 (Note: Appearances in Division One play-offs) | 0 | 32 | 7 |
| Leeds United | 2004–05 | Championship | 31 | 6 | 0 | 0 | 2 | 1 | — | | 33 | 7 |
| Sunderland | 2004–05 | Championship | 4 | 0 | — | | — | | — | | 4 | 0 |
| Perth Glory | 2005–06 | A-League | 7 | 1 | — | | — | | 0 | 0 | 7 | 1 |
| Sheffield United | 2005–06 | Championship | 2 | 0 | 0 | 0 | — | | — | | 2 | 0 |
| Career total | | | 652 | 194 | 55 | 18 | 43 | 16 | 20 | 3 | 770 | 231 |

== Managerial statistics ==
As of 9 November 2014

| Team | From | To | Competition | Record | | | | | | | |
| Team | From | To | Competition | G | W | D | L | GF | GA | GD | Win % |
|---|---|---|---|---|---|---|---|---|---|---|---|
| Sarpsborg 08 | 21 November 2012 | 9 November 2014 | Tippeligaen | 60 | 18 | 17 | 25 | 81 | 107 | −26 | 30.00 |
| Sarpsborg 08 | 21 November 2012 | 9 November 2014 | Tippeligaen play-offs | 2 | 2 | 0 | 0 | 3 | 0 | +3 | 100.00 |
| Sarpsborg 08 | 21 November 2012 | 9 November 2014 | Norwegian Football Cup | 8 | 6 | 0 | 2 | 24 | 8 | +16 | 75.00 |
| Sarpsborg 08 | 21 November 2012 | 9 November 2014 | Total | 70 | 26 | 17 | 27 | 108 | 115 | −7 | 37.14 |

== Honours ==
Leeds United

- Football League Cup runner-up: 1995–96
