= Brian Gayle =

English footballer

Personal information
- Full name: Brian Wilbert Gayle
- Date of birth: 6 March 1965 (age 61)
- Place of birth: Kingston-on-Thames, England
- Height: 6 ft 1 in (1.85 m)
- Position: Central defender

Senior career*
Years	Team	Apps	(Gls)
1984–1988	Wimbledon	83	(3)
1984	→ Napier City Rovers (loan)		
1988–1990	Manchester City	55	(3)
1990–1991	Ipswich Town	58	(4)
1991–1996	Sheffield United	119	(9)
1996	Exeter City	10	(0)
1996–1997	Rotherham United	20	(0)
1997–1997	Bristol Rovers	23	(0)
1997	→ Exeter City (loan)	0	(0)
1997–1999	Shrewsbury Town	66	(1)
2000–2001	Telford United	27	(0)
Total		461	(20)
- * Club domestic league appearances and goals

Brian Wilbert Gayle (born 6 March 1965) is an English former professional footballer who played as a central defender.

Gayle began his career at Wimbledon as an apprentice, signing a full contract in October 1984. He spent time with New Zealand club Napier City Rovers before breaking into the first team. He helped Wimbledon to the sixth round of the 1987–88 FA Cup, which the club ultimately won, but was given a red card for a foul on Malcolm Allen in the match, against Watford, and did not feature in later rounds. In July 1988, Gayle joined Manchester City for £325,000.

He was transferred to Ipswich Town for £330,000 in January 1990, and then joined Sheffield United in a £750,000 deal in September 1991. While at the Blades, in 1992, Gayle scored an own goal in a match against local rivals Leeds United, which led to a 2–3 defeat. This, coupled with Manchester United losing to Liverpool, gave Leeds the First Division title.
