= John Pemberton (footballer) =

English footballer

Personal information
- Full name: John Matthew Pemberton
- Date of birth: 18 November 1964 (age 61)
- Place of birth: Oldham, England
- Height: 5 ft 11 in (1.80 m)
- Position: Defender

Youth career
- 19??–1983: Manchester United

Senior career*
Years	Team	Apps	(Gls)
1983–1984	Chadderton		
1984–1985	Rochdale	1	(0)
1985–1988	Crewe Alexandra	121	(1)
1988–1990	Crystal Palace	78	(2)
1990–1993	Sheffield United	68	(0)
1993–1997	Leeds United	53	(0)
1997–1999	Crewe Alexandra	1	(0)
Total		322	(3)

Managerial career
- 2008–2009: Nottingham Forest (caretaker)
- 2010–2012: Sheffield United (academy)
- 2013: Bristol City (caretaker)
- 2016: Bristol City (caretaker)
- 2018–2019: Chesterfield (academy)
- 2018–2019: Chesterfield (caretaker)
- 2019: Kidderminster Harriers
- 2020: Chesterfield
- * Club domestic league appearances and goals

John Matthew Pemberton (born 18 November 1964) is an English football manager and former professional footballer.

As a player, Pemberton played as a defender and made more than 300 appearances in The Football League and the Premier League playing as a defender for Rochdale, Crewe Alexandra, Crystal Palace, Sheffield United and Leeds United. He is also a former manager of Nottingham Forest's reserve team, and spent a brief period as interim manager of the club's first team.

He was most recently the manager of Chesterfield, where he was also the manager of the club's academy during the 2018–19 season, as well as standing in as first-team manager after the dismissal of Martin Allen. He left Chesterfield due to mutual consent in November 2020. He has also managed Kidderminster Harriers, served as caretaker manager at Nottingham Forest and Bristol City, and was Academy Manager at Sheffield United from 2010 to 2012.

== Playing career ==
Born in Oldham, Lancashire, Pemberton started his career as a junior at Manchester United but was released in June 1983. He signed for Chadderton, then Rochdale before moving to Crewe Alexandra in 1985. He initially came to prominence when he joined Crystal Palace in 1988, helping them win promotion to the First Division in 1989. He appeared for Palace in the 1990 FA Cup Final against Manchester United. The initial tie was drawn 3–3 after extra time, with United winning the replay 1–0 after extra time.

In 1990, Pemberton transferred to Sheffield United. During his début against Liverpool in the season opener, he was forced to play in goal after an injury to Simon Tracey. His most memorable moment came in 1993 when he scored the winning penalty in the shootout against Blackburn Rovers in the quarter-final replay in the FA Cup. The following summer, he was sold to Yorkshire rivals Leeds United. Pemberton became something of a cult figure at Leeds owing to his determination and high work-rate. He appeared in a second Wembley final when he played for Leeds in the 1996 League Cup Final against Aston Villa; again, unfortunately for Pemberton, his side was defeated.

He ended his career back at Crewe Alexandra with two appearances in the 1997–98 season.

== Managerial career ==
Pemberton coached Nottingham Forest's reserve team to the Central League title in the 2007–08 season. In December 2008, following the dismissal of first-team manager Colin Calderwood, Pemberton was appointed as caretaker manager for the match against Norwich City, guiding Forest to a 3–2 victory. Billy Davies was appointed to the post, but did not take over with immediate effect. Pemberton took charge of the Forest side which caused an upset in the Third Round of the FA Cup by winning 3–0 at the City of Manchester Stadium against Premier League opponents Manchester City. At the end of the 2008–09 season Davies reorganised his coaching staff, and Pemberton's contract was terminated by mutual consent after more than a decade as part of Forest's backroom team.

The following season saw him join Crystal Palace's coaching staff for a short spell. The Eagles were in administration, and Pemberton was brought in, along with manager Paul Hart and assistant Dougie Freedman (both of whom had worked with Pemberton as a manager and a player respectively at Forest), for two months to keep the Eagles in the Championship. This was achieved on the final day of the season, after which his contract expired.

After leaving Palace he was appointed as the manager of Sheffield United's Academy in May 2010 and guided his young team to the Youth FA Cup Final the following season, losing out to Manchester United over two legs. He left Sheffield United in September 2012. On 25 October 2012 he re-joined the coaching staff of Nottingham Forest as a 'Professional Development Coach'.

On 28 November 2013, Pemberton was appointed caretaker manager at Bristol City for the club's next game away to Preston North End the following Saturday, this was after the sacking of manager Sean O'Driscoll. He joined Chesterfield as their new academy manager in September 2018, before becoming caretaker manager of their first-team in the following December after Martin Allen was sacked.

In May 2019 he was announced as new manager of Kidderminster Harriers. He resigned on 27 November 2019 after five wins in 16 games.

In January 2020 he was made caretaker manager of Chesterfield following the sacking of John Sheridan. He was made permanent manager in February.

On 18 November 2020, Pemberton left Chesterfield by mutual consent after a poor run of form with the Spireites.

== Honours ==
Crystal Palace

- Football League Second Division play-offs: 1989
- FA Cup runner-up: 1989–90

Leeds United

- Football League Cup runner-up: 1995–96
