= Mike Lake (footballer) =

English footballer (born 1966)

Personal information
- Full name: Michael Charles Lake
- Date of birth: 16 November 1966 (age 59)
- Place of birth: Manchester, England
- Height: 1.83 m (6 ft 0 in)
- Position: Midfielder

Senior career*
Years	Team	Apps	(Gls)
1986–1987	Macclesfield Town		
1987–1992	Sheffield United	35	(4)
1992–1995	Wrexham	58	(6)
- * Club domestic league appearances and goals

Michael Charles Lake (born 16 November 1966) is an English former professional footballer who played as a midfielder.

== Career ==
Lake was born in Manchester. After being a peripheral figure in his first few seasons at Sheffield United and hindered by injuries, Lake then featured more regularly in the early 1990s once United were back in the old First Division. Lake's time at United is best remembered during the 1991–92 season where he had a consistent spell in the team and scored four times in four games, all of which were opportunist and often spectacular. Lake, with his distinctive long hair and sudden goal scoring streak, became a cult-hero at United and as a result of the spectacular goals the Blades fans nicknamed Lake, Mike "Zico" Lake, after the famous Brazilian footballer Arthur Antunes Coimbra, better known as Zico. In particular, Lake is remembered at United for his long range goal against Southampton in a 4–2 victory at The Dell. The goal was also nominated for goal of the month and was described as a "Brazilian bender" by United's manager Dave Bassett. Lake also scored a second in the same match, again from long range, this time aided by a deflection.

In search of regular first team football, Lake joined Wrexham in November of the 1992–93 season, first in a three-month loan which was then made permanent in a £40,000 deal later on in the season, much to the delight of the Wrexham fans, of which numerous had written to Lake personally asking him to join permanently, upon the end of his loan spell. Lake again became a favourite and won promotion with Wrexham during the same season. Injuries began to then take their toll and Lake was released by Wrexham at the end of the 1994–95 season. Lake won the Welsh Cup in his final season at the Racecourse Stadium. Wrexham was Lake's last club as injuries prevented him from playing elsewhere and he had to retire.

== Personal life ==
He is the elder brother of former Manchester City favourite Paul Lake.
