= John Gannon (footballer) =

English footballer

Personal information
- Full name: John Spencer Gannon
- Date of birth: 18 December 1966 (age 59)
- Place of birth: Wimbledon, England
- Height: 5 ft 8 in (1.73 m)
- Position: Midfielder

Senior career*
Years	Team	Apps	(Gls)
1984–1989	Wimbledon	16	(2)
1986	→ Crewe Alexandra (loan)	15	(0)
1989	→ Sheffield United (loan)	16	(1)
1989–1996	Sheffield United	158	(5)
1993	→ Middlesbrough (loan)	7	(0)
1996–1997	Oldham Athletic	6	(0)
- * Club domestic league appearances and goals

John Spencer Gannon (born 18 December 1966) is an English former professional footballer, featuring mainly for Sheffield United.

== Career ==
In recent years he has held coaching roles at clubs including Mansfield Town, Chester City, Notts County and Leeds United. He is working as a scout with Manchester City.

As a player, he started at Wimbledon whilst also featuring for the Republic of Ireland at youth level. Gannon was part of the Wimbledon squad that went all the way to the 1988 FA Cup Final where they achieved a shock 1–0 win over Liverpool, although he didn't feature on the day.

With first team matches limited at the Dons, Gannon left for Sheffield United thereby joining his former Wimbledon boss Dave Bassett, initially on loan during the 1988/1989 season, before signing permanently on a free transfer for the start of the 1989/90 season. Gannon was particularly strong with his left foot and also took corners and free kicks, setting up goals regularly during Gannons time at United. Gannon was part of the Sheffield United team that achieved two successive promotions and was a regular player in the old First Division for the Blades.
