= Glyn Hodges =

Welsh footballer and manager

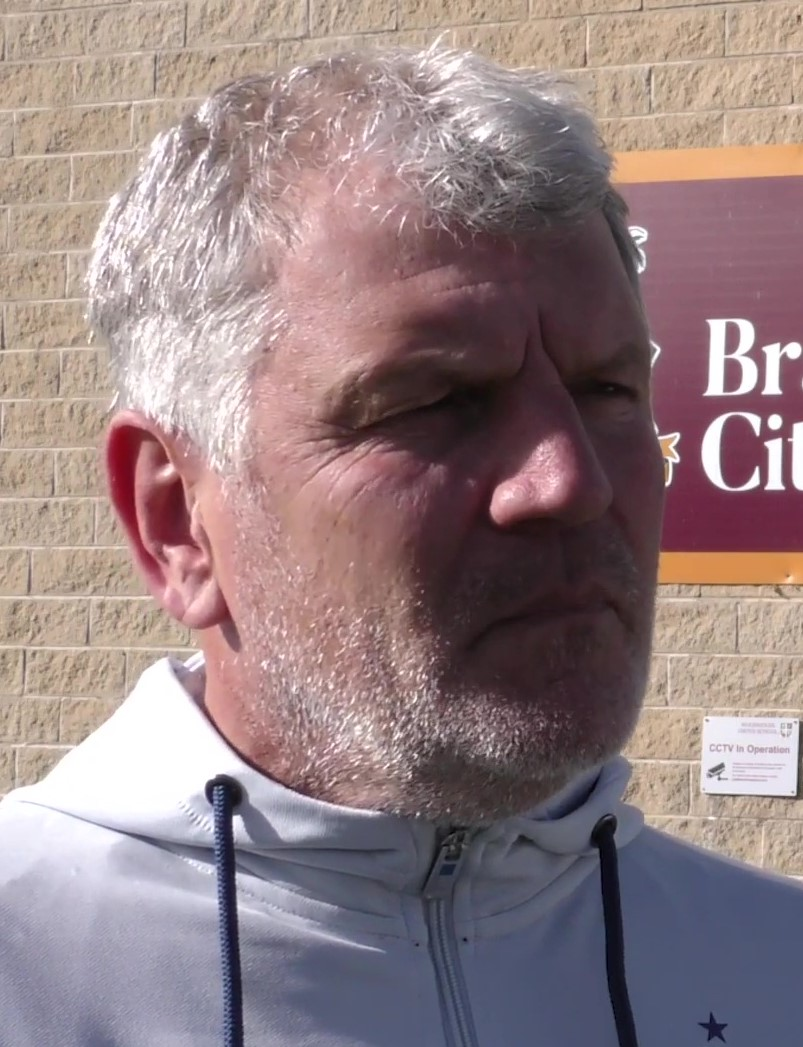

Personal information
- Full name: Glyn Peter Hodges
- Date of birth: 30 April 1963 (age 63)
- Place of birth: Streatham, England
- Height: 6 ft 1 in (1.85 m)
- Position: Winger

Youth career
- 1978–1980: Wimbledon

Senior career*
Years	Team	Apps	(Gls)
1980–1987	Wimbledon	232	(49)
1981	→ Koparit (loan)	12	(6)
1987	Newcastle United	7	(0)
1987–1990	Watford	86	(15)
1990–1991	Crystal Palace	7	(0)
1991–1996	Sheffield United	147	(19)
1996	Derby County	9	(0)
1996–1997	Sing Tao	10	(4)
1997–1998	Hull City	19	(4)
1998–1999	Nottingham Forest	5	(0)
1999	Scarborough	1	(0)
Total		535	(97)

International career
1984–1996	Wales	18	(2)

Managerial career
- 2001: Barnsley (Caretaker)
- 2002–2003: Barnsley (Caretaker)
- 2013–2018: Stoke City U23s
- 2019–2021: AFC Wimbledon
- 2022–2023: Bradford City (Assistant Manager)
- 2025: Carlisle United (Assistant Manager)
- * Club domestic league appearances and goals

Glyn Peter Hodges (born 30 April 1963) is a Welsh football coach and former professional player.

During his playing career he played for Wimbledon, Newcastle United, Watford, Crystal Palace, Sheffield United, Derby County, Hull City, Nottingham Forest and Scarborough. He also played 18 times for the Wales national side, scoring twice.

== Playing career ==
Hodges started his playing career with Wimbledon and made more than 200 appearances for the Crazy Gang during seven years at the club. He had a brief spell with Newcastle United before returning south to join Watford in 1987 to re-team with ex-Wimbledon manager Dave Bassett. In the summer of 1981 Hodges played in Finland for Koparit.

He made over 100 appearances at Vicarage Road, enjoying four years at the club, and being voted Player of the Season in 1989, before joining Crystal Palace in the summer of 1990. His spell with the Eagles was short lived and the winger moved on loan to Sheffield United and thereby again linked up with former boss Dave Bassett. Hodges' form was impressive and he scored a number of key goals, before the move was made permanent for £410,000 via the help of a Sheffield United Grand National Sweepstake ticket, paid for by the Sheffield United fans.

Hodges' five years at Bramall Lane were successful and he became a fans favourite during his stay. Hodges notably scored the winner against Manchester United in a 5th round cup tie win at Bramall Lane.

Hodges made over 150 appearances for The Blades, before joining Derby County for a brief spell in 1996. After a year in Hong Kong with Sing Tao, Hodges returned to England for a brief spell at Hull City. However, a big club clause in his contract allowed a move to Nottingham Forest to link once again with Bassett as a potential coach. However, an injury crisis at the start of the 1998–99 season meant Hodges was drafted in as a player. Brief spells at Total Network Solutions and Scarborough followed before Hodges retired in 2000.

== Coaching career ==
The former Dons man arrived at Barnsley in August 2000 to link up with his old friend Bassett again. His work with the reserves had seen the side regularly challenge for honours both in the league and cup.

He was appointed caretaker manager for the first time back in October 2001 following the dismissal of Nigel Spackman and was in charge for just four games before Steve Parkin left Rochdale to take over The Tykes.

Parkin's tenure lasted just nine months as he was dismissed, with the club going into administration following their relegation to Division Two. Hodges again became caretaker manager and remained in charge for the remainder of the season up until the summer of 2003. Then, with the club in desperate trouble financially, Hodges was replaced by Gudjon Thordarson, who was part of the consortium that took control of the club in June 2003.

In early 2004, Glyn Hodges joined Mark Hughes in the Wales International set-up, becoming Wales Under 21 manager. Despite making "positive strides", Glyn was removed from his role by John Toshack's shake up of the Football Association Wales staff in December 2004

Glyn then rejoined his former boss, Mark Hughes, as Blackburn Reserve team manager. In July 2008 Glyn announced he was to leave Blackburn Rovers whereupon, after a month of delays, he followed Hughes to Manchester City, being appointed again in the role of Reserve Team Manager. However, he became unemployed on 19 December 2009 when Mark Hughes and his complete backroom staff were relieved of their duties at the club.

Glyn subsequently spent a brief spell at Leeds United as a coach before re-joining Mark Hughes as First team coach at Fulham in October 2010. He then worked at Queens Park Rangers and on 2 July 2013 he joined Stoke City as under-21 coach. He left Stoke in January 2018.

On 4 December 2018, he joined Wally Downes as AFC Wimbledon's assistant manager. On 25 September 2019, he took over the management of the first team on a temporary basis following the suspension of Downes who had been charged by the FA for betting misconduct. This appointment became permanent on 23 October 2019. Hodges left the role on 30 January 2021 following a home loss to their bitter rivals, MK Dons.

On 29 January 2022, he joined the coaching staff at League One side Doncaster Rovers, alongside manager Gary McSheffrey and assistant Frank Sinclair. He became assistant manager at Bradford City in February 2022.

Having followed Hughes once again to Carlisle United, he departed the club in June 2025 due to family commitments.

== Career statistics ==
- Sourced from Glyn Hodges at the English National Football Archive (subscription required)

Club	Season	League			FA Cup		League Cup		Other^{[A]}		Total	
Club	Season	Division	Apps	Goals	Apps	Goals	Apps	Goals	Apps	Goals	Apps	Goals
Wimbledon	1980–81	Fourth Division	30	5	4	0	0	0	0	0	34	5
Wimbledon	1981–82	Third Division	34	2	1	0	2	0	6	1	43	3
Wimbledon	1982–83	Fourth Division	37	9	0	0	1	0	3	0	41	9
Wimbledon	1983–84	Third Division	42	15	2	0	6	3	1	0	51	18
Wimbledon	1984–85	Second Division	22	3	3	0	2	0	0	0	27	3
Wimbledon	1985–86	Second Division	30	6	1	0	3	0	0	0	34	6
Wimbledon	1986–87	First Division	37	9	4	2	2	0	0	0	43	11
Wimbledon	Total		232	49	15	2	16	3	10	1	273	55
Koparit (loan)	1981	Mestaruussarja	12	6	0	0	0	0	0	0	12	6
Newcastle United	1987–88	First Division	7	0	0	0	0	0	0	0	7	0
Watford	1987–88	First Division	24	3	5	0	4	1	0	0	33	4
Watford	1988–89	Second Division	27	5	0	0	0	0	3	0	30	5
Watford	1989–90	Second Division	35	7	3	1	1	0	0	0	39	8
Watford	Total		86	15	8	1	5	1	3	0	102	17
Crystal Palace	1990–91	First Division	7	0	0	0	4	1	0	0	11	1
Sheffield United	1990–91	First Division	12	4	0	0	0	0	0	0	12	4
Sheffield United	1991–92	First Division	26	2	4	1	0	0	0	0	30	3
Sheffield United	1992–93	Premier League	31	4	7	2	3	0	0	0	41	6
Sheffield United	1993–94	Premier League	31	2	1	0	2	0	0	0	34	2
Sheffield United	1994–95	First Division	25	4	1	0	1	0	0	0	27	4
Sheffield United	1995–96	First Division	22	3	3	0	2	0	0	0	27	3
Sheffield United	Total		147	19	16	3	8	0	0	0	171	22
Derby County	1995–96	First Division	9	0	0	0	0	0	0	0	9	0
Sing Tao	1996–97	Hong Kong First Division	10	4	0	0	0	0	0	0	10	4
Hull City	1997–98	Third Division	18	4	1	0	1	0	2	0	22	4
Nottingham Forest	1998–99	Premier League	5	0	0	0	0	0	0	0	5	0
Scarborough	1998–99	Third Division	1	0	0	0	0	0	0	0	1	0
Career Total			534	97	40	6	34	5	15	1	623	109

A. The "Other" column constitutes appearances and goals in the Football League Group Cup, Football League Trophy and Full Members Cup.

=== Managerial statistics ===
As of match played 30 January 2021

Managerial record by team and tenure
Team	From	To	Record				
Team	From	To	P	W	D	L	Win %
Barnsley	25 October 2001	9 November 2001	4	1	1	2	25.0
Barnsley	15 October 2002	30 June 2003	35	9	10	16	25.7
AFC Wimbledon	20 October 2019	30 January 2021	62	18	18	26	29.0
Total			101	28	29	44	27.7

== Honours ==
Wimbledon

- Football League Fourth Division: 1982–83
- Football League Group Cup runner-up: 1981–82
