= Alan Cork =

Footballer and manager (born 1959)

Personal information
- Full name: Alan Graham Cork
- Date of birth: 4 March 1959 (age 67)
- Place of birth: Derby, England
- Height: 6 ft 0 in (1.83 m)
- Position: Forward

Senior career*
| Years | Team | Apps | (Gls) |
| 1977–1978 | Lincoln City | 5 | (0) |
| 1978–1992 | Wimbledon | 430 | (145) |
| 1992–1994 | Sheffield United | 54 | (7) |
| 1994–1995 | Fulham | 15 | (3) |
| Total | | 504 | (155) |

Managerial career
- 1997–1998: Swansea City
- 1998–2000: Chesham United
- 2000–2002: Cardiff City
- 2008–2010: Bolton Wanderers Reserves
- * Club domestic league appearances and goals

Alan Graham Cork (born 4 March 1959) is an English former professional footballer. He played as a striker for several clubs, most notably Wimbledon (where he spent 14 years, played in all four divisions of the Football League and gained an FA Cup-winner's medal in 1988) and has held a number of managerial and coaching posts since his retirement from playing.

He holds the record for first-team appearances and first-team goals at Wimbledon and is also the only player to have scored in all four divisions of the pre-1992 Football League and also the Premier League.

== Playing career ==
=== Early career ===
Cork started his career at Derby County. However, despite a loan spell at Lincoln City, Cork failed to break into the Derby first team and subsequently joined Wimbledon, who had been recently elected to the Football League and were playing in Division Four at the time, on a free transfer in 1978.

=== Wimbledon ===
Cork's very substantial contribution to the team over more than 14 years helped Wimbledon climb the football league pyramid and eventually gained them entry into the First Division, playing in every division of the Football League in the process. Initially, the club's first choice starting striker, Cork also played sixty minutes of Wimbledon's famous FA Cup triumph over Liverpool on 14 May 1988. Four days later, his testimonial match was held at Plough Lane against an All Stars XI from various club sides, to mark 10 years of Cork's service to Wimbledon.

He is fondly remembered by fans of the club from their Plough Lane days, who used to salute him on the pitch with a chant of 'Alan Cork, Alan Cork, Alan Alan Cork. He's got no hair but we don't care, Alan Alan Cork', in reference to Cork's increasing baldness. Typically, on hearing the chant, Cork would turn to the crowd and tap his head. During the rise of the club's notorious "Crazy Gang" image, he was always portrayed as the "sensible one" in the team.

During his time at Wimbledon, he set the club record for both the most first team appearances and also the most first-team goals scored.

He eventually left Wimbledon in early 1992 to join Sheffield United on a free transfer. In 14 years at Wimbledon, he scored 145 league goals in 440 appearances.

=== Sheffield Utd. and retirement ===
He spent two and a half seasons with Sheffield United, including two full seasons in the newly rebranded FA Premier League. He famously grew a thick beard, and refused to shave until Sheffield United's FA Cup run of 1992–93 had ended. The cup run lasted four months, as the Blades made it all the way to the semi-finals, going out to local rivals Sheffield Wednesday at Wembley. He scored the equalising goal in a 2–1 defeat.

Halfway through the 1994–95 season, he moved to Fulham before retiring after the season aged 36. During his whole career no (significant) transfer fee was paid for him.

== Managerial and coaching career ==
=== Fulham ===
Following his retirement he was appointed to the coaching staff at Fulham where he held the positions of youth coach and first team coach, the latter after Micky Adams was appointed manager in 1996. In his role of first-team coach, he helped Fulham win promotion from Division Three in 1997.

=== Swansea City ===
In October 1997, he moved on to Swansea City as assistant manager to Micky Adams. Adams stepped down within two weeks of taking over, and Cork took over for the rest of the season without achieving much success. However a number of key players brought to the club by Cork during that period would form the spine of the Swansea side that won the Division Three title under John Hollins in 2000.

=== Chesham United ===
Cork was appointed player-manager of non-league Chesham United in 1998 where he remained for nearly two years before accepting the role of assistant manager at Cardiff City in the summer of 2000.

=== Cardiff City ===
Cork returned to league management in October 2000 with Cardiff City, and guided them to promotion as Division Three runners-up seven months later. Despite this, Cork was never very popular with the supporters, and he was fired the following season in February 2002, after a run of results that left Cardiff somewhat adrift of the Division Two automatic promotion places. This was despite him leading Cardiff to a famous FA Cup third round win over then Premiership leaders Leeds United some six weeks earlier.

=== Leicester City ===
In the summer of 2002, Cork joined Leicester City as assistant manager to Micky Adams. In his first full season he helped them achieve promotion to the Premiership, despite the club spending much of the season in receivership with huge debts. Leicester were saved by a takeover deal but their top-flight comeback lasted just one season. He followed Adams out of the Walkers Stadium exit door in October 2004.

=== Bolton Wanderers ===
In July 2007 he was employed as a scout by Premier League side Bolton Wanderers who were looking for a number of former professionals to join a scouting team led by former Everton manager Colin Harvey. In October 2007 he was appointed to the Bolton backroom team full-time when taking up the role of Assistant Head Coach but left in January 2010 when manager Gary Megson was replaced by Owen Coyle.

=== Sheffield United ===
On 30 December 2010, he was appointed the assistant manager of Sheffield United, working alongside new manager Micky Adams. This was the fourth club at which he worked as Adams' assistant. On 9 May 2011, following Adams' dismissal following the club's relegation to League One, Cork was also sacked.

=== England ===
Cork is a scout for the England national football team.

== Wimbledon Old Players Association ==
Cork is a member of the Wimbledon Old Players Association. Cork scored on his Wimbledon Masters XI debut v a Chelsea Legends XI in a charity fixture at Kingsmeadow.

== Personal life ==
Cork is the father of Burnley player Jack Cork.

== Statistics ==
=== Player ===
| Club performance | | | League | | Cup | | League Cup | | Total | |
| Season | Club | League | Apps | Goals | Apps | Goals | Apps | Goals | Apps | Goals |
| England | | | League | | FA Cup | | League Cup | | Total | |
|---|---|---|---|---|---|---|---|---|---|---|
| 1977–78 | Derby County | Division 1 | 0 | 0 | | | | | | |
| 1977–78 | Lincoln City | Division 3 | 5 | 0 | | | | | | |
| 1977–78 | Wimbledon | Division 4 | 17 | 4 | | | | | | |
| 1978–79 | Wimbledon | Division 4 | 45 | 22 | | | | | | |
| 1979–80 | Wimbledon | Division 3 | 42 | 12 | | | | | | |
| 1980–81 | Wimbledon | Division 4 | 41 | 23 | | | | | | |
| 1981–82 | Wimbledon | Division 3 | 6 | 0 | | | | | | |
| 1982–83 | Wimbledon | Division 4 | 7 | 5 | | | | | | |
| 1983–84 | Wimbledon | Division 3 | 42 | 29 | | | | | | |
| 1984–85 | Wimbledon | Division 2 | 28 | 11 | | | | | | |
| 1985–86 | Wimbledon | Division 2 | 38 | 11 | | | | | | |
| 1986–87 | Wimbledon | Division 1 | 30 | 5 | | | | | | |
| 1987–88 | Wimbledon | Division 1 | 34 | 9 | | | | | | |
| 1988–89 | Wimbledon | Division 1 | 25 | 2 | | | | | | |
| 1989–90 | Wimbledon | Division 1 | 31 | 5 | | | | | | |
| 1990–91 | Wimbledon | Division 1 | 25 | 5 | | | | | | |
| 1991–92 | Wimbledon | Division 1 | 19 | 2 | | | | | | |
| 1991–92 | Sheffield United | Division 1 | 8 | 2 | | | | | | |
| 1992–93 | Sheffield United | Premier League | 27 | 2 | | | | | | |
| 1993–94 | Sheffield United | Premier League | 19 | 3 | | | | | | |
| 1993–94 | Fulham | Division 2 | 15 | 3 | | | | | | |
| Total | England | | 504 | 155 | ? | ? | ? | ? | ? | ? |

- Blank means unknown (FA- and League Cup)

=== Manager ===
| Team | Country | From | To | Record | | | | |
| Team | Country | From | To | G | W | D | L | Win % |
|---|---|---|---|---|---|---|---|---|
| Swansea City | Wales | 22 October 1997 | 30 June 1998 | 35 | 10 | 10 | 15 | 28.57 |
| Chesham United | England | 1998 | 2000 | ? | ? | ? | ? | |
| Cardiff City | Wales | 16 October 2000 | 17 February 2002 | 68 | 33 | 18 | 17 | 48.53 |
| Total | | | | 103 | 43 | 28 | 32 | 41.75 |

== Honours ==
Wimbledon

- FA Cup: 1987–88
