= Jamie Hoyland =

English footballer

Personal information
- Full name: Jamie William Hoyland
- Date of birth: 23 January 1966 (age 60)
- Place of birth: Sheffield, England
- Height: 6 ft 0 in (1.83 m)
- Position: Midfielder

Team information
- Current team: Sheffield United (chief scout)

Senior career*
Years	Team	Apps	(Gls)
1983–1986	Manchester City	2	(0)
1986–1990	Bury	172	(35)
1990–1994	Sheffield United	89	(6)
1993–1994	→ Bristol City (loan)	6	(0)
1994–1998	Burnley	87	(4)
1997–1998	→ Carlisle United (loan)	5	(0)
1998–1999	Scarborough	44	(3)
Total		405	(48)

International career
1983	England Youth	3	(0)

Managerial career
- ????: Preston North End Youth
- 2012–2013: Sheffield United Academy
- * Club domestic league appearances and goals

Jamie William Hoyland (born 23 January 1966) is an English former footballer who made more than 400 appearances in the Football League and Premier League playing in midfield in the 1980s and 1990s. He then turned to coaching. He is chief scout at Sheffield United.

His father Tommy Hoyland had also played for Sheffield United from 1949 to 1961.

== Playing career ==
Hoyland was born in Sheffield. He began his playing career at Manchester City as a midfielder and later left to Bury FC. After making over a hundred appearance for the club, he left for Sheffield United. At his last year at Sheffield, he was sent on loan to Bristol City.

== Coaching career ==
He was appointed assistant manager at Rochdale in 2002. and has held youth coaching positions at Bolton Wanderers and Preston North End. In September 2012, Hoyland was appointed manager of Sheffield United F.C. Academy. However, on 19 March 2013 he resigned as academy manager.

In 2016, Hoyland joined Everton as part of the under-23 recruitment team. He was promoted to European Senior Scout in 2020 before his departure at the end of the 2022–23.

In May 2024, he was appointed chief scout at Sheffield United.
