= Simon Tracey =

English football goalkeeper and scout (born 1967)

Personal information
- Full name: Simon Peter Tracey
- Date of birth: 9 December 1967 (age 58)
- Place of birth: Woolwich, England
- Height: 6 ft 0 in (1.83 m)
- Position: Goalkeeper

Senior career*
Years	Team	Apps	(Gls)
1985–1988	Wimbledon	1	(0)
1988–2003	Sheffield United	332	(0)
1994	→ Manchester City (loan)	3	(0)
1994	→ Norwich City (loan)	1	(0)
1995	→ Nottingham Forest (loan)	0	(0)
1995	→ Wimbledon (loan)	1	(0)
Total		338	(0)
- * Club domestic league appearances and goals

Simon Peter Tracey (born 9 December 1967) is an English former professional footballer who made more than 300 appearances in the Football League playing as a goalkeeper for Wimbledon, Sheffield United, Manchester City, Norwich City, Nottingham Forest and Wimbledon. He is currently chief scout at Northampton Town.

== Playing career ==
Tracey played most of his professional career at Sheffield United. He started out as a goalkeeper at Wimbledon in 1985. He made his debut in a 2–1 loss to Liverpool in the Charity Shield in 1988 after Dave Beasant, the hero of the FA Cup Final win that gave Wimbledon their place in the match, had been sold to Newcastle United. He kept his place for the first League game of the season but did not perform well in a 5–1 defeat and was dropped and replaced temporarily with Ron Green and then, permanently, Hans Segers.

He was sold on to Sheffield United in 1988 for £7,500 and was part of the team that was promoted from the old Third Division in the 1988-89 season finishing in second place. He was an ever-present during the following season when United were again promoted, this time to the old First Division and also won the club's player of the season award for the same season. Tracey remained first-choice in the top flight and was again player of the season, this time for the 1991-92 season.

Tracey then suffered regular injuries and his games were limited by the arrival of Alan Kelly in the summer of 1992 for the first season of the new FA Premier League. He got a start against Tottenham Hotspur on 2nd September 1992, but was sent off for two bookable offences, first handling the ball outside the penalty area, and then for grabbing Andy Gray to prevent him taking a quick throw in, again while out of the penalty area. After this he had loan spells at several clubs, including Manchester City, Norwich City, Nottingham Forest and his old team Wimbledon. Whilst on loan at Manchester City in November 1994, Tracey appeared in a 5–0 loss to rivals Manchester Utd, the worst losing margin for City in a Manchester Derby.

A loan spell at Norwich City during the 1994-95 season was a nightmare for Tracey. He made three appearances - in the first he ran out of his area allowing Coventry to score an easy goal, in the second he was stretchered off with an injury and in the third he let in five goals in an FA Cup tie at Everton. In 2000 when he played at Norwich for Sheffield United he made a similar charge from his area that allowed Norwich striker Craig Bellamy to score.

In 1995, he had a short spell on loan at Nottingham Forest but did not play for the first team, then played one game back at Wimbledon in a 4–1 defeat to Forest.

Tracey again featured regularly for Sheffield United in the late 1990s and early 2000s, and in total went on to make 382 appearances for United until 2003. His playing days came to an end when he suffered an injury during pre-season to the 2002–2003 season and once recovered, summer signing Paddy Kenny had cemented his place in the first team. This led to Tracey retiring from football. Tracey received a testimonial in 2003 for his long-standing career at Sheffield United.

== Coaching career ==
Tracey began his goalkeeper coaching career in 2004 at Rotherham United F.C., replacing previous coach Graham Brown. His position lasted until October 2009, when he joined Mark Robins, John Breckin and Nick Daws at Barnsley.

He joined Northampton Town as chief scout in October 2019.
