= 2001–02 Sheffield United F.C. season =

Sheffield United
2001–02 season
- Chairman: Derek Dooley
- Manager: Neil Warnock
- Stadium: Bramall Lane
- First Division: 13th
- FA Cup: Fourth round
- League Cup: Second round
- Top goalscorer: League: Asaba (7); All: Asaba (7)
- Highest home attendance: 29,364 vs Sheffield Wednesday (29 Jan 2002, First Division)
- Lowest home attendance: 14,180 vs Crystal Palace (25 Sep 2001, First Division)
- Average home league attendance: 18,020
Home colours

During the 2001–02 English football season, Sheffield United competed in the Football League First Division.

== Season summary ==
During the 2001–02 campaign, the Blades hoped to build on last season's top-half finish, but inconsistent results and too many draws cost them the opportunity to challenge for promotion via the play-offs. They finished in 13th place – a disappointing mid-table finish in Neil Warnock's second full season in charge.

== Final league table ==
Pos	Team	Pld	W	D	L	GF	GA	GD	Pts
11	Coventry City	46	20	6	20	59	53	+6	66
12	Gillingham	46	18	10	18	64	67	−3	64
13	Sheffield United	46	15	15	16	53	54	−1	60
14	Watford	46	16	11	19	62	56	+6	59
15	Bradford City	46	15	10	21	69	76	−7	55

Rules for classification: 1) Points; 2) Goal difference; 3) Goals scored

Results summary

Overall								Home						Away					
Pld	W	D	L	GF	GA	GD	Pts	W	D	L	GF	GA	GD	W	D	L	GF	GA	GD
46	15	15	16	53	54	−1	60	8	8	7	34	30	+4	7	7	9	19	24	−5

Source: 2001-02 Football League First Division table

Results by round

Round	1	2	3	4	5	6	7	8	9	10	11	12	13	14	15	16	17	18	19	20	21	22	23	24	25	26	27	28	29	30	31	32	33	34	35	36	37	38	39	40	41	42	43	44	45	46
Ground	A	H	A	H	H	H	A	A	H	H	A	H	A	A	A	H	H	A	A	H	A	H	A	H	H	A	A	H	A	H	H	A	H	A	A	H	A	A	H	H	H	A	H	A	H	A
Result	D	D	D	D	D	L	W	L	L	W	D	W	D	L	L	W	L	L	D	W	W	D	W	D	D	W	L	L	W	D	D	L	W	L	W	W	L	D	L	W	W	D	L	W	L	L
Position	12	15	13	14	15	20	15	18	20	17	17	14	15	17	17	15	16	18	16	16	15	16	15	14	16	14	16	16	14	15	14	16	14	15	13	11	15	15	15	14	12	13	13	13	13	13

Source: 11v11.com: 2001-02 Sheffield United results
A = Away; H = Home; W = Win; D = Draw; L = Loss

== Results ==
Sheffield United's score comes first

=== Legend ===
Win	Draw	Loss

=== Football League First Division ===
Date	Opponent	Venue	Result	Attendance	Scorers
11 August 2001	Nottingham Forest	A	1–1	25,513	Devlin
18 August 2001	Gillingham	H	0–0	16,998	
23 August 2001	Rotherham United	A	1–1	7,515	D'Jaffo (pen)
27 August 2001	Wolverhampton Wanderers	H	2–2	16,497	D'Jaffo (pen), Asaba
8 September 2001	Bradford City	H	2–2	17,394	Curle, Asaba
15 September 2001	Coventry City	H	0–1	16,168	
18 September 2001	Stockport County	A	2–1	5,137	Nicholson (pen), Ndlovu
22 September 2001	Millwall	A	0–2	12,276	
25 September 2001	Crystal Palace	H	1–3	14,180	Nicholson
29 September 2001	Norwich City	H	2–1	15,523	Asaba, Suffo
7 October 2001	Sheffield Wednesday	A	0–0	29,281	
13 October 2001	Grimsby Town	H	3–1	15,442	Suffo (2), Brown
16 October 2001	Manchester City	A	0–0	32,454	
20 October 2001	Portsmouth	A	0–1	15,538	
23 October 2001	Preston North End	A	0–3	14,027	
27 October 2001	Crewe Alexandra	H	1–0	15,185	Tonge
30 October 2001	Watford	H	0–2	14,338	
4 November 2001	Burnley	A	0–2	13,166	
9 November 2001	Wimbledon	A	1–1	4,937	Santos
17 November 2001	Birmingham City	H	4–0	15,686	Montgomery, Brown, Peschisolido (2)
24 November 2001	Walsall	A	2–1	6,415	Brown, Nicholson (pen)
1 December 2001	Preston North End	H	2–2	16,270	Peschisolido, Santos
8 December 2001	West Bromwich Albion	A	1–0	19,462	Asaba
14 December 2001	Barnsley	H	1–1	17,858	Peschisolido
22 December 2001	Rotherham United	H	2–2	22,749	Suffo, Devlin
26 December 2001	Bradford City	A	2–1	18,869	Asaba (2)
29 December 2001	Wolverhampton Wanderers	A	0–1	24,138	
1 January 2002	Manchester City	H	1–3	26,291	Brown
12 January 2002	Gillingham	A	1–0	8,814	Tonge
19 January 2002	Nottingham Forest	H	0–0	18,352	
29 January 2002	Sheffield Wednesday	H	0–0	29,364	
3 February 2002	Norwich City	A	1–2	17,348	Brown
9 February 2002	Portsmouth	H	4–3	17,553	Montgomery, Furlong (2, 1 pen), Asaba
16 February 2002	Grimsby Town	A	0–1	7,141	
23 February 2002	Crystal Palace	A	1–0	18,009	Brown
2 March 2002	Stockport County	H	3–0	15,642	Woodthorpe (own goal), Peschisolido, Ndlovu
6 March 2002	Coventry City	A	0–1	12,963	
9 March 2002	Barnsley	A	1–1	15,430	D'Jaffo
16 March 2002	West Bromwich Albion	H	0–3	17,653	
19 March 2002	Millwall	H	3–2	16,037	Tonge, Ndlovu (2)
23 March 2002	Burnley	H	3–0	19,003	Jagielka (2), D'Jaffo
30 March 2002	Crewe Alexandra	A	2–2	7,855	D'Jaffo, Doane
1 April 2002	Wimbledon	H	0–1	19,712	
6 April 2002	Watford	A	3–0	13,377	Javary, Jagielka, Lovell
13 April 2002	Walsall	H	0–1	20,520	
21 April 2002	Birmingham City	A	0–2	29,178	

=== FA Cup ===
Round	Date	Opponent	Venue	Result	Attendance	Goalscorers
R3	5 January 2002	Nottingham Forest	H	1–0	14,696	Brown
R4	26 January 2002	Preston North End	A	1–2	13,068	Ndlovu

=== League Cup ===
Round	Date	Opponent	Venue	Result	Attendance	Goalscorers
R1	20 August 2001	Darlington	A	1–0	3,983	D'Jaffo
R2	11 September 2001	Grimsby Town	A	3–3 (lost 2–4 on pens)	5,236	Devlin, Ndlovu, Suffo

== Players ==
=== First-team squad ===
Squad at end of season

Note: Flags indicate national team as defined under FIFA eligibility rules; some limited exceptions apply. Players may hold more than one non-FIFA nationality.

No.	Pos.	Nation	Player
1	GK	ENG	Simon Tracey
2	DF	ENG	Rob Kozluk
3	DF	ENG	Shane Nicholson
4	DF	ENG	Lee Sandford
5	DF	AUS	Shaun Murphy
6	DF	ENG	Keith Curle (captain)
7	MF	ENG	Michael Brown
8	FW	CAN	Paul Peschisolido
9	FW	ENG	Carl Asaba
10	MF	ENG	Paul Devlin (Note: Devlin was born in Birmingham, England, but also qualified to represent Scotland internationally through his father and would make his international debut for Scotland in October 2002.)
11	MF	ENG	Bobby Ford
12	FW	BEN	Laurent D'Jaffo (Note: D'Jaffo was born in Bazas, France, but also qualified to represent Benin internationally and would make his international debut for Benin in 2002.)
13	GK	NED	Wilko de Vogt
14	MF	FRA	Georges Santos (Note: Santos was born in Marseille, France, but also qualified to represent Cape Verde internationally through his parents and would make his international debut for Cape Verde in September 2002.)
15	DF	ENG	Ben Doane
16	FW	ZIM	Peter Ndlovu
17	DF	ENG	Phil Jagielka
18	FW	ENG	Steve Lovell (on loan from Portsmouth)

No.	Pos.	Nation	Player
19	FW	CMR	Patrick Suffo
20	MF	FRA	Jean-Philippe Javary
21	MF	ENG	Adam Burley
22	MF	ENG	Nick Montgomery (Note: Montgomery was born in Leeds, England, but also qualified to represent Scotland internationally and represented them at U-21 level.)
23	DF	ENG	Rob Ullathorne
24	DF	SUR	Gus Uhlenbeek
25	FW	ENG	Tyrone Thompson
26	MF	ENG	Michael Tonge
28	MF	SCO	Grant Smith
29	FW	ENG	Mark Ward
30	MF	ENG	Lee Thompson
31	MF	IRL	Colin Cryan
32	DF	WAL	Rob Page
33	DF	FRA	Benoît Croissant
34	FW	ENG	Ryan Mallon
35	GK	ENG	Kevin Blackwell
36	FW	ENG	Lewis Killeen

=== Left club during season ===
Note: Flags indicate national team as defined under FIFA eligibility rules; some limited exceptions apply. Players may hold more than one non-FIFA nationality.

No.	Pos.	Nation	Player
18	DF	BEL	Davy Gysbrechts (released)
18	FW	ENG	Paul Furlong (on loan from Birmingham City)
20	FW	NIR	Andy Smith (to Glentoran)

No.	Pos.	Nation	Player
23	DF	IRL	Terry Phelan (Note: Phelan was born in Manchester, England, but also qualified to represent the Republic of Ireland internationally and represented them at U-21, U-23, and B level before making his international debut for the Republic of Ireland in 1991.) (released)
27	MF	CMR	Buba Yohanna (released)
35	FW	ENG	Adrian Littlejohn (released])
