= 2000–01 Sheffield United F.C. season =

Sheffield United
2000–01 season
- Chairman: Derek Dooley
- Manager: Neil Warnock
- Stadium: Bramall Lane
- First Division: 10th
- FA Cup: Third round
- League Cup: Third round
- Top goalscorer: League: Kelly (6); All: Kelly (8); Bent (8); Devlin (8)
- Average home league attendance: 17,211

During the 2000–01 English football season, Sheffield United competed in the First Division.

== Season summary ==
Neil Warnock's first full season saw the Blades flirting with the play-off places following pockets of good runs. A victory over rivals Sheffield Wednesday at Hillsborough was a highlight, but the Blades fell away from the play-off race to finish in 10th position.

== Final league table ==
| Pos | Team | Pld | W | D | L | GF | GA | GD | Pts |
|---|---|---|---|---|---|---|---|---|---|
| 8 | Wimbledon | 46 | 17 | 18 | 11 | 71 | 50 | +21 | 69 |
| 9 | Watford | 46 | 20 | 9 | 17 | 76 | 67 | +9 | 69 |
| 10 | Sheffield United | 46 | 19 | 11 | 16 | 52 | 49 | +3 | 68 |
| 11 | Nottingham Forest | 46 | 20 | 8 | 18 | 55 | 53 | +2 | 68 |
| 12 | Wolverhampton Wanderers | 46 | 14 | 13 | 19 | 45 | 48 | −3 | 55 |

Rules for classification: 1) Points; 2) Goal difference; 3) Goals scored

== Results ==
Sheffield United's score comes first

=== Legend ===
| Win | Draw | Loss |

=== Football League First Division ===
| Date | Opponent | Venue | Result | Attendance | Scorers |
|---|---|---|---|---|---|
| 12 August 2000 | Portsmouth | H | 2–0 | 15,816 | Devlin (pen), Primus (own goal) |
| 19 August 2000 | Preston North End | A | 0–3 | 13,948 | |
| 26 August 2000 | Tranmere Rovers | H | 2–0 | 12,074 | Bent (2) |
| 28 August 2000 | Watford | A | 1–4 | 12,675 | Quinn |
| 9 September 2000 | Birmingham City | A | 0–1 | 21,943 | |
| 12 September 2000 | Wolverhampton Wanderers | A | 0–0 | 14,853 | |
| 15 September 2000 | Blackburn Rovers | H | 2–0 | 10,816 | Kelly, Devlin |
| 23 September 2000 | Crystal Palace | A | 1–0 | 17,521 | Bent |
| 30 September 2000 | Queens Park Rangers | H | 1–1 | 13,803 | Murphy |
| 14 October 2000 | Crewe Alexandra | H | 1–0 | 12,921 | Santos |
| 17 October 2000 | Huddersfield Town | H | 3–0 | 14,062 | Kelly (2), Devlin |
| 21 October 2000 | Norwich City | A | 2–4 | 15,504 | Kelly, Brown |
| 24 October 2000 | Stockport County | H | 1–0 | 13,542 | Murphy |
| 28 October 2000 | Wimbledon | A | 0–0 | 7,327 | |
| 4 November 2000 | Gillingham | H | 1–2 | 14,028 | D'Jaffo |
| 11 November 2000 | Burnley | A | 0–2 | 16,635 | |
| 18 November 2000 | Grimsby Town | H | 3–2 | 12,861 | Santos, Bent (2) |
| 21 November 2000 | Fulham | H | 1–1 | 16,041 | D'Jaffo |
| 25 November 2000 | Bolton Wanderers | H | 1–0 | 14,962 | Sandford |
| 29 November 2000 | Nottingham Forest | A | 0–2 | 17,089 | |
| 2 December 2000 | Stockport County | A | 2–0 | 6,460 | Devlin, Quinn (pen) |
| 9 December 2000 | Barnsley | A | 0–0 | 16,780 | |
| 16 December 2000 | Sheffield Wednesday | H | 1–1 | 25,156 | Ford (pen) |
| 23 December 2000 | Portsmouth | A | 0–0 | 13,606 | |
| 26 December 2000 | West Bromwich Albion | H | 2–0 | 22,281 | Ford (pen), Kelly |
| 30 December 2000 | Preston North End | H | 3–2 | 22,316 | Ford (pen), Kelly, Thomas |
| 1 January 2001 | Tranmere Rovers | A | 0–1 | 8,474 | |
| 13 January 2001 | Watford | H | 0–1 | 17,551 | |
| 20 January 2001 | West Bromwich Albion | A | 1–2 | 16,778 | Peschisolido |
| 4 February 2001 | Fulham | A | 1–1 | 12,480 | D'Jaffo |
| 10 February 2001 | Birmingham City | H | 3–1 | 19,313 | Murphy, Devlin (pen), Peschisolido |
| 20 February 2001 | Wolverhampton Wanderers | H | 1–0 | 20,282 | D'Jaffo |
| 24 February 2001 | Crystal Palace | H | 1–0 | 18,924 | Suffo |
| 3 March 2001 | Queens Park Rangers | A | 3–1 | 11,024 | Murphy, Santos (2) |
| 6 March 2001 | Crewe Alexandra | A | 0–1 | 6,909 | |
| 10 March 2001 | Nottingham Forest | H | 1–3 | 25,673 | Murphy |
| 17 March 2001 | Huddersfield Town | A | 1–2 | 13,918 | Asaba |
| 1 April 2001 | Sheffield Wednesday | A | 2–1 | 38,433 | D'Jaffo, Asaba |
| 4 April 2001 | Blackburn Rovers | A | 1–1 | 26,276 | Ndlovu |
| 7 April 2001 | Barnsley | H | 1–2 | 22,811 | Asaba |
| 10 April 2001 | Norwich City | H | 1–1 | 16,072 | Roberts (own goal) |
| 14 April 2001 | Gillingham | A | 1–4 | 9,502 | Ndlovu |
| 17 April 2001 | Wimbledon | H | 0–1 | 14,527 | |
| 21 April 2001 | Grimsby Town | A | 1–0 | 6,983 | Ndlovu |
| 28 April 2001 | Burnley | H | 2–0 | 20,013 | Ndlovu, Asaba |
| 6 May 2001 | Bolton Wanderers | A | 1-1 | 14,836 | Asaba |

=== FA Cup ===
| Round | Date | Opponent | Venue | Result | Attendance | Goalscorers |
|---|---|---|---|---|---|---|
| R3 | 6 January 2001 | Southampton | A | 0–1 | 14,158 | |

=== League Cup ===
| Round | Date | Opponent | Venue | Result | Attendance | Goalscorers |
|---|---|---|---|---|---|---|
| R1 1st Leg | 22 August 2000 | Lincoln City | H | 6–1 | 4,152 | Bent (3), Devlin (pen), Kelly, Brown (own goal) |
| R1 2nd Leg | 5 September 2000 | Lincoln City | A | 0–1 (won 6–2 on agg) | 1,379 | |
| R2 1st Leg | 19 September 2000 | Colchester United | H | 3–0 | 3,531 | Devlin, Clark (own goal), Kelly |
| R2 2nd Leg | 27 September 2000 | Colchester United | A | 1–0 (won 4–0 on agg) | 1,981 | Devlin |
| R3 | 1 November 2000 | Sheffield Wednesday | A | 1–2 (a.e.t.) | 32,283 | Brown |

== Players ==
=== First-team squad ===
Squad at end of season

Note: Flags indicate national team as defined under FIFA eligibility rules; some limited exceptions apply. Players may hold more than one non-FIFA nationality.

| No. | Pos. | Nation | Player |
|---|---|---|---|
| 1 | GK | ENG | Simon Tracey |
| 2 | DF | ENG | Rob Kozluk |
| 4 | DF | ENG | Lee Sandford |
| 5 | DF | AUS | Shaun Murphy |
| 6 | DF | ENG | Keith Curle |
| 7 | MF | ENG | Michael Brown |
| 8 | FW | ZIM | Peter Ndlovu |
| 9 | FW | WAL | James Thomas (on loan from Blackburn Rovers) |
| 10 | MF | ENG | Paul Devlin (Note: Devlin was born in Birmingham, England, but also qualified to represent Scotland internationally through his father and would make his international debut for Scotland in October 2002.) |
| 11 | MF | ENG | Bobby Ford |
| 12 | FW | FRA | Laurent D'Jaffo (Note: D'Jaffo was born in Bazas, France, but also qualified to represent Benin internationally and would make his international debut for Benin in 2002.) |
| 13 | GK | AUS | Frank Talia |
| 14 | MF | FRA | Georges Santos (Note: Santos was born in Marseille, France, but also qualified to represent Cape Verde internationally through his parents and would make his international debut for Cape Verde in September 2002.) |
| 15 | DF | ENG | Andy Woodward |
| 17 | FW | ENG | Carl Asaba |
| 18 | DF | BEL | Davy Gysbrechts |
| 19 | FW | CMR | Patrick Suffo |
| 20 | MF | POR | Bruno Ribeiro |
| 21 | DF | ENG | Phil Jagielka |

| No. | Pos. | Nation | Player |
|---|---|---|---|
| 22 | FW | IRL | David Kelly (Note: Kelly was born in Birmingham, England, but also qualified to represent the Republic of Ireland internationally through his father and made his international debut for Republic of Ireland in November 1987.) |
| 23 | DF | SCO | Andy Morrison (on loan from Manchester City) |
| 24 | DF | SUR | Gus Uhlenbeek |
| 25 | DF | ENG | Ben Doane |
| 26 | FW | NIR | Andy Smith |
| 27 | MF | ENG | Adam Burley |
| 28 | DF | ENG | Rob Ullathorne |
| 30 | MF | ENG | Darren Bullock (on loan from Bury) |
| 31 | DF | FRA | Jean-Manuel Thetis |
| 32 | MF | ENG | Michael Tonge |
| 33 | MF | ENG | Ian Hamilton |
| 35 | MF | IRL | Colin Cryan |
| 36 | MF | ENG | Nick Montgomery (Note: Montgomery was born in Leeds, England, but also qualified to represent Scotland internationally and represented them at U-21 level.) |
| 37 | DF | IRL | John Hayden |
| 38 | FW | ENG | Mark Ward |
| 39 | MF | ENG | Michael Anderson |
| 41 | FW | ENG | Tyrone Thompson |
| 43 | MF | CMR | Kingsley Mbome |
| 45 | GK | ENG | Kevin Blackwell |

=== Left club during season ===
Note: Flags indicate national team as defined under FIFA eligibility rules; some limited exceptions apply. Players may hold more than one non-FIFA nationality.

| No. | Pos. | Nation | Player |
|---|---|---|---|
| 3 | DF | ENG | Wayne Quinn (to Newcastle United) |
| 8 | MF | ENG | Curtis Woodhouse (to Birmingham City) |
| 9 | FW | ENG | Marcus Bent (to Blackburn Rovers) |
| 13 | GK | ENG | Matt Duke (to Burton Albion) |
| 16 | FW | CAN | Paul Peschisolido (on loan from Fulham) |

| No. | Pos. | Nation | Player |
|---|---|---|---|
| 28 | FW | ENG | Jon Newby (on loan from Liverpool) |
| 34 | DF | FRA | Nicolas Weber (on loan from Le Havre) |
| 38 | MF | IRL | Richie Lopez (to Northampton Town) |
| 40 | DF | ENG | Steve Spencer (released) |
| 42 | DF | ENG | Paul Dempsey (to Northampton Town) |
