= 2002–03 Sheffield United F.C. season =

Sheffield United
2002–03 season
- Chairman: Derek Dooley
- Manager: Neil Warnock
- Stadium: Bramall Lane
- First Division: 3rd (qualified for play-offs)
- Play-offs: Runners-up
- FA Cup: Semi-finals
- League Cup: Semi-finals
- Top goalscorer: League: Brown (16); All: Brown (22)
- Average home league attendance: 18,113

During the 2002–03 English football season, Sheffield United competed in the Football League First Division.

== Season summary ==
The season turned out to be one of the most successful in Sheffield United's history. United reached the semi-finals of both the FA and League Cups before being eliminated by Arsenal and Liverpool respectively; both sides went on to win the respective cups. United also managed to qualify for the play-offs for promotion to the Premiership. United reached the play-off final after beating Nottingham Forest over two legs in the semi-final, but were beaten by Wolverhampton Wanderers.

== Final league table ==
Pos	Team	Pld	W	D	L	GF	GA	GD	Pts	Promotion or relegation
1	Portsmouth (C, P)	46	29	11	6	97	45	+52	98	Promotion to 2003–04 FA Premier League
2	Leicester City (P)	46	26	14	6	73	40	+33	92	Promotion to 2003–04 FA Premier League
3	Sheffield United	46	23	11	12	72	52	+20	80	Qualification for First Division Playoffs
4	Reading	46	25	4	17	61	46	+15	79	Qualification for First Division Playoffs
5	Wolverhampton Wanderers (O, P)	46	20	16	10	81	44	+37	76	Qualification for First Division Playoffs

Updated to match(es) played on 11 May 2003. Source: Soccerway
Rules for classification: 1) points; 2) goal difference; 3) number of goals scored.
(C) Champions; (O) Play-off winners; (P) Promoted

== Results ==
=== First Division ===
10 August 2002 1	Coventry City	2–1	Sheffield United	Highfield Road
15:00	Bothroyd 16'; McSheffrey 40'		Asaba 13'	Attendance: 18,839

13 August 2002 2	Sheffield United	1–1	Portsmouth	Bramall Lane
19:45	Ndlovu 12'		Burton 25'	Attendance: 16,093

17 August 2002 3	Sheffield United	1–1	Walsall	Bramall Lane
15:00	McGovern 40'		Corica 23'	Attendance: 14,011

24 August 2002 4	Burnley	0–1	Sheffield United	Turf Moor
15:00			Onuora 35'	Attendance: 12,868

27 August 2002 5	Sheffield United	3–1	Millwall	Bramall Lane
19:45	Asaba 77'; Tonge 82'; Ndlovu 90'		Ifill 89'	Attendance: 13,024

1 September 2002 6	Sheffield Wednesday	2–0	Sheffield United	Hillsborough
12:00	Owusu 73'; Kuqi 82'			Attendance: 27,075

7 September 2002 7	Norwich City	2–3	Sheffield United	Carrow Road
15:00	McVeigh 85'; Mackay 90'		Brown 1'; Tonge 6'; Asaba 31'	Attendance: 20,074

14 September 2002 8	Sheffield United	1–0	Rotherham United	Bramall Lane
15:00	Ndlovu 74'			Attendance: 19,948

17 September 2002 9	Sheffield United	2–1	Grimsby Town	Bramall Lane
19:45	Allison 82'; Tonge 89'		Robinson 8'	Attendance: 14,208

21 September 2002 10	Gillingham	1–1	Sheffield United	Priestfield Stadium
15:00	Shaw 16'		Allison 60'	Attendance: 7,497

28 September 2002 11	Sheffield United	1–2	Watford	Bramall Lane
15:00	Allison 10'		Cox 36' (pen.); Helguson 37'	Attendance: 16,301

5 October 2002 12	Wolverhampton Wanderers	1–3	Sheffield United	Molineux
15:00	Ullathorne 35' (o.g.)		Tonge 45', 50'; Allison 50'	Attendance: 24,625

19 October 2002 13	Brighton and Hove Albion	2–4	Sheffield United	Withdean Stadium
15:00	Hart 23'; Barrett 34'		Brown 70'; Asaba 77', 86' (pen.), 88' (pen.)	Attendance: 6,810

23 October 2002 14	Sheffield United	2–1	Stoke City	Bramall Lane
19:45	Handyside 62' (o.g); Brown 70' (pen.)		Greenacre 84'	Attendance: 15,163

26 October 2002 15	Sheffield United	1–1	Wimbledon	Bramall Lane
15:00	Asaba 90'		Connolly 12'	Attendance: 17,372

30 October 2002 16	Derby County	2–1	Sheffield United	Pride Park
19:45	McLeod 36'; Burton 86'		Murphy 23'	Attendance: 23,525

2 November 2002 17	Nottingham Forest	3–0	Sheffield United	City Ground
15:00	Lester 54', 61'; Harewood 63'			Attendance: 22,579

9 November 2002 18	Sheffield United	0–0	Ipswich Town	Bramall Lane
15:00				Attendance: 15,884

23 November 2002 19	Bradford City	0–5	Sheffield United	Valley Parade
15:00	Uhlenbeek (red card) 56'		Kabba 14'; Windass 40'; Murphy 59'; Brown 80' (pen.); Asab 88'	Attendance: 13,364

30 November 2002 20	Sheffield United	2–1	Crystal Palace	Bramall Lane
15:00	Windass 45'; Allison 89'		Riihilahti 69'	Attendance: 16,686

=== First Division play-offs ===
Round	Date	Opponent	Venue	Result	Attendance	Goalscorers
SF 1st leg	10 May 2003	Nottingham Forest	A	1–1	29,064	Brown (pen)
SF 2nd leg	15 May 2003	Nottingham Forest	H	4–3 (won 5–4 on agg)	30,212	Brown, Kabba, Peschisolido, Walker (own goal)
F	26 May 2003	Wolverhampton Wanderers	N	0–3	69,473	

=== FA Cup ===
Round	Date	Opponent	Venue	Result	Attendance	Goalscorers
R3	4 January 2003	Cheltenham Town	H	4–0	9,166	Murphy, McGovern, Kabba (2)
R4	25 January 2003	Ipswich Town	H	4–3	12,757	Brown (2), Jagielka, Peschisolido
R5	15 February 2003	Walsall	H	2–0	17,510	Mooney, Ndlovu
QF	9 March 2003	Leeds United	H	1–0	24,633	Kabba
SF	13 April 2003	Arsenal	N	0–1	59,170	

=== League Cup ===
Round	Date	Opponent	Venue	Result	Attendance	Goalscorers
R1	10 September 2002	York City	H	1–0	4,675	McGovern
R2	1 October 2002	Wycombe Wanderers	H	4–1	4,389	Boulding, Brown (2), Montgomery
R3	6 November 2002	Leeds United	H	2–1	26,663	Jagielka, Ndlovu
R4	3 December 2002	Sunderland	H	2–0	27,068	Murphy, Allison
R5	17 December 2002	Crystal Palace	H	3–1	22,211	Asaba, Peschisolido (2)
SF 1st leg	8 January 2003	Liverpool	H	2–1	30,095	Tonge (2)
SF 2nd leg	21 January 2003	Liverpool	A	0–2 (lost 2–3 on agg)	43,837	

== Players ==
=== First-team squad ===
Note: Flags indicate national team as defined under FIFA eligibility rules; some limited exceptions apply. Players may hold more than one non-FIFA nationality.

No.	Pos.	Nation	Player
1	GK	ENG	Simon Tracey
2	DF	ENG	Rob Kozluk
3	DF	ENG	Rob Ullathorne
4	DF	ENG	Steve Yates
5	DF	AUS	Shaun Murphy
6	DF	WAL	Rob Page (captain)
7	MF	ENG	Michael Brown
8	MF	SCO	Stuart McCall (Note: McCall was born in Leeds, England, but also qualified to represent Scotland internationally through his parents and represented them at U-21 level before making his international debut for Scotland in March 1990.) (assistant manager)
9	FW	ENG	Carl Asaba
10	FW	CAN	Paul Peschisolido
11	FW	NED	Laurens ten Heuvel
12	MF	SCO	Nick Montgomery (Note: Montgomery was born in Leeds, England, but also qualified to represent Scotland internationally and represented them at U-21 level.)
14	FW	ENG	Wayne Allison
15	DF	ENG	Ben Doane
16	FW	ZIM	Peter Ndlovu
17	MF	ENG	Phil Jagielka
18	MF	ENG	Michael Tonge
19	DF	FRA	Benoît Croissant

No.	Pos.	Nation	Player
20	MF	FRA	Jean-Philippe Javary
21	MF	IRL	Colin Cryan
22	DF	SCO	Grant Smith
23	GK	ENG	Paddy Kenny (Note: Kenny was born in Halifax, England, but also qualified to represent the Republic of Ireland internationally through his parents and would make his international debut for the Republic of Ireland in June 2004.)
24	GK	IRL	Gary Kelly (Note: Kelly was born in Preston, England, but also qualified to represent the Republic of Ireland internationally through his father and represented them at U-19, U-21, U-23, and B level.)
25	FW	ENG	Rob Nugent
26	FW	ENG	Mark Rankine (on loan from Preston North End)
27	FW	ENG	Lewis Killeen
28	FW	NIR	Owen Morrison
29	MF	ENG	Adam Baum
30	FW	ENG	Tyrone Thompson
31	FW	ENG	Ryan Mallon
32	FW	ENG	Dean Windass
34	FW	ENG	Steve Kabba
36	DF	ENG	John Curtis (on loan from Blackburn Rovers)
37	DF	ENG	Danny Wood
38	MF	NED	Marcel Cas
39	FW	SCO	Iffy Onuora

=== Left club during season ===
Note: Flags indicate national team as defined under FIFA eligibility rules; some limited exceptions apply. Players may hold more than one non-FIFA nationality.

No.	Pos.	Nation	Player
13	GK	NED	Wilko de Vogt (to RBC Roosendaal)
14	DF	ENG	Shane Nicholson (to Tranmere Rovers)
24	FW	ENG	Tommy Mooney (on loan from Birmingham City)
24	MF	SCO	Jon-Paul McGovern (on loan from Celtic)
26	DF	ENG	Jon Harley (on loan from Fulham)

No.	Pos.	Nation	Player
26	DF	ENG	Wayne Quinn (on loan from Newcastle United)
28	MF	ENG	Lee Featherstone (to Scunthorpe United)
35	MF	ENG	Michael Boulding (on loan from Aston Villa)
36	DF	ENG	Richard Edghill (released)
