= Battle of Bramall Lane =

2002 English First Division football match

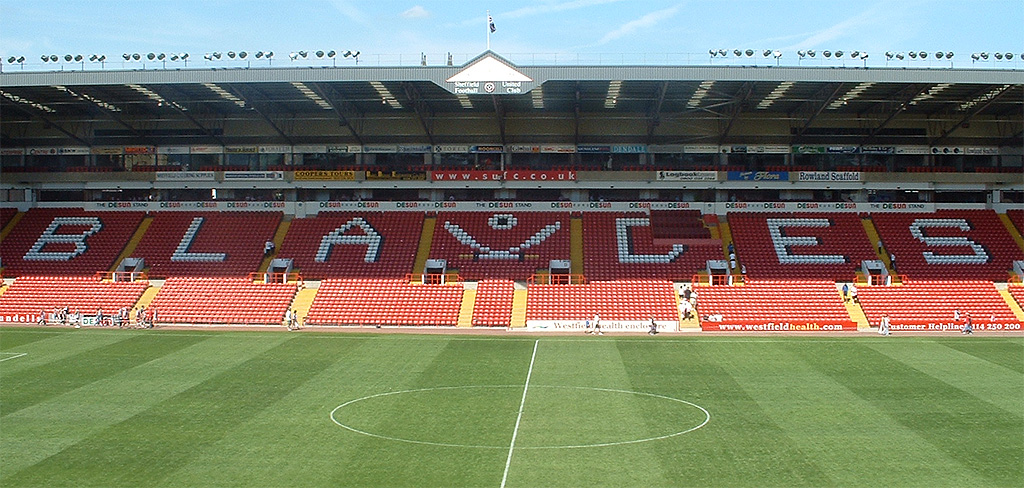
- Event: 2001–02 First Division
Sheffield United	West Bromwich Albion
0	3
- Match abandoned after 82 minutes with the score Sheffield United 0–3 West Bromwich Albion. The Football Association ruled score to stand for league standings.
- Date: 16 March 2002
- Venue: Bramall Lane, Sheffield
- Referee: Eddie Wolstenholme (Lancashire)
- Attendance: 17,653
- Weather: Partly cloudy

The "Battle of Bramall Lane" is a name used by the British press to refer to an English First Division football match played between Sheffield United and West Bromwich Albion at Bramall Lane, Sheffield on 16 March 2002. It is the only match in English professional football history to have been abandoned due to a shortage of players. Going into the match, Sheffield United were comfortably mid-table with neither promotion nor relegation possible, while Albion were fighting for promotion to the Premier League, the top flight of English football. The two clubs were not historically seen as rivals, and the fixture was not a local derby, but there was history between United midfielder Georges Santos and Albion midfielder Andy Johnson due to an injury Santos suffered from a collision with Johnson in a previous meeting.

United goalkeeper Simon Tracey was sent off in the 9th minute for deliberately handling the ball outside the area to stop a shot at goal. Albion striker Scott Dobie gave his side the lead going into half-time, and midfielder Derek McInnes doubled the lead in the 63rd minute, prompting United manager Neil Warnock to make two substitutions; Santos and Patrick Suffo came on, but both received red cards within moments. Santos committed a dangerous two-footed tackle on Johnson, and Suffo headbutted McInnes in the ensuing melee. Down to eight men, United conceded a third goal, with Dobie scoring his second of the afternoon. United midfielder Michael Brown and defender Robert Ullathorne suffered injuries that meant they could no longer take part in the match. Because United had already used all of their allowed substitutions, referee Eddie Wolstenholme, who had already declined to send off both Brown and captain Keith Curle for clear red-card offences, was forced to abandon the match in the 82nd minute, as dictated by the rules of the game.

A week later, Albion were awarded a 3–0 victory by The Football League, while United, Warnock and several United players received bans and fines from The Football Association. Warnock faced allegations of cheating from Albion manager Gary Megson, sparking a long-lasting feud between the two managers. Neither Santos nor Suffo ever played for United again, departing the club in the following months.

== Background ==
With eight league matches of the 2001–02 season remaining, West Bromwich Albion were in third place in the First Division on 67 points, 11 points behind their Black Country rivals Wolverhampton Wanderers, who occupied the second automatic promotion spot. Meanwhile, Sheffield United were in 15th position on 50 points, safe from relegation but not threatening the playoff places. Albion manager Gary Megson had nearly been appointed United manager in 1999, following a spell at Stoke City, and had a meeting with chairmen Derek Dooley and Bernard Procter; he turned down the role, citing his long-time affinity towards rivals Sheffield Wednesday, and United instead turned to Neil Warnock, who was manager going into the match.

In a First Division fixture on 10 March 2001 between United and Nottingham Forest, United midfielder Georges Santos was substituted off early in the match, with what was believed to be a concussion. Warnock revealed his disappointment that the referee took no action against Forest midfielder Andy Johnson, who had caused the injury. Santos underwent a five-and-a-half-hour operation on a double fracture of his eye socket, and spoke with his lawyers about the possibility of taking legal action. Johnson defended himself, saying he was "totally blameless", as it was Santos who was late in the challenge, but Warnock accused him of lying. Later in the year, Johnson moved to Albion.

The first fixture of the season between United and Albion was decided by a last-minute goal from Carl Asaba that gave United a 1–0 victory despite having Shane Nicholson sent off.

== Match ==
At the time the game was one of the easiest because what happened was taken out of my control. I didn’t have any choice with the red cards. Any referee would have done the same. I tried my best to finish the game because I could have sent Michael Brown off for a second yellow card, but I kept him on and then he went off injured. Then the last one I told him that you do realise I’m going to have to abandon the game if you go off

— Eddie Wolstenholme recalling how he refereed the game in a 2014 interview

Nine minutes into the match, United goalkeeper Simon Tracey was sent off by referee Eddie Wolstenholme for deliberately handling the ball outside the penalty area and denying Albion an obvious goalscoring opportunity. Sheffield United manager Neil Warnock sent on the substitute keeper, Wilko de Vogt, in place of striker Peter Ndlovu. Albion defender Lárus Sigurðsson received a yellow card shortly after. Albion opened the scoring in the 18th minute, when striker Scott Dobie headed in a cross from Andy Johnson.

Albion were unable to take further advantage of having an extra man until the 62nd minute, when captain Derek McInnes scored their second with a powerful shot, struck first-time from outside the area, that De Vogt was unable to reach. Warnock responded by making two substitutions, the last of his allowed three, in an attempt to make his team more attacking, taking off Gus Uhlenbeek and Michael Tonge for Georges Santos and Patrick Suffo.

The match quickly turned ugly; a stray ball from McInnes in midfield, later described by United striker Laurent D'Jaffo as a "pass from God", led to Santos being sent off for a high and poorly timed lunging tackle on Johnson, the studs of his boot connecting with the Welsh midfielder's shin. The two teams then began a mass brawl on the pitch, and amid the ensuing melee, Suffo headbutted McInnes in full view of referee Wolstenholme, an action so violent it caused the Albion player to bleed, and Suffo was also sent off. Albion defender Darren Moore was visibly angered by the actions of the United players, and had to be physically restrained by D'Jaffo; Johnson said it was like Moore "had the devil in him". By the time play resumed, United had been reduced to eight men, and had none of their three allotted substitutions remaining. Soon after, United captain Keith Curle was fortunate to avoid a sending off after appearing to throw punches at McInnes, as was Michael Brown for a foul on the same player, clambering over him as Albion made a breakaway. Wolstenholme later admitted to not awarding red cards and keeping both players on the field in order to finish the match.

In the 77th minute, Albion added a third goal when Dobie tapped in his second of the match from close range after United's defence were unable to clear an Albion corner kick. Two minutes later, Brown limped off for United with a suspected groin injury, and was soon followed by Robert Ullathorne, who went off injured in the 82nd minute suffering with muscle spasms, and reducing the team to six men. In accordance with Law 3 of the Laws of the Game, which states "that a match should not continue if there are fewer than seven players in either team", referee Wolstenholme abandoned the game with Albion leading 3–0, marking the first time in history that an English professional football match had ever been abandoned under this law.

=== Details ===
16 March 2002
15:00 GMT

Sheffield United	0–3 (Match abandoned after 82 minutes)	West Bromwich Albion
	Report	Dobie 18', 77'; McInnes 63'

Bramall Lane, Sheffield
Attendance: 17,653
Referee: Eddie Wolstenholme (Lancashire)

Sheffield United	West Bromwich Albion

GK	1	(England) Simon Tracey	(red card) 9'
RB	24	(Netherlands) Gus Uhlenbeek		(substituted off) 64'
CB	32	(Wales) Rob Page
CB	6	(England) Keith Curle (c)	(yellow card) 74'
LB	23	(England) Robert Ullathorne
CM	17	(England) Phil Jagielka
CM	26	(England) Michael Tonge		(substituted off) 64'
CM	7	(England) Michael Brown	(yellow card) 61'
RF	12	(Benin) Laurent D'Jaffo
CF	16	(Zimbabwe) Peter Ndlovu		(substituted off) 9'
LF	8	(Canada) Paul Peschisolido
Substitutes
GK	13	(Netherlands) Wilko de Vogt		(substituted on) 9'
MF	20	(France) Jean-Philippe Javary
MF	14	(Cape Verde) Georges Santos	(red card) 65'	(substituted on) 64'
MF	22	(Scotland) Nick Montgomery
FW	19	(Cameroon) Patrick Suffo	(red card) 65'	(substituted on) 64'
Manager
(England) Neil Warnock

GK	1	(England) Russell Hoult
RB	23	(England) Adam Chambers		(substituted off) 56'
CB	17	(Iceland) Lárus Sigurðsson	(yellow card) 13'	(substituted off) 68'
CB	6	(England) Phil Gilchrist
CB	15	(Jamaica) Darren Moore
LB	3	(England) Neil Clement
CM	16	(Slovakia) Igor Bališ
CM	10	(Wales) Andy Johnson		(substituted off) 71'
CM	4	(Scotland) Derek McInnes (c)
CF	18	(Scotland) Scott Dobie
CF	14	(England) Danny Dichio
Substitutes
GK	30	(England) Chris Adamson
DF	5	(England) Tony Butler		(substituted on) 68'
MF	20	(Portugal) Jordão		(substituted on) 71'
MF	7	(Montserrat) Ruel Fox
FW	9	(England) Bob Taylor		(substituted on) 56'
Manager
(England) Gary Megson

== Aftermath ==
After the match, Albion manager Gary Megson said:

There will be no replay. If we are called back to Bramall Lane, we shall kick-off and then walk off the pitch. I've been in professional football since 16 and I'm 42 now. I've never ever witnessed anything as disgraceful as that. There is no place for that in any game of football, let alone professional football.

Football League spokesman John Nagle released a statement saying, "The Football League have the authority to allow the result to stand, or to order the game to be replayed", and confirmed there would be a meeting the following Thursday to discuss the matter. Writing for the BBC, journalist Phil McNulty said he believed Neil Warnock and Sheffield United should face heavy punishment, and argued for a points deduction. Warnock, though, echoed Megson's comments, saying, "there is no place for that in any game of football, let alone a professional match", but joked that he'd "have brought a deckchair out on the pitch to keep one of [the injured players] on" had he known the match would be called off. In the changing room, Megson told Moore that if a replay was necessary, he would bring Albion's youth team. Speaking to the Lancashire Telegraph, referee Eddie Wolstenholme said he was correct in sending off all three of the United players, and knew immediately that, once Ullathorne was leaving the field due to injury, he would be forced to abandon the match.

Warnock faced accusations of cheating from Megson, who claimed that Warnock was telling his players to find a way to come off the field. Warnock described the comments as "disgraceful" and accused Megson of hypocrisy, drawing comparisons between his situation and that of Osama bin Laden, the mastermind of the September 11 attacks, which had occurred six months earlier. Brown and Ullathorne's injuries were legitimate, however; Brown missed the rest of the season, and Ullathorne missed the following four matches; Warnock was ultimately not mentioned in Wolstenholme's match report, declaring that his fourth official had not informed him of any remarks. Warnock placed Santos on the transfer list, and told Suffo he would never play for United again, and it marked the final time either player appeared for the club. Johnson accused Santos of deliberately attempting to hurt him or possibly end his career; he was forced to miss several matches with an injury. Less than two months after the match, Suffo left United and joined Spanish club Numancia, while Santos was released in the summer and ultimately signed for Grimsby Town following a trial period.

Albion were awarded a 3–0 win and the three points by The Football League. The decision was unanimous, and Nagle said "any other decision would be grossly unfair and set a precedent that would not be in the best interests of the game". United were fined £10,000 by The Football Association, Santos was given a six-match ban (four, plus two for violent conduct), Suffo paid a £3,000 fine and received a six-match ban (three for the dismissal, three for violent conduct), and Keith Curle was made to pay a fine of £500 and received a two-match ban, while Warnock was made to pay £300 for "improper conduct towards the fourth official", but no evidence was found that either he or any player had made a deliberate attempt to have the match abandoned. Following the verdict, Albion chief executive John Wile said there was no "bad blood" between the clubs, and said the decision to award the points was correct. Following United's midweek victory against Millwall, Warnock expressed his displeasure regarding the reaction he had received in the media, saying, "I thought in this country people are innocent until proven guilty, but some of the comments in the papers were out of order", and said he and his family had endured an "absolute bloody nightmare".

United ultimately finished the season 13th in the league table, while Albion finished second and were automatically promoted.

Pos	Team	Pld	W	D	L	GF	GA	GD	Pts	Notes
2	West Bromwich Albion	46	27	8	11	61	29	+32	89	Promoted to 2002–03 FA Premier League
13	Sheffield United	46	15	15	16	53	54	−1	60	

=== Legacy ===
The next meeting between the clubs came at Albion's stadium, The Hawthorns, on 14 October 2003, during the 2003–04 season. United won 2–0 to go top of the table. Warnock received an abusive reception from the Albion supporters and refused to shake Megson's hand before the match, but joked afterwards that he had a crash helmet in the event of a repeat. The return fixture came on 21 February 2004, and the away side again emerged victorious as Albion recovered from a goal down to win 2–1, with the winning goal coming five minutes from time. Megson praised his team for overcoming the negative atmosphere, in which both sets of supporters "exchanged derogatory chants with even greater fervour than is customary", according to The Guardian journalist John Ashdown; Albion midfielder Johnson was particularly targeted. The feud between Warnock and Megson continued when Megson moved to Nottingham Forest, and on one occasion Warnock was quoted as saying, "I wouldn't shake his hands in a million years. I wouldn't piss on him if he was on fire". In a 2022 interview with The Mirror, Megson described the name Battle of Bramall Lane as a misnomer as it "suggests there were two teams battling" and apportioned the blame solely to Warnock.

Speaking in 2020 to the Sheffield Star, Suffo explained that his actions were solely in defence of teammate Santos, and described it as a highlight of his career on par with winning the 2000 Olympics and playing in the 2002 FIFA World Cup for Cameroon, but also spoke of his regret of the incident as he had begun to feel settled at the club. The close relationship between United club executive Derek Dooley and Megson was said to be severely damaged by the event. Suffo's teammate Michael Brown later described the match as "bizarre" and "crazy", and spoke of his regret about being involved in such a match while appearing on BT Sport in 2020. Curle has described the match as "surreal" and "farcical", while Albion striker Bob Taylor believed it was unforgettable for those involved and in attendance.

== Other instances ==
- 4 January 1977, Estadio Centenario, Montevideo: Uruguay 1–1 Ecuador, match abandoned after 78 minutes due to Ecuador receiving five red cards.
- 14 November 2001, Estádio José Alvalade, Lisbon: Portugal 5–1 Angola, match abandoned after 67 minutes due to Angola receiving four red cards, and a player being injured after Angola had used all their substitutions.
- 10 March 2013, Harry Abrahams Stadium, London: Wingate and Finchley 0-1 Thurrock, match abandoned after 85 minutes due to Wingate and Finchley receiving five red cards.
- 18 February 2018, Estádio Manoel Barradas, Salvador: Bahia 3–0 Vitória, match abandoned after 80 minutes due to Vitória receiving five red cards. Bahia also had four red cards.
