= 1999–2000 Sheffield United F.C. season =

Sheffield United
1999–2000 season
- Manager: Adrian Heath (until 23 November); Neil Warnock (from 2 December)
- Stadium: Bramall Lane
- Football League First Division: 16th
- FA Cup: Fourth round
- Worthington Cup: Second round
- Top goalscorer: League: Bent (15); All: Bent (16)
- Average home league attendance: 13,718

During the 1999–2000 English football season, Sheffield United competed in the English First Division.

== Season summary ==
Steve Bruce resigned from his post as Sheffield United manager after just one season in charge, mentioning chaos in the club's boardroom meetings and a lack of transfer funds. Adrian Heath replaced him as boss but resigned after six months and long-time Sheffield United supporter Neil Warnock took over the reins and prevented a threat of relegation, securing a 16th-place finish. During the season, striker Lee Morris was sold to Derby County for a club-record transfer of £3m.

== Final league table ==
Pos	Team	Pld	W	D	L	GF	GA	GD	Pts
14	Nottingham Forest	46	14	14	18	53	55	−2	56
15	Crystal Palace	46	13	15	18	57	67	−10	54
16	Sheffield United	46	13	15	18	59	71	−12	54
17	Stockport County	46	13	15	18	55	67	−12	54
18	Portsmouth	46	13	12	21	55	66	−11	51

Rules for classification: 1) Points; 2) Goal difference; 3) Goals scored

== Results ==
Sheffield United's score comes first

=== Legend ===
Win	Draw	Loss

=== Football League First Division ===
Date	Opponent	Venue	Result	Attendance	Scorers
7 August 1999	Portsmouth	A	0–2	17,667	
14 August 1999	Walsall	H	1–1	12,581	Murphy
21 August 1999	Manchester City	A	0–6	30,110	
28 August 1999	Ipswich Town	H	2–2	12,455	Smith, Marcelo
30 August 1999	Tranmere Rovers	A	3–1	5,436	Devlin (2), Smith
4 September 1999	Crystal Palace	H	3–1	11,886	Marcelo (2), Ford
18 September 1999	Charlton Athletic	H	1–2	13,216	Kachura
25 September 1999	Wolverhampton Wanderers	H	3–0	14,163	Smith (2), Devlin
2 October 1999	Huddersfield Town	A	1–4	14,238	Murphy
9 October 1999	Crewe Alexandra	A	0–1	5,304	
16 October 1999	Nottingham Forest	H	2–1	15,687	Smith (2)
19 October 1999	Norwich City	H	0–0	11,907	
23 October 1999	Swindon Town	A	2–2	5,504	Smith (2)
26 October 1999	Wolverhampton Wanderers	A	0–1	24,402	
30 October 1999	Huddersfield Town	H	0–1	14,928	
6 November 1999	Barnsley	A	0–2	16,301	
14 November 1999	Bolton Wanderers	H	1–2	10,013	Bent
20 November 1999	Stockport County	A	1–1	6,614	Bent
23 November 1999	Port Vale	H	1–3	8,965	Sandford
27 November 1999	West Bromwich Albion	A	2–2	12,278	Smith, Ribeiro
30 November 1999	Queens Park Rangers	A	1–3	9,922	Devlin
4 December 1999	Portsmouth	H	1–0	10,834	Devlin
19 December 1999	Blackburn Rovers	H	2–1	10,437	Bent (2)
26 December 1999	Birmingham City	A	2–0	22,874	Devlin, Smith
28 December 1999	Fulham	H	2–0	17,375	Devlin, Bent
3 January 2000	Grimsby Town	A	2–2	7,618	Bent, Hall
15 January 2000	Walsall	A	1–2	6,222	Devlin
22 January 2000	Manchester City	H	1–0	23,862	Brown
29 January 2000	Ipswich Town	A	1–1	17,350	Bent
5 February 2000	Tranmere Rovers	H	3–1	14,219	Devlin, Bent, Ford
12 February 2000	Crystal Palace	A	1–1	14,877	Bent
19 February 2000	West Bromwich Albion	H	6–0	14,519	Bent (3), Devlin, Notman, Brown
26 February 2000	Charlton Athletic	A	0–1	19,249	
5 March 2000	Queens Park Rangers	H	1–1	11,554	Notman
7 March 2000	Barnsley	H	3–3	22,376	Notman, Brown, Bent
11 March 2000	Port Vale	A	3–2	5,484	Bent, Woodhouse, D'Jaffo
18 March 2000	Stockport County	H	1–0	14,907	Woodhouse
21 March 2000	Bolton Wanderers	A	0–2	11,891	
25 March 2000	Birmingham City	H	1–2	15,486	Bent
1 April 2000	Blackburn Rovers	A	0–5	17,769	
8 April 2000	Grimsby Town	H	0–0	11,612	
15 April 2000	Fulham	A	0–4	12,197	
22 April 2000	Nottingham Forest	A	0–0	17,172	
24 April 2000	Crewe Alexandra	H	1–1	9,923	Woodhouse
28 April 2000	Norwich City	A	1–2	16,921	Devlin (pen)
7 May 2000	Swindon Town	H	2–2	12,603	Quinn, Burley

=== FA Cup ===
Round	Date	Opponent	Venue	Result	Attendance	Goalscorers
R3	12 December 1999	Rushden & Diamonds	H	1–1	10,104	Bent
R3R	21 December 1999	Rushden & Diamonds	A	1–1 (won 6–5 on pens)	6,010	Derry
R4	8 January 2000	Newcastle United	A	1–4	36,220	Smith

=== League Cup ===
Round	Date	Opponent	Venue	Result	Attendance	Goalscorers
R1 1st Leg	10 August 1999	Shrewsbury Town	H	3–0	6,419	Kachura, Smith (2)
R1 2nd Leg	24 August 1999	Shrewsbury Town	A	3–0 (won 6–0 on agg)	1,723	Marcelo (2), Smith
R2 1st Leg	14 September 1999	Preston North End	H	2–0	5,350	Smith, Kachura
R2 2nd Leg	21 September 1999	Preston North End	A	0–3 (lost 2–3 on agg)	5,658	

== Players ==
=== First-team squad ===
Squad at end of season

Note: Flags indicate national team as defined under FIFA eligibility rules; some limited exceptions apply. Players may hold more than one non-FIFA nationality.

No.	Pos.	Nation	Player
3	DF	(England) ENG	Wayne Quinn
4	DF	(England) ENG	Lee Sandford
5	DF	(England) ENG	Rob Kozluk
6	MF	(England) ENG	Jonathan Hunt
7	DF	(Australia) AUS	Shaun Murphy
8	MF	(England) ENG	Curtis Woodhouse
9	FW	(England) ENG	Marcus Bent
10	MF	(England) ENG	Paul Devlin
11	MF	(England) ENG	Bobby Ford
12	FW	(France) FRA	Laurent D'Jaffo (Note: D'Jaffo was born in Bazas, France, but also qualified to represent Benin internationally and made his international debut for Benin in 2002.)
13	GK	(England) ENG	Simon Tracey
14	GK	(England) ENG	Matt Duke
15	MF	(England) ENG	Ian Hamilton
16	MF	(Belgium) BEL	Axel Smeets
18	DF	(Belgium) BEL	Davy Gysbrechts
19	DF	(England) ENG	Andy Woodward

No.	Pos.	Nation	Player
20	MF	(England) ENG	Stuart Wilson (on loan from Leicester City)
21	DF	(England) ENG	Jon O'Connor
23	MF	(England) ENG	Kevin Davies
25	DF	(England) ENG	Ben Doane
26	FW	(England) ENG	Paul Macari
27	MF	(England) ENG	Adam Burley
28	FW	(England) ENG	Paul Burke
29	DF	(England) ENG	Mark Camm
30	DF	(England) ENG	Craig McAughtrie
31	DF	(England) ENG	Matt Mosley
33	FW	(Northern Ireland) NIR	Andy Smith
35	MF	(Portugal) POR	Bruno Ribeiro
37	MF	(England) ENG	Michael Brown
38	FW	(Scotland) SCO	Alex Notman (on loan from Manchester United)
40	DF	(England) ENG	Phil Jagielka

=== Left club during season ===
Note: Flags indicate national team as defined under FIFA eligibility rules; some limited exceptions apply. Players may hold more than one non-FIFA nationality.

No.	Pos.	Nation	Player
1	GK	(Northern Ireland) NIR	Aidan Davison (Note: Davison was born in Sedgefield, England, but also qualified to represent Northern Ireland internationally and made his international debut for Northern Ireland in April 1996.) (to Bradford City)
2	MF	(England) ENG	Shaun Derry (to Portsmouth)
9	FW	(Brazil) BRA	Marcelo (to Birmingham City)
12	MF	(England) ENG	Lee Morris (to Derby County)
12	MF	(Republic of Ireland) IRL	Brian Launders (released)
19	DF	(England) ENG	Martin Smith (to Huddersfield Town)
20	DF	(England) ENG	Nicky Marker (to Cheltenham Town)

No.	Pos.	Nation	Player
20	DF	(England) ENG	Sagi Burton (Note: Burton was born in Birmingham, England, but also qualified to represent Saint Kitts and Nevis internationally and would make his international debut for Saint Kitts and Nevis in June 2004.) (to Port Vale)
22	MF	(England) ENG	Jon Cullen (to Peterborough United)
22	FW	(Belarus) BLR	Pyotr Kachura (to Chengdu Wuniu)
24	MF	(England) ENG	Dane Whitehouse (retired)
32	GK	(England) ENG	Leigh Walker (to Barnsley)
34	DF	(England) ENG	Jody Craddock (on loan from Sunderland)
36	MF	(Jamaica) JAM	Paul Hall (Note: Hall was born in Manchester, England, but also qualified to represent Jamaica internationally and made his international debut for Jamaica in 1997.) (on loan from Coventry City)
