= 2003–04 Sheffield United F.C. season =

Sheffield United
2003–04 season
- Manager: Neil Warnock
- Stadium: Bramall Lane
- First Division: 8th
- FA Cup: Sixth round
- League Cup: Second round
- Top goalscorer: League: Lester (12); All: Lester (15)
- Average home league attendance: 21,646

During the 2003–04 English football season, Sheffield United competed in the Football League First Division.

== Season summary ==
Sheffield United were unable to repeat the previous season's heroics, finishing 8th in the First Division, a mere two points off the play-off places.

== Kit ==
The kit was manufactured by French company Le Coq Sportif and sponsored by Desun.

== Final league table ==
Pos	Team	Pld	W	D	L	GF	GA	GD	Pts	Promotion, qualification or relegation
6	Crystal Palace (O, P)	46	21	10	15	72	61	+11	73	Qualification for the First Division play-offs
7	Wigan Athletic	46	18	17	11	60	45	+15	71	
8	Sheffield United	46	20	11	15	65	56	+9	71	
9	Reading	46	20	10	16	55	57	−2	70	
10	Millwall	46	18	15	13	55	48	+7	69	Qualification for the UEFA Cup first round (Note: Since the FA Cup winners Manchester United qualified for the Champions League, their place in the UEFA Cup went to Millwall, who were the FA Cup runners-up.)

Source: Soccerway
Rules for classification: 1) points; 2) goal difference; 3) number of goals scored.
(O) Play-off winners; (P) Promoted

== Players ==
=== First-team squad ===
Squad at end of season

Note: Flags indicate national team as defined under FIFA eligibility rules; some limited exceptions apply. Players may hold more than one non-FIFA nationality.

No.	Pos.	Nation	Player
1	GK	(Republic of Ireland) IRL	Paddy Kenny (Note: Kenny was born in Halifax, England, but also qualified to represent the Republic of Ireland internationally through his parents and made his international debut for the Republic of Ireland in June 2004.)
2	DF	(England) ENG	Rob Kozluk
3	DF	(England) ENG	Chris Armstrong
4	MF	(Scotland) SCO	Nick Montgomery (Note: Montgomery was born in Leeds, England, but also qualified to represent Scotland internationally and represented them at U-21 level.)
5	DF	(England) ENG	Chris Morgan
6	DF	(Wales) WAL	Rob Page
7	FW	(England) ENG	Paul Shaw
8	MF	(Scotland) SCO	Stuart McCall (Note: McCall was born in Leeds, England, but also qualified to represent Scotland internationally through his parents and represented them at U-21 level before making his international debut for Scotland in March 1990.) (assistant manager)
9	FW	(England) ENG	Ashley Ward
11	FW	(England) ENG	Jack Lester
12	MF	(England) ENG	Andy Parkinson
13	GK	(England) ENG	Kristian Rogers
14	FW	(England) ENG	Wayne Allison
15	FW	(England) ENG	Steve Kabba
16	FW	(Zimbabwe) ZIM	Peter Ndlovu
17	MF	(England) ENG	Phil Jagielka
18	MF	(England) ENG	Michael Tonge

No.	Pos.	Nation	Player
19	FW	(Scotland) SCO	Andy Gray (Note: Gray was born in Harrogate, England, but also qualified to represent Scotland internationally through his father and made his international debut for Scotland in April 2003.)
20	FW	(England) ENG	Izale McLeod (on loan from Derby County)
21	FW	(England) ENG	Mark Rankine
22	DF	(England) ENG	Alan Wright
23	MF	(Republic of Ireland) IRL	Colin Cryan
24	DF	(England) ENG	Mike Whitlow
25	DF	(England) ENG	Simon Francis
26	FW	(England) ENG	Kevan Hurst
27	MF	(England) ENG	Ashley Sestanovich
28	MF	(England) ENG	Ian Ross
29	DF	(England) ENG	Danny Wood
30	MF	(Netherlands) NED	Dries Boussatta
31	DF	(England) ENG	Dominic Roma
32	FW	(England) ENG	Jonathan Forte (Note: Forte was born in Sheffield, England, and represented them at U-16, U-17, and U-18 level, but also qualified to represent Barbados internationally through his father and would make his international debut for Barbados in March 2010.)
34	GK	(Serbia and Montenegro) SCG	Sasa Ilic (Note: Ilić was born in Melbourne, Australia, but also qualified to represent Serbia and Montenegro internationally and made his international debut for Serbia and Montenegro in December 1998.)
35	DF	(England) ENG	Ben Purkiss

=== Left club during season ===
Note: Flags indicate national team as defined under FIFA eligibility rules; some limited exceptions apply. Players may hold more than one non-FIFA nationality.

No.	Pos.	Nation	Player
7	MF	(England) ENG	Michael Brown (to Tottenham Hotspur)
10	FW	(Canada) CAN	Paul Peschisolido (to Derby County)
19	FW	(Scotland) SCO	Iffy Onuora (to Grimsby Town)
19	FW	(England) ENG	Dean Sturridge (on loan from Wolverhampton Wanderers)
20	MF	(France) FRA	Jean-Philippe Javary (released)
20	MF	(Wales) WAL	Carl Robinson (on loan from Portsmouth)
20	DF	(England) ENG	Jon Harley (on loan from Fulham)

No.	Pos.	Nation	Player
20	GK	(Sweden) SWE	Lee Baxter (to IFK Göteborg)
22	FW	(Netherlands) NED	Laurens ten Heuvel (to De Graafschap)
25	GK	(England) ENG	Paul Gerrard (on loan from Grimsby Town)
25	GK	(Northern Ireland) NIR	Alan Fettis (on loan from Hull City)
30	GK	(England) ENG	Ben Scott (to Hereford United)
32	MF	(England) ENG	Anthony Tansley (to Alfreton Town)
