= Derek Dooley =

Derek Dooley may refer to:

- Derek Dooley (American football) (born 1968), former head American football coach at Louisiana Tech University and the University of Tennessee
- Derek Dooley (footballer) (1929–2008), English football player and manager
