= 2005–06 Sheffield United F.C. season =

Sheffield United
2005–06 season
- Chairman: Kevin McCabe
- Manager: Neil Warnock
- Stadium: Bramall Lane
- Championship: 2nd (promoted)
- FA Cup: Third round
- League Cup: Third round
- Top goalscorer: League: Shipperley (11); All: Shipperley (11)
- Average home league attendance: 23,650

During the 2005–06 English football season, Sheffield United competed in the Football League Championship.

== Season summary ==
The 2005–06 season was Sheffield United's twelfth straight season at the second level of the English football pyramid – a period longer than any other team currently in the Championship, and their longest spell in any Division since 1934.

After beating Cardiff City 1–0 on Good Friday and never being outside of the top two places all season, the Blades required only one point from their final three games to secure their promotion. A day later, however, Leeds United failed to beat Reading at Elland Road, which saw Sheffield United promoted back to the Premiership after many disappointments in the previous few seasons.

== Kit ==
United's kit was manufactured by French company Le Coq Sportif and sponsored by HFS Loans.

== Players ==
=== First-team squad ===
Squad at end of season

Note: Flags indicate national team as defined under FIFA eligibility rules; some limited exceptions apply. Players may hold more than one non-FIFA nationality.

No.	Pos.	Nation	Player
1	GK	IRL	Paddy Kenny (Note: Kenny was born in Halifax, England, but also qualified to represent the Republic of Ireland internationally through his parents and made his international debut for the Republic of Ireland in June 2004.)
2	DF	ENG	Leigh Bromby
3	MF	ENG	Garry Flitcroft
4	DF	ENG	Craig Short
5	DF	ENG	Chris Morgan (captain)
6	MF	ENG	Phil Jagielka (vice captain)
7	MF	BRB	Paul Ifill (Note: Ifill was born in Brighton, England, but also qualified to represent Barbados internationally through his parents and made his international debut for Barbados in June 2004.)
8	FW	NGA	Ade Akinbiyi (Note: Akinbiyi was born in Hackney, England, but also qualified to represent Nigeria internationally through his parents and made his international debut for Nigeria in 1999.)
9	FW	ENG	Neil Shipperley
10	FW	ENG	Danny Webber
11	FW	ENG	Steve Kabba
12	MF	IRL	Alan Quinn
13	GK	ENG	Phil Barnes
14	FW	ENG	Bruce Dyer (Note: Dyer was born in Redbridge, England, and represented them at U-21 level, but played a friendly game against Ashford Town in September 2007 for Montserrat.)
15	DF	ENG	Rob Kozluk
16	DF	ENG	Simon Francis
17	MF	SCO	Nick Montgomery (Note: Montgomery was born in Leeds, England, but also qualified to represent Scotland internationally and represented them at U-21 level.)
18	MF	ENG	Michael Tonge
19	MF	NIR	Keith Gillespie
20	DF	ENG	Chris Armstrong

No.	Pos.	Nation	Player
21	FW	ENG	Jonathan Forte (Note: Forte was born in Sheffield, England, and represented them at U-16, U-17, and U-18 level, but also qualified to represent Barbados internationally through his father and would make his international debut for Barbados in March 2010.)
22	MF	ENG	Ian Ross
23	MF	ENG	Kevan Hurst
24	DF	ENG	David Unsworth
25	DF	ENG	Alan Wright
26	DF	IRL	Derek Geary
27	FW	ENG	Brian Deane
29	FW	ENG	Luke Beckett
30	FW	ENG	Geoff Horsfield (on loan from West Bromwich Albion)
31	DF	ENG	Nicky Law
32	DF	ENG	Kyle McFadzean
34	FW	IRL	Gary Mulligan
35	FW	ENG	Colin Marrison
36	DF	ENG	Evan Horwood
37	MF	ENG	Kyle Nix (Note: Nix was born in Sydney, Australia, but was raised in England and represented them at U-16, U-18, U-20, and C level.)
38	MF	IRL	Stephen Quinn
39	FW	China	Hao Haidong
40	GK	ENG	Jamie Annerson
44	DF	ENG	Chris Lucketti

=== Left club during season ===
Note: Flags indicate national team as defined under FIFA eligibility rules; some limited exceptions apply. Players may hold more than one non-FIFA nationality.

No.	Pos.	Nation	Player
3	DF	ENG	Jon Harley (to Burnley)
8	FW	SCO	Andy Gray (Note: Gray was born in Harrogate, England, but also qualified to represent Scotland internationally through his father and made his international debut for Scotland in April 2003.) (to Sunderland)}
8	FW	FRA	Vincent Péricard (Note: Péricard was born in Efok, Cameroon, but also qualified to represent France internationally and has represented them at U-21 level.) (on loan from Portsmouth)
14	MF	FRA	Lilian Nalis (to Plymouth Argyle)

No.	Pos.	Nation	Player
28	FW	ENG	Billy Sharp (to Scunthorpe United)
28	DF	SCO	Neill Collins (on loan from Sunderland)
30	FW	ENG	Paul Shaw (to Rotherham United)
—	FW	ENG	Jake Speight (to Scarborough)

=== Reserve squad ===
The following players did not appear for the first-team this season.

Note: Flags indicate national team as defined under FIFA eligibility rules; some limited exceptions apply. Players may hold more than one non-FIFA nationality.

No.	Pos.	Nation	Player
—	MF	CAN	Ryan Gyaki

== Transfers ==
=== In ===
==== Summer ====
Squad #	Position	Player	Transferred from	Fee	Date	Source
4	DF	(England) Craig Short	(England) Blackburn Rovers	Free	29 June 2005	
34	FW	(Republic of Ireland) Gary Mulligan	(England) Wolverhampton Wanderers	Free	3 July 2005	
37	MF	(England) Kyle Nix	(England) Aston Villa	Free	5 July 2005	
9	FW	(England) Neil Shipperley	(England) Crystal Palace	Free	20 July 2005	
19	MF	(Northern Ireland) Keith Gillespie	(England) Leicester City	Free	5 August 2005	
24	DF	(England) David Unsworth	(England) Portsmouth	Free	22 August 2005	

==== Winter ====
Squad #	Position	Player	Transferred from	Fee	Date	Source
27	FW	(England) Brian Deane	(Australia) Perth Glory	Free	23 December 2005	
3	DF	(England) Gary Flitcroft	(England) Blackburn Rovers	Free	12 January 2006	
8	FW	(Nigeria) Ade Akinbyi	(England) Burnley	£1.75m	26 January 2006	
14	FW	(England) Bruce Dyer	(England) Stoke City	Free	26 January 2006	

== Final league table ==
Pos	Team	Pld	W	D	L	GF	GA	GD	Pts	Promotion, qualification or relegation
1	Reading (C, P)	46	31	13	2	99	32	+67	106	Promotion to the FA Premier League
2	Sheffield United (P)	46	26	12	8	76	46	+30	90	Promotion to the FA Premier League
3	Watford (O, P)	46	22	15	9	77	53	+24	81	Qualification for Championship play-offs
4	Preston North End	46	20	20	6	59	30	+29	80	Qualification for Championship play-offs
5	Leeds United	46	21	15	10	57	38	+19	78	Qualification for Championship play-offs

Updated to match(es) played on 2 December 2011. Source: RSSSF
Rules for classification: 1) points; 2) goal difference; 3) number of goals scored.
(C) Champions; (O) Play-off winners; (P) Promoted

== Results ==
Sheffield United's score comes first

=== Legend ===
Win	Draw	Loss

=== Football League Championship ===
Date	Opponent	Venue	Result	Attendance	Scorers
6 August 2005	Leicester City	H	4–1	18,224	Gray (pen), Kabba (pen), Ifill, Bromby
9 August 2005	Burnley	A	2–1	11,802	Shipperley, Morgan
13 August 2005	Queens Park Rangers	A	1–2	13,497	Kabba
20 August 2005	Preston North End	H	2–1	20,519	Shipperley, Webber
27 August 2005	Coventry City	H	2–1	17,739	Kabba, Unsworth (pen)
29 August 2005	Crewe Alexandra	A	3–1	7,501	Shipperley, Quinn, Kabba
10 September 2005	Ipswich Town	H	2–0	21,059	Kabba (2)
13 September 2005	Brighton & Hove Albion	A	1–0	6,553	Jagielka
17 September 2005	Watford	A	3–2	15,399	Jagielka, Ifill, Carlisle (own goal)
24 September 2005	Derby County	H	2–1	22,192	Unsworth, Ifill
27 September 2005	Plymouth Argyle	H	2–0	20,111	Shipperley, Quinn
1 October 2005	Reading	A	1–2	22,068	Kabba
15 October 2005	Wolverhampton Wanderers	H	1–0	25,533	Shipperley
18 October 2005	Millwall	A	4–0	9,148	Webber (2), Péricard, Quinn
21 October 2005	Leeds United	A	1–1	23,600	Kabba
29 October 2005	Cardiff City	H	0–0	25,311	
1 November 2005	Luton Town	H	4–0	22,554	Jagielka (2), Morgan, Péricard
5 November 2005	Crystal Palace	A	3–2	20,344	Jagielka, Ifill, Shipperley
19 November 2005	Millwall	H	2–2	22,292	Unsworth, Webber
22 November 2005	Wolverhampton Wanderers	A	0–0	24,240	
26 November 2005	Leicester City	A	2–4	22,382	Kabba, Webber
3 December 2005	Sheffield Wednesday	H	1–0	30,558	Quinn
10 December 2005	Burnley	H	3–0	23,118	Shipperley (2), Webber
16 December 2005	Preston North End	A	0–0	14,378	
26 December 2005	Norwich City	H	1–3	26,505	Jagielka
28 December 2005	Southampton	A	1–0	27,443	Shipperley
31 December 2005	Stoke City	H	2–1	21,279	Montgomery, Morgan
3 January 2006	Hull City	A	3–1	21,929	Ifill, Webber, Armstrong
14 January 2006	Ipswich Town	A	1–1	23,794	Webber
21 January 2006	Brighton & Hove Albion	H	3–1	27,514	Jagielka, Ifill, Tonge
1 February 2006	Derby County	A	1–0	26,275	Akinbiyi
6 February 2006	Watford	H	1–4	20,791	Ifill
11 February 2006	Plymouth Argyle	A	0–0	15,017	
14 February 2006	Reading	H	1–1	25,011	Dyer
18 February 2006	Sheffield Wednesday	A	2–1	33,439	Tonge, Akinbiyi
25 February 2006	Queens Park Rangers	H	2–3	25,360	Akinbiyi, Bircham (own goal)
3 March 2006	Crewe Alexandra	H	0–0	22,691	
11 March 2006	Coventry City	A	0–2	23,506	
18 March 2006	Norwich City	A	1–2	25,346	Armstrong
25 March 2006	Southampton	H	3–0	22,824	Jagielka, Ifill, Shipperley
1 April 2006	Stoke City	A	1–1	17,544	Webber
8 April 2006	Hull City	H	3–2	26,324	Shipperley, Ifill, Unsworth
14 April 2006	Cardiff City	A	1–0	11,006	Webber
18 April 2006	Leeds United	H	1–1	29,329	Bakke (own goal)
22 April 2006	Luton Town	A	1–1	10,248	Tonge
30 April 2006	Crystal Palace	H	1–0	27,120	Morgan

=== FA Cup ===
Round	Date	Opponent	Venue	Result	Attendance	Goalscorers
R3	7 January 2006	Colchester United	H	1–2	11,820	Kabba

=== League Cup ===
Round	Date	Opponent	Venue	Result	Attendance	Goalscorers
R1	23 August 2005	Boston United	H	1–0	6,014	Ross
R2	20 September 2005	Shrewsbury Town	A	0–0 (won 4–3 on pens)	4,250	
R3	25 October 2005	Reading	A	0–2	11,607	
