= Michael Tonge =

English footballer (born 1983)

Personal information
- Full name: Michael William Eric Tonge
- Date of birth: 7 April 1983 (age 43)
- Place of birth: Manchester, England
- Height: 1.83 m (6 ft 0 in)
- Position: Midfielder

Youth career
- Manchester United
- 1999–2001: Sheffield United

Senior career*
Years	Team	Apps	(Gls)
2001–2008	Sheffield United	262	(21)
2008–2013	Stoke City	12	(0)
2009–2010	→ Preston North End (loan)	7	(0)
2010	→ Derby County (loan)	18	(2)
2010	→ Preston North End (loan)	5	(1)
2012	→ Barnsley (loan)	10	(0)
2012	→ Leeds United (loan)	19	(4)
2013–2015	Leeds United	49	(0)
2015	→ Millwall (loan)	6	(0)
2015–2017	Stevenage	56	(3)
2017–2019	Port Vale	34	(3)
Total		478	(34)

International career
2002	England U20	2	(0)
2003–2004	England U21	2	(0)
- * Club domestic league appearances and goals

Michael William Eric Tonge (born 7 April 1983) is an English football coach and former player. A midfielder, he scored 39 goals in 544 league and cup appearances in a 19-year career in the English Football League.

A former England under-21 international, he began his career in Manchester United's youth team before joining Sheffield United in 2001. He soon became a vital player for Neil Warnock's "Blades". He was named on the First Division's PFA Team of the Year in 2002–03 before he helped the Bramall Lane side achieve promotion to the Premier League in 2005–06. After making 302 appearances for the club, he was sold to Stoke City in August 2008 for £2 million. He struggled to break into the first-team at Stoke, however. He was sent out on loan to Championship teams Preston North End (twice), Derby County, Barnsley and Leeds United. He joined Leeds permanently in January 2013. He joined Millwall on loan in January 2015 before he was released from Leeds in May 2015. He signed with Stevenage five months later and was voted the club's Player of the Year for the 2015–16 season. After his 18-month spell ended, he joined Port Vale in July 2017.

He began his coaching career at Huddersfield Town in November 2020.

== Playing career ==
=== Sheffield United ===
Born in Manchester, Tonge was signed as a youth team player by Sheffield United manager Steve Bruce when he was released by Manchester United. He made his first-team debut as a 68th-minute substitute for Darren Bullock in a 1–0 defeat to Wimbledon at Bramall Lane. He made his first senior start in the last game of the 2000–01 season, a 1–1 draw away at Bolton Wanderers. He scored his first competitive goal for the "Blades" in a 1–0 home victory over Crewe Alexandra on 27 October 2001. He went on to establish himself in the first-team under manager Neil Warnock, scoring three goals in 32 appearances throughout the 2001–02 season.

On 8 January 2003, he scored both of United's goals in a 2–1 win over Liverpool in the first leg of the semi-final of the League Cup. United also reached the semi-finals of the FA Cup, losing 1–0 to Arsenal at Old Trafford. United finished third in the First Division, and reached the play-off final, where they again faced disappointment with a 3–0 defeat to Wolverhampton Wanderers at the Millennium Stadium. Having scored eight goals in 58 appearances, Tonge was named on the First Division PFA Team of the Year in 2002–03, alongside midfield teammate Michael Brown.

Tonge scored four goals in 51 games across the 2003–04 campaign as United posted an eighth-place finish, two points outside the play-offs. He then scored three goals in 41 games in the 2004–05 season, as the club again finished in eighth place, this time six points shy of the play-off places. He scored three goals from 33 appearances in the 2005–06 campaign as United secured promotion out of the Championship as runners-up behind Reading. The club lasted just one season in the Premier League, with Tonge scoring twice in 28 matches as United were relegated on the last day of the 2006–07 season following a 2–1 home defeat to Wigan Athletic. He scored in Bryan Robson's first game as manager of the club, a 2–2 home draw with Colchester United on 11 August 2007. Tonge made 52 appearances during the 2007–08 campaign, but United struggled. Robson was sacked in February before his replacement, Kevin Blackwell, led the club to a ninth-place finish.

=== Stoke City ===
On 1 September 2008, Tonge signed for Premier League side Stoke City for a fee of £2 million. He made his "Potters" debut in a 3–2 defeat to Everton at the Britannia Stadium on 14 September. Tonge failed to establish himself in the Stoke squad and only made a further nine appearances in the 2008–09 season, of which only one was as a starter in the league. Having been limited to just three League Cup appearances at the start of the 2009–10 season, he joined Championship side Preston North End on loan on 19 November 2009. Manager Alan Irvine attempted to extend the loan deal, but was unsuccessful as Tonge played seven games for the "Lilywhites" before he was recalled from his loan spell at Deepdale on 31 December by Stoke manager Tony Pulis. On 1 February 2010, Tonge signed for Derby County on loan until end of the 2009–10 season, with manager Nigel Clough saying Tonge had "proven pedigree". Tonge scored his first goal for the "Rams" in a 2–0 win over Watford on 6 March. His loan spell proved successful, and after Tonge scored twice in 19 starts, Clough attempted to secure his services on loan for the following campaign. Still struggling for first-team appearances at Stoke, Tonge returned to Preston North End on a month long loan on 17 November 2010, along with fellow Stoke teammate Danny Pugh. This was extended until 16 January 2011 after he impressed manager Darren Ferguson with his consistency. He scored his first goal for Preston in a 1–1 draw with Cardiff on 4 December.

Tonge completed a full pre-season prior to the 2011–12 season, playing in all but one of Stoke's games and scoring in the 3–1 friendly win against Austrian side SV Thal. On 18 August, he made his first start of the season in Stoke's 1–0 Europa League play-off win against FC Thun, making his European debut in the process. However, Tonge was subsequently left out of Stoke's 25-man Premier League and 23-man Europa League squads for the first half of the season, which meant he was only eligible to play in domestic cup and reserve team games. On 24 January 2012, Tonge again returned to the Championship after joining Barnsley on loan until the end of the 2011–12 season. He made his debut seven days later, playing 66 minutes in a 3–2 win over Derby County at Oakwell. He made seven starts and three substitute appearances for Keith Hill's "Tykes". Tonge was again left out of Stoke's 25-man squad for the 2012–13 season.

=== Leeds United ===
On 13 September 2012, Tonge linked up with his former Sheffield United manager Neil Warnock and joined Leeds United on loan until December 2012. Tonge made his Leeds United debut on 15 September, partnering Rodolph Austin in central midfield during a 2–1 defeat at Cardiff City. He scored his first goal for Leeds when he scored the winner against Bristol City in a 3–2 victory on 29 September. Tonge scored his second Leeds goal with a long range strike against Sheffield Wednesday in a 1–1 draw. He continued his goal scoring form for Leeds against Southampton in a 3–0 League Cup win. After his loan deal expired on 23 December, Warnock revealed he wanted to sign Tonge permanently. Tonge signed a two-and-a-half-year contract with Leeds in January 2013. He ended the 2012–13 campaign with five goals from 39 games.

He struggled to gain a first-team place under manager Brian McDermott during the 2013–14 campaign and made only 15 league starts. He managed to return to the starting line-up under Dave Hockaday's brief reign at the start of the 2014–15 season, but was dropped by his successors Neil Redfearn and Darko Milanič. On 2 February 2015, Tonge was allowed to join Championship rivals Millwall on loan until the end of the 2014–15 season. Manager Ian Holloway said that Tonge's versatility could prove vital following recent injuries to Nicky Bailey and Angel Martinez. He played six games for the "Lions" during his stay at The Den, but did not feature after Neil Harris replaced Holloway in April in an unsuccessful attempt to steer the club away from relegation. In May 2015, Leeds announced that they would release Tonge after opting not to be renew his contract.

=== Stevenage ===
Tonge joined League Two side Stevenage on an initial three-month deal on 19 October 2015. He made his debut in a 1–1 draw at Portsmouth the following day, and earned praise from assistant manager Kevin Watson, who said: "that is how you play football. He's obviously played at a higher level". However, he was sent off for the first time in his career during his third match for the "Boro", after committing a two-footed challenge on John Lundstram during a 5–1 defeat to Oxford United at Broadhall Way. He regained his first-team place after serving his suspension and went on to extend his contract for a further 18 months, leaving manager Teddy Sheringham to remark that "he's a top professional... he's got the enthusiasm of an 18-year-old [and] I think he's come in and he's done a real job for us in midfield". He scored two goals from 30 games in the 2015–16 season as Stevenage posted an 18th-place finish. He was named as the club's Player of the Year ahead of defender Fraser Franks, though he finished second to Franks in the Season Ticket Holders Player of the Year, BoroChat Player of the Year and the Players Player of the Year votes.

Tonge struggled for game time at the start of the 2016–17 season but was praised by manager Darren Sarll for working with youngsters Henry Cowans and Dale Gorman in training.> He scored one goal from 31 games as Stevenage improved on the previous campaign to finish in tenth spot, before he was released in May 2017.

=== Port Vale ===
Tonge signed a one-year contract with newly relegated League Two side Port Vale on 4 August 2017 after impressing manager Michael Brown – a former Sheffield United teammate – on a trial basis. He scored on his debut for the "Valiants" with a deflected free kick in a 3–1 win at Crawley Town on 5 August, and also provided an assist for Antony Kay from another set piece. On 26 August, he was sent off for a late challenge on George Cooper in a 1–0 defeat to local rivals Crewe Alexandra at Vale Park. He became a first-team regular under new manager Neil Aspin from December, who praised his composure and attitude. He scored three goals in 38 matches during the 2017–18 campaign and triggered a one-year extension to his contract after meeting an appearance clause. However, he featured for just 16 minutes on the opening day of the 2018–19 season and new Vale manager John Askey confirmed that he would not be offering Tonge a new contract on 16 May.

== International career ==
=== Under-20s ===
Tonge earned his first cap for the England U20 national side in November 2002 when he featured in the Under-20 Four Nations Tournament. On 27 November, Tonge started the 5–3 defeat against Italy at the Stadium of Light, he played 68-minutes before being replaced by Jerome Thomas. The following month Tonge played in the 2–0 defeat against Switzerland, he replaced Darren Carter just after half-time at Upton Park. England finished third place in the tournament.

=== Under-21s ===
On 5 September 2003, Tonge made his debut for the England U21s when he started the 1–1 draw with Macedonia during qualifying for the 2004 UEFA European Under-21 Championship. He played 73-minutes at the Čair Stadium in Skopje before being replaced by Jermain Defoe. Four days later, Tonge was an unused substitute as England lost 2–1 against Portugal and were eliminated from the tournament. His last cap came in March 2004 when he started the 2–2 draw with Sweden in Kristianstad.

== Coaching career ==
Tonge was appointed as a coach at the Huddersfield Town Academy in November 2020.

== Personal life ==
Tonge was robbed at knife-point in September 2009, alongside fellow footballers Grant Smith, Steven Spencer and Phil Jagielka at Jagielka's Cheshire mansion.

== Career statistics ==
Appearances and goals by club, season and competition
Club	Season	League			FA Cup		League Cup		Other		Total	
Club	Season	Division	Apps	Goals	Apps	Goals	Apps	Goals	Apps	Goals	Apps	Goals
Sheffield United	2000–01	First Division	2	0	0	0	0	0	0	0	2	0
Sheffield United	2001–02	First Division	30	3	2	0	0	0	0	0	32	3
Sheffield United	2002–03	First Division	44	6	4	0	7	2	3 (Note: Appearance(s) in play-offs.)	0	58	8
Sheffield United	2003–04	First Division	46	4	3	0	2	0	0	0	51	4
Sheffield United	2004–05	Championship	34	2	5	0	2	1	0	0	41	3
Sheffield United	2005–06	Championship	30	3	1	0	2	0	0	0	33	3
Sheffield United	2006–07	Premier League	27	2	1	0	0	0	0	0	28	2
Sheffield United	2007–08	Championship	45	1	3	0	4	0	0	0	52	1
Sheffield United	2008–09	Championship	4	0	0	0	1	0	0	0	5	0
Sheffield United	Total		262	21	19	0	18	3	3	0	302	24
Stoke City	2008–09	Premier League	10	0	1	0	0	0	—		11	0
Stoke City	2009–10	Premier League	0	0	0	0	3	0	—		3	0
Stoke City	2010–11	Premier League	2	0	1	0	1	0	—		4	0
Stoke City	2011–12	Premier League	0	0	0	0	0	0	1 (Note: Appearance(s) in UEFA Europa League.)	0	1	0
Stoke City	2012–13	Premier League	0	0	0	0	0	0	—		0	0
Stoke City	Total		12	0	2	0	4	0	1	0	19	0
Preston North End (loan)	2009–10	Championship	7	0	0	0	—		0	0	7	0
Derby County (loan)	2009–10	Championship	18	2	1	0	0	0	0	0	19	2
Preston North End (loan)	2010–11	Championship	5	1	0	0	0	0	—		5	1
Barnsley (loan)	2011–12	Championship	10	0	—		—		—		10	0
Leeds United	2012–13	Championship	35	4	1	0	3	1	—		39	5
Leeds United	2013–14	Championship	23	0	0	0	2	0	—		25	0
Leeds United	2014–15	Championship	10	0	0	0	2	0	—		12	0
Leeds United	Total		68	4	1	0	7	1	0	0	76	5
Millwall (loan)	2014–15	Championship	6	0	—		—		—		6	0
Stevenage	2015–16	League Two	29	2	1	0	—		—		30	2
Stevenage	2016–17	League Two	27	1	0	0	2	0	2 (Note: Appearance(s) in EFL Trophy.)	0	31	1
Stevenage	Total		56	3	1	0	2	0	2	0	61	3
Port Vale	2017–18	League Two	33	3	2	0	1	1	2	0	38	4
Port Vale	2018–19	League Two	1	0	0	0	0	0	0	0	1	0
Port Vale	Total		34	3	2	0	1	1	2	0	39	4
Career total			478	34	26	0	32	5	8	0	544	39

== Honours ==
Sheffield United

- Football League Championship second-place promotion: 2005–06

Individual

- PFA Team of the Year: 2002–03 First Division
- Stevenage Player of the Year: 2015–16
