= Michael Brown (footballer, born 1977) =

English footballer, manager, and pundit

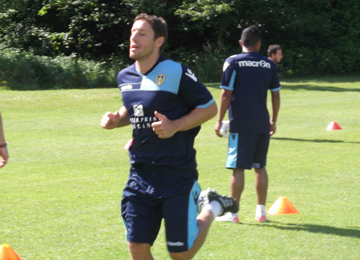
- Brown training with Leeds United in 2011

Personal information
- Full name: Michael Robert Brown
- Date of birth: 25 January 1977 (age 49)
- Place of birth: Hartlepool, England
- Height: 1.76 m (5 ft 9 in)
- Position: Midfielder

Youth career
- Manchester City

Senior career*
Years	Team	Apps	(Gls)
1994–1999	Manchester City	88	(2)
1997	→ Hartlepool United (loan)	6	(1)
1999	→ Portsmouth (loan)	4	(0)
1999–2000	→ Sheffield United (loan)	4	(0)
2000–2004	Sheffield United	147	(27)
2004–2006	Tottenham Hotspur	50	(2)
2006–2007	Fulham	41	(0)
2007–2009	Wigan Athletic	58	(0)
2009–2011	Portsmouth	45	(4)
2011–2014	Leeds United	66	(2)
2014–2017	Port Vale	52	(4)
Total		561	(42)

International career
1996	England U21	4	(0)

Managerial career
- 2016–2017: Port Vale
- * Club domestic league appearances and goals

Michael Robert Brown (born 25 January 1977) is an English former professional footballer and football manager who now works as a pundit.

An England under-21 international midfielder, his hard-tackling style sometimes caused him to take criticism from others in the game. He began his career with Manchester City having come through their youth ranks. He was named the club's Player of the Year in 1998 before featuring in their Second Division play-off final victory in 1999. He also spent time on loan at Hartlepool United, Portsmouth and Sheffield United, before he was sold to Sheffield United for a £400,000 fee in January 2000. He scored 36 goals in 174 appearances during a four-year stay in Sheffield, being named as the club's Player of the Year in 2002 and named on the PFA Team of the Year the following year.

He moved back to the Premier League with Tottenham Hotspur for a £500,000 fee in January 2004. After two years with Spurs, he moved on to Fulham for an 18-month stay. He was transferred to Wigan Athletic in July 2007, where he would spend two seasons before making the move to Portsmouth in August 2009. He played for the club in their 2010 FA Cup final defeat to Chelsea, but could not prevent them from being relegated out of the top-flight that same year. He joined Leeds United in July 2011 and went on to spend the next three years at Elland Road. He signed with Port Vale in July 2014 and also took on a coaching role with them before becoming assistant manager to Bruno Ribeiro in June 2016. He was promoted to caretaker manager following Ribeiro's resignation in December 2016. Still, he could not prevent relegation from EFL League One at the end of the 2016–17 season, after which he was confirmed as the club's permanent manager. With the club lying bottom of the English Football League, he was sacked in September 2017. He has since gone on to work as a pundit and summariser for BBC Sport, Sky Sports and Quest.

== Early life ==
Brown was born in Hartlepool on 25 January 1977. His father, Robert (Bobby), helped to run Hartlepool Lion Hillcarter F.C. His mother, Barbara, was involved with the Hartlepool netball club, Oakesway. Brown attended High Tunstall Comprehensive School and represented the school football team at county level.

== Club career ==
=== Manchester City ===
Brown graduated through the Manchester City youth scheme before signing professionally for the club on 13 September 1994. While a youth player he played in several positions before establishing himself as a central midfielder. He captained the youth team in the 1994–95 season, leading to involvement with the first-team in the 1995 pre-season. Brown made his debut for Manchester City on 26 August 1995 against Queens Park Rangers at Loftus Road, in which Brown was sent off only 10 minutes after coming on as a substitute for Steve Lomas. Despite this inauspicious start to his career he was played from the start four days later at Maine Road as City were beaten 2–0 by Everton. He went on to feature as the "Citizens" main back-up player, making 16 Premier League starts and five substitute appearances during the 1995–96 relegation season.

He began the 1996–97 season as a first-team regular under manager Alan Ball after midfielder Garry Flitcroft had left the club. He reflected about the first-team opportunities, saying: "I was very young and was playing well in the youth team, the first-team weren't doing so well and I kind of got fast-tracked into the squad. I got a chance and did okay. I played quite a lot that season which was fantastic. Alan was the manager and he gave me a chance. It was a great club and to be at that age and go from nowhere to the first-team was pretty special." However, Ball was sacked and his successor Steve Coppell and Coppell's successor Frank Clark kept Brown out of the starting line-up. He was instead loaned out to his home town club Hartlepool United in March 1997 and featured in six Third Division matches at Victoria Park under Mick Tait's stewardship. He scored his first goal in the Football League for "Pools", opening the scoring in a 2–1 win over Darlington at Feethams on 19 April.

Brown worked his way back into the "Sky Blues" starting eleven midway through the 1997–98 season and scored his first goal for the club in the FA Cup on 3 January in a 2–0 win over Bradford City. In total, he made 27 appearances during the 1997–98 campaign as City were relegated out of the First Division. One of the few causes for optimism during a bad spell, he was named the club's Player of the Year.

He became a key member of the squad that won promotion out of the Second Division, featuring 39 times throughout the 1998–99 campaign. He started in the play-off final against Gillingham at Wembley Stadium, before being replaced by Ian Bishop after 61 minutes.

However, Joe Royle never utilised Brown in the First Division, and he was instead loaned out to divisional rivals Portsmouth in November 1999, who were then managed by his former City boss Alan Ball. He played four games for "Pompey" but left Fratton Park days before Ball was sacked.

=== Sheffield United ===
Newly appointed Sheffield United manager Neil Warnock was impressed by Brown in his performance for Portsmouth in a 1–0 defeat to United at Bramall Lane on 4 December, and subsequently took Brown on loan later that month. After only four performances for the "Blades" Warnock was convinced enough to spend £400,000 take Brown to Bramall Lane permanently. He scored his first goal for his new club against his former employers, Manchester City, in a 1–0 home win on 22 January. He ended the 1999–2000 season with three goals in 24 games.

He made 40 appearances during the 2000–01 campaign and scored against Steel City rivals Sheffield Wednesday in a 2–1 League Cup defeat at Hillsborough on 1 November. Brown heavily featured in the Battle of Bramall Lane; he limped off the field with an injury on 79 minutes leaving the game desperately short of players, and two minutes after he left the field another injury left United with only six players, forcing the game to be abandoned. He learned to add goals to his game during the 2001–02 season as Stuart McCall's defensive ability allowed Brown more licence to join the attack; he hit seven goals in 40 appearances and won the club's Player of the Year award.

He scored 22 goals in 54 appearances in the 2002–03 season and was named on the PFA Team of the Year alongside midfield partner Michael Tonge as they helped United to finish third in the First Division. He scored in both legs of the play-off semi-final victory over Nottingham Forest, and then played at the Millennium Stadium in the play-off final defeat to Wolverhampton Wanderers, missing a 48th-minute penalty when Wolves were already three goals ahead.

Leeds United were linked with a £6 million approach for both Phil Jagielka and Brown in August 2003, though Sheffield United denied ever receiving such an offer. However, after being sent off twice in the first half of the 2003–04 season, manager Neil Warnock confirmed that with Brown out of contract at the end of the season he would be looking to sell Brown to the highest bidder.

=== Tottenham Hotspur ===
Brown was signed by Tottenham Hotspur in January 2004 for a fee of £500,000. He scored his first top-flight goal in a 4–4 draw with Leicester City at White Hart Lane on 22 February. He played a total of 19 games for David Pleat's "Spurs" during the second half of the 2003–04 season.

He made 34 appearances in the 2004–05 campaign and scored goals against Norwich City in the league and against Bolton Wanderers in the League Cup. Brown's position in midfield for Tottenham was in a much deeper role than his position for Sheffield United. He found himself becoming a more defensive-minded midfielder. Although well appreciated by fans for his hard work and honest contribution, the strengthening of the Spurs midfield under Martin Jol threatened Brown's position in the team with signings like Edgar Davids, Hossam Ghaly and Danny Murphy adding competition for places with Michael Carrick and Jermaine Jenas already at the club.

Brown was limited to just 11 appearances in the first half of the 2005–06 season and was moved on to Fulham in January 2006.

=== Fulham ===
He played seven games for the "Cottagers" towards the end of the 2005–06 season. He was handed the captaincy by manager Chris Coleman. Reflecting on his captaincy, Brown said: "I just want to be playing football as much as I can and now with the added reward of being made captain it makes it even better." He made 37 appearances in the 2006–07 season as Fulham finished two places and one point above the relegation zone. However, Lawrie Sanchez was brought in after the departure of Coleman and in the close season, he signed many new players – including midfielders Chris Baird, Lee Cook and Steven Davis – and Brown became surplus to requirements under Sanchez.

=== Wigan Athletic ===
Brown signed for Wigan Athletic on a three-year deal in July 2007. The manager who signed Brown, Chris Hutchings, was sacked not long after taking charge and replaced by manager Steve Bruce. Under Bruce, Brown formed midfield partnerships with Lee Cattermole and Wilson Palacios. He went on to make 56 Premier League appearances for the "Latics" in the 2007–08 and 2008–09 campaigns. However, he fell out of favour at the DW Stadium under new manager Roberto Martínez.

=== Portsmouth ===
In August 2009, he joined fellow Premier League side Portsmouth for a nominal fee. On 11 April, Brown helped the club to reach the FA Cup final with a 2–0 victory over his former club Tottenham Hotspur at Wembley. He scored his first goal at Fratton Park in a 2–1 defeat to Aston Villa seven days later. On 15 May, Brown was in the Portsmouth side that lost 1–0 to Chelsea in the FA Cup final after a 59th minute Didier Drogba goal. With Portsmouth in serious financial trouble and many players leaving the club, Brown was a constant throughout the side. Although Portsmouth were relegated at the end of the season, Brown opted to stay at Fratton Park. Manager Avram Grant also left the club and was replaced by Steve Cotterill.

On 16 October 2010, Brown scored the winning goal in a 3–2 home win over Watford and remained almost ever-present for Portsmouth throughout the following months until both he and "Pompey" teammate Richard Hughes reached the stage where they would both be entitled to new contracts with increased wages which the club could not afford (Brown was reportedly paid £25,000 a week) if they played another game. Brown was offered a revised contract at lower pay but did not accept the offer. Cotterill reluctantly put the players up for sale. Brown played 24 times and scored three goals for Portsmouth during the 2010–11 season, with his last game before the contract cause would have been activated coming on 26 December 2010. He was released by the club in May 2011, following the expiry of his contract.

=== Leeds United ===
Brown signed for Championship club Leeds United on a one-year contract with the option of a further year in July 2011. He made his debut for the "Whites" on the opening day of the 2011–12 season in the 3–1 defeat against Southampton. After missing some games with a calf injury, Brown returned to the starting line-up at Elland Road against Crystal Palace on 10 September. He did not play for another month before making his return as a second-half substitute against Leicester City on 6 November. Brown came into the Leeds side for his first start since early September on 29 November in Leeds' emphatic 4–0 win against Nottingham Forest. During the pre-match warm-up for Leeds' FA Cup game against Arsenal at the Emirates Stadium, Brown kicked a ball into the face of pundit Martin Keown who was doing punditry pitch-side with Robbie Savage for ESPN's coverage of the game – he claimed that he had in fact been aiming for Savage. He endured numerous spells out of the first-team until manager Simon Grayson was replaced by his former Sheffield United boss Neil Warnock in February 2012. He scored his first goal for Leeds in a 7–3 defeat by Nottingham Forest on 20 March. He was sent off for the first time as a Leeds player when he was given a straight red against Derby County on 9 April.

Warnock revealed that the contract Brown signed in August 2012 would be on a reduced wage, but he felt Brown was the type of player he wanted to keep around the club both on and off the pitch. Brown scored his first goal of the 2012–13 season on 2 November in a 2–2 draw with Brighton & Hove Albion; the goal was awarded to Brown despite deflecting off teammate Luciano Becchio. On 5 April 2013, just days after the sacking of manager Neil Warnock, Brown activated an appearance-based clause on his contract to extend his contract at Leeds into a third year.

Brown played 19 games during the 2013–14 season and was released by owner Massimo Cellino in May 2014. Cellino also believed the number 17 to be unlucky and asked manager Brian McDermott to retire the number following Brown's departure, leaving him to be the last player to wear that number for Leeds, until the number was unretired in 2019, when Hélder Costa wore that shirt number.

=== Port Vale ===
Brown signed a one-year contract with League One club Port Vale in July 2014; manager Micky Adams also gave him the responsibility of coaching the reserve team. He scored the only goal of the game on 15 November, helping the "Valiants" to a 1–0 win over Rochdale at Vale Park; his performance in the match earned him a place on the Football League Team of the Week. He went on to state that he aimed to continue playing football up until he was 40. Despite his age he proved a key first-team player, scoring six goals in 39 appearances in the 2014–15 campaign, and had to focus his time on playing rather than coaching.

He lost his first-team place during the 2015–16 season, but despite not playing a game for eight weeks, he managed to replace a suspended Anthony Grant and play the full 90 minutes of a 1–0 win over Bury on 28 December. He was named in the Football League Team of the Week for his performance during a 1–0 win at Blackpool on 9 January. In May 2016, chairman Norman Smurthwaite announced that Brown would assist him in appointing a successor to departing manager Rob Page. Brown was appointed as new manager Bruno Ribeiro's assistant in June 2016; the pair had played together at Sheffield United. He picked up a knee ligament injury in pre-season which kept him out of action for the opening weeks of the 2016–17 season. In May 2017, he confirmed he would remain registered as a player to provide emergency cover during the 2017–18 season.

== International career ==
Brown made his debut for the England under-21s in the 1–0 defeat to Croatia at Roker Park on 23 April 1996. The match was only the second time in England U21 history that none of the starting lineup went on to win senior international caps. The following month he featured in the 1996 Toulon Tournament and played in the group games against Belgium, Angola and Portugal.

== Managerial career ==
Bruno Ribeiro resigned as manager of Port Vale on 26 December 2016, and Brown was placed in temporary charge. Four days later Vale recorded a 1–0 home victory over Chesterfield in Brown's first match in charge. In the January transfer window he was forced to sell goalkeeper Jak Alnwick and reigning Player of the Year Anthony Grant, whilst top-scorer Alex Jones's loan deal expired and six other players left the club; Brown brought in youngsters Callum Guy, Tyler Walker, Olamide Shodipo, Axel Prohouly and Leo Fasan on loan, and signed Scott Tanser, Chris Eagles and Danny Pugh on free transfers. However, his team were dogged by injury problems, and Brown told the media that if he could keep the Vale out of the relegation zone that would be an achievement "off the scale". Having scored just one goal in their final seven games, Vale were relegated at the end of the campaign after drawing their final game 0–0 with Fleetwood, finishing one point short of safety.

Despite being relegated, Brown was confirmed as the club's permanent manager in May 2017. He released 13 players at the end of the 2016–17 season. His first summer signing was former two-time Player of the Year Tom Pope on a free transfer after he managed to secure his release from Bury. He went on to sign ten more players during the window: goalkeepers Rob Lainton and Sam Hornby, defenders Joe Davis, Antony Kay, Gavin Gunning, Lawrie Wilson and Graham Kelly, midfielders Michael Tonge, Cristian Montaño, David Worrall and Harry Middleton, and striker Tyrone Barnett; he also signed youngsters Rekeil Pyke, Marcus Harness, Tyler Denton, Ben Whitfield, Jack Stobbs and Tom Anderson on loan. However, Vale suffered their worst start to a season in 50 years at the beginning of the 2017–18 season, going a club record six games without scoring a goal as they sat bottom of the table in September following six consecutive league defeats. He was sacked on 16 September following a 1–1 home draw with second-from-bottom Forest Green Rovers. Speaking after his sacking, Brown said that it had been difficult for him to recruit quality players on "a very tight budget... I think it was arguably £1m under from when they had got promoted from that league the time previously". Supporter website OneValeFan described this as "a somewhat unlikely claim" as the club had only exited administration in November 2012.

== Media career ==
Since leaving Port Vale in September 2017, Brown has worked as a pundit and summariser for BBC Sport, Sky Sports and Quest.

== Style of play ==
Brown was criticised throughout his career for his heavy tackling. Throughout his career, he received 137 yellow cards and seven red cards. He was sent off for three clubs in the Premier League, with tackles on Ryan Giggs, Ashley Cole and Sean Davis being highlighted. Davis accused Brown of trying to break his leg, a claim which Brown described as "sickening". Brown injured Barnsley captain Jacob Butterfield with a tackle in January 2012; Butterfield claimed after the game he felt that the challenge from Brown was 'malicious' and 'intentional' and he revealed that Brown rang him after the game to apologise. He broke the ankle of Reading's Jem Karacan with a sliding challenge on 7 April 2012; Reading captain Jobi McAnuff heavily criticised the challenge after the game.

== Career statistics ==
=== Club ===
Appearances and goals by club, season and competition
Club	Season	League			FA Cup		League Cup		Other		Total	
Club	Season	Division	Apps	Goals	Apps	Goals	Apps	Goals	Apps	Goals	Apps	Goals
Manchester City	1994–95	Premier League	0	0	0	0	0	0	—		0	0
Manchester City	1995–96	Premier League	21	0	0	0	1	0	—		22	0
Manchester City	1996–97	First Division	11	0	1	0	2	0	—		14	0
Manchester City	1997–98	First Division	25	0	2	1	0	0	—		27	1
Manchester City	1998–99	Second Division	31	2	3	1	1	0	4 (Note: 1 appearance in the Football League Trophy and 3 appearances in the play-offs.)	0	39	3
Manchester City	1999–2000	First Division	0	0	0	0	1	0	—		1	0
Manchester City	Total		88	2	6	2	5	0	4	0	103	4
Hartlepool United (loan)	1996–97	Third Division	6	1	—		—		—		6	1
Portsmouth (loan)	1999–2000	First Division	4	0	0	0	—		—		4	0
Sheffield United	1999–2000	First Division	24	3	0	0	0	0	—		24	3
Sheffield United	2000–01	First Division	36	1	0	0	4	1	—		40	2
Sheffield United	2001–02	First Division	36	6	2	1	2	0	—		40	7
Sheffield United	2002–03	First Division	40	16	4	2	7	2	3 (Note: Appearance(s) in the play-offs.)	2	54	22
Sheffield United	2003–04	First Division	15	1	0	0	1	1	—		16	2
Sheffield United	Total		151	27	6	3	14	4	3	2	174	36
Tottenham Hotspur	2003–04	Premier League	17	1	2	0	—		—		19	1
Tottenham Hotspur	2004–05	Premier League	24	1	6	0	4	1	—		34	2
Tottenham Hotspur	2005–06	Premier League	9	0	1	0	1	0	—		11	0
Tottenham Hotspur	Total		50	2	9	0	5	1	0	0	64	3
Fulham	2005–06	Premier League	7	0	—		—		—		7	0
Fulham	2006–07	Premier League	34	0	3	0	0	0	—		37	0
Fulham	Total		41	0	3	0	0	0	0	0	44	0
Wigan Athletic	2007–08	Premier League	31	0	2	0	1	0	—		34	0
Wigan Athletic	2008–09	Premier League	25	0	1	0	2	0	—		28	0
Wigan Athletic	2009–10	Premier League	2	0	0	0	0	0	—		2	0
Wigan Athletic	Total		58	0	3	0	3	0	0	0	64	0
Portsmouth	2009–10	Premier League	24	2	6	0	3	0	—		33	2
Portsmouth	2010–11	Championship	21	2	0	0	3	1	—		24	3
Portsmouth	Total		45	4	6	0	6	1	0	0	57	5
Leeds United	2011–12	Championship	24	1	1	0	1	0	—		26	1
Leeds United	2012–13	Championship	24	1	4	0	5	0	—		33	1
Leeds United	2013–14	Championship	18	0	0	0	1	1	—		19	1
Leeds United	Total		66	2	5	0	7	1	0	0	78	3
Port Vale	2014–15	League One	36	4	0	0	2	2	1 (Note: Appearance(s) in the Football League Trophy.)	0	39	6
Port Vale	2015–16	League One	13	0	0	0	0	0	1	0	14	0
Port Vale	2016–17	League One	3	0	0	0	0	0	0	0	3	0
Port Vale	2017–18	League Two	0	0	0	0	0	0	0	0	0	0
Port Vale	Total		52	4	0	0	2	2	2	0	56	6
Career total			561	42	38	5	42	9	9	2	650	58

=== Managerial ===
As of match played 16 September 2017

Managerial record by team and tenure
Team	From	To	Record					Ref
Team	From	To	P	W	D	L	Win %	Ref
Port Vale	26 December 2016	16 September 2017	34	6	9	19	17.6	
Total			34	6	9	19	17.6	—

== Honours ==
Manchester City

- Football League Second Division play-offs: 1999

Portsmouth

- FA Cup runner-up: 2009–10

Individual

- Manchester City Player of the Year: 1997–98
- Sheffield United Player of the Year: 2001–02
- PFA Team of the Year: 2002–03 First Division
