= Ben Doane =

English footballer

Personal information
- Full name: Ben Nigel David Doane
- Date of birth: 22 December 1979 (age 46)
- Place of birth: Sheffield, England
- Height: 5 ft 10 in (1.78 m)
- Position: Defender

Youth career
- 1996–1999: Sheffield United

Senior career*
Years	Team	Apps	(Gls)
1999–2003	Sheffield United	23	(1)
2000	→ Kettering Town (loan)	3	(0)
2003	→ Mansfield Town (loan)	11	(0)
Total		37	(1)
- * Club domestic league appearances and goals

Benjamin Nigel David Doane (born 22 December 1979) is an English, former footballer who played as a defender. Born in Sheffield he spent his entire playing career with his hometown club, Sheffield United save for two short loan spells with Kettering Town and Mansfield Town.

== Career ==
Doane was a product of Sheffield United's youth system and, on graduating to the senior squad, signed a professional deal in July 1998. Having made his debut in a 3–0 League Cup victory over Shrewsbury Town in August 1999, Doane was the fringes of the first-team for a number of years, and was never able to maintain any consistent form, making only sporadic appearances for the Blades. In January 2000 Doane was loaned to Conference Premier side Kettering Town for the remainder of the season, where he made four appearances for the Poppies before returning to Bramall Lane.

Doane continued to make occasional appearances for United, with his most consistent run coming in the Autumn of 2001 when he made eight consecutive starts. Having received a red card during a league game against Walsall in November of that year, Doane returned from his suspension to find himself largely relegated to the reserves once more. However, he did score his first goal the club in a 2–2 draw with Crewe Alexandra on 30 March 2002. The following season Doane agreed a three-month loan deal with Second Division side Mansfield Town, where he played regularly, making eleven appearances.

Returning to United after his successful loan spell, Doane was recalled to the Blades first team for a league game against Wimbledon but sustained a serious ankle injury in the closing stages of the match. Doane never recovered from this injury and was forced to retire from playing in May 2003.

== Career statistics ==
As of 7 April 2003.

Club	Season	Division	League		FA Cup		League Cup		Other		Total	
Club	Season	Division	Apps	Goals	Apps	Goals	Apps	Goals	Apps	Goals	Apps	Goals
Sheffield United	1999–2000	First Division	1	0	0	0	1	0	0	0	2	0
Kettering Town (loan)	1999–2000	Conference	3	0	0	0	0	0	1	0	4	0
Sheffield United	2000–2001	First Division	3	0	0	0	0	0	0	0	3	0
Sheffield United	2001–2002	First Division	14	1	0	0	0	0	0	0	14	1
Sheffield United	2002–2003	First Division	5	0	0	0	2	0	0	0	7	0
Mansfield Town (loan)	2002–2003	Second Division	11	0	0	0	0	0	0	0	11	0
Sheffield United total			23	1	0	0	3	0	0	0	26	1
Career total			35	1	0	0	3	0	1	0	39	1
