= Ryan Mallon =

English footballer (born 1983)

Personal information
- Date of birth: 22 March 1983 (age 43)
- Place of birth: Sheffield, England
- Height: 5 ft 09 in (1.75 m)
- Position: Forward

Youth career
- 1999–2001: Sheffield United

Senior career*
| Years | Team | Apps | (Gls) |
| 2001–2003 | Sheffield United | 1 | (0) |
| 2002 | → Halifax Town (loan) | 18 | (8) |
| 2002–2003 | → Scarborough (loan) | 7 | (1) |
| 2003–2005 | Halifax Town | 49 | (5) |
| 2005 | → Gainsborough Trinity (loan) | | (?) |
| 2005–2006 | York City | 5 | (0) |
| 2006–2010 | Gainsborough Trinity | | (?) |
| 2010–2011 | Worksop Town | 12 | (2) |
| 2011–2012 | Matlock Town | | |
| 2012 | Frickley Athletic | | |
| 2012–2013 | Belper Town | | |
- * Club domestic league appearances and goals as of 31 October 2008

Ryan Mallon (born 22 March 1983 in Sheffield, England) is an English footballer who is without a club. He has previously played for Sheffield United, Halifax Town, Scarborough, York City and Gainsborough Trinity and Worksop Town FC.

== Career ==
=== Sheffield United ===
Ryan started his professional career with Sheffield United in 2001. His only game for The Blades was in a 3–1 League win over Grimsby Town. Ryan came on as a substitute in the 89th minute to replace Peter Ndlovu a minute after Grimsby had pulled a goal back through Menno Willems. He was loaned out to Halifax Town in 2002 and became an instant hit at The Shay when he notched up eight goals in eighteen games. He also spent time on loan with Scarborough before being released by Blades Neil Warnock at the end of the 2002–2003 season.

=== Halifax Town ===
Mallon returned to Halifax following his productive loan spell in the previous season. However amongst much expectation the youngster failed to produce the form that had earned him a permanent contract at the Yorkshire club. Ryan was loaned out to Gainsborough Trinity for the remaining quarter of the 2004–2005 season before being released by Halifax in the summer.

=== York City ===
Despite interest from Gainsborough, Mallon opted to stay in the Conference league and signed with York City.

=== Gainsborough Trinity ===
After a fruitless stay with York, Mallon was released and re-joined Gainsborough on a free transfer. It was at The Northolme where Mallon would finally find his feet and has been an integral part of the club setup since joining. Ryan signed a new deal with Gainsborough Trinity in June 2007.

=== Worksop Town ===
Mallon was released by Trinity on 12 February 2010 and subsequently signed for Worksop Town.

== Honours ==
Individual

- Football Conference Goalscorer of the Month: October 2002
