= Patrick Suffo =

Cameroonian footballer (born 1978)

Personal information
- Full name: Patrick Hervé Suffo-Kengné
- Date of birth: 17 January 1978 (age 48)
- Place of birth: Ebolowa, Cameroon
- Height: 1.83 m (6 ft 0 in)
- Position: Striker

Youth career
- 1995: Tonnerre Yaoundé
- 1995–1996: Nantes

Senior career*
Years	Team	Apps	(Gls)
1996–1997	→ Barcelona B (loan)	26	(4)
1997–2000	Nantes	30	(4)
2000–2002	Sheffield United	36	(5)
2002–2003	→ Numancia (loan)	23	(6)
2003	Al-Hilal	10	(12)
2003–2005	Coventry City	48	(10)
2005	Dubai Club	15	(13)
2005	Odd Grenland	11	(4)
2006–2007	Maccabi Petah Tikva	37	(7)
2007	Ashdod	1	(1)
2008	Puertollano	11	(0)
2008–2009	Wrexham	12	(2)
2011–2012	Bedworth Liberal		
2012–2013	Alvis		
2014–2016	Coventry United	13	(4)

International career
2000–2003	Cameroon	29	(4)
Medal record
Men's football
Representing Cameroon
Africa Cup of Nations
Winner	2002 Mali
Olympics
Gold medal – first place	2000 Sydney
- * Club domestic league appearances and goals

Patrick Hervé Suffo Kengné (born 17 January 1978) is a Cameroonian former professional footballer who played as a striker.

== Club career ==
Suffo was born in Ebolowa, Cameroon. He played in France, England, Spain and the United Arab Emirates before joining Norwegian team Odd Grenland in 2005. His form immediately helped Odd Grenland climb away from the relegation zone. In October of that year he was supposed to sign a contract with rivals, Vålerenga, but he did not. During February 2006 he signed a short-term contract with Israeli team Maccabi Petah Tikva but was subsequently released at the end of this period.

His career was littered with disciplinary problems; whilst at French club Nantes he was banned from playing for eight months for lashing out at a referee.

At Sheffield United Suffo was part in a 21-man mass brawl during the First Division game dubbed as the Battle of Bramall Lane against West Bromwich Albion on 16 March 2002. This game had to be abandoned as Sheffield United were reduced to six players due to three red cards and two injuries. Suffo was one of the three who were sent off as he clashed heads with one of the opposition players. Afterwards, he was told that he had no future with the club and in April Suffo was sent to Spanish Second Division side Numancia on loan for the remainder of the season. In May he received a £3,000 fine and was banned for three games in addition to a three-match suspension already served for his dismissal.

In September 2007, he trialled with Scottish side Dundee United.

On 22 July 2008, Suffo featured in a pre-season friendly for League One side Walsall against Aston Villa. He scored in this game to add to the two goals he notched the previous week in a game against Worcester City.

In November 2008, Suffo signed a "pay as you play" deal with Wrexham, making his debut as a substitute during a 1–0 defeat to Kidderminster Harriers. His first goal for the club came in his second appearance when he converted a penalty during a 2–1 win over Kettering Town.

Suffo signed for Coventry United of the Midland Football League Division Two in August 2014. He made his debut playing the full 90 minutes against Paget Rangers in a 3–2 Coventry United win on 16 August 2014. He has since become a player/assistant manager for the club after the departure of Shamir Alam.

== International career ==
Suffo played at international level for the Cameroon national team, won the gold medal for football at the 2000 Olympic Games in Sydney, Australia and played in the 2002 FIFA World Cup in South Korea and Japan, where he was sent off in the final group game against Germany. He was also part of the Cameroon team who won the 2002 African Cup of Nations, scoring a penalty during the shootout in the final as they beat Senegal.

== Personal life ==
Suffo holds Cameroonian and French nationalities. He acquired French nationality by naturalization on 28 April 1998.

== Career statistics ==
=== International ===
Scores and results list Cameroon's goal tally first, score column indicates score after each Suffo goal.

List of international goals scored by Patrick Suffo
No.	Date	Venue	Opponent	Score	Result	Competition	Ref.
1	9 August 1997	El Menzah Stadium, Tunis, Tunisia	Zambia	1–1	3–3	Friendly	
2	11 April 1999	Estádio da Machava, Matola, Mozambique	Mozambique	6–1	6–1	2000 African Cup of Nations qualification	
3	11 January 2002	El Menzah Stadium, Tunis, Tunisia	Tunisia	1–0	1–0	Friendly	
4	27 March 2002	Charmilles Stadium, Geneva, Switzerland	Argentina	2–2	2–2	Friendly	

== Honours ==
Nantes

- Coupe de France: 1998–99
- Trophée des Champions: 1999

Cameroon U23

- Olympic Gold Medal: 2000

Cameroon

- African Cup of Nations: 2002
