= Mark Ward (footballer, born 1982) =

English footballer

Mark Steven Ward (born 27 January 1982) is an English former footballer who played as a forward for Sheffield United.

== Playing career ==
Ward began his career with Sheffield United, where he made two appearances in the Football League Championship before being released. He went on to play for non-League teams Worksop Town, Hucknall Town, Frickley Athletic, Stocksbridge Park Steels and Belper Town.
