= Phil Jagielka =

English footballer (born 1982)

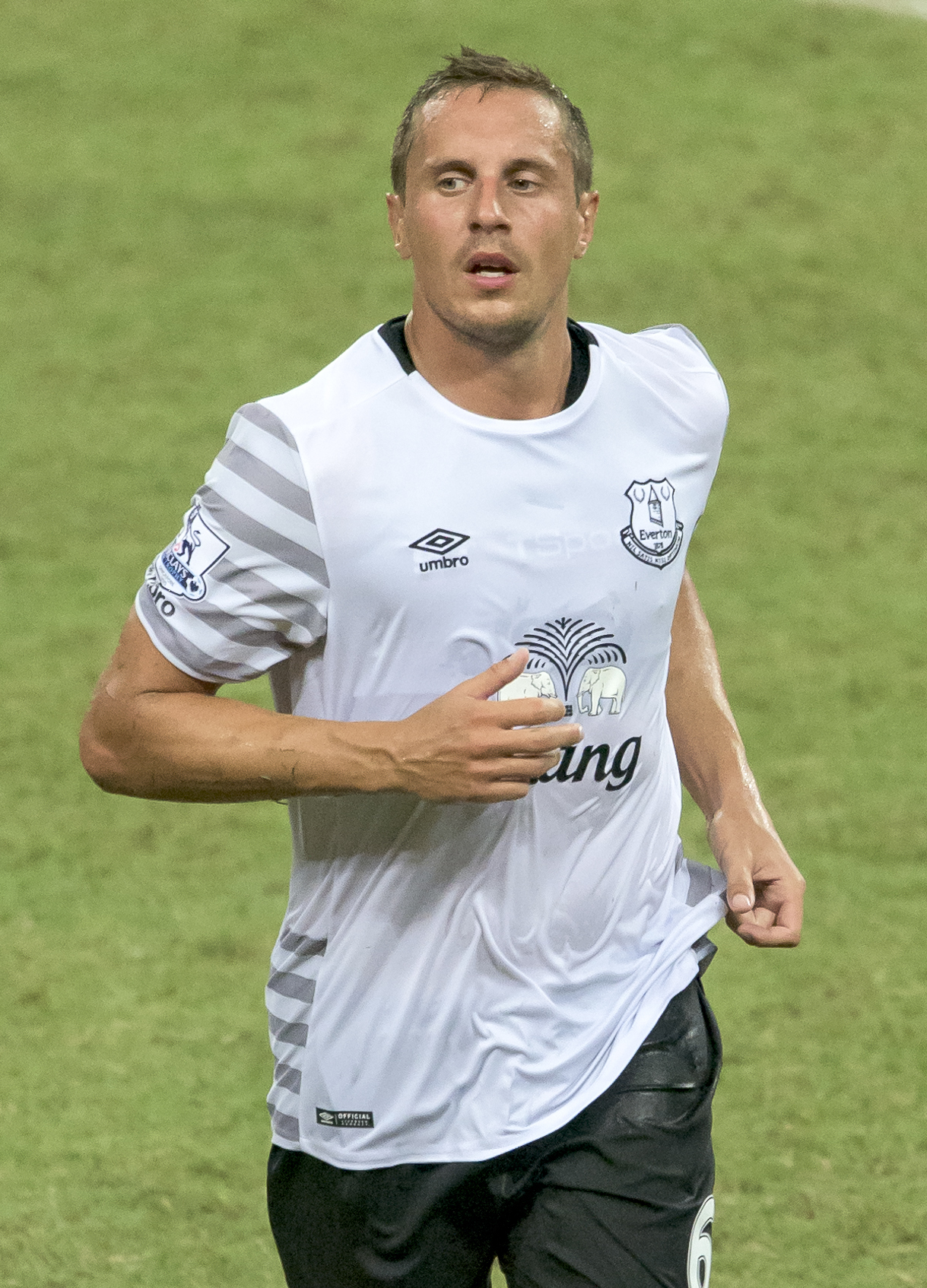
- Jagielka playing for Everton in 2015

Personal information
- Full name: Philip Nikodem Jagielka
- Date of birth: 17 August 1982 (age 44)
- Place of birth: Sale, Greater Manchester, England
- Height: 5 ft 11 in (1.80 m)
- Position: Centre-back

Youth career
- ?–1998: Everton
- 1998–2000: Sheffield United

Senior career*
Years	Team	Apps	(Gls)
2000–2007	Sheffield United	254	(18)
2007–2019	Everton	322	(14)
2019–2021	Sheffield United	16	(0)
2021–2022	Derby County	20	(0)
2022–2023	Stoke City	47	(2)
Total		659	(34)

International career
2002–2003	England U21	6	(2)
2007	England B	1	(0)
2008–2016	England	40	(3)
- * Club domestic league appearances and goals

Philip Nikodem Jagielka (/jəˈɡjɛlkə/ yə-GYEL-kə or /ˌdʒæɡiˈɛlkə/ JAG-ee-EL-kə;,; born 17 August 1982) is an English former professional footballer who played as a centre-back. He is primarily known for his lengthy tenures at Sheffield United and Everton.

Jagielka came up through the youth ranks at Sheffield United from 1998 to 2000, where he made his first-team debut in the latter year. He helped them achieve top-flight status for the 2006–07 season. When Sheffield United were relegated, Jagielka joined Everton for a £4 million fee in 2007. He later captained the club from 2013 to 2019, and totalled 385 games. He left Everton in July 2019 after 12 years and returned to former club Sheffield United. He had brief stints at Championship clubs Derby County and Stoke City before retiring in 2023 at the age of 41.

Debuting in 2008, Jagielka received 40 England caps during his international career and was included in the England squads at UEFA Euro 2012 and the 2014 FIFA World Cup.

== Early life ==
Jagielka was born in Sale, Greater Manchester, and attended Knutsford Academy. He played for Holy Family Football Club, a Sunday team affiliated with, although not directly linked to, the school of the same name, from the ages of eight to 11. He played as a right winger, as he possessed great pace, and played in matches against boys of the school year older than him. He first impressed youth scouts whilst playing for his local team Hale Barns United in Altrincham. He predominantly played midfield during his time with the club and also played for his school team, Moorlands Junior School.

He was at the academy of Everton as a youngster and spent time training with clubs such as Stoke City and Manchester City, before joining Sheffield United in 1998 at 15 years of age.

== Club career ==
=== Sheffield United ===
Jagielka made his way through the youth ranks at Sheffield United before making his first-team debut on 5 May 2000 against Swindon Town in the final First Division match of the 1999–2000 season, whilst still a trainee. He was rewarded with a professional contract the following day and having progressed well at the start of the following season, he signed a three-year deal with the club in January 2001.

He established himself in the Sheffield United first-team in the 2002–03 season and started to attract the attention of other clubs, including Leeds United, who were linked with a £6 million joint bid for Jagielka and United teammate Michael Brown, but Sheffield United said they would resist any attempts to sign the players.

Jagielka stated in April 2005 he was happy to stay at United, despite several Premier League clubs being interested in signing him. United manager Neil Warnock told West Ham United in June 2005 that Jagielka would not be sold, and in July Wigan Athletic made a £4 million bid for Jagielka, after which United upped their valuation of him. By November, Jagielka had been linked with a £4 million move to Bolton Wanderers, but United manager Neil Warnock said there had been no contact from Bolton.

Jagielka signed a new three-year deal with United in August 2006. He played as team captain in Chris Morgan's absence. Jagielka gave United their first Premier League victory since April 1994 when he hit a 91st minute half-volley against Middlesbrough for a 2–1 win in September 2006. Despite being recognised as one of United's key players, chairman Kevin McCabe admitted that Jagielka could be sold if the price was high enough. In a home match against Arsenal on 30 December 2006, due to a thigh injury to starting goalkeeper Paddy Kenny and with his team 1–0 up, Jagielka was forced to play in goal for the remainder of the match. Arsenal were kept at bay for the remaining 34 minutes and Jagielka's late save from Robin van Persie secured the 1–0 victory. Warnock wrote in The Independent that "He's a very competent keeper, but he's the sort of bloke who'd be world class at tiddlywinks", and that he preferred to put Jagielka in goal rather than use a substitution that could be used for an attacking change instead.

By the end of the 2006–07 season, he had made 133 consecutive league appearances for United, including every league match in the 2004–05 and 2005–06 seasons and every minute of the 2006–07 season. When Sheffield United were relegated from the Premier League at the end of the 2006–07 season, Jagielka was linked with moves away from United and goalkeeper Paddy Kenny said he believed it was time Jagielka moved on. New United boss Bryan Robson urged Jagielka to wait for the outcome of the club's relegation arbitration hearing before deciding to leave the club.

=== Everton ===
==== 2007–2012 ====
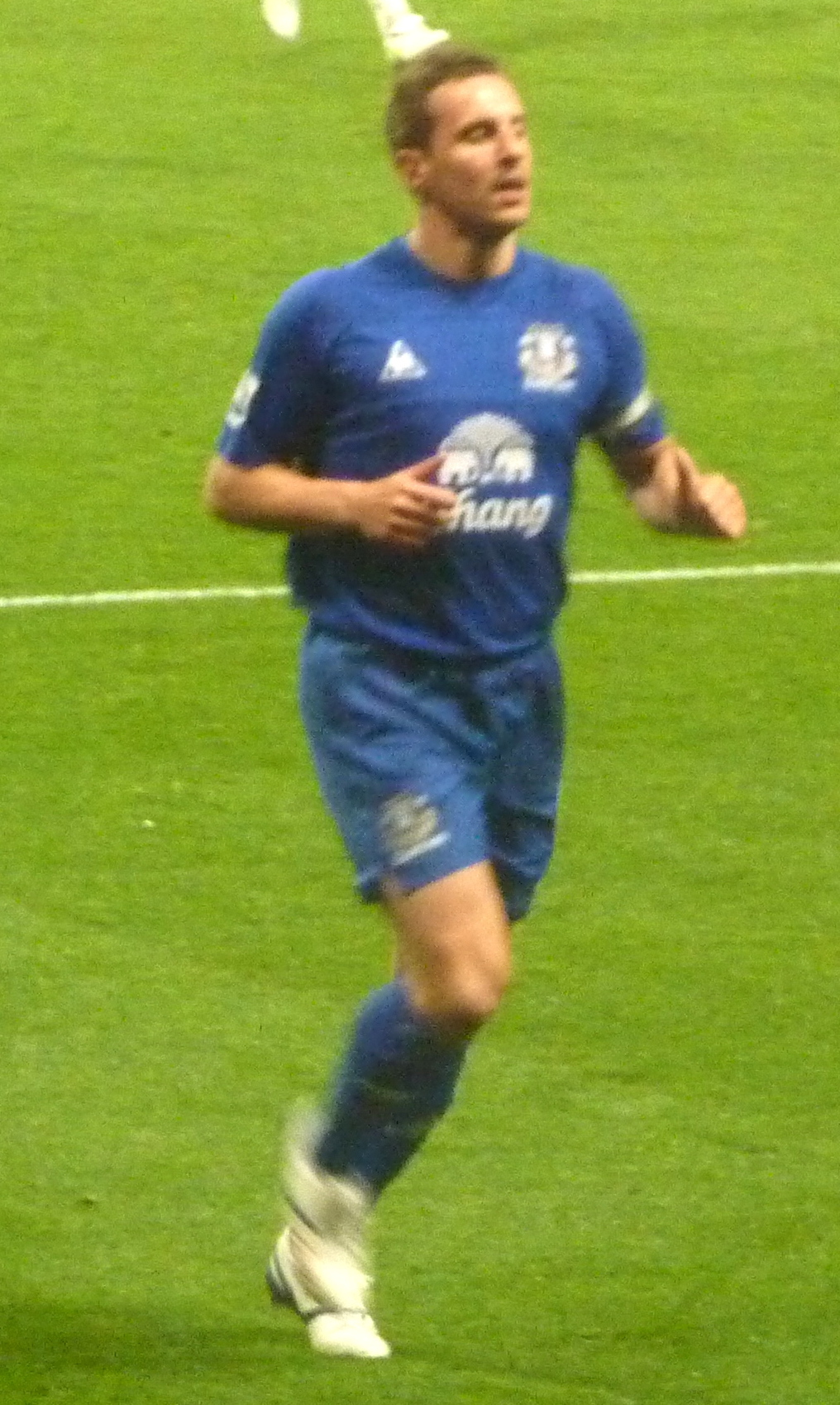
Jagielka playing for Everton in 2011

Jagielka eventually signed for Everton on 4 July 2007, in a deal worth £4 million on a five-year contract, the highest amount paid for a Sheffield United player at the time. He made his home debut at Goodison Park on 31 July 2007 as a second-half substitute in a pre-season friendly against Werder Bremen, replacing Joseph Yobo in central defence. After a slow start to his Everton career, Jagielka developed into an important member of the first team. He scored his first Everton goal in the UEFA Cup against AZ. He scored an own goal against Wigan Athletic, although Everton won 2–1. He put in a succession of man of the match performances in the following matches, against Tottenham Hotspur, Brann and Manchester City. He scored his first league goal for Everton against Reading on 9 February 2008.

Jagielka started the 2008–09 season as first-choice centre-back, playing every minute of every league match until being injured in a 2–1 home defeat to Manchester City. He was named the Premier League Player of the Month for February and won Everton's fans and club player of the season. Jagielka scored the winning penalty for Everton in a penalty shoot-out in the semi-final of the FA Cup against Manchester United, but he was claimed to have fouled Danny Welbeck after 68 minutes, with many claiming it to be a penalty, which the referee did not award. Soon afterwards he ruptured his anterior cruciate ligament playing against Manchester City, and as a consequence missed the 2009 FA Cup final, which Everton lost to Chelsea.

After missing the end of the 2008–09 season and more than half of 2009–10, Jagielka played his first senior fixture since the cruciate ligament injury in an away match against Sporting CP in the UEFA Europa League in February 2010, coming on as a substitute for an injured Philippe Senderos.

==== 2013–2019 ====
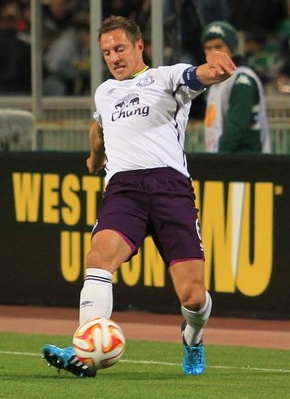
Jagielka playing for Everton in 2014

On 3 January 2013, Jagielka signed a new contract at Everton, keeping him at Goodison Park until 2017. In April 2013, manager David Moyes announced that Jagielka would be appointed as the club captain for the 2013–14 season after the retirement of Phil Neville.

When Moyes left for Manchester United, new manager Roberto Martínez stated that Jagielka would make a "phenomenal captain". In Jagielka's first season as captain, Everton amassed a Premier League club record 72 points to finish fifth.

On 27 September 2014, Jagielka scored his first goal in two seasons with a 30-yard half volley against Liverpool in the Merseyside derby to level the match in the 91st minute. On 6 November 2014, Jagielka scored his first European goal in seven years in Everton's 3–0 UEFA Europa League group stage win against Lille. That season saw Jagielka awarded with three accolades at the club: Player of the Season, Players' Player of the Season and Goal of the Season.

Jagielka reclaimed his place as Everton's starting centre-back in March 2017 after Ramiro Funes Mori suffered a knee injury on international duty. In April 2017, Jagielka scored in three successive league matches for Everton: first, in a 1–1 draw against Manchester United at Old Trafford on 4 April – his first league goal in two years – then in a 4–2 victory against Leicester City at Goodison Park on 9 April, and finally, in a 3–1 home victory over Burnley on 15 April.

Jagielka extended his contract with Everton for another year until July 2019 on 2 August 2017.

After finding himself on the periphery of the Everton first team for most of the 2018–19 season, an illness to Michael Keane in the warm-up before a match against Arsenal on 7 April 2019 saw Jagielka replace him in the starting line-up. Jagielka went on to score the only goal in the 10th minute which was his first Everton goal for two years. In doing so, and at the age of 36 years and 233 days, he became the second-oldest player to score for Everton in the Premier League era, behind Richard Gough.

=== Return to Sheffield United ===
Jagielka left Everton at the end of the 2018–19 season, having made 385 appearances in 12 years. He returned to Sheffield United on 4 July 2019 on a one-year contract, following the club's promotion to the Premier League. On 23 August 2020 he signed a new one-year deal to keep him at the club for the 2020–21 season.

=== Derby County ===
Following his eventual release from Sheffield United, Jagielka signed for Championship club Derby County on 17 August 2021 on a short-term contract until January 2022, having trained with the club throughout pre-season. He made his debut the next day in a 1–0 win away to Hull City, his first Championship match since April 2006. On 14 January 2022, Jagielka departed the club. Manager Wayne Rooney wanted to extend Jagielka's contract with the club however due to an embargo placed on the club until Derby's administrators provided proof of funds, Rooney was unable to do so.

=== Stoke City ===
On 15 January 2022, Jagielka signed for Championship club Stoke City until the end of the 2021–22 season. He made 20 appearances, as Stoke ended the season in 14th position. Jagielka signed a new six-month contract extension with Stoke on 6 May 2022. He scored against his former club Sheffield United on 8 October 2022. Jagielka reached 800 senior career appearances in April 2023. Jagielka played 30 times in the 2022–23 season and he was released at the end of the season.

On 28 November 2023, Jagielka announced his decision to retire from professional football, aged 41.

== International career ==
Jagielka is a former member of the England under-21 team, and scored in a 2–0 victory over Slovakia at the Stadium of Light in June 2003.

On 10 May 2007, Jagielka was named in the England B team for the first time, for their match against Albania. Starting on the bench, he replaced Phil Neville at right back at the beginning of the second half. On 11 May 2008, Jagielka was named in the senior England squad for the first time for the friendlies with United States and Trinidad and Tobago. He subsequently expressed his delight at the call up and publicly thanked everyone at Everton for their help. On 1 June 2008, Jagielka got his first international cap for the senior team against Trinidad and Tobago, playing the second half of a match in which England used two different sides for each half.

Jagielka was once again named in the England squad for the friendly match against European champions Spain, 11 February 2009, and subsequently played for the first 45 minutes, after an impressive string of performances at club level publicly praised by manager David Moyes after the FA Cup fourth round replay tie between Everton and Liverpool. Jagielka received his fourth cap when he played in England's first post 2010 FIFA World Cup friendly against Hungary on 11 August 2010 at Wembley Stadium where he scored an own goal to put the visitors ahead in a 2–1 England win.

On 3 September 2010, Jagielka made his first competitive start, and played for the entirety of the match in a 4–0 win over Bulgaria. He was said to have "read the game brilliantly on a night when he proved his credentials". He was called up to the England squad once again for the UEFA Euro 2012 qualifier against Montenegro at Wembley Stadium on 12 October.

Jagielka was originally placed on the standby list for England's UEFA Euro 2012 squad, and played the full match in a pre-tournament warm-up match against Norway, which England won 1–0. On 28 May 2012, he was added to the main squad after Gareth Barry was ruled out of the tournament with an abdominal injury. He did not, however, feature in any of England's four matches during the tournament.

In August 2012, Jagielka scored his first goal for England, a diving header during a 2–1 friendly victory over Italy in Bern, Switzerland.

On 12 May 2014, Jagielka was named in England's squad for the 2014 FIFA World Cup. He scored his second England goal on 30 May 2014 to wrap up a 3–0 friendly win over Peru at Wembley, reacting after goalkeeper Raúl Fernández dropped a corner from Jagielka's Everton teammate Leighton Baines. England were unbeaten in 11 competitive matches in which Jagielka has played in (won eight and drawn three), until they lost 2–1 to Italy in their opening match of the World Cup.

Jagielka scored his third England goal, and first in a competitive fixture, on 9 October 2014; his header opened a 5–0 Wembley win over San Marino in UEFA Euro 2016 qualifying. Jagielka became the first Everton player to captain England when they played against Lithuania on 12 October 2015 in a UEFA Euro qualifying match.

On 15 November 2016, he became the most-capped Everton player from England when he came on as a second-half substitute against Spain in a 2–2 draw.

== Personal life ==
Jagielka is of Polish and Scottish descent. His brother, Steve, who died in 2021, was also a professional midfielder, mainly for Shrewsbury Town. Although he was loaned to Sheffield United for one season, the pair never featured together in a competitive fixture. Phil's son, Zac, plays for Hull City U18s and Wales U17s.

In September 2009, Jagielka's home in Knutsford was targeted by armed robbers who held Jagielka at knifepoint while they burgled him.

== Career statistics ==
=== Club ===
Appearances and goals by club, season and competition
Club	Season	League			FA Cup		League Cup		Other		Total	
Club	Season	Division	Apps	Goals	Apps	Goals	Apps	Goals	Apps	Goals	Apps	Goals
Sheffield United	1999–2000	First Division	1	0	0	0	0	0	—		1	0
Sheffield United	2000–01	First Division	15	0	0	0	3	0	—		18	0
Sheffield United	2001–02	First Division	23	3	0	0	1	0	—		24	3
Sheffield United	2002–03	First Division	42	0	5	1	7	1	3 (Note: Appearances in First Division play-offs)	0	57	2
Sheffield United	2003–04	First Division	43	3	3	0	2	0	—		48	3
Sheffield United	2004–05	Championship	46	0	5	1	3	1	—		54	2
Sheffield United	2005–06	Championship	46	8	1	0	0	0	—		47	8
Sheffield United	2006–07	Premier League	38	4	0	0	0	0	—		38	4
Sheffield United	Total		254	18	14	2	16	2	3	0	287	22
Everton	2007–08	Premier League	34	1	1	0	5	0	9 (Note: Appearances in UEFA Cup)	1	49	2
Everton	2008–09	Premier League	34	0	6	0	1	0	2	1	43	1
Everton	2009–10	Premier League	12	0	0	0	0	0	1 (Note: Appearance(s) in UEFA Europa League)	0	13	0
Everton	2010–11	Premier League	33	1	2	0	1	0	—		36	1
Everton	2011–12	Premier League	30	2	1	0	2	0	—		33	2
Everton	2012–13	Premier League	36	2	4	1	1	0	—		41	3
Everton	2013–14	Premier League	26	0	2	0	2	0	—		30	0
Everton	2014–15	Premier League	37	4	2	0	0	0	9	2	48	6
Everton	2015–16	Premier League	21	0	5	0	3	0	—		29	0
Everton	2016–17	Premier League	27	3	0	0	0	0	—		27	3
Everton	2017–18	Premier League	25	0	1	0	1	0	2	0	29	0
Everton	2018–19	Premier League	7	1	0	0	0	0	—		7	1
Everton	Total		322	14	24	1	16	0	23	4	385	19
Sheffield United	2019–20	Premier League	6	0	2	0	2	0	—		10	0
Sheffield United	2020–21	Premier League	10	0	1	0	1	0	—		12	0
Sheffield United	Total		16	0	3	0	3	0	0	0	22	0
Derby County	2021–22	Championship	20	0	1	0	0	0	—		21	0
Stoke City	2021–22	Championship	20	0	—		—		—		20	0
Stoke City	2022–23	Championship	27	2	2	0	1	0	—		30	2
Stoke City	Total		47	2	2	0	1	0	—		50	2
Career total			659	34	44	3	36	2	26	4	765	43

=== International ===
Appearances and goals by national team and year
National team	Year	Apps	Goals
England	2008	1	0
England	2009	2	0
England	2010	4	0
England	2011	3	0
England	2012	6	1
England	2013	8	0
England	2014	10	2
England	2015	4	0
England	2016	2	0
Total		40	3

England score listed first, score column indicates score after each Jagielka goal

List of international goals scored by Phil Jagielka
No.	Date	Venue	Cap	Opponent	Score	Result	Competition	Ref.
1	15 August 2012	Stade de Suisse, Bern, Switzerland	13	Italy	1–1	2–1	Friendly	
2	30 May 2014	Wembley Stadium, London, England	25	Peru	3–0	3–0	Friendly	
3	9 October 2014	Wembley Stadium, London, England	31	San Marino	1–0	5–0	UEFA Euro 2016 qualifying	

== Honours ==
Everton

- FA Cup runner-up: 2008–09

Individual

- Football League Championship Player of the Year: 2005–06
- Premier League Player of the Month: February 2009
- PFA Team of the Year: 2003–04 First Division, 2005–06 Championship
- Sheffield United Player of the Year: 2004–05, 2005–06, 2006–07
- Everton Player of the Season: 2008–09, 2014–15
- Everton Players' Player of the Season: 2008–09, 2014–15
- Everton Goal of the Season: 2014–15
