= Davy Gysbrechts =

Belgian footballer

Personal information
- Date of birth: 20 September 1972 (age 53)
- Place of birth: Belgium
- Position: Sweeper

Senior career*
Years	Team	Apps	(Gls)
1990-1997	KV Mechelen		
1997-1999	K.S.C. Lokeren Oost-Vlaanderen		
1999-2002	Sheffield United	17	(0)
- * Club domestic league appearances and goals

Davy Gysbrechts (alternatively spelled Davy Gjisbrechts; born 20 September 1972) is a Belgian retired footballer who played as a sweeper.

== Career ==
Gysbrechts started his career with KV Mechelen.

Gysbrechts retired after playing 19 games for Sheffield United between 1999 and 2002. He was linked with a move back to Mechelen which never materialised.

Gysbrechts now works in the 'Green Service' in his home country.
