= Bobby Ford =

English footballer

Personal information
- Full name: Robert Ford
- Date of birth: 22 September 1974 (age 52)
- Place of birth: Bristol, England
- Height: 5 ft 8 in (1.73 m)
- Position: Midfielder

Senior career*
Years	Team	Apps	(Gls)
1992–1997	Oxford United	116	(7)
1997–2002	Sheffield United	154	(6)
2002–2003	Oxford United	37	(1)
2004–2005	Bath City	60	(1)
- * Club domestic league appearances and goals

Robert Ford (born 22 September 1974) is an English former professional footballer who played for Oxford United and Sheffield United.

== Biography ==
Born in Bristol, Ford began his career as a trainee at Oxford, signing a professional contract in 1992. In November 1997, Sheffield United bought him for £400,000. In 2002, he returned to Oxford on a free transfer, scoring once in his second spell at the club against Boston United, before retiring from professional football in July 2003. After a break from football, in January 2004 he signed for Bath City, where he spent almost two years, before retiring permanently.
