= Wilko de Vogt =

Dutch footballer

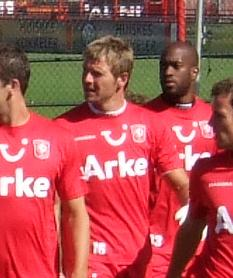

Personal information
- Full name: Wilko de Vogt
- Date of birth: 17 September 1975 (age 51)
- Place of birth: Breda, Netherlands
- Height: 1.87 m (6 ft 1 1/2 in)
- Position: Goalkeeper

Youth career
- TVC'39 Breda
- NAC Breda

Senior career*
Years	Team	Apps	(Gls)
1996–2001	NAC Breda	15	(0)
2001–2003	Sheffield United	6	(0)
2003	RBC Roosendaal	2	(0)
2003–2005	RKC Waalwijk	1	(0)
2004–2005	→ Oss (loan)	30	(0)
2005–2010	Oss	209	(0)
2010–2011	Twente	0	(0)
2011–2012	VVV-Venlo	10	(0)
2012–2013	NAC Breda	0	(0)
- * Club domestic league appearances and goals as of 7 June 2012 (UTC)

Wilko de Vogt (born 17 September 1975 in Breda, North Brabant) is a former Dutch football goalkeeper.

De Vogt started his professional career in 1996 with NAC Breda after he had come through their youth system. In 2001, he was transferred to Sheffield United. However, after only six appearances for the club in two years, he returned to the Netherlands when he was sold to RBC Roosendaal. He has since played for RKC Waalwijk and over 200 matches for FC Oss. In 2010, he joined FC Twente as their third choice goalkeeper. He has played this role for VVV-Venlo and NAC Breda, before ending his career in July 2013.
