= Jean-Philippe Javary =

French footballer (born 1978)

Personal information
- Full name: Jean-Philippe Javary
- Date of birth: 10 January 1978 (age 48)
- Place of birth: Montpellier, France
- Height: 5 ft 10 in (1.78 m)
- Position: Midfielder

Youth career
- Montpellier

Senior career*
Years	Team	Apps	(Gls)
1995–1998	Montpellier	9	(0)
1998–2000	Espanyol		
1999–2000	→ Valence (loan)	4	(0)
2000	Raith Rovers	12	(0)
2000–2001	Brentford	6	(0)
2001	Plymouth Argyle	4	(0)
2001	Partick Thistle	1	(0)
2001–2002	Raith Rovers	7	(0)
2002–2003	Sheffield United	13	(1)
2003	→ Walsall (loan)	0	(0)
- Excelsior
2005	Hamilton Academical	13	(1)
- Excelsior
- Avirons
- * Club domestic league appearances and goals

Jean-Philippe Javary (born 10 January 1978) is a retired French professional footballer. He played in his homeland, where he started at hometown team Montpellier, as well as numerous clubs in England and Scotland. He was a midfielder.

== Career ==
=== Club career ===
Born in Montpellier, France, Javary started his career with his hometown club Montpellier HSC as a junior, where he played nine Ligue 1 games during the 1995–96 and 1996–97 seasons. He was offered a five-year contract at Spanish La Liga side FC Barcelona, although the offer was later withdrawn, and instead joined another Spanish Barcelona-based club RCD Espanyol in June 1998. He returned to France for a period on loan with Ligue 2 club ASOA Valence in the 1999–2000 season, where he played four games.

In January 2000, he joined Scottish Division One side Raith Rovers. He played 11 games with Raith during the latter half of the 2000–01 season. After one more game at the start of the following season, he was signed in August by English Division Two side Brentford for £150,000 by manager–chairman Ron Noades. He played only six games with Brentford, and another four with Plymouth Argyle in English Division Three at the end of the same season.

Javary moved back to Scotland and played a game on trial with Division One side Partick Thistle in October 2001, before he returned to Raith Rovers the following month. He played another seven games with Raith, before he moved back to England, with Sheffield United in Division One on non-contract terms in March 2002, and was given a two-year contract by manager Neil Warnock the following month. He was given a one-month loan spell at Walsall in January 2003, but was suffering from tonsilitis and never played a game. In July 2003, Javary was one of four senior players to be told he could leave the club by Neil Warnock, before he was released from his contract in September 2003; Javary decided to return to France. He played 14 games with Sheffield United, all but one in the league, and scored one goal against Watford.

After a spell with AS Excelsior in the French Réunion Islands, he returned to Scotland in January 2005 with Hamilton Academical again in Division One. He was released by Hamilton during the 2005 summer, after he had played 13 league matches, during which time he scored one goal against Falkirk. After his release he moved back to Réunion, again with Excelsior, and later moved on to FC Avirons.

In 2008, Javary moved to Australia to find an A-League team to continue his career.

=== International career ===
Javary has also played for the French national sides from under 16 to under 19 level. He captained his country's European Youth Championship side in 1995.
