= Shaun Murphy (soccer) =

Australian soccer player

Personal information
- Full name: Shaun Peter Murphy
- Date of birth: 5 November 1970 (age 55)
- Place of birth: Sydney, Australia
- Height: 1.85 m (6 ft 1 in)
- Position: Centre back

Youth career
- 1988: Australian Institute of Sport
- Blacktown City Demons
- Heidelberg United

Senior career*
Years	Team	Apps	(Gls)
1990–1991	Perth Italia		
1992–1997	Notts County	109	(5)
1996–1999	West Bromwich Albion	71	(7)
1999	Sorrento		
1999–2003	Sheffield United	158	(9)
2001–2002	→ Crystal Palace (loan)	11	(0)
2003–2004	Perth Glory	28	(4)

International career^{‡}
1989	Australia U-20		
1992	Australia U-23		
2000–2001	Australia	18	(3)
Medal record
Men's football
Representing Australia
OFC Nations Cup
Winner	2000 Tahiti
FIFA Confederations Cup
Third place	2001 Korea/Japan
- * Club domestic league appearances and goals as of 26 July 2007 ‡ National team caps and goals as of 26 July 2007

Shaun Peter Murphy (born 5 November 1970) is an Australian former soccer player. His club career included stints with Notts County (1992–1997), West Bromwich Albion (1997–1999), Sheffield United (1999–2003) and Crystal Palace (2001–02) in England, before returning to Australia for one season to captain Perth Glory (2003–04).

He was a member of the Australian national team and scored a winner against Brazil for Australia in the 2001 Confederations Cup third place play-off match. He also represented Australia at the 1992 Summer Olympics.

== International career ==
=== International goals ===
Scores and results list Australia's goal tally first.

No	Date	Venue	Opponent	Score	Result	Competition
1.	28 June 2000	Stade Pater Te Hono Nui, Papeete, Tahiti	New Zealand	1–0	2–0	2000 OFC Nations Cup
2.	30 May 2001	Suwon World Cup Stadium, Suwon, South Korea	Mexico	1–0	2–0	2001 FIFA Confederations Cup
3.	9 June 2001	Ulsan Munsu Football Stadium, Ulsan, Japan	Brazil	1–0	1–0	2001 FIFA Confederations Cup

== Honours ==
Australia

- FIFA Confederations Cup: 3rd place, 2001
- OFC Nations Cup: 2000
