= Colin Cryan =

Irish former professional footballer

Personal information
- Date of birth: 23 March 1981 (age 45)
- Place of birth: Celbridge, Kildare, Ireland
- Position: Defender

Senior career*
Years	Team	Apps	(Gls)
1998–2004	Sheffield United	10	(0)
2002	→ Scarborough (loan)	2	(2)
2003–2004	→ Scarborough (loan)	10	(1)
2004–2005	Scarborough	46	(4)
2005–2007	Lincoln City	41	(0)
2005–2007	Boston United	15	(0)
2007–2011	Droylsden	110	(8)

International career
2003	Republic of Ireland U21	5	(2)
- * Club domestic league appearances and goals

Colin Cryan (born 23 March 1981) is an Irish former professional footballer. Spent 6 years at the blades and Reserve team captain for final two seasons. Loan Spells at Scarborough. Signed for Lincoln City and completed degree at Sheffield Hallam whilst playing with the Imps. Signed for Boston United in League 2 and finished career with Droylsden. Under 21 Republic of Ireland appearances under Don Given.

== Career ==
He played as a defender for Sheffield United, Scarborough, Lincoln City, Boston United and Droylsden.
