= 1994–95 Sheffield United F.C. season =

Sheffield United
1994–95 season
- Chairman: Reg Brealey
- Manager: Dave Bassett
- Stadium: Bramall Lane
- Division One: 8th
- FA Cup: Third round
- League Cup: Third round
- Top goalscorer: League: Blake (17); All: Blake (18)
- Highest home attendance: 22,322 (vs. Manchester United)
- Lowest home attendance: 5,065 (vs. Stockport County)

The 1994–95 season was the 106th season in existence for Sheffield United, during which they played in Division One under manager Dave Bassett, having been relegated from the Premier League the previous season. With various factions attempting to take over the club, little money was invested in the side and they were unable to make an immediate return to the Premier League, finishing 8th.

== Ground ==
Bramall Lane operated with only three sides during the season as the old John Street Stand had been demolished.

== Season overview ==
Following relegation from the Premier League, the season before the club had little funds to try to mount a sustained promotion push. During the summer, Carl Bradshaw had been sold to Norwich City for £500,000 and Tom Cowan to Huddersfield Town for a further £200,000. They were replaced by two cut-priced Australians, Doug Hodgson and Carl Veart, who cost £30,000 and £150,000 respectively.

== Players ==
=== First-team squad ===
Note: Flags indicate national team as defined under FIFA eligibility rules; some limited exceptions apply. Players may hold more than one non-FIFA nationality.

No.	Pos.	Nation	Player
—	DF	ENG	Graham Anthony
—	DF	ENG	Paul Beesley
—	MF	NIR	Kingsley Black (on loan from Nottingham Forest)
—	FW	WAL	Nathan Blake
—	DF	ENG	Mark Blount
—	DF	ENG	Ross Davidson
—	MF	ENG	Bobby Davison
—	MF	ENG	Ashley Fickling
—	FW	NOR	Jostein Flo
—	DF	ENG	Mark Foran
—	MF	ENG	Kevin Gage
—	MF	ENG	John Gannon
—	DF	ENG	Brian Gayle (captain)
—	MF	ENG	Charlie Hartfield
—	MF	WAL	Glyn Hodges
—	DF	AUS	Doug Hodgson

No.	Pos.	Nation	Player
—	MF	ENG	Jamie Hoyland
—	GK	IRL	Alan Kelly
—	MF	ENG	Adrian Littlejohn
—	DF	SCO	Scott Marshall (on loan from Arsenal)
—	GK	ENG	Billy Mercer
—	DF	NOR	Roger Nilsen
—	MF	ENG	John Reed
—	MF	ENG	Paul Rogers
—	FW	ENG	Andy Scott
—	DF	ENG	Rob Scott
—	FW	ENG	Phil Starbuck
—	GK	ENG	Simon Tracey
—	DF	ENG	David Tuttle
—	FW	AUS	Carl Veart
—	MF	ENG	Mitch Ward
—	MF	ENG	Dane Whitehouse

=== Squad statistics ===
As of the end of the season

No.	Pos	Nat	Player	Total		Division One		FA Cup		League Cup	
No.	Pos	Nat	Player	Apps	Goals	Apps	Goals	Apps	Goals	Apps	Goals
	DF	(England) ENG	Graham Anthony	1	0	1	0	0	0	0	0
	DF	(England) ENG	Paul Beesley	28	2	27	2	0	0	1	0
	MF	(Northern Ireland) NIR	Kingsley Black	11	2	11	2	0	0	0	0
	FW	(Wales) WAL	Nathan Blake	39	18	35	17	1	0	3	1
	DF	(England) ENG	Mark Blount	5	0	5	0	0	0	0	0
	DF	(England) ENG	Ross Davidson	2	0	1	0	0	0	1	0
	MF	(England) ENG	Bobby Davison	4	1	3	1	0	0	1	0
	MF	(England) ENG	Ashley Fickling	2	0	0	0	0	0	2	0
	FW	(Norway) NOR	Jostein Flo	35	8	32	6	1	0	2	2
	DF	(England) ENG	Mark Foran	5	1	4	1	0	0	1	0
	MF	(England) ENG	Kevin Gage	43	5	40	5	1	0	2	0
	MF	(England) ENG	John Gannon	14	0	12	0	0	0	2	0
	DF	(England) ENG	Brian Gayle	38	1	35	1	1	0	2	0
	MF	(England) ENG	Charlie Hartfield	27	1	25	1	1	0	1	0
	MF	(Wales) WAL	Glyn Hodges	26	4	25	4	1	0	0	0
	DF	(Australia) AUS	Doug Hodgson	2	0	1	0	0	0	1	0
	MF	(England) ENG	Jamie Hoyland	4	0	2	0	0	0	2	0
	GK	(Republic of Ireland) IRL	Alan Kelly	42	0	38	0	1	0	3	0
	MF	(England) ENG	Adrian Littlejohn	18	1	16	1	0	0	2	0
	DF	(Scotland) SCO	Scott Marshall	17	0	17	0	0	0	0	0
	GK	(England) ENG	Billy Mercer	3	0	3	0	0	0	0	0
	DF	(Norway) NOR	Roger Nilsen	35	0	33	0	1	0	1	0
	MF	(England) ENG	John Reed	13	2	12	2	0	0	1	0
	MF	(England) ENG	Paul Rogers	47	4	44	4	1	0	2	0
	FW	(England) ENG	Andy Scott	40	5	37	4	1	0	2	1
	DF	(England) ENG	Rob Scott	2	0	1	0	0	0	1	0
	FW	(England) ENG	Phil Starbuck	24	1	23	1	1	0	0	0
	GK	(England) ENG	Simon Tracey	5	0	5	0	0	0	0	0
	DF	(England) ENG	David Tuttle	6	0	6	0	0	0	0	0
	FW	(Australia) AUS	Carl Veart	41	11	39	11	1	0	1	0
	MF	(England) ENG	Mitch Ward	16	2	14	2	0	0	2	0
	MF	(England) ENG	Dane Whitehouse	43	10	39	7	1	0	3	3

=== Transfers ===
==== In ====
Squad #	Position	Player	Transferred from	Fee	Date	Source
	FW	(Australia) Carl Veart	(Australia) Adelaide City	£150,000	22 July 1994	
	DF	(Australia) Doug Hodgson	(Australia) Heidelberg Alex	£30,000	22 July 1994	
	DF	(England) Mark Foran	(England) Millwall	£25,000	27 August 1994	
	GK	(England) Billy Mercer	(England) Rotherham United	£75,000	12 October 1994	
	FW	(England) Phil Starbuck	(England) Huddersfield Town	£150,000	28 October 1994	

==== Loan in ====
Squad #	Position	Player	Loaned from	Start	End	Source
	DF	(Scotland) Scott Marshall	(England) Arsenal	25 August 1994	22 November 1994	
	MF	(Northern Ireland) Kingsley Black	(England) Nottingham Forest	2 March 1995	9 May 1995	

==== Out ====
Squad #	Position	Player	Transferred to	Fee	Date	Source
	DF	(Sweden) Jonas Wirmola	(Sweden) Malmo	£50,000	31 May 1994	
	MF	(England) Chris Kamara	(England) Bradford City	Free	25 July 1994	
	DF	(England) Carl Bradshaw	(England) Norwich City	£500,000	28 July 1994	
	DF	(Scotland) Tom Cowan	(England) Huddersfield Town	£200,000	13 July 1994	
	FW	(England) Alan Cork	(England) Fulham	Free	1 August 1994	
	FW	(England) Franz Carr	(England) Leicester City	£100,000	11 October 1994	
	FW	(England) Bobby Davison	(England) Rotherham United	Free	14 October 1994	
	MF	(Scotland) Mark Hawthorne	(England) Walsall	Free	23 January 1995	
	MF	(England) Jamie Hoyland	(England) Burnley	£130,000	14 October 1994	
	DF	(England) Ashley Fickling	(England) Grimsby Town	Free	22 March 1995	

==== Loan out ====
Squad #	Position	Player	Loaned to	Start	End	Source
	DF	(England) Mark Foran	(England) Rotherham United	26 August 1994	26 September 1994	
	GK	(England) Sal Bibbo	(England) Chesterfield	10 February 1995	31 May 1995	

== League table ==
Pos	Team	Pld	W	D	L	GF	GA	GD	Pts
6	Barnsley	46	20	12	14	63	52	+11	72
7	Watford	46	19	13	14	52	46	+6	70
8	Sheffield United	46	17	17	12	74	55	+19	68
9	Derby County	46	18	12	16	66	51	+15	66
10	Grimsby Town	46	17	14	15	62	56	+6	65

Rules for classification: 1) Points; 2) Goals scored; 3) Goal difference
