= 1997 Football League First Division play-off final =

Association football match in London

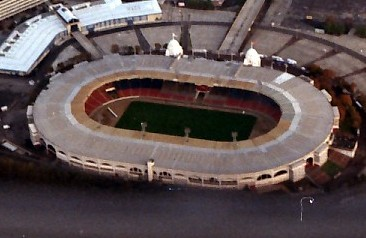
- The match took place at Wembley Stadium.
Crystal Palace	Sheffield United
1	0
- Date: 26 May 1997
- Venue: Wembley Stadium, London
- Referee: Neale Barry
- Attendance: 64,383
- Weather: Sunny, 91 °F (33 °C)

The 1997 Football League First Division play-off final was an association football match played between Crystal Palace and Sheffield United on 26 May 1997 at Wembley Stadium, London, England. The game was to determine the third and final team to gain promotion from the second tier Football League First Division to the Premier League, the highest tier of English league football. The top two teams of the 1996–97 Football League First Division season gained automatic promotion, while clubs placed from third to sixth in the league table competed in play-offs. The winners of the play-off semi-finals played against each other for the final place in the Premier League for the 1997–98 season. Sheffield United ended the season in fifth position, one place ahead of Crystal Palace. Winning the final was estimated to be worth up to £10 million.

The game was played in front of a crowd of 64,383 and refereed by Neale Barry. Crystal Palace played with five midfielders in a 3–5–2 formation while their opponents played 4–4–2. Both goalkeepers were called into action in the first half with Crystal Palace's Carlo Nash clearing a Pyotr Kachura shot at goal, and Simon Tracey intercepting a cross from Bruce Dyer. Sheffield United made an early change when Kachura was replaced by Gareth Taylor midway through the first half. They were then forced to substitute Don Hutchison just before half-time after he seriously injured his shoulder. After a goalless first half, both sides had further chances to score in the second half. However, as the game appeared to be heading into extra time, the Crystal Palace captain David Hopkin scored the winning goal in the last minute of regular time with a curling strike from around 25 yards (23 m), described variously as "inspired", a "glorious Brazilian bender" and "one of the finest goals in Palace history."

Crystal Palace's victory was the first time a club from London had won a play-off final. However, in their following season, they finished bottom of the 1997–98 Premier League and were relegated back to the First Division. Sheffield United finished their next season in sixth place in the First Division, qualifying for the 1998 Football League play-offs where they lost to Sunderland in the semi-final.

== Route to the final ==
Football League First Division final table, leading positions
Pos	Team	Pld	W	D	L	GF	GA	GD	Pts
1	Bolton Wanderers	46	28	14	4	100	53	+47	98
2	Barnsley	46	22	14	10	76	55	+21	80
3	Wolverhampton Wanderers	46	22	10	14	68	51	+17	76
4	Ipswich Town	46	20	14	12	68	50	+18	74
5	Sheffield United	46	20	13	13	75	52	+23	73
6	Crystal Palace	46	19	14	13	78	48	+30	71

Sheffield United finished the regular 1996–97 season in fifth place in the Football League First Division – the second tier of the English football league system – one place and two points ahead of Crystal Palace. Both missed out on the two automatic places for promotion to the Premier League (Note: For the 1997–98 season, the FA Premier League was known as the FA Carling Premiership for sponsorship reasons, or more simply the Premiership.) and instead took part in the play-offs, along with Wolverhampton Wanderers (Wolves) and Ipswich Town, to determine the third promoted team. Sheffield United finished seven points behind Barnsley (who were promoted in second place) and twenty-five behind league winners Bolton Wanderers.

Crystal Palace faced Wolves in their play-off semi-final, with the first match of the two-legged tie taking place at Crystal Palace's home ground Selhurst Park in London on 10 May 1997. After a goalless first half, Neil Shipperley put Palace into the lead midway through the second half with a header. With a minute remaining, Dougie Freedman scored with a left-footed strike from 25 yards (23 m) to double the lead, but Jamie Smith pulled one back for Wolves almost immediately. Freedman then scored his second with a chip over Mike Stowell in the Wolves goal to secure a 3–1 first leg victory. The second leg of the semi-final was played four days later at Molineux in Wolverhampton. Mark Atkins put the home side ahead after half an hour with a low shot through Carlo Nash's legs in the Palace goal. David Hopkin equalised midway through the second half before Ady Williams made it 2–1 to Wolves with five minutes remaining. No further goals were scored and the game ended 4–3 on aggregate to Palace.

Sheffield United played Ipswich Town in their semi-final; the first leg was played at Bramall Lane in Sheffield on 10 May 1997. The home side took the lead in the 40th minute when Jan Åge Fjørtoft who held off Chris Swailes to shoot past Richard Wright in the Ipswich goal. With twelve minutes remaining, Mick Stockwell took advantage of a defensive mix-up to shoot into an empty net and the match ended level at 1–1. The return leg took place at Portman Road in Ipswich four days later. Pyotr Kachura put the visitors ahead on eight minutes with a rising shot which hit the underside of the bar before being adjudged to have crossed the goal line. James Scowcroft levelled the tie with a 32nd-minute header before Niklas Gudmundsson gave Ipswich a 2–1 lead in the 73rd minute. Their advantage lasted just four minutes until Andy Walker made it 2–2, the final score. With the aggregate scores level at 3–3, half an hour of extra time was played. No further goals were scored, and Sheffield United advanced to the final as they had scored more away goals than Ipswich.

== Match ==
=== Background ===
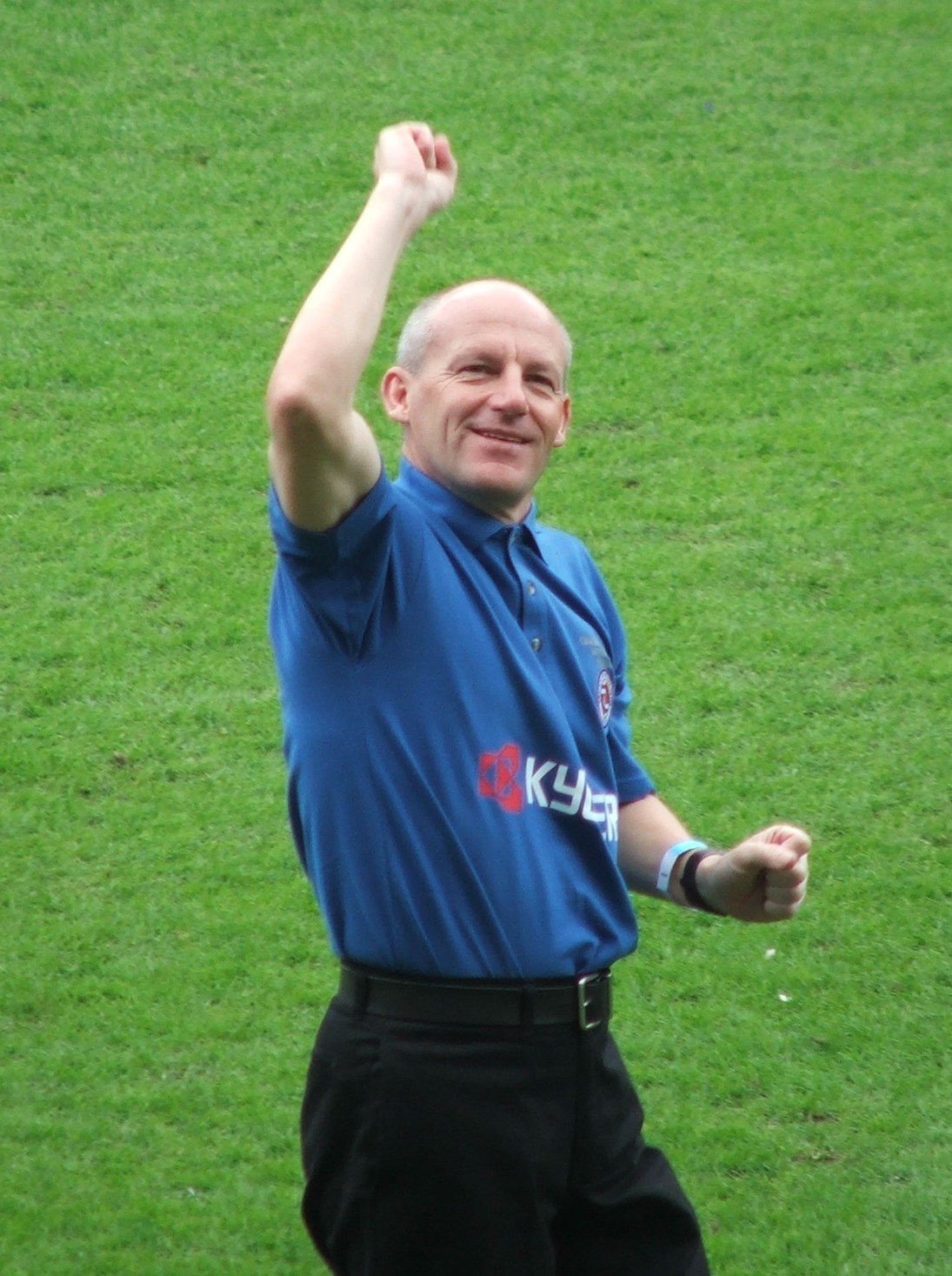
Steve Coppell (pictured in 2006) was the Crystal Palace caretaker manager.

This was Crystal Palace's third appearance in a second tier play-off final, having won the 1989 final (played over two legs) against Blackburn Rovers and losing the previous season's final in extra time against Leicester City. Sheffield United were making their first appearance in a play-off final, and were aiming to return to the top tier of English football after being relegated from the Premier League in the 1993–94 season. Crystal Palace were also seeking a quick return to the top flight, having been relegated two seasons prior. Sheffield United had won both matches between the sides during the regular season: 1–0 at Selhurst Park in December 1996 and 3–0 at Bramall Lane the following April. Four of Crystal Palace's players had scored ten or more goals during the league campaign: Bruce Dyer (17), Hopkin (13), Shipperley (12) and Freedman (11). Kachura, his club's player of the year, and Walker were joint leading marksmen for Sheffield United with 12 league goals each, while Fjørtoft, signed from Middlesbrough in January for £1 million, had scored 11 goals in 19 games.

Howard Kendall, the Sheffield United manager, was making his twelfth appearance at Wembley Stadium and opined: "It's a completely different situation to any of the other appearances there – but it's just as big, because of the prize which is at stake." He recalled the 1984 FA Cup Final, the first of his managerial appearances at the national stadium, in which he led Everton to victory over Watford: "I enjoyed that cup final over Watford because we won it ... that's the only way I will enjoy Monday. If we win." Ray Houghton, the Crystal Palace midfielder, had suffered defeat in the previous season's play-off final but remained confident: "Obviously Sheffield United are a good side, you have to be to get this close to the Premiership. But we see ourselves winning this one." Steve Coppell was the caretaker manager of Crystal Palace, having taken over at the club in late February after Dave Bassett moved to Nottingham Forest.

Sheffield United were expecting to give a late fitness test to Alan Kelly who had aggravated a knee injury during the play-off semi-final against Ipswich. With no substitute goalkeeper on the bench, Kelly was forced to play on for a further 80 minutes. He had spent time during the week before the match in a diver's training bell to increase the oxygen flow in his bloodstream. The final was broadcast in the United Kingdom on Sky Sports 3. The match was estimated in the media to be worth £8–10 million to the winning team. Neale Barry from Scunthorpe was the referee for the final.

=== First half ===
Crystal Palace kicked off the match at 3 p.m. in front of a Wembley Stadium crowd of 64,383. They adopted a 3–5–2 formation with Dyer and Shipperley leading the attack, while their opponents played 4–4–2, with Kachura and Fjørtoft up front. Simon Tracey was selected in goal for Sheffield United instead of the injured Kelly. Two minutes in, Dyer was fouled deep in Sheffield United territory by Dane Whitehouse and although the resulting free kick from Simon Rodger found Shipperley, his header was cleared. In the fifth minute, Fjørtoft received the ball on the half-way line and sent Kachura clear on goal but Nash reacted quickly, running out of his area to kick the ball into touch. Eleven minutes later, Kevin Muscat won the ball which then fell to Dyer; his cross was too close to Tracey who gathered it in the Sheffield United goal. On 18 minutes, Dyer was brought down by Roger Nilsen but the resulting free kick was over-hit by Hopkin and bounced harmlessly out of touch. David Holdsworth then went down with a knee injury after landing awkwardly but played on after receiving treatment on the pitch. In the 21st minute, Andy Roberts volleyed the ball from the edge of the penalty area. His shot was deflected behind by Don Hutchison who was injured in the process. The game continued while he received medical attention off the pitch and he returned shortly after with a heavily strapped wrist.

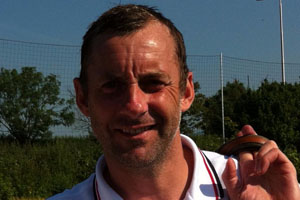
Don Hutchison (pictured in 2013) fell and badly injured his shoulder.

A pass from Roberts down the left wing in the 25th minute set Hopkin free, but his cross was cut out and deflected back to him. His second cross was cleared behind by Holdsworth. From the resulting corner, Shipperley headed just over the crossbar from 6 yards (5.5 m). Sheffield United made their first substitution of the match in the 26th minute: Kachura was replaced by Gareth Taylor, whose first contribution was to direct a looping header straight to Nash. In the 31st minute, Andy Linighan was caught in the face by Taylor's hand as they both jumped for the ball and had to receive treatment for a cut. Seven minutes later, Shipperley received the first yellow card of the game after fouling David White; the resulting free kick was cleared over his own bar by Linighan. In the 40th minute, Rodger became the second Crystal Palace player to be booked after a heavy challenge on Hutchison was deemed a foul.

With a minute of regular time remaining in the first half, Rodger's pass into the box was picked up by Dyer, but he was tackled by Carl Tiler while shooting and the ball was cleared across the Sheffield United penalty area and out for a throw-in. Hutchison then fell awkwardly after an aerial challenge with Holdsworth, injuring his right shoulder, and was stretchered off the pitch in visible pain; Lee Sandford came on to replace him. After four minutes of additional time, the referee blew his whistle to bring the goalless first half to a close.

=== Second half ===
Sheffield United kicked off the second half with no personnel changes made by either team during the half-time interval. A minute in, Taylor ran onto a long clearance from Holdsworth as Nash hesitated, but the Crystal Palace goalkeeper gathered the ball from the striker's feet. On 48 minutes, Muscat passed to Dyer on the right wing who beat Sandford but whose cross went right across the face of Sheffield United's goal. Muscat's 54th minute cross from the right wing was controlled by Dyer on his chest but his shot along the ground was weak and easily gathered by Tracey in the Sheffield United goal. In the 57th minute, Nilsen, who had never scored for his club, shot from distance but the ball passed over the Crystal Palace bar by a considerable distance. On the hour mark, Nigel Spackman played a high ball down the right flank to Fjørtoft, who played a low ball to Taylor; Dave Tuttle's tackle prevented a goal-scoring opportunity. A minute later, Taylor's headed pass from the edge of the Sheffield United box found Fjørtoft whose shot went just wide of the right-hand post of Crystal Palace's goal. In the 68th minute, Dyer passed from deep in opposition territory to Rodger, whose cross was caught by Sheffield United goalkeeper Tracey.

Sheffield United received their first booking of the game in the 70th minute when Fjørtoft was given a yellow card for an altercation with Tuttle. Two minutes later, he was brought down by Dean Gordon on the edge of the Crystal Palace penalty area, but the resulting free kick from Mitch Ward to the far post came to nothing. With 15 minutes of regular time remaining, Nilsen beat Muscat on the left wing to send in a high cross for Taylor but it was cleared by the Crystal Palace defenders. Shortly after, Nash punched clear a corner which was kicked back to him, forcing him to catch the ball before Fjørtoft was able to head it. A minute later, Dyer's cross was cleared behind by Sandford for a corner, which Shipperley headed wide.

With seven minutes of the match left, Muscat crossed from the right-hand side of the Sheffield penalty area and the ball was flicked on by Gordon, but Dyer's bicycle kick went wide of the left-hand post. In the 85th minute, Tuttle ran onto a loose ball but his low cross into the box to Shipperley was defended by Tiler, while both Hopkin's and Shipperley's subsequent attempts from close range were smothered by Tracey. Fjørtoft's long-range shot then went wide of the right-hand post. With less than a minute of regular time remaining, Gordon's strike from just outside the Sheffield United penalty area was deflected out of play by Tiler, resulting in a corner. Rodger floated in a cross which was cleared by Tiler, falling to Hopkin who controlled it before striking a right-footed curling shot from around 25 yards (23 m) into the top-right corner of the Sheffield United goal. The referee blew his whistle for full time soon after, and Crystal Palace won the match 1–0.

=== Details ===
26 May 1997
15:00 GMT

Crystal Palace	1–0	Sheffield United
Hopkin 90'	Report

Wembley Stadium, London
Attendance: 64,383
Referee: Neale Barry (Scunthorpe)

Crystal Palace	Sheffield United

GK	1	Carlo Nash
RB	2	Marc Edworthy
CB	7	Kevin Muscat
CB	5	Dave Tuttle
CB	6	Andy Linighan
LB	3	Dean Gordon
CM	4	Andy Roberts
CM	8	David Hopkin (c)
CM	11	Simon Rodger (yellow card) 40'
CF	9	Neil Shipperley (yellow card) 38'
CF	10	Bruce Dyer
Substitutes:
CM	12	Ray Houghton
FW	14	Carl Veart
FW	13	Leon McKenzie
Manager:
Steve Coppell (caretaker)

GK	1	Simon Tracey
RB	2	Mitch Ward
CB	6	David Holdsworth (c)
CB	5	Carl Tiler
LB	3	Roger Nilsen
RM	7	David White
CM	8	Nigel Spackman
CM	4	Don Hutchison	(substituted off) 45'
LM	11	Dane Whitehouse
CF	10	Pyotr Kachura	(substituted off) 26'
CF	9	Jan Åge Fjørtoft (yellow card) 70'
Substitutes:
DF	12	Lee Sandford	(substituted on) 45+2'
FW	13	Gareth Taylor	(substituted on) 26'
FW	14	Andy Walker
Manager:
Howard Kendall

== Post-match ==
Writing in The Guardian, David Lacey suggested that rarely had a Wembley final had "a better finish to an indifferent game of football than the inspired goal by David Hopkin". Hopkin recalled the previous year's play-off final in which Crystal Palace had lost to Leicester because of a last-minute goal, saying: "I know how Sheffield United feel ... It's just like us this time last year", and claimed that his goal was "the most special goal I've ever scored". Coppell recalled the winning strike: "The ball almost travelled like slow motion, the way it curled into the net. It was fabulous". Jim White, also writing in The Guardian, described the goal as a "glorious Brazilian bender ... that was not so much from a different planet from what had gone on before, but a different solar system". A 2020 retrospective on the signing of Hopkin by Crystal Palace described his winning strike as "one of the finest goals in Palace history". Hopkin made his debut for Scotland against Malta less than a week later. Kendall suggested that his side should use Crystal Palace as their model, noting: "We have to do what they have done". As a result of Sheffield United's failure to gain promotion, their overall share value dropped by more than £2 million.

Palace's victory marked the first time a club from London had won a play-off, and they were immediately installed as favourites to be relegated the following season by bookmakers. They fulfilled this prediction, ending the campaign bottom of the 1997–98 Premier League, seven points from safety, and were relegated to the First Division. Sheffield United finished their next season in sixth place in the First Division, and qualified for the 1998 Football League play-offs, having scored more goals than Birmingham City who had finished on equal points. Sheffield United lost in the play-off semi-finals to Sunderland.

== Sources ==
- CRY v SHU Play Off Final 1997 (Television production). Crystal Palace F.C. 1997.
