= 1996–97 Sheffield United F.C. season =

Sheffield United
1996–97 season
- Chairman: Mike McDonald
- Manager: Howard Kendall
- Stadium: Bramall Lane
- First Division: 5th
- FA Cup: Third round
- League Cup: Second round
- Top goalscorer: League: Pyotr Kachura/Andy Walker (12); All: Andy Walker (14)
- Average home league attendance: 16,638

During the 1996–97 English football season, Sheffield United competed in the Football League First Division.

== Season summary ==
In the 1996–97 season, Howard Kendall's first full season in charge, the Blades finished fifth in Division One to qualify for the play-offs. In the play-off final at Wembley, the Blades lost to a last minute goal from David Hopkin and Crystal Palace earned the final promotion spot to the Premier League. In June 1997, Kendall left the club by mutual consent to return to Everton for a third spell as manager.

== Players ==
=== First-team squad ===
Note: Flags indicate national team as defined under FIFA eligibility rules; some limited exceptions apply. Players may hold more than one non-FIFA nationality.

No.	Pos.	Nation	Player
—	GK	(England) ENG	Simon Tracey
—	GK	(Republic of Ireland) IRL	Alan Kelly (Note: Kelly was born in Preston, England, but also qualified to represent the Republic of Ireland internationally through his father and represented them at U-23 level before making his international debut for the Republic of Ireland in 1993.)
—	DF	(England) ENG	David Holdsworth
—	DF	(England) ENG	Paul Parker
—	DF	(England) ENG	Lee Sandford
—	DF	(England) ENG	Chris Short (Note: Short was born in Münster, West Germany (now Germany), but was raised in England.)
—	DF	(England) ENG	Carl Tiler
—	DF	(Netherlands) NED	Michel Vonk
—	DF	(Norway) NOR	Roger Nilsen
—	DF	(Australia) AUS	Doug Hodgson
—	MF	(England) ENG	Graham Anthony
—	MF	(England) ENG	Mark Beard
—	MF	(England) ENG	John Ebbrell
—	MF	(England) ENG	Charlie Hartfield
—	MF	(England) ENG	Steve Hawes

No.	Pos.	Nation	Player
—	MF	(England) ENG	Nick Henry
—	MF	(England) ENG	Paul Simpson (on loan from Derby County)
—	MF	(England) ENG	Nigel Spackman
—	MF	(England) ENG	Mitch Ward
—	MF	(England) ENG	David White
—	MF	(England) ENG	Dane Whitehouse
—	MF	(Scotland) SCO	Don Hutchison (Note: Hutchison was born in Gateshead, England, but also qualified to represent Scotland internationally through his father and would make his international debut for Scotland in March 1999, having previously represented them at B level.)
—	FW	(England) ENG	Chris Bettney
—	FW	(England) ENG	Mark Patterson
—	FW	(England) ENG	Andy Scott
—	FW	(England) ENG	Phil Starbuck
—	FW	(Wales) WAL	Gareth Taylor (Note: Taylor was born in Weston-super-Mare, England, but also qualified to represent Wales internationally through his father and made his international debut for Wales in 1995.)
—	FW	(Scotland) SCO	Andy Walker
—	FW	(Norway) NOR	Jan Åge Fjørtoft
—	FW	(Belarus) BLR	Pyotr Kachura

== Final league table ==
Pos	Team	Pld	W	D	L	GF	GA	GD	Pts	Qualification or relegation
3	Wolverhampton Wanderers	46	22	10	14	68	51	+17	76	Qualification for the First Division play-offs
4	Ipswich Town	46	20	14	12	68	50	+18	74	Qualification for the First Division play-offs
5	Sheffield United	46	20	13	13	75	52	+23	73	Qualification for the First Division play-offs
6	Crystal Palace (O, P)	46	19	14	13	78	48	+30	71	Qualification for the First Division play-offs
7	Portsmouth	46	20	8	18	59	53	+6	68	

Rules for classification: 1) Points; 2) Goals scored; 3) Goal difference
(O) Play-off winners; (P) Promoted

== Matches ==
=== Key ===
Win Draw Loss

=== Division One ===
17 August 1996	Reading	1–0	Sheffield United	Elm Park
15:00	Bernal (yellow card) 80' (yellow-red card); Quinn 81'			Attendance: 11,081

24 August 1996	Sheffield United	4–4	Birmingham City	Bramall Lane
15:00	Taylor 45', 70'; Walker 67', 72'		Furlong 9'; Newell 37'; Devlin 75' (pen.); Hunt 83'	Attendance: 16,332

7 September 1996	Oldham Athletic	0–2	Sheffield United	Boundary Park
15:00			Hutchison 27'; Sandford 87'	Attendance: 7,323

10 September 1996	Sheffield United	3–0	Bradford City	Bramall Lane
19:45	Taylor 27'; Whitehouse 45', 58'			Attendance: 12,591

14 September 1996	Sheffield United	1–3	Ipswich Town	Bramall Lane
15:00	Ward 28' (pen.); Vonk (yellow card) 61' (yellow-red card)	14,261	Sedgley 63'; Scowcroft 77', 81'

21 September 1996	Wolverhampton Wanderers	1–2	Sheffield United	Molineux Stadium
15:00	Thompson 89' (pen.)		White 76'; Taylor (red card) 82'; Katchouro 90'	Attendance: 25,170

28 September 1996	Sheffield United	2–0	Manchester City	Bramall Lane
15:00	Ward 45' (pen.); Taylor 49'			Attendance: 20,867

1 October 1996	Southend United	3–2	Sheffield United	Roots Hall
19:45	Boere 33', 71'; Marsh 54' (pen.)		Walker 7', 34'	Attendance: 3,716

12 October 1996	Sheffield United	0–0	Tranmere Rovers	Bramall Lane
15:00				Attendance: 15,059

15 October 1996	Sheffield United	3–0	Charlton Athletic	Bramall Lane
19:45	Katchouro 52', 54'; Walker 89'			Attendance: 14,080

19 October 1996	Stoke City	0–4	Sheffield United	Victoria Ground
15:00			Vonk 8', 19'; Walker 16'; Taylor 77'	Attendance: 13,581

26 October 1996	Sheffield United	1–1	Queens Park Rangers	Bramall Lane
15:00	Taylor 83'		Slade 19'	Attendance: 17,096

30 October 1996	Norwich City	1–1	Sheffield United	Carrow Road
19:45	Adams 71'		Katchouro 24'	Attendance: 14,534

3 November 1996	Grimsby Town	2–4	Sheffield United	Blundell Park
13:00	Livingstone 33', 50'		Hutchison 27'; Whitehouse 44', 82'; Katchouro 80'	Attendance: 5,935

13 November 1996	West Bromwich Albion	1–2	Sheffield United	The Hawthorns
19:45	Coldicott 80'		Walker 57'; Hutchison 60'	Attendance: 12,167

16 November 1996	Port Vale	0–0	Sheffield United	Vale Park
15:00				Attendance: 8,352

22 November 1996	Sheffield United	1–1	Bolton Wanderers	Bramall Lane
19:45	Taylor 41'		Blake 10'	Attendance: 17,069

26 November 1996	Sheffield United	2–0	Swindon Town	Bramall Lane
19:45	Taylor 6'; Katchouro 61'			Attendance: 12,301

30 November 1996	Queens Park Rangers	1–0	Sheffield United	Loftus Road
15:00	Barker 36' (pen.)			Attendance: 11,891

3 December 1996	Sheffield United	3–1	Huddersfield Town	Bramall Lane
19:45	Sandford 34'; Patterson 38'; White 61'		Payton 14'	Attendance: 14,700

7 December 1996	Sheffield United	1–0	Portsmouth	Bramall Lane
15:00	Katchouro 14'			Attendance: 16,333

14 December 1996	Oxford United	4–1	Sheffield United	Manor Ground
15:00	Aldridge 13', 21', 33'; Jemson 82'		Walker 88'	Attendance: 7,737

17 December 1996	Crystal Palace	0–1	Sheffield United	Selhurst Park
19:45			Walker 44'	Attendance: 12,801

21 December 1996	Sheffield United	0–1	Barnsley	Bramall Lane
15:00			Hendrie 85'	Attendance: 24,384

26 December 1996	Bradford City	1–2	Sheffield United	Valley Parade
13:00	Jacobs 37'; Dreyer (yellow card) 77' (yellow-red card)		Hodgson 26'; Scott 47'	Attendance: 17,475

28 December 1996	Sheffield United	2–2	Oldham Athletic	Bramall Lane
15:00	Taylor 6'; Katchouro 70'		Henry 35'; Rickers 80'	Attendance: 16,130

18 January 1997	Sheffield United	3–0	Southend United	Bramall Lane
15:00	Katchouro 15'; White 50'; Taylor 61'			Attendance: 15,049

24 January 1997	Sheffield United	2–3	Wolverhampton Wanderers	Bramall Lane
19:45	White 24', 82'		Atkins 19'; Osborn 25'; Bull 88'	Attendance: 17,490

29 January 1997	Manchester City	0–0	Sheffield United	Maine Road
19:45				Attendance: 26,551

1 February 1997	Swindon Town	2–1	Sheffield United	County Ground
15:00	Elkins 57'; Holdsworth 70' (o.g.)		Holdsworth 80'	Attendance: 8,811

9 February 1997	Sheffield United	2–3	Norwich City	Bramall Lane
12:00	Katchouro 15'; Walker 79'		Johnson 55'; Ottosson 74'; Holdsworth 83' (o.g.)	Attendance: 15,301

15 February 1997	Bolton Wanderers	2–2	Sheffield United	Burnden Park
15:00	Paatelainen 4'; Fairclough 20'		Fjørtoft 7'; Katchouro 55'	Attendance: 17,922

22 February 1997	Sheffield United	3–1	Grimsby Town	Bramall Lane
15:00	Fjørtoft 45', 62', 68'		Lester 42'	Attendance: 17,502

1 March 1997	Portsmouth	1–1	Sheffield United	Fratton Park
15:00	Haul 19'		Fjørtoft 54'	Attendance: 12,715

4 March 1997	Sheffield United	3–0	Port Vale	Bramall Lane
19:45	Ward 62' (pen.); Taylor 79'; Fjørtoft 82'			Attendance: 14,950

7 March 1997	Barnsley	2–0	Sheffield United	Oakwell
19:45	Hendrie 36'; Eaden 83'			Attendance: 14,668

15 March 1997	Sheffield United	3–1	Oxford United	Bramall Lane
15:00	Whitehouse 11'; Fjørtoft 35'; Walker 43'		Gilchrist 40'	Attendance: 16,226

18 March 1997	Ipswich Town	3–1	Sheffield United	Portman Road
19:45	Gregory 1', 11', 37'		Fjørtoft 21'	Attendance: 10,374

22 March 1997	Birmingham City	1–1	Sheffield United	St Andrews
15:00	Legg 53'		Katchouro 64'	Attendance: 14,969

29 March 1997	Sheffield United	2–0	Reading	Bramall Lane
15:00	Bodin 11' (o.g.); Walker 49'			Attendance: 15,153

31 March 1997	Huddersfield Town	2–1	Sheffield United	Galpharm Stadium
15:00	Dalton 1'; Cowan 18'; Dyson (red card) 47'		Sinnott 16' (o.g.); Henry (red card) 54'	Attendance: 14,551

5 April 1997	Sheffield United	1–2	West Bromwich Albion	Bramall Lane
15:00	Fjørtoft 69'		Coldicott 16'; Taylor 72'	Attendance: 15,004

12 April 1997	Sheffield United	3–0	Crystal Palace	Bramall Lane
15:00	Ward 2' (pen.); Fjørtoft 19'; White 89'			Attendance: 20,051

19 April 1997	Tranmere Rovers	1–1	Sheffield United	Prenton Park
15:00	Jones 26'		Whitehouse 50'	Attendance: 10,027

25 April 1997	Sheffield United	1–0	Stoke City	Bramall Lane
15:00	Tiler 66'			Attendance: 25,596

4 May 1997	Charlton Athletic	0–0	Sheffield United	The Valley
13:00				Attendance: 12,589

=== Playoffs ===
10 May 1997 Semi-final first leg	Sheffield United	1–1	Ipswich Town	Bramall Lane
15:00	Fjørtoft 41'		Stockwell 78'	Attendance: 22,312

14 May 1997 Semi-final second leg	Ipswich Town	2–2 (a.e.t.)	Sheffield United	Portman Road
19:45	Scowcroft 32'; Gudmundsson 73'		Katchouro 9'; Walker 77'; Henry (red card) 110'	Attendance: 21,467

26 May 1997 Final	Crystal Palace	1–0	Sheffield United	Wembley Stadium
15:00	Hopkin 90'			Attendance: 64,383

=== FA Cup ===
4 January 1997 Round 3	Norwich City	1–0	Sheffield United	Carrow Road
15:00	Polston 32'			Attendance: 12,356

=== League Cup ===
20 August 1996 Round 1	Sheffield United	3–0	Bradford City	Bramall Lane
19:45	Vonk 8'; White 69'; Walker 76'			Attendance: 7,575

3 September 1996 Round 1	Bradford City	1–2	Sheffield United	Valley Parade
19:45	Stallard 68'		Ward 66'; Walker 77' (pen.)	Attendance: 3,593

17 September 1996 Round 2	Stockport County	2–1	Sheffield United	Edgeley Park
19:45	Flynn 23'; Bennett 39'		Vonk 49'	Attendance: 4,004

24 September 1996 Round 2	Sheffield United	2–5	Stockport County	Bramall Lane
19:45	Taylor 34'; Katchouro 65'		Gannon 25'; Armstrong 30', 81'; Bennett 33'; Angell 62'	Attendance: 6,285

=== Steel City Cup ===
27 August 1996	Sheffield United	4–1	Sheffield Wednesday	Bramall Lane
19:45	Scott ?'; Walker ?'; Starbuck ?'; Sandford ?'		Unknown ?'	Attendance: 7,271

=== Friendlies ===
18 July 1996	Sarawak (Malaysia)	1–2	Sheffield United	Sarawak Stadium
			Walker ?'; Hutchison ?'	Attendance: 10,000

23 July 1996	Sabah (Malaysia)	0–0	Sheffield United	Likas Stadium

25 July 1996	Sarawak XI (Malaysia)	0–3	Sheffield United	Sarawak Stadium
			Walker ?'; Hartfield ?'; Starbuck ?'

5 August 1996	Linfield (Northern Ireland)	0–0	Sheffield United	Windsor Park

7 August 1996	Glenavon (Northern Ireland)	0–4	Sheffield United	Mourneview Park
			Walker ?'; Hodgson ?', ?'; Ward ?'

12 August 1996	Stocksbridge Park Steels	0–3	Sheffield United	Bracken Moor
			Walker ?', ?'; Unknown ?' (o.g.)
