= 1995–96 Sheffield United F.C. season =

Sheffield United
1995–96 season
- Chairman: Reg Brealey (until 22 September); Alan Laver (from 19 October); Mike McDonald (from 2 December)
- Manager: Dave Bassett (until 12 December); Howard Kendall (from 13 December)
- Stadium: Bramall Lane
- Division One: 9th
- FA Cup: Fourth round
- League Cup: Second round
- Top goalscorer: League: Nathan Blake (16); All: Nathan Blake (16)

The 1995–96 season was the 107th season in existence for Sheffield United, during which they played in Division One for the second successive season. In the first half of the season, events in the boardroom overshadowed those on the pitch until Mike McDonald completed a successful take over of the club. Following his arrival, manager Dave Bassett resigned and was replaced by Howard Kendall, who was provided with the funds to overhaul the squad. Many changes were made to the playing squad over the following months, meaning the club used more first-team players in one season than ever before. Although struggling for much of the season, the new arrivals brought about a late rally and the club finished a respectable ninth in the division.

== Players ==
=== First-team squad ===
Note: Flags indicate national team as defined under FIFA eligibility rules; some limited exceptions apply. Players may hold more than one non-FIFA nationality.

No.	Pos.	Nation	Player
—	DF	ENG	Gary Ablett (on loan from Everton)
—	FW	ENG	Brett Angell (on loan from Sunderland)
—	DF	ENG	Graham Anthony
—	FW	ENG	Tony Battersby
—	MF	ENG	Mark Beard
—	DF	ENG	Paul Beesley
—	FW	WAL	Nathan Blake
—	DF	ENG	Mark Blount
—	MF	ENG	Gordon Cowans
—	DF	ENG	Ross Davidson
—	DF	ENG	Scott Fitzgerald (on loan from Wilmbedon)
—	FW	NOR	Jostein Flo
—	DF	ENG	Mark Foran
—	MF	ENG	Kevin Gage
—	MF	ENG	John Gannon
—	DF	ENG	Brian Gayle (captain)
—	MF	ENG	Steve Hawes
—	MF	ENG	Adrian Heath
—	MF	WAL	Glyn Hodges
—	DF	AUS	Doug Hodgson
—	MF	ENG	Paul Holland

No.	Pos.	Nation	Player
—	MF	SCO	Don Hutchison (Note: Hutchison was born in Gateshead, England, but also qualified to represent Scotland internationally through his father and would make his international debut for Scotland in March 1999, having previously represented them at B level.)
—	GK	IRL	Alan Kelly (Note: Kelly was born in Preston, England, but also qualified to represent the Republic of Ireland internationally through his father and represented them at U-23 level before making his international debut for the Republic of Ireland in 1993.)
—	GK	ENG	Billy Mercer
—	GK	ENG	Carl Muggleton (on loan from Stoke City)
—	DF	NOR	Roger Nilsen
—	MF	ENG	Mark Patterson
—	MF	ENG	John Reed
—	MF	ENG	Paul Rogers
—	FW	ENG	Andy Scott
—	DF	ENG	Rob Scott
—	DF	ENG	Chris Short (Note: Short was born in Münster, West Germany (now Germany), but was raised in England.)
—	FW	ENG	Phil Starbuck
—	FW	WAL	Gareth Taylor (Note: Taylor was born in Weston-super-Mare, England, but also qualified to represent Wales internationally through his father and made his international debut for Wales in 1995.)
—	GK	ENG	Simon Tracey
—	DF	ENG	Dave Tuttle
—	FW	AUS	Carl Veart
—	DF	NED	Michel Vonk
—	FW	SCO	Andy Walker
—	MF	ENG	Mitch Ward
—	MF	ENG	David White
—	MF	ENG	Dane Whitehouse

== League table ==
Pos	Team	Pld	W	D	L	GF	GA	GD	Pts
7	Ipswich Town	46	19	12	15	79	69	+10	69
8	Huddersfield Town	46	17	12	17	61	58	+3	63
9	Sheffield United	46	16	14	16	57	54	+3	62
10	Barnsley	46	14	18	14	60	66	−6	60
11	West Bromwich Albion	46	16	12	18	60	68	−8	60

Rules for classification: 1) Points; 2) Goals scored; 3) Goal difference
