= 1997–98 Sheffield United F.C. season =

Sheffield United
1997–98 season
- Chairman: Mike McDonald
- Manager: Nigel Spackman (until 2 March); Russell Slade (caretaker from 2–9 March); Steve Thompson (caretaker from 3 March)
- Stadium: Bramall Lane
- First Division: 6th
- FA Cup: Semi-finals
- League Cup: Third round
- Top goalscorer: League: Deane (10); All: Deane (12); Fjørtoft (12)
- Average home league attendance: 17,942

During the 1997–98 English football season, Sheffield United competed in the Football League First Division.

== Season summary ==
On 5 August 1997, Nigel Spackman was appointed as permanent manager of Sheffield United and his side had a good start to the season but huge losses and high wages from the previous season's promotion failure led to enforced sales of key personnel. The final straw being the sale of both of the club's top scoring strikers (Brian Deane – 11 league goals – went to S.L. Benfica & Jan Åge Fjørtoft – 9 league goals – to Barnsley) on the same day. Even though leaving midseason, Deane would go on to become the team's top scorer that year, such was the lack of replacements. Spackman was unhappy over this and resigned in March 1998, leaving Thompson and Slade in caretaker charge until the end of the season. The Blades finished in the playoffs but came up short in the playoff semi-finals against Sunderland, losing 3–2 on aggregate.

== Final league table ==
Pos	Team	Pld	W	D	L	GF	GA	GD	Pts	Qualification or relegation
4	Charlton Athletic (O, P)	46	26	10	10	80	49	+31	88	Qualification for the First Division play-offs
5	Ipswich Town	46	23	14	9	77	43	+34	83	Qualification for the First Division play-offs
6	Sheffield United	46	19	17	10	69	54	+15	74	Qualification for the First Division play-offs
7	Birmingham City	46	19	17	10	60	35	+25	74	
8	Stockport County	46	19	8	19	71	69	+2	65	

Source: Statto.com
Rules for classification: 1) Points; 2) Goals scored; 3) Goal difference
(O) Play-off winners; (P) Promoted

== Results ==
Sheffield United's score comes first

=== Legend ===
Win	Draw	Loss

=== Football League First Division ===
Date	Opponent	Venue	Result	Attendance	Scorers
10 August 1997	Sunderland	H	2–0	17,324	Fjørtoft, Borbokis
16 August 1997	Wolverhampton Wanderers	A	0–0	23,102	
23 August 1997	Portsmouth	H	2–1	15,895	Fjørtoft (2)
30 August 1997	Huddersfield Town	A	0–0	14,268	
13 September 1997	Nottingham Forest	H	1–0	24,536	Taylor
20 September 1997	Oxford United	A	4–2	7,514	Deane, Fjørtoft (pen), Holdsworth, Whitehouse
27 September 1997	Birmingham City	H	0–0	20,553	
5 October 1997	Middlesbrough	A	2–1	30,000	Deane, Whitehouse
18 October 1997	Queens Park Rangers	H	2–2	18,006	Borbokis, Marcelo
21 October 1997	Stockport County	H	5–1	16,241	Whitehouse, Fjørtoft (3), Deane
25 October 1997	West Bromwich Albion	A	0–2	17,311	
1 November 1997	Tranmere Rovers	H	2–1	16,578	Tiler, Taylor
4 November 1997	Reading	A	1–0	8,132	Patterson
9 November 1997	Ipswich Town	A	2–2	9,695	Taylor, Ward
15 November 1997	Manchester City	H	1–1	23,850	Deane
18 November 1997	Bradford City	A	1–1	16,127	Deane
22 November 1997	Port Vale	A	0–0	8,017	
29 November 1997	Crewe Alexandra	H	1–0	16,973	Fjørtoft
2 December 1997	Stoke City	H	3–2	14,347	Taylor, Fjørtoft, Deane
6 December 1997	Norwich City	A	1–2	11,745	Deane
9 December 1997	Charlton Athletic	A	1–2	9,868	Marker
13 December 1997	Swindon Town	H	2–1	18,115	Holdsworth, Saunders
20 December 1997	Bury	A	1–1	6,012	Deane
26 December 1997	Stoke City	A	2–2	19,723	Taylor, Deane
28 December 1997	Charlton Athletic	H	4–1	18,677	Taylor, Saunders, Deane, Marker
10 January 1998	Sunderland	A	2–4	36,391	Saunders, Taylor
17 January 1998	Wolverhampton Wanderers	H	1–0	22,144	Marcelo
27 January 1998	Huddersfield Town	H	1–1	16,535	Saunders
31 January 1998	Portsmouth	A	1–1	12,003	Knight (own goal)
7 February 1998	Oxford United	H	1–0	16,881	Ford
22 February 1998	Birmingham City	A	0–2	17,965	
25 February 1998	Queens Park Rangers	A	2–2	9,560	Saunders, Stuart
28 February 1998	Bradford City	H	2–1	17,848	Taylor (2)
3 March 1998	Ipswich Town	H	0–1	14,120	
14 March 1998	Reading	H	4–0	15,473	Stuart, Marcelo, Taylor, Quinn
21 March 1998	Manchester City	A	0–0	28,496	
28 March 1998	Port Vale	H	2–1	15,860	Marcelo, Saunders
1 April 1998	Nottingham Forest	A	0–3	21,512	
7 April 1998	Middlesbrough	H	1–0	18,421	Saunders
11 April 1998	Norwich City	H	2–2	16,915	Stuart, Borbokis
13 April 1998	Swindon Town	A	1–1	5,956	Marcelo
18 April 1998	Bury	H	3–0	16,056	Stuart (pen), Saunders (2)
25 April 1998	West Bromwich Albion	H	2–4	21,248	Stuart (pen), Marcelo
28 April 1998	Tranmere Rovers	A	3–3	7,526	Quinn, Saunders, Devlin
30 April 1998	Crewe Alexandra	A	1–2	5,759	Hamilton
3 May 1998	Stockport County	A	0–1	9,683	

=== First Division play-offs ===
Round	Date	Opponent	Venue	Result	Attendance	Goalscorers
SF First Leg	10 May 1998	Sunderland	H	2–1	23,800	Marcelo, Borbokis
SF Second Leg	13 May 1998	Sunderland	A	0–2 (lost 2–3 on agg)	40,092	

=== FA Cup ===
Round	Date	Opponent	Venue	Result	Attendance	Goalscorers
R3	3 January 1998	Bury	H	1–1	14,009	Fjørtoft
R3R	13 January 1998	Bury	A	2–1	4,920	Saunders, Fjørtoft
R4	24 January 1998	Ipswich Town	A	1–1	14,654	Saunders
R4R	3 February 1998	Ipswich Town	H	1–0	14,144	Hutchison (pen)
R5	13 February 1998	Reading	H	1–0	17,845	Sandford
QF	7 March 1998	Coventry City	A	1–1	23,084	Marcelo
QFR	17 March 1998	Coventry City	H	1–1 (won 3–1 on pens)	29,034	Holdsworth
SF	5 April 1998	Newcastle United	N	0–1	53,452	

=== League Cup ===
Round	Date	Opponent	Venue	Result	Attendance	Goalscorers
R1 First Leg	12 August 1997	Wrexham	A	1–1	3,644	Borbokis
R1 Second Leg	26 August 1997	Wrexham	H	3–1 (won 4–2 on agg)	7,181	Deane, Whitehouse, Fjørtoft
R2 First Leg	16 September 1997	Watford	A	1–1	7,154	Scott
R2 Second Leg	23 September 1997	Watford	H	4–0 (won 5–1 on agg)	7,511	Day (own goal), Whitehouse (2), Deane
R3	14 October 1997	Walsall	A	1–2	8,239	Borbokis

== Players ==
=== First-team squad ===
Squad at end of season

Note: Flags indicate national team as defined under FIFA eligibility rules; some limited exceptions apply. Players may hold more than one non-FIFA nationality.

No.	Pos.	Nation	Player
—	GK	(England) ENG	Matthew George
—	GK	(England) ENG	Simon Tracey
—	GK	(Wales) WAL	Andy Dibble
—	GK	(Republic of Ireland) IRL	Alan Kelly (Note: Kelly was born in Preston, England, but also qualified to represent the Republic of Ireland internationally through his father and represented them at U-23 level before making his international debut for the Republic of Ireland in 1993.)
—	DF	(England) ENG	Earl Barrett
—	DF	(England) ENG	Ian Hamilton
—	DF	(England) ENG	David Holdsworth
—	DF	(England) ENG	David Lee (on loan from Chelsea)
—	DF	(England) ENG	Nicky Marker
—	DF	(England) ENG	Jon O'Connor (on loan from Everton)
—	DF	(England) ENG	Wayne Quinn
—	DF	(England) ENG	Lee Sandford
—	DF	(England) ENG	Chris Short (Note: Short was born in Münster, West Germany (now Germany), but was raised in England.)
—	DF	(England) ENG	Carl Tiler
—	DF	(England) ENG	Chris Wilder
—	DF	(Republic of Ireland) IRL	Paul McGrath (Note: McGrath was born in Ealing, England, but was raised in the Republic of Ireland and made his international debut for the Republic of Ireland in 1985.)
—	DF	(Netherlands) NED	Michel Vonk
—	DF	(Norway) NOR	Roger Nilsen
—	DF	(Greece) GRE	Vasilios Borbokis
—	DF	(Greece) GRE	Traianos Dellas
—	MF	(England) ENG	Mark Beard
—	MF	(England) ENG	Adam Burley
—	MF	(England) ENG	Jon Cullen
—	MF	(England) ENG	Kevin Davies

No.	Pos.	Nation	Player
—	MF	(England) ENG	Shaun Derry
—	MF	(England) ENG	Paul Devlin (Note: Devlin was born in Birmingham, England, but also qualified to represent Scotland internationally through his father and would make his international debut for Scotland in October 2002.)
—	MF	(England) ENG	Bobby Ford
—	MF	(England) ENG	Steve Hawes
—	MF	(England) ENG	Nick Henry
—	MF	(England) ENG	Ryan Ludlam
—	MF	(England) ENG	Graham Stuart
—	MF	(England) ENG	Mitch Ward
—	MF	(England) ENG	David White
—	MF	(England) ENG	Dane Whitehouse
—	MF	(England) ENG	Curtis Woodhouse
—	MF	(Scotland) SCO	Don Hutchison (Note: Hutchison was born in Gateshead, England, but also qualified to represent Scotland internationally through his father and would make his international debut for Scotland in March 1999, having previously represented them at B level.)
—	FW	(England) ENG	Brian Deane
—	FW	(England) ENG	Lee Morris
—	FW	(England) ENG	Mark Patterson
—	FW	(England) ENG	Andy Scott
—	FW	(Wales) WAL	Ian Rush (on loan from Newcastle United)
—	FW	(Wales) WAL	Dean Saunders
—	FW	(Wales) WAL	Gareth Taylor (Note: Taylor was born in Weston-super-Mare, England, but also qualified to represent Wales internationally through his father and made his international debut for Wales in 1995.)
—	FW	(Scotland) SCO	Andy Walker
—	FW	(Norway) NOR	Jan Åge Fjørtoft
—	FW	(Finland) FIN	Ville Lehtinen
—	FW	(Belarus) BLR	Pyotr Kachura
—	FW	(Brazil) BRA	Marcelo
