= Kevin Gage =

Kevin Gage is the name of:

- Kevin Gage (actor) (born 1959), American actor
- Kevin Gage (footballer) (born 1964), British footballer
