= Lee Sandford =

English footballer

Personal information
- Full name: Lee Robert Sandford
- Date of birth: 22 April 1968 (age 58)
- Place of birth: Lambeth, England
- Height: 1.80 m (5 ft 11 in)
- Position: Defender

Senior career*
Years	Team	Apps	(Gls)
1985–1989	Portsmouth	72	(1)
1989–1996	Stoke City	258	(8)
1996–2002	Sheffield United	151	(4)
1997	→ Reading (loan)	5	(0)
2001	→ Stockport County (loan)	7	(0)
2002–2003	Woking	12	(0)
Total		505	(13)

International career
1986	England Youth	2	(0)
- * Club domestic league appearances and goals

Lee Robert Sandford (born 22 April 1968) is an English former footballer who made more than 480 first-team appearances as a defender. He played in the Football League for Portsmouth, Stoke City, Sheffield United, Reading and Stockport County.

== Career ==
Sandford was born in Lambeth but moved to Basingstoke where he trialed for the local team Basingstoke Town. He was spotted by scouts at Portsmouth and signed on as a professional in December 1985. His coach was Alan Ball and once Ball had replaced Bobby Campbell as manager he promoted Sandford to the first team. He made 90 appearances for Pompey in five seasons before new manager John Gregory made it clear he did not want him in the first team. So Sandford received an offer from Stoke City where Ball had gone to and he joined them for a fee of £140,000.

He instantly became a regular at the Victoria Ground but was unable to prevent Stoke suffering relegation in 1989–90. Ball was feeling the wrath of the Stoke support as did most of his signings and Ball was sacked in January 1991 as Stoke went on to finish in their lowest ever position in 1990–91. New manager Lou Macari's fitness regime's benefited Sandford greatly and he became a vital member of the team at Stoke. From left-back he would provide great service for the pacey Mark Stein to run on to and provided him with the winning goal in the 1992 Football League Trophy final. He played in 52 matches in 1992–93 as Stoke won the Second Division title. He remained at Stoke until the 1995–96 season which saw him playing in every match that season. He left Stoke in July 1996 for Sheffield United after making 324 appearances for Stoke scoring 13 goals.

As at Stoke, Sandford became popular with Blades fans, making 142 league starts for the Bramall Lane outfit. He went on loan on two occasions while he was at United; firstly in 1997 Sandford played five matches for Reading and in 2001 he played seven matches for Stockport County. Released from his contract at the end of the 2001–02 season he had trials at Bournemouth and Mansfield Town. Sandford finished his career at non-league Woking before retiring.

== Personal life ==
After retiring from football, Sandford set up his own stock trading coaching business. In 2014, he released his autobiography titled: Goals To Gold.

== Career statistics ==
Appearances and goals by club, season and competition
Club	Season	League			FA Cup		League Cup		Other		Total	
Club	Season	Division	Apps	Goals	Apps	Goals	Apps	Goals	Apps	Goals	Apps	Goals
Portsmouth	1985–86	Second Division	7	0	1	0	4	1	1 (Note: Appearances in Full Members' Cup)	0	13	1
Portsmouth	1986–87	Second Division	0	0	0	0	0	0	0	0	0	0
Portsmouth	1987–88	First Division	22	1	1	0	2	0	0	0	25	1
Portsmouth	1988–89	Second Division	31	0	2	0	2	0	2	0	37	0
Portsmouth	1989–90	Second Division	13	0	0	0	3	0	0	0	16	0
Portsmouth	Total		72	1	4	0	11	1	3	0	90	2
Stoke City	1989–90	Second Division	23	2	1	0	0	0	0	0	24	2
Stoke City	1990–91	Third Division	32	2	3	1	3	0	2 (Note: Appearances in Football League Trophy)	0	40	3
Stoke City	1991–92	Third Division	38	0	2	0	3	0	10 (Note: Eight Appearances and three goals in Football League Trophy and two appearances in Third Division play-offs)	3	53	3
Stoke City	1992–93	Second Division	42	2	2	1	4	0	4	0	52	3
Stoke City	1993–94	First Division	42	1	4	0	3	0	5 (Note: Appearances in the Anglo-Italian Cup)	0	54	1
Stoke City	1994–95	First Division	35	1	2	0	3	0	6	0	46	1
Stoke City	1995–96	First Division	46	0	2	0	3	0	4 (Note: Two Appearances in the Anglo-Italian Cup and two appearances in First Division play-offs)	0	55	0
Stoke City	Total		258	8	16	2	19	0	31	3	324	13
Sheffield United	1996–97	First Division	30	2	1	0	3	0	2 (Note: Appearances in First Division play-offs)	0	36	2
Sheffield United	1997–98	First Division	15	0	6	1	0	0	2	0	23	1
Sheffield United	1998–99	First Division	35	0	5	0	4	0	—		44	0
Sheffield United	1999–2000	First Division	43	1	2	0	3	0	—		48	1
Sheffield United	2000–01	First Division	22	1	1	0	3	0	—		26	1
Sheffield United	2001–02	First Division	6	0	2	0	0	0	—		8	0
Sheffield United	Total		151	4	17	1	13	0	4	0	185	5
Reading (loan)	1997–98	First Division	5	0	0	0	0	0	—		5	0
Stockport County (loan)	2001–02	First Division	7	0	0	0	0	0	—		7	0
Woking	2002–03	Football Conference	12	0	0	0	0	0	0	0	12	0
Career total			505	13	37	3	43	1	38	3	623	20

== Honours ==
Stoke City

- Football League Second Division: 1992–93
- Associate Members' Cup: 1991–92
