= Ashley Fickling =

English footballer and physiotherapist

Personal information
- Full name: Ashley Fickling
- Date of birth: 15 November 1972 (age 53)
- Place of birth: Sheffield, England
- Position: Defender

Senior career*
Years	Team	Apps	(Gls)
1991–1995	Sheffield United	0	(0)
1992	→ Darlington (loan)	14	(0)
1993	→ Darlington (loan)	1	(0)
1995–1998	Grimsby Town	39	(2)
1998	→ Darlington (loan)	8	(0)
1998–2001	Scunthorpe United	69	(1)
2001–2002	Scarborough	7	(0)
Total		138	(3)
- * Club domestic league appearances and goals

Ashley Fickling (born 15 November 1972) is an English former professional footballer and current football physiotherapist.

As a player, he was a defender who played between 1991 and 2002 notably for Grimsby Town. He also had spells with Sheffield United, Darlington, Scunthorpe United and Scarborough. Since retirement he has made his trade in the sport as a Physiotherapist and was formerly the head physio of Sheffield Wednesday.

== Playing career ==
Fickling started his career at his home town club of Sheffield United. He struggled to make an impact at Bramall Lane and made only six appearances in total between 1991 and 1995, incidentally none of them were league games. While with United, Fickling spent two spells on loan with Darlington.

In March 1995 he signed on a free transfer with fellow English First Division club Grimsby Town. While at the club, he struggled to make an impact under managers Brian Laws and Alan Buckley, and following another loan with Darlington, he was released and signed for Scunthorpe United in May 1998.

Fickling remained with The Iron until 2001, where he moved briefly to play for Scarborough before retiring from the game due to injury problems.

== Physiotherapist ==
Upon retirement, Fickling trained to be a sports physiotherapist, completing his bachelor's degree at the University of Salford and joined Sheffield Wednesday in 2007.
