= John Reed (footballer) =

English footballer (born 1972)

Personal information
- Full name: John Paul Reed
- Date of birth: 27 August 1972 (age 54)
- Place of birth: Rotherham, England
- Position: Midfielder

Senior career*
| Years | Team | Apps | (Gls) |
| 1990–1997 | Sheffield United | 15 | (2) |
| 1991 | → Scarborough (loan) | 14 | (6) |
| 1991 | → Scarborough (loan) | 6 | (0) |
| 1993 | → Darlington (loan) | 10 | (2) |
| 2003 | → Mansfield Town (loan) | 13 | (2) |
| 1997–1998 | Blackpool | 3 | (0) |
| 1998 | Bury | 0 | (0) |
| 1998 | Gainsborough Trinity | ? | (?) |
| 1998–1999 | Leek Town | ? | (?) |
| 1999 | Ethnikos Piraeus | 7 | (0) |
| 1999–2000 | Gainsborough Trinity | ? | (?) |
| ? | Matlock Town | ? | (?) |
| ? | Frickley Athletic | ? | (?) |
| 2003 | Ilkeston Town | ? | (?) |
- * Club domestic league appearances and goals as of 07:54, 11 July 2011 (UTC)

John Paul Reed (born 27 August 1972) is an English former professional footballer who played as a midfielder. Born in Rotherham, England, he played for Sheffield United, Scarborough, Darlington, Mansfield Town and Blackpool in the Football League. Reed subsequently spent five years playing in the English non-league, along with a brief spell at Greek side Ethnikos Piraeus.

== Playing career ==
Reed came through the youth system at Sheffield United but never managed to establish himself in the first team. He was loaned to Scarborough, Darlington and Mansfield Town to get first team experience, but eventually left Bramall Lane having only made 17 appearances in total, scoring two goals.

Reed signed for Blackpool during the 1997 close season, but the move proved to be an unsuccessful one as he made only three substitute appearances in the league for The Tangerines. A short spell at Bury followed before he drifted into non-league. Reed's career was hampered by knee injuries, and he subsequently moved regularly around non-league sides in England, although he also had a short spell in Greece with Ethnikos Piraeus.
