= Dane Whitehouse =

English footballer

Personal information
- Full name: Dane Lee Whitehouse
- Date of birth: 14 October 1970 (age 56)
- Place of birth: Sheffield, England
- Height: 5 ft 9 in (1.75 m)
- Position: Midfielder

Youth career
- Sheffield United

Senior career*
Years	Team	Apps	(Gls)
1989–2000	Sheffield United	231	(38)
- * Club domestic league appearances and goals as of 19:43, 20 June 2010 (UTC)

Dane Lee Whitehouse (born 14 October 1970) is an English former footballer who played in the Football League for Sheffield United. Whitehouse was an accomplished left winger, who was equally comfortable filling in at left back. He served his only club, Sheffield United, for 13 years between 1987 and 2000, making 278 appearances and scoring 51 goals in all competitions.

== Club career ==
Whitehouse signed professionally for Sheffield United in July 1987 and made his first team debut against Blackpool in 1988, aged just 18. He made a good early impression, but was in and out of the team for most of his early professional career. He played a part in the Blades' promotion from the old Third Division in 1988, and again in the next season when United were promoted to the top flight. He began to establish himself as a first-team regular during the 1991–92 season. His goals included a double against Chelsea in a 2–1 win, and he also chipped in with three FA Cup goals.

In the first Steel City derby of the 1991–92 campaign, Whitehouse scored against local rivals Sheffield Wednesday in a 2–0 win at Bramall Lane. In the return fixture at Hillsborough, he was once again on target, scoring the first goal.

After a game against Bristol City, Whitehouse broke his leg and missed a large proportion of the 1992–93 season. Despite the seriousness of the injury, he returned to play a part towards the end of the campaign. He starred in the closing stages of the Blades' run to the FA Cup semi-final, making an appearance at Wembley Stadium in the defeat to Sheffield Wednesday. He was also on the scoresheet twice in the final game of the season, when United hammered Chelsea 4–2.

Despite an opening day win over Swindon Town the next season, United were again struggling to keep their Premier League status intact. In a 3–2 home win over West Ham United, Whitehouse smashed the ball into the top corner from nearly 30 yards for what was one of the goals of the season. Despite Whitehouse's goals, United were relegated on the final game of the season, losing 3–2 away at Chelsea.

Whitehouse was again in good scoring form at the start of the 1994–95 season. He eventually finished with 10 goals in all competitions, which included a hat-trick in the League Cup against Stockport County, but the Blades failed to win promotion.

After a disappointing 1995–96 season United parted with longtime manager Dave Bassett. Howard Kendall took charge and, despite a clear out of players, Whitehouse was still a first-team regular in the new regime. He finished with six goals in the 1995–96 season, which included a goal against Arsenal at Highbury in the FA Cup. During the 1997–98 campaign, Whitehouse was a regular up to November. In a game against Port Vale he was crudely tackled by Gareth Ainsworth, and Whitehouse suffered a serious knee injury. Despite an attempt to get back to fitness, which included a few outings for the reserves, Whitehouse was forced to retire.

== Career statistics ==
Club	Season	League			National Cup		League Cup		Other		Total	
Club	Season	Division	Apps	Goals	Apps	Goals	Apps	Goals	Apps	Goals	Apps	Goals
Sheffield United	1988–89	Third Division	5	0	0	0	0	0	1 (Note: Appearance(s) in Football League Trophy)	0	6	0
Sheffield United	1989–90	Second Division	12	1	5	0	0	0	4 (Note: Three appearances and one goal in Yorkshire & Humberside Cup, one appearance in Full Members' Cup)	1	21	2
Sheffield United	1990–91	First Division	4	0	0	0	1	0	0	0	5	0
Sheffield United	1991–92	First Division	34	7	4	1	3	0	1 (Note: Appearance(s) in Full Members' Cup)	2	42	10
Sheffield United	1992–93	Premier League	14	5	3	0	1	1	—		18	6
Sheffield United	1993–94	Premier League	38	5	1	0	2	0	—		41	5
Sheffield United	1994–95	Division One	39	7	1	0	3	3	0	0	43	10
Sheffield United	1995–96	Division One	38	4	3	1	2	1	—		43	6
Sheffield United	1996–97	Division One	30	6	0	0	4	0	3 (Note: Appearance(s) in Division One play-offs)	0	37	6
Sheffield United	1997–98	Division One	17	3	0	0	5	3	0	0	22	6
Career total			231	38	17	2	21	8	9	3	278	51
