= David Holdsworth =

English footballer (born 1968)

Personal information
- Full name: David Gary Holdsworth
- Date of birth: 8 November 1968 (age 57)
- Place of birth: Walthamstow, England
- Height: 6 ft 1 in (1.85 m)
- Position: Defender

Youth career
- Watford

Senior career*
Years	Team	Apps	(Gls)
1986–1996	Watford	258	(10)
1996–1999	Sheffield United	93	(4)
1999–2002	Birmingham City	85	(7)
2002	→ Walsall (loan)	9	(1)
2002	Bolton Wanderers	0	(0)
2002–2003	Scarborough	16	(1)
2003–2005	Gretna	32	(0)
Total		493	(23)

International career
1986	England Youth	5	(0)
1989	England U21	1	(0)

Managerial career
- 2008: Ilkeston Town
- 2008–2010: Mansfield Town
- 2011–2013: Lincoln City
- 2013–2014: Goole
- * Club domestic league appearances and goals

David Gary Holdsworth (born 8 November 1968) is an English former professional footballer turned manager.

As a player, he was a defender who played between 1986 and 2005 for Watford, Sheffield United, Birmingham City, Walsall, Bolton Wanderers and Gretna. In 2008, he moved into management and has since been in charge of Ilkeston Town, Mansfield Town, Lincoln City and Goole.

== Playing career ==
=== Watford ===
Holdsworth started his career at Watford in the mid-1980s, going on to make more than 250 league appearances for the club. At Watford he played alongside his twin brother Dean Holdsworth.

=== Sheffield United ===
In October 1996, he left Watford for a new challenge at Sheffield United. In his first season, he helped United to the 1997 Football League First Division play-off final but they were defeated by Crystal Palace. He also helped them to the 1997–98 FA Cup semi final at Old Trafford where they were defeated by Newcastle United. In the quarterfinal replay against Coventry City, United found themselves 1–0 down at Bramall Lane with two minutes left. Holdsworth popped up to equalise from a corner, sending the game to extra time and then penalties, which United went on to win.

=== Birmingham City ===
In March 1999 Holdsworth transferred to Birmingham City. He helped Birmingham to the playoffs at the end of that season where they faced his former club Watford. However Holdsworth was sent off as they lost on penalties. He spent three full seasons there, helping them to the 2001 League Cup Final in which he was an unused substitute in the defeat to Liverpool.

In January 2002 he went on loan to Walsall. At Walsall he scored once against Coventry but was sent off twice in 3–0 defeats to Sheffield Wednesday and Wolves.

=== Later career ===
After being released by Birmingham in 2002, he joined Bolton Wanderers on a free transfer where he played alongside his brother Dean again. However, he only made one appearance for the Trotters: in a League Cup defeat to Bury (David started and his brother Dean came on as a substitute). Shortly afterwards he joined Scarborough in the Football Conference and then Scottish club Gretna where he retired. Whilst at Gretna he scored once, his goal coming in the Scottish Cup against Dumbarton.

=== International career ===
He was capped once for England at Under-21 level.

== Managerial career ==
After retiring from playing he became reserve team manager at Gretna, where he was appointed director of youth development in May 2006, but was sacked in a cost-cutting exercise a few months later. On 20 May 2008, Holdsworth was appointed to his first managerial role, taking over at Northern Premier League Premier Division side Ilkeston Town from Nigel Jemson, the first appointment of new owner Check Whyte.

On 29 December 2008, Holdsworth was appointed manager of Conference National club Mansfield Town having led Ilkeston to sixth in the Northern Premier League Premier Division, ten points off first placed Hednesford Town with two games in hand.

On 18 November 2010, it was announced that Holdsworth had agreed to leave Field Mill by mutual consent after less than two years with the club.

On 24 October 2011, Holdsworth was named Lincoln City manager until the end of the 2011–12 season, replacing Steve Tilson. He left the club by mutual consent on Sunday 17 February 2013, leaving Lincoln 18th in the Conference Premier.

On 14 October 2013, he returned to management with Goole with his former Sheffield United teammate Curtis Woodhouse acting as his assistant. Holdsworth stepped down as Goole manager on 27 January 2014 with Woodhouse taking over the role.

On 3 August 2018, Holdsworth was appointed director of football at Carlisle United. On 23 February 2022, Holdsworth stepped down from this position.

== Personal life ==
His twin brother Dean Holdsworth is also a footballer turned football manager. On 18 September 2010, they became the first twins to manage against each other in the top five divisions of English football, when Dean was manager of Newport County and David manager of Mansfield Town. Newport won the match 1–0.

David Holdsworth's house was featured on an episode of Through the Keyhole.

== Managerial statistics ==
As of match played 27 February 2013

Managerial record by team and tenure
Team	From	To	Record					Ref
Team	From	To	P	W	D	L	Win %	Ref
Mansfield Town	29 December 2008	18 November 2010	91	37	20	34	40.7	
Lincoln City	24 October 2011	27 February 2013	73	21	20	32	28.8	
Total			164	58	40	66	35.4	

== Honours ==
Birmingham City

- Football League Cup runner-up: 2000–01
