= David Hopkin =

Scottish footballer (born 1970)

Personal information
- Full name: David Isaac Hopkin
- Date of birth: 21 August 1970 (age 56)
- Place of birth: Greenock, Scotland
- Position: Head of youth recruitment

Team information
- Current team: Glasgow Rangers

Youth career
- Port Glasgow Rangers

Senior career*
Years	Team	Apps	(Gls)
1989–1992	Greenock Morton	48	(4)
1992–1995	Chelsea	40	(1)
1995–1997	Crystal Palace	83	(21)
1997–2000	Leeds United	73	(6)
2000–2001	Bradford City	21	(0)
2001–2002	Crystal Palace	39	(4)
2002–2003	Greenock Morton	11	(1)
Total		291	(39)

International career
1997–1999	Scotland	7	(2)

Managerial career
- 2015–2018: Livingston
- 2018–2019: Bradford City
- 2019–2020: Greenock Morton
- 2021: Ayr United
- * Club domestic league appearances and goals

David Isaac Hopkin (born 21 August 1970) is a Scottish professional football coach and former player who was most recently the manager of Ayr United.

As a player he was a midfielder from 1989 until 2003, notably in the English Premier League including spells with Chelsea, Leeds United and Bradford City. He also played in the Football League for Crystal Palace. He started and finished his career in his native Scotland with Greenock Morton. He earned seven caps for Scotland, scoring two goals.

Since retiring as a player he has worked as a coach at Greenock Morton and Livingston, becoming head coach of Livingston in 2015. Hopkin guided Livingston to successive promotions in 2017 and 2018, but opted to leave the club in May 2018. He then had short spells as manager of, successively, Bradford City, Greenock Morton and Ayr United. He is now the Head of Youth Recruitment at Rangers FC.

== Club career ==
Hopkin started his career at Morton before moving to Premier League side Chelsea in 1992. He did not play many games for Chelsea and was later sold to Crystal Palace in 1995 for £850,000 just after their relegation from the Premier League.

At Selhurst Park he wrote himself into Palace folklore by scoring a 90th-minute winner in the 1997 First Division play-off final against Sheffield United, to put Palace back into the Premier League. He also scored a key goal in the semi-final against Wolverhampton Wanderers. After two years with Palace, Hopkin moved on to Leeds United and then to their local rivals Bradford City.

He later went on to play for Crystal Palace again before returning to Scotland with his hometown club Greenock Morton in a player/coaching role – however he had to retire in 2003 due to a recurring ankle injury. During his second playing spell at Morton he scored twice, once in the League Cup against St Mirren and once in the league against Gretna.

== International career ==
Hopkin won seven caps for the Scotland national team, scoring twice in a 1998 FIFA World Cup qualification match against Belarus.

== Coaching career ==
=== Morton coach ===
Hopkin and Derek Collins had a brief spell as joint caretaker managers at Greenock Morton, when they occupied the dugout for a match against Albion Rovers in the 2002–03 season. Hopkin became part of the coaching staff at junior league club Maryhill, before returning to Cappielow as the manager of Morton's reserve side alongside Jonatan Johansson.

After Allan Moore was sacked as manager of Morton, Hopkin again took interim charge of the first team assisted by Derek Anderson. As well as continuing as manager of the Development squad, he became assistant manager to the newly appointed boss Kenny Shiels. Hopkin took Shiels' place as the club's match-day interviewee after Shiels became unable to do so on medical advice. Hopkin resigned as assistant manager of Morton in April 2014.

=== Livingston ===
Hopkin left his post as reserve team manager to become assistant head coach at Livingston to Mark Burchill. Hopkin took temporary charge of the Livingston first team after Burchill left the club in December 2015. After three games, Livingston appointed Hopkin as head coach until the end of the 2015–16 season. However, he could not prevent the team's relegation from the Scottish Championship.

Hopkin led the "Livi Lions" to the Scottish League One title and promotion back to the second tier after only one season, secured on 8 April 2017 with four games to play. In their first season back in the Championship, Livingston finished second in the division and reached the Premiership promotion/relegation playoff final. Livingston won the two-legged final against Partick Thistle, securing a second successive promotion. Hopkin opted to leave Livingston in May 2018, at the end of his contract.

=== Bradford City ===
Bradford City appointed Hopkin as their manager on 4 September 2018. Hopkin resigned on 25 February 2019, the team having won only seven of his 35 games in charge.

=== Morton ===
Hopkin was appointed manager of Scottish Championship club Greenock Morton in May 2019. He resigned in December 2020 after the club appeared to be in financial trouble .

=== Ayr United ===
Hopkin became manager of Ayr United in March 2021. He left this position six months later.

== Career statistics ==
Appearances and goals by national team and year
National team	Year	Apps	Goals
Scotland	1997	4	2
Scotland	1999	3	0
Total		7	2

Scores and results list Scotland's goal tally first.

No.	Date	Venue	Opponent	Score	Result	Competition
1.	7 September 1997	Pittodrie Stadium, Aberdeen	Belarus	2–0	4–1	1998 FIFA World Cup qualification
2.	7 September 1997	Pittodrie Stadium, Aberdeen	Belarus	4–1	4–1	1998 FIFA World Cup qualification

== Managerial statistics ==
As of 7 September 2021

Team	From	To	Record				
Team	From	To	G	W	D	L	Win %
Livingston	December 2015	May 2018	118	63	21	34	53.39
Bradford City	September 2018	February 2019	35	7	11	17	20.00
Greenock Morton	May 2019	December 2020	48	17	12	19	35.42
Ayr United	March 2021	September 2021	20	5	8	7	25.00
Total			221	92	52	77	41.63

== Honours ==
=== As a player ===
Crystal Palace

- Football League First Division play-offs: 1997

=== As a manager ===
Livingston

- Scottish League One: 2016–17
- Scottish Premiership play-offs : 2017–18
