= Ross Davidson (footballer, born 1973) =

English footballer

Personal information
- Full name: Ross James Davidson
- Date of birth: 13 November 1973 (age 52)
- Place of birth: Chertsey, England
- Position: Defender

Senior career*
Years	Team	Apps	(Gls)
1991–1993	Walton & Hersham		
1993–1996	Sheffield United	2	(0)
1994–1996	→ Chester City (loan)	10	(1)
1996–1999	Chester City	125	(4)
1999–2000	Barnet	9	(0)
2000–2001	Shrewsbury Town	43	(0)
- * Club domestic league appearances and goals

Ross Davidson (born 11 November 1973 in Chertsey, England) is an English former professional footballer who played as a defender for Sheffield United, Chester City and Shrewsbury Town in the Football League.

== Career ==
Davidson was signed for Sheffield United by manager Dave Bassett in June 1993 from non-league Walton and Hersham. He was never able to make the break into the first team and was eventually given a free transfer to Chester City in 1996. He made over 100 appearances for The Blues before spells with Barnet and Shrewsbury Town where he finished his career. At Shrewsbury he scored once, his goal coming in the League Cup against Preston North End.
