= Mark Blount (footballer) =

English footballer

Personal information
- Full name: Mark Blount
- Date of birth: 5 January 1974 (age 52)
- Place of birth: Derby, England
- Height: 5 ft 10 in (1.78 m)
- Position: Defender

Senior career*
Years	Team	Apps	(Gls)
1993–1994	Gresley Rovers	0	(0)
1994–1996	Sheffield United	13	(0)
1996	Scarborough	0	(0)
1996	Peterborough United	5	(0)
1997–2003	Burton Albion	129	(17)
Total		147	(17)
- * Club domestic league appearances and goals

Mark Blount (born 5 January 1974) is an English former footballer who played as a defender. Born in Derby, he played for Sheffield United and Peterborough United in the Football League, and had spells with Gresley Rovers, Scarborough and Burton Albion in non-league.

== Career ==
Blount was signed for Sheffield United by manager Dave Bassett in February 1994 for a fee of £12,500 from Gresley Rovers. He was never able to make the break into the first team and was eventually released in 1996 upon the arrival of Howard Kendall as the new Blades manager, having made only fifteen appearances in total. Following his release he spent some time with Scarborough and Peterborough United before finishing his career at Burton Albion.
