= Mark Foran =

English footballer

Personal information
- Full name: Mark James Foran
- Date of birth: 30 October 1973 (age 52)
- Place of birth: Aldershot, England
- Position: Defender

Senior career*
Years	Team	Apps	(Gls)
1990–1993	Millwall	0	(0)
1993–1996	Sheffield United	11	(1)
1994	→ Rotherham United (loan)	3	(0)
1995	→ Wycombe Wanderers (loan)	5	(0)
1996–1997	Peterborough United	25	(1)
1997	→ Lincoln City (loan)	2	(0)
1997	→ Oldham Athletic (loan)	1	(0)
1997–2000	Crewe Alexandra	31	(1)
2000–2002	Bristol Rovers	43	(2)
2002–2003	Telford United	37	(5)
2003–2006	Northwich Victoria		
- * Club domestic league appearances and goals

Mark James Foran (born 30 October 1973) is an English former professional footballer.

Notable achievements include winning the 1991 FA Youth Cup with Millwall F.C.

Mark Foran was once referred to as a "giant" by the then Peterborough United manager Barry Fry. The 6'4" defender featured briefly during footage of the video "Great Balls of Fire" hosted by Vinnie Jones when Fry was heard to shout "We've got a giant, why don't you fucking use him!" at one of his players.

During an FA Cup tie, playing for then Division 3 Bristol Rovers against then Premiership Derby County he man marked Fabrizio Ravanelli, the former Italian international. Rovers won the tie 3–1 at Pride Park.

A five-game loan spell at Wycombe Wanderers in the mid-1990s saw Foran voted by supporters as the best ever player to represent the club. He backed this up when he scored a headed goal against them whilst playing for Peterborough United. This was unexpected as Foran played for Slough Town and was fondly remembered as one of the greatest defenders for the club.

A compendium of injuries contributed to Foran's shortened career, suffering three broken legs including one while playing for Crewe reserves.

He drifted into semi-professional football in the early 2000s before retiring to pursue a career outside the game.
