= Pyotr Kachuro =

Belarusian footballer (born 1972)

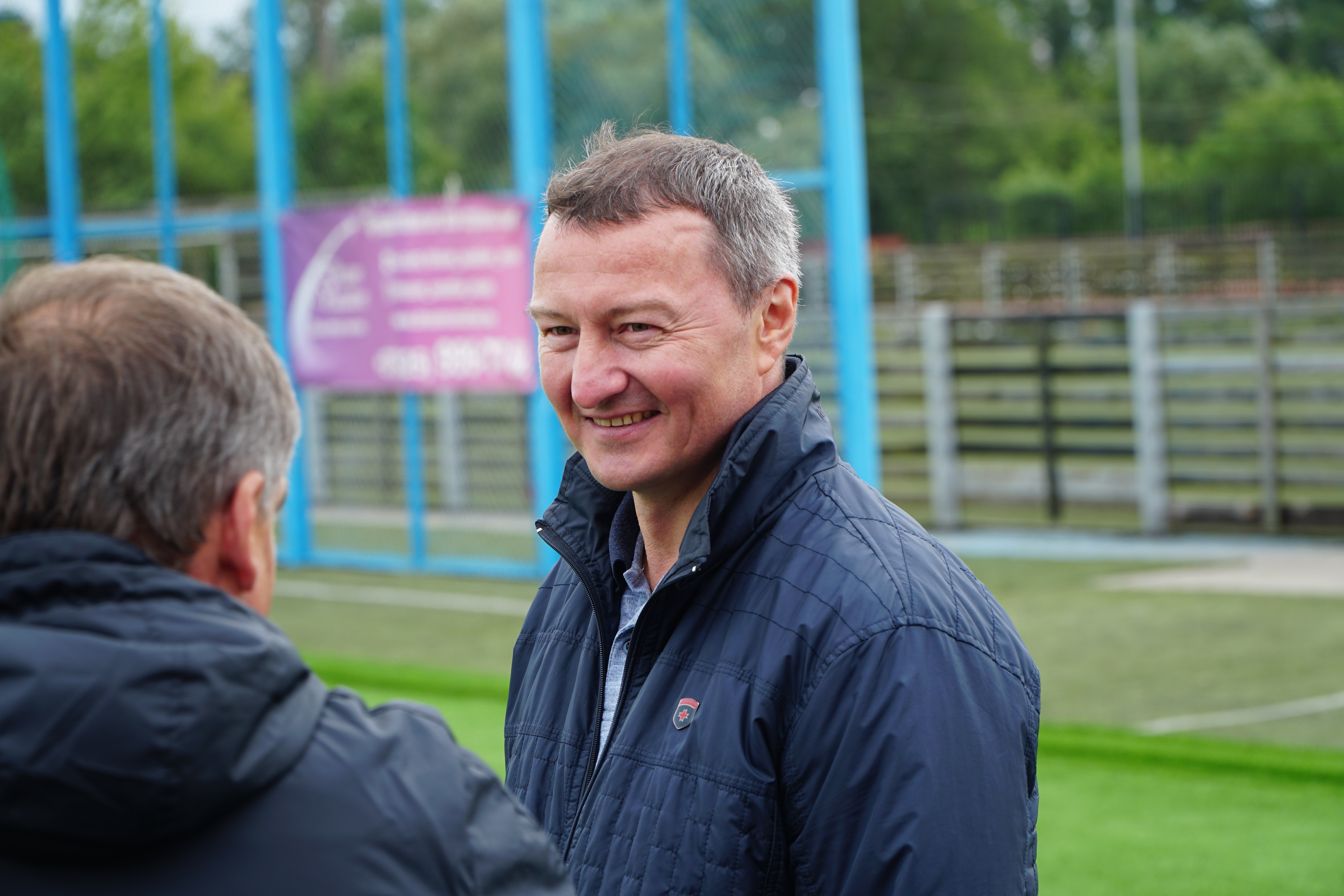

Personal information
- Full name: Pyotr Petrovich Kachuro
- Date of birth: 2 August 1972 (age 54)
- Place of birth: Orsha, Belarusian SSR, Soviet Union
- Height: 6 ft 0 in (1.83 m)
- Position: Forward

Youth career
- 1989–1990: Dinamo Minsk

Senior career*
Years	Team	Apps	(Gls)
1990–1991	Dinamo Minsk	4	(0)
1992–1993	Dinamo-93 Minsk	61	(28)
1994–1996	Dinamo Minsk	60	(52)
1996–2000	Sheffield United	95	(19)
2000	Chengdu Wuniu	19	(5)
2001–2002	Dinamo Minsk	29	(16)
2002–2005	Sokol Saratov	82	(24)
2005	Dinamo Minsk	1	(0)
Total		351	(144)

International career
1994–2002	Belarus	29	(5)

Managerial career
- 2006: Dinamo Minsk (assistant)
- 2006–2007: Dinamo Minsk
- 2010–2011: Neman Grodno (assistant)
- 2012–2013: Dinamo Minsk (assistant)
- 2013–2014: Bereza-2010 (assistant)
- 2014: Khayr Vahdat
- 2016: Dinamo Minsk (assistant)
- 2017: Lida
- * Club domestic league appearances and goals

Pyotr Petrovich Kachuro (Belarusian: Пётр Пятровіч Качура; Russian: Пётр Петрович Качуро; born 2 August 1972) is a Belarusian former footballer who played as a forward. Starting off with his home town club Dynamo Minsk he went on to have spells at Sheffield United in England and Chengdu Wuniu in China before returning to his homeland, playing for Minsk for a second spell and later for Sokol Saratov. Following his retirement he went on to have a spell as manager at Dinamo Minsk in 2006–07. Internationally, he made 29 appearances, scoring five goals for the Belarus national team.

During his time in England he used an Anglicised version of his name and was referred to as Petr or Peter Katchouro.

== Club career ==
Kachuro started his playing career at his hometown club FC Dinamo Minsk, the most successful team in Belarus having won the Belarusian Premier League a record seven times since it began in 1992. Kachuro was part of the side which won the Belarusian Premier League in 1995.

In July 1996, Sheffield United signed Kachuro for £650,000. He scored 14 goals in his first season as the Blades finished in fifth place in Division One and qualified for the Playoffs. However, the Blades lost 1–0 to Crystal Palace in the final at Wembley, with a last minute David Hopkin goal shattering United's promotion dream. Kachuro was awarded for his performances by being given the 1996–97 player of the season award at Bramall Lane.

The following season he made just 16 appearances, due to injuries, as the Blades qualified for the playoffs once again by finishing in sixth place. This time they lost in the semi-finals, with Sunderland defeating the Blades 3–2 on aggregate, after the Blades had held a 2–1 lead going into the second leg. Kachuro failed to score that season, but made amends in the next season, as he scored six goals in 16 appearances as the Blades failed to qualify for the playoffs by finishing in a disappointing eighth place, nine points from the playoffs. Kachuro missed a large part of the season due to a punctured lung injury in the 4–0 home defeat to Sunderland.

His final season in England saw him score three goals in 30 appearances as the Blades woeful start condemned them to a 16th-place finish, as Neil Warnock replaced Adrian Heath as manager in early December and rescued the Blades from relegation.

In March 2000 Kachuro was transferred to Chinese side Chengdu Wuniu on a free transfer. He stayed there for one season before re-joining his hometown club Dinamo Minsk in August 2000.

== International career ==
Kachuro made his debut for the Belarus national team on 25 May 1994, in a 3–1 loss against Ukraine in a friendly.

== Coaching career ==
After Kachuro retired from playing, Kachuro became a football coach. His former club, FC Dinamo Minsk, appointed him in November 2006, but replaced him after the first match of the 2007 Belarusian Premier League season.

== Career statistics ==
=== International ===
Appearances and goals by national team and year
National team	Year	Apps	Goals
Belarus	1994	3	0
Belarus	1995	7	1
Belarus	1996	8	2
Belarus	1997	4	1
Belarus	1998	1	0
Belarus	1999	2	0
Belarus	2000	–	
Belarus	2001	3	0
Belarus	2002	1	1
Total		29	5

Scores and results list Belarus's goal tally first, score column indicates score after each Kachuro goal.

List of international goals scored by Pyotr Kachuro
No.	Date	Venue	Opponent	Score	Result	Competition
1	29 July 1995	Žalgiris Stadium, Vilnius, Lithuania	Lithuania	1–1	1–1	Friendly
2	1 May 1996	Stadion Miejski, Mielec, Poland	Poland	1–1	1–1	Friendly
3	27 May 1996	City Stadium, Maladzyechna, Belarus	Azerbaijan	1–0	2–2	Friendly
4	7 September 1997	Pittodrie Stadium, Aberdeen, Scotland	Scotland	1–3	1–4	1998 FIFA World Cup qualification
5	17 April 2002	Stadion Oláh Gábor Út, Debrecen, Hungary	Hungary	5–1	5–2	Friendly

== Honours ==
Dinamo Minsk

- Belarusian Premier League: 1993–94, 1994–95, 1995
- Belarusian Cup: 1993–94

Individual

- Belarusian Premier League top scorer: 1993–94
- Sheffield United F.C. Player of the Year: 1997
