= Jan Åge Fjørtoft =

Norwegian footballer (born 1967)

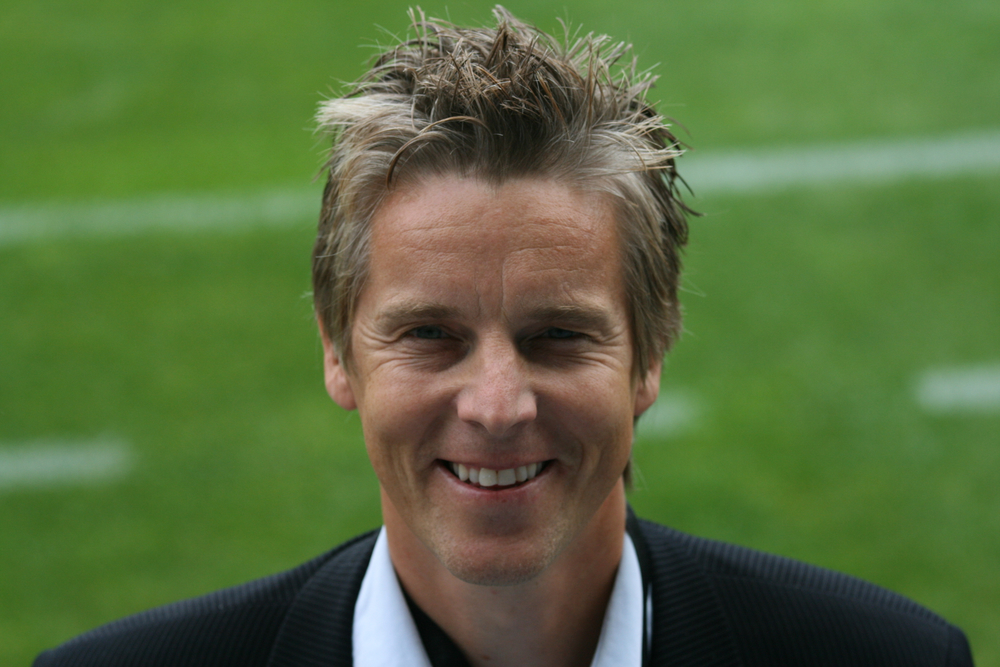
- Fjørtoft in 2008

Personal information
- Full name: Jan Åge Fjørtoft
- Date of birth: 10 January 1967 (age 59)
- Place of birth: Gursken, Møre og Romsdal, Norway
- Height: 1.90 m (6 ft 3 in)
- Position: Centre forward

Youth career
- Gursken
- 1982–1983: Hødd

Senior career*
Years	Team	Apps	(Gls)
1984–1985	Hødd	39	(34)
1986–1987	HamKam	44	(17)
1988–1989	Lillestrøm	33	(20)
1989–1993	Rapid Wien	129	(63)
1993–1995	Swindon Town	72	(28)
1995–1997	Middlesbrough	41	(10)
1997–1998	Sheffield United	34	(19)
1998	Barnsley	34	(9)
1998–2001	Eintracht Frankfurt	52	(14)
2001	Stabæk	15	(6)
2002	Lillestrøm	4	(0)
Total		497	(219)

International career
1984	Norway U19	6	(5)
1985–1987	Norway U21	14	(6)
1986–1996	Norway	71	(20)
- * Club domestic league appearances and goals

Jan Åge Fjørtoft (born 10 January 1967) is a Norwegian former professional footballer. A powerful centre forward with goalscoring ability, he played professionally in Norway, Austria, England and Germany. In total, he scored 308 goals in 614 games in these four countries. He made 71 appearances for the Norwegian National Team, captaining the squad in 15 of them, and scored 20 goals for the Norway national team. A pinnacle moment in his national team career was the qualification and participation in the 1994 World Cup held in the US. This marked Norway's return to the World Cup stage for the first time since 1938. His nickname was Fjøra (lit. "The Feather").

== Club career ==
Fjørtoft started his senior career at Hødd in the second league of Norway as a 17-year-old, scoring 9 league goals in 17 matches in the 1984 season. In the 1985 season, he scored 25 league goals in 22 games.

After starting in Norway with Hødd, HamKam and Lillestrøm and spending four seasons in the Austrian Bundesliga with Rapid Wien – where he became only the second foreigner to be Player of the Year in 1989 – Fjørtoft spent several seasons in England during the 1990s. He joined Swindon Town in the summer of 1993 following their promotion to the Premiership, costing the Wiltshire club a record £500,000. He had a slow start to his career at Swindon and endured a poor start to their first-ever top-division campaign, failing to win any of their first 16 games. Fjørtoft failed to find the net until after Christmas but scored 13 goals from his final 17 games, including a hat-trick in a 3–1 win against Coventry City on 5 February 1994. However, it was not enough to prevent Swindon from going down in bottom place with a mere five league wins having conceded 100 league goals.

Fjørtoft continued to score frequently during the 1994–95 season and helped Swindon reach the League Cup semi-finals, but their league form was disastrous once more and he transferred to Middlesbrough on 23 March 1995 for £1.3 million. By this stage, he had scored 25 goals in all competitions for the Robins and was one of the highest scorers in the English league that season.

Meanwhile, Fjørtoft was a regular player for Middlesbrough as soon as he joined the club, and helped them finish the season as First Division champions. Due to a restructuring of the league, they were the only team to gain automatic promotion to the Premiership in 1995. He was a regular player throughout the 1995–96 campaign and, as the Norwegian partnered Brazilian playmaker Juninho, Boro finished in a respectable 12th place; although they had occupied fourth place in late autumn, a disastrous run of form coinciding with an injury crisis during mid-season sabotaged their hopes of European qualification or a title challenge. Fjørtoft had scored six goals from 26 Premier League games.

However, the arrival of Italian forward Fabrizio Ravanelli pushed him down the pecking order for the 1996–97 season, and he was sold to First Division promotion chasers Sheffield United for £700,000 on 31 January 1997. In his final game for Middlesbrough Fjørtoft scored a crucial goal against Hednesford Town in the fourth round of the FA Cup. Boro would go on to reach the final after his departure.

After the Blades lost to Crystal Palace in the playoff final, he played at United until 15 January 1998, when he joined newly promoted Barnsley to have another crack at the Premiership. He was unable though, to prevent Barnsley's only season at Premier League level ending in relegation, although scoring a respectable six goals in 15 Premiership games. He left Barnsley in November 1998 to join Eintracht Frankfurt, calling time on his five-year spell in England.

Fjørtoft's next stop came in Germany with Eintracht Frankfurt, where he spent three years (25 November 1998 – 31 May 2001). He became a cult hero for the club, scoring a decisive 89th-minute goal in the final game of the 1998–99 season, saying to himself melancholically: "probably the best goal this season", keeping Eintracht up. He returned home to Norway with Stabæk, and finished his career with Lillestrøm in 2002, retiring at the age of 35.

== International career ==
Between 1986 and 1996, Fjørtoft collected 71 caps for the Norway national team, being part of the nation's squad in the 1994 FIFA World Cup, where he appeared as a starter against Mexico (1–0) and Italy (0–1).

== Post-playing career ==
After retiring from professional football, Jan Åge Fjørtoft transitioned into various roles within the football industry and beyond, including broadcasting, front office, strategic consultancy, government advisory, ambassador roles, philanthropy and educational initiatives, and podcasting. In 2004, he assumed the Director of Football position at Lillestrøm (LSK), where he served for four and a half years until the end of the 2008 season. This included two cup final appearances (lost in 2005, won in 2007), three consecutive top-four league finishes, and a Royal League final appearance.

=== Media career ===
While playing in England, Jan Åge Fjørtoft was a guest and worked regularly for Sky as they were developing a new way of presenting football on TV. Both at the 1998 World Cup and Euro 2002, Jan Åge worked as a pundit for NRK in Norway. After he retired in 2002, he signed with NRK, becoming the first full-time pundit on Norwegian TV. During this period, he also pursued his coaching badges, stating, "Not because I want to be a coach, but because I want to systematize what I have learned and experienced throughout my career. Whatever path I choose, this sort of education will help me." While undertaking the position of Director of Football at Lillestrøm Sportsklubb, he concurrently joined Viaplay in 2004. Serving as both host and pundit, he contributed to their Champions League, FA Cup, League Cup, and World Cup broadcasts. Presently, he maintains an active role at Viaplay, as a senior pitch-side reporter for their Premier League broadcasts.

During the 2021/2022 season, he produced a documentary titled "Haaland – The Big Decision," providing an intimate portrayal of Erling Haaland's journey, particularly during his transition from Borussia Dortmund. The documentary, which followed Erling in his private moments, was released after Erling signed with Manchester City.

Fjørtoft has been a constant presence in the media landscape since 2002, contributing to various TV channels such as Viaplay, Sky Germany, ESPN, and ServusTV in various punditry roles. In 2011–14, he worked as a football pundit on Sky Germany. He later became a pundit on ESPN FC and according to a January 2022 segment he did, he believes his goal scoring statistics on Wikipedia are incorrect and wishes them to be corrected. He also shares his insights through columns, notably for Bild Zeitung in Germany. In collaboration with his son, Markus Fjørtoft, he runs "The German Fussball Podcast."

=== Strategic Consultant and Advisor ===
Jan Åge Fjørtoft runs his own Strategic Communication Company, offering consultation to companies and CEOs in Norway and internationally. His strategic insights were sought after by the Norwegian Olympic, the Confederation of Sport, and WADA, where he served as a Strategic Advisor from 2016 to 2019.

His advisory roles extended to The Norwegian Olympic and Paralympic Committee and Confederation of Sport, where he notably served as a close advisor to Secretary General Inge Andersen during the preparation and execution of the Youth Olympic Games in Norway.

From 2016 to 2019, he served as a Strategic Advisor alongside Rune Andersen for the vice president of the World Anti-Doping Agency (WADA), Linda Hofstad Helleland. In this capacity, he collaborated closely with the Council of Europe, IOC, FIFA, and various governments worldwide.

A noteworthy achievement during this period was a collaborative effort with Helleland, conceptualizing and executing an Anti-Doping Conference at the White House in Washington D.C. This event witnessed the participation of nine governments and athletes from around the world.

Since 2008, Fjørtoft has served as an advisor to the Norwegian Football Association, actively participating in the "Handshake for Peace" initiative from its inception when the founder, Kjetil Siem, conceived the idea. In April 2014 Fjørtoft was named Team manager of the National Team, working close with the national coach, Per-Mathias Høgmo.

=== Government Advisor and Ambassador ===
In 2015, Fjørtoft was appointed by the Minister for Sport of Norway to lead a Strategic Group advising the government on optimal sport utilization for society. He delivered the group's findings in 2017. Serving as Eintracht Frankfurt's Ambassador in Germany, Fjørtoft, in collaboration with the club, founded the Norway-Forum in 2021, fostering stronger ties between the Frankfurt region and Norway.

=== Philanthropy and Educational Initiatives ===
Beyond professional engagements, Jan Åge Fjørtoft is dedicated to promoting sports accessibility. Since 1990, he has run sports schools, ensuring the last five years have been free for pupils. His commitment extends globally, with schools organized not only in Norway but also in England and Scotland. He chaired MTG's foundation "MTG United for Peace" and later held a similar role at Millicom. Additionally, from 2008 onwards, he advised the Norwegian Football Association, playing a vital role in the "Handshake for Peace" initiative.

== Personal life ==
Fjørtoft's son, Markus, was a professional footballer.

== Career statistics ==
=== Club ===
Appearances and goals by club, season and competition
Club	Season	League			National cup		League cup		Europe		Other		Total	
Club	Season	Division	Apps	Goals	Apps	Goals	Apps	Goals	Apps	Goals	Apps	Goals	Apps	Goals
Ham-Kam	1986	1. divisjon	22	7	3	6	–		–		–		25	13
Ham-Kam	1987	1. divisjon	22	10	6	5	–		–		2 (Note: Appearances in Playoffs)	0	30	15
Ham-Kam	Total		44	17	9	11	0	0	0	0	2	0	55	28
Lillestrøm	1988	1. divisjon	22	14	3	2	–		–		–		25	16
Lillestrøm	1989	1. divisjon	11	6	3	2	–		0	0	–		14	8
Lillestrøm	Total		33	20	6	4	0	0	0	0	0	0	39	24
Rapid Wien	1989–90	Austrian Bundesliga	34	17	5	3	–		6	3	–		45	23
Rapid Wien	1990–91	Austrian Bundesliga	33	17	5	4	–		2	0	–		40	21
Rapid Wien	1991–92	Austrian Bundesliga	34	16	3	6	–		–		–		37	22
Rapid Wien	1992–93	Austrian Bundesliga	28	13	4	4	–		2	2	–		34	19
Rapid Wien	Total		129	63	17	17	0	0	10	5	0	0	156	85
Swindon Town	1993–94	Premier League	36	12	2	1	1	0	–		–		39	13
Swindon Town	1994–95	First Division	36	16	2	1	8	9	–		2 (Note: Appearances in Anglo-Italian Cup)	0	48	26
Swindon Town	Total		72	28	4	2	9	9	0	0	2	0	87	39
Middlesbrough	1994–95	First Division	8	3	0	0	0	0	–		–		8	3
Middlesbrough	1995–96	Premier League	28	6	0	0	6	2	–		–		34	8
Middlesbrough	1996–97	Premier League	5	1	2	1	1	0	–		–		8	2
Middlesbrough	Total		41	10	2	1	7	2	0	0	0	0	50	13
Sheffield United	1996–97	First Division	17	10	0	0	0	0	–		3 (Note: Appearances in 1997 Football League play-offs)	1	20	11
Sheffield United	1997–98	First Division	17	9	2	2	3	1	–		–		22	12
Sheffield United	Total		34	19	2	2	3	1	0	0	3	1	42	23
Barnsley	1997–98	Premier League	15	6	0	0	0	0	–		–		15	6
Barnsley	1998–99	First Division	19	3	0	0	6	4	–		–		25	7
Barnsley	Total		34	9	0	0	6	4	0	0	0	0	40	13
Eintracht Frankfurt	1998–99	Bundesliga	17	6	0	0	–		–		–		17	6
Eintracht Frankfurt	1999–00	Bundesliga	21	5	1	2	–		–		–		22	7
Eintracht Frankfurt	2000–01	Bundesliga	14	3	1	1	–		–		–		15	4
Eintracht Frankfurt	Total		52	14	2	3	0	0	0	0	0	0	54	17
Stabæk	2001	Tippeligaen	15	6	3	2	–		–		–		18	8
Lillestrøm	2002	Tippeligaen	4	0	3	0	–		0	0	–		7	0
career total			458	185	48	42	25	16	10	5	7	1	548	249

=== International ===
Appearances and goals by national team and year
National team	Year	Apps	Goals
Norway	1986	1	0
Norway	1987	2	0
Norway	1988	4	2
Norway	1989	10	3
Norway	1990	9	3
Norway	1991	6	2
Norway	1992	4	0
Norway	1993	9	5
Norway	1994	11	1
Norway	1995	11	4
Norway	1996	4	0
Total		71	20

Scores and results list Norway's goal tally first, score column indicates score after each Fjørtoft goal

List of international goals scored by Jan Åge Fjørtoft
No.	Date	Venue	Opponent	Score	Result	Competition
1	28 July 1988	Ullevaal Stadion, Oslo, Norway	Brazil	1–0	1–1	Friendly
2	14 September 1988	Ullevaal Stadion, Oslo, Norway	Scotland	1–1	1–2	1990 FIFA World Cup qualifier
3	31 May 1989	Ullevaal Stadion, Oslo, Norway	Austria	2–0	4–1	Friendly
4	14 June 1989	Ullevaal Stadion, Oslo, Norway	Yugoslavia	1–2	1–2	1990 FIFA World Cup qualifier
5	25 October 1989	Mohammed Al-Hamad Stadium, Kuwait City, Kuwait	Kuwait	2–2	2–2	Friendly
6	7 February 1990	Ta' Qali National Stadium, Attard, Malta	Malta	1–0	1–1	Rothmans tournament
7	31 October 1990	Bislett Stadion, Oslo, Norway	Cameroon	4–0	6–1	Friendly
8	31 October 1990	Bislett Stadion, Oslo, Norway	Cameroon	5–0	6–1	Friendly
9	23 May 1991	Ullevaal Stadion, Oslo, Norway	Romania	1–0	1–0	Friendly
10	25 September 1991	Ullevaal Stadion, Oslo, Norway	Czechoslovakia	2–2	2–3	Friendly
11	30 March 1993	Khalifa International Stadium, Doha, Qatar	Qatar	3–0	6–1	Friendly
12	30 March 1993	Khalifa International Stadium, Doha, Qatar	Qatar	4–0	6–1	Friendly
13	30 March 1993	Khalifa International Stadium, Doha, Qatar	Qatar	5–0	6–1	Friendly
14	28 April 1993	Ullevaal Stadion, Oslo, Norway	Turkey	2–0	3–1	1994 FIFA World Cup qualifier
15	13 October 1993	Stadion Miejski, Poznań, Poland	Poland	2–0	3–0	1994 FIFA World Cup qualifier
16	14 December 1994	Ta' Qali National Stadium, Attard, Malta	Malta	1–0	1–0	UEFA Euro 1996 qualifier
17	26 April 1995	Ullevaal Stadion, Oslo, Norway	Luxembourg	2–0	5–0	UEFAEuro 1996 qualifier
18	25 May 1995	Ullevaal Stadion, Oslo, Norway	Ghana	2–1	3–2	Friendly
19	25 May 1995	Ullevaal Stadion, Oslo, Norway	Ghana	3–1	3–2	Friendly
20	7 June 1995	Ullevaal Stadion, Oslo, Norway	Malta	1–0	2–0	UEFA Euro 1996 qualifier

== Honours ==
Lillestrøm

- 1. divisjon: 1989

Middlesbrough

- Football League First Division: 1994–95

Individual

- 1. divisjon top scorer: 1988
- Player of the year in Austria (Krone-Fußballerwahl): 1989
- Football League First Division Team of the Year: 1994–95
