= Mitch Ward =

English footballer

Personal information
- Full name: Mitchum David Ward
- Date of birth: 19 June 1971 (age 55)
- Place of birth: Sheffield, England
- Position: Midfielder

Youth career
- ?–1989: Sheffield United

Senior career*
Years	Team	Apps	(Gls)
1989–1997	Sheffield United	154	(11)
1990	→ Crewe Alexandra (loan)	4	(1)
1997	→ Everton (loan)	1	(0)
1997–2000	Everton	23	(0)
2000–2003	Barnsley	77	(0)
2003–2004	York City	31	(0)
Total		290	(12)
- * Club domestic league appearances and goals

Mitchum David Ward (born 19 June 1971) is an English retired professional footballer who played in the English Football League and the Premier League for Sheffield United, Crewe Alexandra, Everton, Barnsley and York City.

== Career ==
Born in Sheffield, Ward started his career at his local club Sheffield United after graduating through the youth ranks. He was promoted to the first team alongside his best friend in professional football, left-winger Dane Whitehouse, who also enjoyed a consistent run in the first eleven. Despite Ward's versatility, he initially struggled to hold down a starting place each week. He went on loan with Dario Gradi's Crewe Alexandra where he played 7 times scoring once in the league and again in the Football League Cup.

Ward returned to United full of confidence but was frustrated by former Blades manager Dave Bassett's rotation policy. Following a match with Watford in the First Division, Ward scored twice yet still found himself on the bench for the following game. It could be argued that Ward's inability to keep his place was not due to his form, but more due to his versatility, something that would be as much a burden for Ward as it would a strength. Indeed, throughout 7 years, Ward had played in every area except goal. But for much of his time, when he was in the side, Ward could be found roaming his favoured position, the right-wing before then Blades manager Howard Kendall (who had replaced Bassett in December 1995) converted the versatile pro into an all-action full-back, it was in this position that Ward played arguably his best football. During this time Ward became known as a lethal penalty taker with a composure not often seen in a utility player. A highlight during this time was when he scored twice in an FA Cup quarter-final tie against Blackburn Rovers as his side went on to win on penalties and reach the semi-finals. He spent 8 years in total with Sheff United before being sold to Howard Kendall's Everton for £750,000 on 25 November 1997. Kendall had returned to the Toffees after missing out on promotion with the Blades and raided his former club not only for Ward but for United's then-record signing Don Hutchison and journeyman centre-back Carl Tiler.

Ward's life in Liverpool was not so great. He got off to a bad start as he was on the losing side against Chelsea conceding a penalty in a 0-2 defeat only a day after signing. Following this nightmare start, Ward toiled hard to make an impression in a lacklustre Everton side. But he only had a run of four games before picking up a hamstring injury. An unproductive come-back in February 1998 consisted of only another four matches before he finally succumbed to what was diagnosed as bad ankle ligament damage. However it would be another two months before the true problem was revealed, a fracture of the ankle. Ward would not appear for the Toffees again until October 1998. By this time Howard Kendall had been replaced with former Rangers manager Walter Smith. Smith decided to bring Ward back into the cauldron of the Merseyside derby at Goodison Park, Ward did not let him down, showing glimpses of a return to his previous excellent Sheff United form. Ward's reward was the Captain's armband the following season in an ill-fated Football League Cup tie against Oxford. Again, injury was to keep Ward out for much of 1999–2000 season and it was no surprise when his name was linked with a return to Bramall Lane. Overall, he made less than 30 appearances in a three-year span, never finding the back of the net and with a quarter of them coming from the subs bench, his final game was an away match with Leeds United on 8 May 2000. He was eventually sold at the end of the 1999–2000 season to Barnsley for £200,000.

Ward enjoyed his return to his Yorkshire roots and found a new lease of life in a more central role, operating primarily in defensive midfield ironically under the tutelage of former manager Dave Bassett. Ward spent 3 years at Oakwell, a vital first-team player before being released on a free and joining the youngest manager in the League, Chris Brass at York City.

Ward was a popular player at Bootham Crescent. However, he left before the end of his first and only season with the Minstermen over a contract dispute. Ward played out his professional career with non-league outfit Altrincham whom he joined in 2004.
