= Graham Anthony =

English footballer

Personal information
- Full name: Graham John Anthony
- Date of birth: 9 August 1975 (age 51)
- Place of birth: South Shields, England

Senior career*
Years	Team	Apps	(Gls)
1993–1997	Sheffield United	3	(0)
1996	→ Scarborough (loan)	2	(0)
1997	Swindon Town	3	(0)
1997	Plymouth Argyle	5	(0)
1997–2000	Carlisle United	69	(3)
2000–2006	Barrow	245	(12)
2006–?	Workington	65	(11)
- * Club domestic league appearances and goals

Graham John Anthony (born 9 August 1975) is an English former professional footballer who played as a midfielder for Sheffield United, Swindon Town, Plymouth Argyle and Carlisle United in The Football League.

== Career ==
Born in South Shields, Anthony was a trainee at Sheffield United but failed to make the breakthrough into the first team squad, making only three league appearances as a substitute. After brief spells at Swindon Town and Plymouth Argyle he settled at Carlisle United where he played regularly for three seasons.

He subsequently dropped into non-league football before retiring some time after 2006 to run a guest house in Cumbria.
