= Carl Tiler =

English footballer

Personal information
- Date of birth: 11 February 1970 (age 56)
- Place of birth: Sheffield, England
- Height: 1.88 m (6 ft 2 in)
- Position: Defender

Youth career
- Barnsley

Senior career*
Years	Team	Apps	(Gls)
1988–1991	Barnsley	71	(3)
1991–1995	Nottingham Forest	69	(1)
1994	→ Swindon Town (loan)	2	(0)
1995–1997	Aston Villa	12	(1)
1997	Sheffield United	23	(2)
1997–1998	Everton	21	(1)
1998–2001	Charlton Athletic	45	(2)
2001	→ Birmingham City (loan)	1	(0)
2001–2003	Portsmouth	19	(1)
Total		263	(11)

International career
1990–1991	England U21	13	(0)
- * Club domestic league appearances and goals

Carl Tiler (born 11 February 1970) is an English former professional footballer who played as a central defender.

He made more than 250 appearances in Premier League and the Football League and was part of a number of successful sides during his career despite rarely establishing himself as a first choice player in his position. He notably played in the top flight for Nottingham Forest, Aston Villa, Everton and Charlton Athletic as well as other spells for Barnsley, Swindon Town, Sheffield United, Birmingham City and Portsmouth. He is also a former England U21 who earned 13 caps between 1990 and 1991.

== Playing career ==
Tiler was born in Sheffield, South Yorkshire. A tough central defender, he started his career at Barnsley, where his form attracted interest from top clubs, before a £1.4million move to Brian Clough's Nottingham Forest in the summer of 1991.

He played regular first team football for his first two seasons at Forest but then sustained a serious ankle injury, around the time of Forest's relegation in 1993, which kept him out for the whole of the following season, when Forest won promotion. He regained fitness and went on loan to Swindon Town in the 1994–95 season, with his place in the centre of defence at the City Ground now occupied by Colin Cooper.

Having played a total of 85 games for Forest, Tiler joined Aston Villa for £750,000 in October 1995. He sustained a ruptured hamstring after 70 minutes of his debut against Everton which took a full 10 months to heal. He then played a further 14 games for Villa before sealing a £500,000 move back to his home town team Sheffield United. With Sheffield United he reached the 1996–97 First Division playoff final at Wembley against Crystal Palace, which the Blades lost in the last minute 1–0. After a short spell of 23 games and a £750,000 transfer fee the commanding defender Tiler followed his old Blades boss Howard Kendall to Everton, where he played the remainder of that season helping keep the Goodison Park outfit in the Premiership. Walter Smith took over the reins the following season and his first team appearances were limited. He scored his only goal for Everton in a 2–1 loss at Southampton on 7 March 1998.

In 1998 Tiler moved to Premiership side Charlton Athletic, again for £750,000. He played 47 games for the club and spent a brief period on loan at Birmingham City before in March 2001 signing for Graham Rix at Portsmouth for £250,000, where he stayed for a couple of seasons, scoring once in the league against Crystal Palace, before finally retiring from the game in 2003 due to injury. In his final season he contributed two appearances as Portsmouth won the First Division Championship and promotion to the Premier League.

== Honours ==
Nottingham Forest

- Football League Cup runners-up 1992
- Football League First Division runners-up: 1993–94

Aston Villa

- Football League Cup winners 1996

Charlton Athletic

- Football League First Division winners: 1999–2000

Portsmouth

- Football League First Division winners: 2002–2003
