= 2007 Setanta Sports Cup final =

The 2007 Setanta Sports Cup final took place at Windsor Park, Belfast on Saturday 12 May 2007 between Linfield and Drogheda United. It was the third Setanta Cup Final and the first to be played in Northern Ireland.

== Match details ==
12 May 2007
17:00 IST

Linfield (Northern Ireland)	1–1 (a.e.t.)	(Republic of Ireland) Drogheda United
McAreavey 67'	(Report)	Grant 77'
Penalties
Ervin (penalty scored); Mouncey (penalty scored); Ferguson (penalty scored); Dickson (penalty missed); O'Kane (penalty missed)	3–4	(penalty missed) Lynch; (penalty scored) Grant; (penalty scored) Bradley; (penalty scored) Robinson; (penalty scored) Byrne

Windsor Park, Belfast
Attendance: 7,700
Referee: Adrian McCourt (Northern Ireland)

GK	1	(Northern Ireland) Alan Mannus
DF	21	(Northern Ireland) Jim Ervin
DF	11	(Northern Ireland) Noel Bailie (c)
DF	5	(Northern Ireland) William Murphy
DF	3	(Northern Ireland) Pat McShane		(substituted off) 14'
MF	22	(Northern Ireland) Jamie Mulgrew		(substituted off) 93'
MF	15	(Northern Ireland) Mark Dickson
MF	14	(Northern Ireland) Paul McAreavey	(yellow card) 73'
MF	16	(Northern Ireland) Aidan O'Kane
FW	17	(Northern Ireland) Peter Thompson		(substituted off) 54'
FW	9	(Northern Ireland) Glenn Ferguson
Substitutes:
GK	18	(Northern Ireland) Greg Shannon
DF	2	(Northern Ireland) Steven Douglas
DF	19	(Northern Ireland) Tim McCann		(substituted on) 14'
MF	6	(Northern Ireland) Tim Mouncey		(substituted on) 93'
MF	4	(Northern Ireland) Michael Gault		(substituted on) 54'
FW	23	(Northern Ireland) Stephen Garret
FW	24	(Northern Ireland) Thomas Stewart
Manager:
(Northern Ireland) David Jeffrey Man of the Match:Alan Mannus (Linfield)

GK	23	(Finland) Mikko Vilmunen
DF	2	(Republic of Ireland) Damian Lynch	(yellow card) 5'
DF	6	(Republic of Ireland) Graham Gartland
DF	14	(Republic of Ireland) Brian Shelley
DF	3	(Republic of Ireland) Simon Webb		(substituted off) 59'
MF	7	(Republic of Ireland) Shane Robinson
MF	16	(Republic of Ireland) Stuart Byrne
MF	15	(Republic of Ireland) Stephen Bradley
MF	26	(Republic of Ireland) Ollie Cahill		(substituted off) 77'
FW	17	(Republic of Ireland) Éamon Zayed
FW	9	(Republic of Ireland) Declan O'Brien (c)		(substituted off) 59'
Substitutes:
GK	25	(Republic of Ireland) Cian Byrne
DF	4	(Republic of Ireland) Steven Gray		(substituted on) 59'
MF	8	(Republic of Ireland) Gavin Whelan
MF	18	(Republic of Ireland) Paul Keegan		(substituted on) 77'
MF	19	(Finland) Sami Ristila
FW	10	(Republic of Ireland) Glen Fitzpatrick
FW	12	(Republic of Ireland) Tony Grant		(substituted on) 59'
Manager:
(Republic of Ireland) Paul Doolin

== Trivia ==
- The two teams competing in the final, Linfield and Drogheda United, are the only teams to have won the competition previously.
- This was the first final played in Northern Ireland. The two previous finals were held in Tolka Park, Dublin.
- Linfield and Drogheda United have previously met three times in the history of the Setanta Cup. Each side has a win each; the other match was a draw.
- Drogheda United have won the Setanta Cup each time they have qualified for it.

== See also ==
- Setanta Sports Cup 2007
