= 2007 Setanta Sports Cup =

Tournament details
- Country: Northern Ireland; Republic of Ireland
- Teams: 8

Final positions
- Champions: Drogheda United (2nd title)
- Runners-up: Linfield

Tournament statistics
- Matches played: 27
- Goals scored: 67 (2.48 per match)

The 2007 Setanta Sports Cup was the 3rd staging of the Setanta Sports Cup, a cross-border cup competition that took place between football clubs from the Republic of Ireland and Northern Ireland. The final was played at Windsor Park in Belfast, Northern Ireland on 12 May 2007, and was won by Drogheda United with a 4-3 penalty shoot-out victory over Linfield when the scores were level at 1–1 after extra time. Drogheda won the trophy for the second successive year.

== Shelbourne's withdrawal ==
The draw for the 2007 Setanta Cup competition was made on 7 December 2006 with the original competing teams being the identical ones to the previous year's competition. On 30 January 2007, however, Shelbourne announced that they were withdrawing from the competition for reasons relating to their financial troubles and the fact that they would be unlikely to field a team of players. Their place was given to the 2006 FAI Cup runners-up to Derry City, St Patrick's Athletic, despite the fact that the next best-placed in the previous season's league (Shelbourne's qualification route), who did not have a place in the Setanta Cup already, were Sligo Rovers.

== Group stage ==
The draw for this round was held 7 December 2006. The matches were played 26 February-17 April 2007.

Teams that progressed to the Semi-Finals are indicated in bold type.

Teams eliminated from the Setanta Cup are indicated in italics.

=== Group A ===
Team	Pld	W	D	L	GF	GA	GD	Pts
1. (Northern Ireland) **Linfield**	6	3	3	0	8	5	+3	**12**
2. (Republic of Ireland) **Drogheda Utd**	6	3	2	1	5	2	+3	**11**
3. (Republic of Ireland) Derry City	6	1	2	3	6	8	-2	**5**
4. (Northern Ireland) Glentoran	6	1	1	4	4	8	-4	**4**

2007-02-26

Drogheda United	0 – 1	Linfield
	(Report)	O'Kane 29'

United Park, Drogheda

2007-02-26

Glentoran	0 – 1	Derry City
	(Report)	McHugh 85'

The Oval, Belfast
Attendance: 2,728
Referee: (Northern Ireland) Alan Black

2007-03-05

Linfield	1 – 1	Glentoran
Stewart 21'; Gault (red card) 90+'	(Report)	Hill 31'; Neill (red card) 90+'

Windsor Park, Belfast
Referee: (Republic of Ireland) Ian Stokes

2007-03-12

Derry City	0 – 0	Drogheda United
	(Report)

Brandywell, Derry

2007-03-19

Glentoran	0 – 1	Drogheda United
	(Report)	O'Keeffe 48'

The Oval, Belfast

2007-03-20

Linfield	2 – 1	Derry City
Dickson 20'; Kearney 45' (pen.); Lindsay (red card) 79'	(Report)	Farren 14'

Windsor Park, Belfast

2007-03-26

Derry City	2 – 2	Linfield
Beckett 35'; McCourt 60'	(Report)	O'Kane 74'; Dickson 85'

Brandywell, Derry

2007-03-26

Drogheda United	2 – 0	Glentoran
O'Keeffe 30'; Grant 45'	(Report)	Hill (red card) 35'

United Park, Drogheda

2007-04-02

Derry City	1 – 2	Glentoran
Brennan 16'	(Report)	McMenamin 54'; McDonagh 87'

Brandywell, Derry

2007-04-02

Linfield	0 – 0	Drogheda United
	(Report)

Windsor Park, Belfast

2007-04-17

Drogheda United	2 – 1	Derry City
Grant 69'; Zayed 90+'	(Report)	Deery 45'

United Park, Drogheda

2007-04-17

Glentoran	1 – 2	Linfield
Neill 42' (pen.)	(Report)	Stewart 7'; Thompson 55'

The Oval, Belfast

=== Group B ===
Team	Pld	W	D	L	GF	GA	GD	Pts
1. (Republic of Ireland) **St Patrick's Athletic**	6	5	1	0	17	3	+14	**16**
2. (Republic of Ireland) **Cork City**	6	3	1	2	14	5	+9	**10**
3. (Northern Ireland) Dungannon Swifts	6	0	4	2	6	12	-6	**4**
4. (Northern Ireland) Portadown	6	0	2	4	3	20	-17	**2**

2007-02-26

Dungannon Swifts	0 – 0	Cork City
	(Report)

Stangmore Park, Dungannon
Referee: (Northern Ireland) Frankie Hiles

2007-02-26

St Patrick's Athletic	3 – 0	Portadown
Ndo 41'; Kirby 47', 53'	(Report)

Richmond Park, Dublin

2007-03-05

Portadown	2 – 2	Dungannon Swifts
Collins 68'; McCutcheon 70'	(Report)	McCluskey 21'; Gallagher 90+3'

Shamrock Park, Portadown

2007-03-12

Cork City	1 – 3	St Patrick's Athletic
O'Flynn 85'	(Report)	O'Neill 32', 90+2' (pen.); Kirby 50'

Turners Cross, Cork

2007-03-19

Dungannon Swifts	2 – 2	St Patrick's Athletic
McAllister 4'; Everaldo 34'	(Report)	Kirby 19'; Fahey 49'

Stangmore Park, Dungannon

2007-03-20

Cork City	4 – 0	Portadown
O'Donovan 46', 76'; Lordan 60'; Lally 90'	(Report)

Turners Cross, Cork

2007-03-26

Portadown	0 – 7	Cork City
	(Report)	Behan 15', 82'; O'Flynn 18'; Gamble 32'; O'Donovan 44', 66', 87'

Shamrock Park, Portadown

2007-03-26

St Patrick's Athletic	5 – 0	Dungannon Swifts
Murphy 29'; Quigley 37'; O'Connor 46'; Kirby 57'; Brennan 61'	(Report)

Richmond Park, Dublin

2007-04-02

Dungannon Swifts	1 – 1	Portadown
McAree 37'	(Report)	Collins 80'

Stangmore Park, Dungannon

2007-04-02

St Patrick's Athletic	1 – 0	Cork City
Maguire 27'	(Report)

Richmond Park, Dublin
Referee: (Northern Ireland) Mark Courtney

2007-04-16

Cork City	2 – 1	Dungannon Swifts
O'Brien 4'; Behan 35'	(Report)	McCabe 64'; Wells (red card) 81'

Turners Cross, Cork
Referee: (Republic of Ireland) Declan Hanney

2007-04-16

Portadown	0 – 3	St Patrick's Athletic
	(Report)	Lynch 52'; O'Connor 62', 71'

Shamrock Park, Portadown

== Semi-finals ==
The draw for the semi-finals was made by drawing the winners of Group A against the runners-up of Group B and vice versa, with group winners having home advantage. There would be no replays if the matches were drawn; instead, extra time would decide winners immediately thereafter. If extra time did not decide the winners, a set of five alternating penalty kicks would decide winners.

23 April 2007
20:05 IST

St. Patrick's Athletic	0 – 1 (AET)	Drogheda United
	(Report)	Zayed 112'

Richmond Park, Dublin
Attendance: 2,735
Referee: Adrian McCourt (Northern Ireland)

30 April 2007
20:05 IST

Linfield	1 – 0	Cork City
O'Kane 85'	(Report)

Windsor Park, Belfast
Attendance: 2,647
Referee: Ian Stokes (Republic of Ireland)

== Final ==
12 May 2007
17:00 IST

Linfield	1 – 1 (AET)	Drogheda United
McAreavey 67'	(Report)	Lynch (penalty missed) 56'; Grant 77'
Penalties
Ervin (penalty scored); Mouncey (penalty scored); Ferguson (penalty scored); Dickson (penalty missed); O'Kane (penalty missed)	3 – 4	(penalty missed) Lynch; (penalty scored) Grant; (penalty scored) Bradley; (penalty scored) Robinson; (penalty scored) Byrne

Windsor Park, Belfast
Attendance: 7,700
Referee: (Northern Ireland) Adrian McCourt

Winner of 2007 Setanta Sports Cup
(Republic of Ireland) Drogheda United
2nd Title

== Goalscorers ==
5 goals

- (Republic of Ireland) Alan Kirby (St Patrick's Athletic)
- (Republic of Ireland) Roy O'Donovan (Cork City)

3 goals

- (Republic of Ireland) Denis Behan (Cork City)
- (Republic of Ireland) Tony Grant (Drogheda United)
- (Republic of Ireland) Sean O'Connor (St Patrick's Athletic)
- (Northern Ireland) Aidan O'Kane (Linfield)

2 goals

- (Northern Ireland) Michael Collins (Portadown)
- (Northern Ireland) Mark Dickson (Linfield)
- (Republic of Ireland) John O'Flynn (Cork City)
- (Republic of Ireland) Aidan O'Keeffe (Drogheda United)
- (Republic of Ireland) Gary O'Neill (St Patrick's Athletic)
- (Northern Ireland) Thomas Stewart (Linfield)
- (Libya) Éamon Zayed (Drogheda United)

1 goal

- (Republic of Ireland) Gary Beckett (Derry City)
- (Republic of Ireland) Killian Brennan (Derry City)
- (Republic of Ireland) Stephen Brennan (St Patrick's Athletic)
- (Republic of Ireland) Kevin Deery (Derry City)
- (Brazil) Everaldo (Dungannon Swifts)
- (Republic of Ireland) Keith Fahey (St Patrick's Athletic)
- (Republic of Ireland) Mark Farren (Derry City)
- (Northern Ireland) JP Gallagher (Dungannon Swifts)
- (Republic of Ireland) Joe Gamble (Cork City)
- (Northern Ireland) Jason Hill (Glentoran)
- (Northern Ireland) Oran Kearney (Linfield)
- (Republic of Ireland) Roy Lally (Cork City)
- (Republic of Ireland) Cillian Lordan (Cork City)
- (Republic of Ireland) Eamonn Lynch (St Patrick's Athletic)
- (Republic of Ireland) Darragh Maguire (St Patrick's Athletic)
- (Northern Ireland) Mark McAllister (Dungannon Swifts)
- (Northern Ireland) Paul McAreavey (Linfield)
- (Northern Ireland) Rodney McAree (Dungannon Swifts)
- (Northern Ireland) Shane McCabe (Dungannon Swifts)
- (Northern Ireland) Ryan McCluskey (Dungannon Swifts)
- (Northern Ireland) Paddy McCourt (Derry City)
- (Scotland) Gary McCutcheon (Portadown)
- (Republic of Ireland) Willo McDonagh (Glentoran)
- (Republic of Ireland) Kevin McHugh (Derry City)
- (Northern Ireland) BJ McMenamin (Glentoran)
- (Republic of Ireland) Anthony Murphy (St Patrick's Athletic)
- (Cameroon) Joseph Ndo (St Patrick's Athletic)
- (Northern Ireland) Kyle Neill (Glentoran)
- (Republic of Ireland) Colin O'Brien (Cork City)
- (Republic of Ireland) Mark Quigley (St Patrick's Athletic)
- (Northern Ireland) Peter Thompson (Linfield)
