= Alan Mannus =

Northern Irish footballer (born 1982)

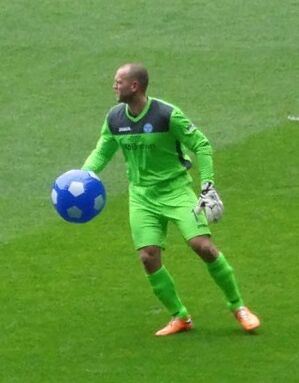
- Mannus playing for St Johnstone in 2014.

Personal information
- Full name: Alan Mannus
- Date of birth: 19 May 1982 (age 44)
- Place of birth: Toronto, Ontario, Canada
- Position: Goalkeeper

Team information
- Current team: Larne (Goalkeeping Coach)

Senior career*
Years	Team	Apps	(Gls)
2000–2009	Linfield	211	(1)
2000	→ Larne (loan)	1	(0)
2001	→ Carrick Rangers (loan)	9	(0)
2009–2011	Shamrock Rovers	69	(0)
2011–2018	St Johnstone	192	(0)
2018–2023	Shamrock Rovers	156	(0)
Total		638	(1)

International career
	Northern Ireland U16	3	(0)
2004	Northern Ireland U23	1	(0)
2004–2016	Northern Ireland	9	(0)
- * Club domestic league appearances and goals

Alan Mannus (born 19 May 1982) is a Northern Irish former professional footballer who played as a goalkeeper and is currently a goalkeeping coach for Larne. He began his career at Linfield, and during his time there he had spells on loan at Larne and Carrick Rangers. Mannus then signed for Shamrock Rovers and in 2011, moved to St Johnstone before finishing his career at Rovers in 2023. He has played for Northern Ireland at international level.

== Club career ==
=== Linfield ===
Mannus began his football career at Linfield at sixteen years old and rose up through the Linfield's junior ranks. At one point of his football career, he went on trial at Everton and Fulham but it was unsuccessful. Mannus was loaned out to Larne and made one appearance against Ards, in a 1–1 draw on 22 October 2000. He was then loaned out to Carrick Rangers, and made nine appearances for the side.

In the 2001–02 season, Mannus appeared as an unused substitute in the first qualifying round of the UEFA Champions League against Torpedo Kutaisi, as the club were eliminated from the tournament after losing 1–0 aggregate. On 24 October 2001, he made his debut for Linfield, starting the whole game, in a 3–0 win against Bangor. Following this, Mannus made his first senior squad appearance, becoming the club's first choice goalkeeper. He helped Linfield earn a place in the UEFA Cup after the club beat Omagh Town 3–2 on 28 April 2002. Mannus helped the club win the Irish Cup after beating Portadown win 2–1. After the match, he said: "This time last year I wasn't sure I would be kept on for this season, a month ago I was playing in the Swifts and now I've got an Irish Cup winners medal, it is unbelievable, a really brilliant feeling. I played two games last season and seven this season so it is a bit of a fairy tale for me." A few days later, Mannus helped Linfield Swifts win the Belfast Telegraph Intermediate Cup final to beat Donegal Celtic 1–0 to earn himself a double this season. He later reflected that the arrival of Tommy Wright (whom he reunited at St Johnstone) as the new goalkeeper coach changed everything.

Mannus later succeeded Robert Robinson as Linfield's first choice goalkeeper at a young age at the start of 2002–03 season. However, he played in both legs of the qualification round of UEFA Cup against Stabæk, as the club loss 5–1 on aggregate and was eliminated from the tournament. In a match against Glentoran on 25 September 2002, Mannus saved a penalty from Michael O'Neill, as Linfield drew 1–1. However, during a match against Glenavon on 23 October 2002, he suffered a thigh injury and was substituted in the 66th minute, as the club won 2–0. But Mannus returned to the starting line–up, in a 2–0 win against Crusaders on 8 December 2002. He then kept five consecutive clean sheets in the league between 8 February 2003 and 22 March 2003. Mannus then kept three consecutive clean sheets between 12 April 2003 and 22 April 2003. However, good performances over the 2002–03 season, the club failed to win a single trophy and finished fourth place in the league.

In the 2003–04 season, Mannus helped Linfield go on a six match unbeaten run in the group stage of the Irish League Cup. He then helped the club keep five consecutive clean sheets between 11 October 2003 and 1 November 2003. While trying to keep a clean sheet, Mannus is one of the few goalkeepers to have scored a goal in the run of play. In a match against Omagh Town in 2003, his long goal kick bounced over the head of opposing goalkeeper Gavin Cullen and into the net. As a result of scoring his first goal, he was given the Player of the Month award for October 2003. Mannus' performances proved to be crucial factor in the team's title contender. During a 3–1 win against Glentoran on 28 December 2003, he confronted and pushed the opposition player, Andy Smith in the aftermath of a second half incident and was fortunate to not get sent–off. Mannus helped the club reach the final of the County Antrim Shield after beating Glentoran 1–0. By February, he managed to keep eleven clean sheets in twenty matches so far in the 2003–04 season. Mannus started in the County Antrim Shield final, in a 2–0 win against Ards. He, once again, then kept six consecutive clean sheets in the league between 28 February 2004 and 18 April 2004. Mannus helped Linfield win the league championship after beating Glentoran 2–1 on 25 April 2004. For his performance, he was named Team of the Season by Belfast Telegraph. Mannus was nominated for the Northern Ireland Football Writers' Association Player of the Year but he lost out to teammate, Glenn Ferguson. At the end of the 2003–04 season, Mannus signed a two-year contract with the club.

At the start of the 2004–05 season, Mannus played in both legs of the first qualifying round of the UEFA Champions League, losing 2–0 on aggregate against HJK. Following Linfield's elimination from the tournament, he continued to help the club maintain their form to defend their league title. Mannus helped Linfield beat Cliftonville 2–1 in the Irish League Cup semi–finals. Prior to the final, he acknowledged the frustration of goals conceding since the start of the season. In the final, however, Mannus conceded two goals, as the club loss 2–1. The January transfer window of 2005 saw Mannus being mentioned as a transfer target for a number of clubs, being linked to Everton and Doncaster Rovers. He helped Linfield beat Kilmore Recreation 2–1 in the semi–finals of the County Antrim Shield to reach the final. Mannus started in the County Antrim Shield final against Crusaders and helped the club win 2–1 to win the trophy for the second time in a row. In a match against title contender Glentoran on 23 April 2005, he started on 150th appearance for Linfield, and despite playing through injury in a collision with his skipper Noel Bailie midway through the first half, the club went on to lose 3–2. In the last game of the season, the club unsuccessfully defended their league title after Glentoran won their game to crown the league's champions. Despite losing the league title, Mannus was in goal for the Setana Cup final against Shelbourne when Linfield won 2–0 to win the inaugural tournament. Once again, Mannus was named Team of the Season by Belfast Telegraph for the second time in a row.

At the start of the 2005–06 season, Mannus' performance against Rangers in a friendly match was praised by both managers, David Jeffrey and Alex McLeish, with suggestions that he should turn professional. He played in both legs of the first qualifying round of the UEFA Cup against FK Ventspils, as Linfield went through away goal. However, Mannus played in both legs of the second qualifying round of the UEFA Cup against Halmstads BK, as the club loss 5–3 on aggregate. Following Linfield's elimination from the tournament, he stated the club's aim was to win four trophies this season. Mannus helped the club dominate the league at the start of the season that saw them at the top of the table. He helped Linfield keep three consecutive clean sheets in the league between 22 October 2005 and 5 November 2005. On 10 December 2005, Mannus helped the club win their first trophy of the season by beating Glentoran 3–0 to win the Irish League Cup. The second half of the season saw him kept five consecutive clean sheets in the league between 2 January 2006 and 4 February 2006. He helped Linfield win their second trophy of the season by beating Ballymena United 2–1 to win the County Antrim Shield. By March, Mannus have started forty–seven matches for the club so far in the 2005–06 season. He later helped the club win their third trophy of the season by beating Armagh City 1–0 win to win the league title on 18 March 2006. Mannus helped Linfield win their fourth trophy of the season, successfully fulfilling his target by beating Glentoran 2–1 to win the Irish Cup. At the end of the 2005–06 season, he finished the season by making fifty–seven appearances, kept thirty–one clean sheets and conceded forty–one times.

In the 2006–07 season, Mannus played in both legs of the first qualifying round of the UEFA Champions League against ND Gorica, as Linfield loss 5–3 on aggregate. Following the club's elimination from the tournament, he made a warning to the Northern Irish teams that Linfield's form was blistering prior to the first league match of the season. The following month saw Mannus turned professional at Linfield, signing a three-year deal. He kept six consecutive clean sheets in the league between 21 October 2006 and 25 November 2006. Mannus said about getting six consecutive clean sheets, saying: "The reason we have done so well defensively is down to 11 players, not just me as the goalkeeper or the back four in front of me. I suppose I get a lot of attention because I am the goalkeeper and it is my job to keep the other team out, but it goes the other way too. When goals are being conceded I am the one everyone looks at, even if I feel that I am playing well at the time, so it is good to get praise as well. I do think that I am becoming a better goalkeeper." He made his 250th appearance for the club before his 25th birthday, coming against Drogheda United on 26 February 2007, which resulted in a 4–0 win in the group stage of Setanta Sports Cup. Mannus appeared in every match for Linfield until he missed one match, due to international duty. He made his return to the starting line–up in the quarter–finals replays of the Irish Cup against Ballymena United, as the club won 4–2 to advance to the semi–finals. Mannus helped Linfield win the league for the second time in a row by beating Glentoran 2–1 on 14 April 2007. He helped the club win the Irish Cup final after beating Dungannon Swifts on penalties following a 2–2 draw by saving three penalties spot kick. However, Mannus was unable to help Linfield win the treble after losing the Setanta Sports Cup final against Drogheda United on penalties, which he saved a penalty from Damian Lynch twice in the second half and in the penalty shootout.

In the 2007–08 season, Mannus played in both legs of the first qualifying round of the UEFA Champions League against IF Elfsborg, as Linfield loss 1–0 on aggregate. In the semi–finals of Irish Cup against Newry Town, he played all the way to the penalty shootout in a 1–1 draw and saved a penalty from Lee Feeney, as the club won 4–3 on penalties to reach the final. Mannus helped Linfield keep four consecutive clean sheets in the league between 24 November 2007 and 15 December 2007. He started in the Irish League Cup final, and helped the club to win 3–2 against Crusaders, winning his first trophy of the season. In the last game of the season, Mannus helped Linfield win the league title after the club win 3–0 win against Crusaders. A week later, on 3 May 2008, he started in the Irish Cup final against Coleraine and helped the club win 2–1 to win the tournament, marking the third trophy of the season. For his performance in April, Mannus was named the 2007–08 Ulster Footballer of the Year.

Ahead of the 2008–09 season, manager David Jeffrey said Linfield would not be selling Mannus in the summer transfer window. He played in both legs of the first qualifying round of the UEFA Champions League against IF Elfsborg, as Linfield loss 3–1 on aggregate. Despite having dental problems, Mannus started in goal for a match against Newry City, as the club won 1–0 on 23 August 2008. He followed up by keeping his second clean sheet of the season, in a 7–0 win against Institute. Following Linfield's poor form at the beginning of October, Mannus said his aim was to win another trophy this season. However, he turned down the offer of a new contract by Linfield. This led to interests from Scottish Premier League side Motherwell. Amid to his future at the club, Mannus kept three consecutive clean sheets in the league between 20 December 2008 and 1 January 2009. By January, Linfield's winning form saw them back at the top of the table. The following month saw Mannus conceded only two goals in all competitions for the club. On 27 April 2009, Linfield Manager David Jeffrey said he expected Mannus would leave the club and try to get a move to a club in England or Scotland. He made a comparison to Linfield's expectations to a robot, due to the club's never-ending demands and expectation that is placed on every player. However, Linfield's poor results eventually saw the club unsuccessfully their league title for the third in a row after surrendered it to Glentoran in the last game of the season.

During his career at Linfield, Mannus was a fan favourite among the club's supporters, having helped them win trophies, such as the Irish League/Irish Premier League, Irish League Cup and County Antrim Shield. At the end of his contract, he was linked with a move to Welsh side Swansea City and was reported to be training with Scottish Premier League side Falkirk. In July 2009, Mannus was given a trial with English League Two side Bradford City, but after playing three games without conceding a goal, he was released and returned home.

=== Shamrock Rovers ===
On 4 August 2009, Mannus signed for Shamrock Rovers on an 18–month contract.

Having spent two weeks becoming the second-choice goalkeeper behind Barry Murphy, he made his debut for Michael O'Neill's side in a 2–2 draw against Dundalk on 22 August 2009. Since joining Shamrock Rovers, Mannus quickly became the club's first choice goalkeeper. He then helped Shamrock Rovers keep three consecutive clean sheets in the league between 2 October 2009 and 17 October 2009. However, Mannus was unable to help the club secure the league title after a 1–1 draw against Galway United on 30 October 2009. At the end of the 2009 season, he made eleven appearances in all competitions.

Ahead of the 2010 season, Mannus officially became Shamrock Rovers' first choice goalkeeper following the departure of Murphy. After only collecting one point in the first three league matches, he made improvements on his mistakes and the club's results. Mannus helped Shamrock Rovers keep three consecutive clean sheets in the league between 9 April 2010 and 23 April 2010. Shortly after withdrawing from the Northern Ireland squad, he started in goal and helped the club beat UCD on 15 May 2010. In a match against St Patrick's Athletic on 5 July 2010, Mannus saved a penalty in the last minute of the game from Ryan Guy to keep the result in Rovers favour, winning 2–1. He played in both legs of the UEFA Europa League second qualifying round against Bnei Yehuda Tel Aviv and helped the club win 2–1 on aggregate to go through to the next round. Mannus then played in both legs of the UEFA Europa League third qualifying round against Juventus, as the club loss 3–0 on aggregate and was eliminated from the tournament. However, with Shamrock Rovers remaining in the title race, the club lost four of the five matches, including a 5–1 loss against Dundalk on 13 September 2010. But Mannus was able to improve the results in the remaining two league matches, winning against Drogheda United and drawing against Bray Wanderers, as he helped Shamrock Rovers win the League of Ireland for the first time since 1995. After winning his first title at the club, Mannus said he had no regrets about the move, even if it harmed his international career. In the FAI Cup final against Sligo Rovers, Mannus started and played 120 minutes without conceding a goal in a goalless draw, as the game went to penalty shootout when he didn't save a single penalty, resulting in Shamrock Rovers losing 2–0. At the end of the 2010 season, Mannus played in every match, as he went on to make fifty appearances in all competitions. Mannus was nominated for the PFAI Players' Player of the Year award in 2010, but he lost out to Richie Ryan of Sligo Rovers. Mannus was awarded the Soccer Writers Association of Ireland Goalkeeper of the Year Award for 2010. He was also named PFAI Team of the Year.

Ahead of the 2011 season, Mannus signed a contract extension with Shamrock Rovers. At the start of the season, he helped Shamrock Rovers keep four consecutive clean sheets in the league between 12 March 2011 and 1 April 2011. Mannus, once again, helped the club keep three consecutive clean sheets in the league between 6 May 2011 and 20 May 2011. In the Setanta Sports Cup final against Dundalk, he started the match and helped Shamrock Rovers win 2–0 to win the tournament. Despite suffering from a shoulder injury, Mannus started in the match against Athlone Town in third round of the FAI Cup, in a 4–0 win. In his final match for the club, he kept a clean sheet in a 0–0 draw away to Flora Tallinn on 19 July 2011, in the Champions League Second qualifying round second leg, winning 1–0 on aggregate to advance to the next round. By the time Mannus left Shamrock Rovers, he went on to make twenty–four appearances in all competitions. Even after leaving the club, Mannus received a medal after Shamrock Rovers won the league for the second time in a row.

=== St Johnstone ===
Mannus signed a one-year contract with Scottish Premier League side St Johnstone on 21 July 2011, after invoking a clause in his Shamrock Rovers contract that allowed him to leave if a British club made an offer after 20 July 2011.

Initially, Mannus was a back-up goalkeeper behind Peter Enckelman for seven months at St Johnstone. However, Enckelman conceded five goals against Dundee United on 11 February 2012, with two of the goals coming from his mistakes, led to manager Steve Lomas consider Mannus replacing Enckelman. He finally made his debut for the Saints, in the Scottish Cup fifth round replay against Hearts on 14 February 2012, as the club loss 2–1. In a follow–up match, Mannus made his league debut for St Johnstone, in a 0–0 draw against Aberdeen. Following this, he quickly dispatched the first choice goalkeeper role from Enckelman and helped the Saints improved on their results towards the end of the season. As a result of getting more playing time, Mannus said he believed playing first team football would help his international career. On 21 April 2012, Mannus signed a 12-month extension with the club. He later helped St Johnstone qualify for a place in Europe despite finishing sixth place.

At the start of the 2012–13 season, Mannus played in both legs of the UEFA Europa League second qualifying round against Turkish side Eskişehirspor, as St Johnstone went on to lose 4–1 on aggregate and was eliminated in the tournament. In a match against Celtic on 15 September 2012, he was a starter throughout the match, making a number of save and helped the Saints beat The Bhoys 2–1. In a match against Inverness Caledonian Thistle on 27 October 2012, Mannus saved a penalty from Andrew Shinnie before he set up the equalising goal for David Robertson, in a 1–1 draw. He then produced an in form save from Kenny McLean's free-kick and David van Zanten in a 1–1 draw against St Mirren on 8 December 2012. During a 2–0 loss against Aberdeen on 22 December 2012, Mannus produced " four or five great saves", which local newspaper, The Courier stated that "if it hadn't been for his heroics in goal, the scoreline could have been a lot worse than 2–0." After the match, he acknowledged is fault for not preventing to concede a goal from international teammate Niall McGinn, who went on to score twice during the match. In a 1–1 draw against Celtic on 20 February 2013, Mannus produced another good saves from Gary Hooper and Lassad Nouioui. In the last game of the season, he helped the club win 2–0 to seal third place finish in the league and qualify for Europe again. At the end of the 2012–13 season, Mannus made forty–one appearances in all competitions. For his performance, he signed another one-year contract with St Johnstone. For his performance, Mannus was awarded the Jailers Tours Player of the Year, SJFC Supporters' Bus Player of the Year and Barbosa Street Saints Player of the Year.

At the start of the 2013–14 season started well for Mannus, keeping a clean sheet as St Johnstone won 1–0 away to Norwegian side Rosenberg on 18 July 2013, in the Europa League second qualifying round first leg. Following a 1–1 draw in the second leg that saw the Saints advance to the next round through a 2–1 win on aggregate, he suggested in a post–match interview that Rosenberg had been "arrogant" and had underestimated St Johnstone. Mannus played in both legs in the UEFA Europa League third qualifying round against Minsk, where he kept a clean sheet in the first leg. In the return leg, he conceded a goal in the second leg that led to extra time and penalty shootout following a 1–1 draw on aggregate and despite saving two penalties, the club were eliminated on penalties. Following this, Mannus kept two clean sheets in the first two league matches of the season against Hearts and Kilmarnock. However, during a match against Kilmarnock, he sustained a shoulder injury and was out for six weeks. But Mannus made his return to training from his injury earlier than expected. He made his return from injury, starting the match, in a –1 loss against Hibernian on 14 September 2013. After the match, manager Tommy Wright praised Mannus' return. He helped St Johnstone keep three consecutive clean sheets in all competitions between 27 October 2013 and 2 November 2013. However, during a 3–3 draw against Hearts, on 18 January 2014, Mannus was sent-off, along with Ryan Stevenson after they were involved in an alteration "following an angry goalmouth melee". After the match, the Saints decided against appealing for his red card. While serving his suspension, he fractured a bone in his thumb and expected to keep him out for six to eight weeks. But two weeks later on 16 February 2014, Mannus returned to the starting line–up, in a 3–0 loss against Celtic. After the match, he said about his happiness of returning from injury, but stated: "I have a bit of metal that goes along my finger and I tape it and I have a spine as well that goes in the glove which holds my thumb in position. I feel like I could play without that but it's just to be sure." On 21 February 2014, Mannus signed a new one-year contract with the club, keeping him until 31 May 2015. In a match against Partick Thistle on 28 March 2014, he conceded a goal from Kris Doolan at the last minute of the game, resulting in a 1–1 draw. After the match, manager Tommy Wright defended Mannus, stating that he would bounce back from his mistake. In the semi–finals of the Scottish Cup against Aberdeen on 13 April 2014, Mannus started the match and helped St Johnstone win 2–1 to reach the Scottish Cup final. In the final against Dundee United, he started the match and produced several saves throughout the match, as the Saints won 2–0 to win the first major trophy in their 130-year history. At the end of the 2013–14 season, Mannus went on to make forty–four appearances in all competitions.

At the start of the 2014–15 season, Mannus played in both legs of the UEFA Europa League second qualifying round against Luzern, where the match eventually led to penalty shootout after a 2–2 draw on aggregate. He saved a penalty from Marco Schneuwly during a shoot-out as St Johnstone beat Luzern 5–4 in the shootout to advance to the next round. Mannus played in both legs of the UEFA Europa League second qualifying round against Spartak Trnava, as the Saints were eliminated from the Europa League. Following the Saints' poor form at the start of the season, he was able to help the Saints improve their results and then helped the club keep three consecutive clean sheets in the league between 6 December 2014 and 20 December 2014. Following this, Mannus said his target is to get more clean sheets for St Johnstone. In a match against Aberdeen on 1 January 2015, Mannus produced a number of saves, including a 25 yards save from Jonny Hayes, but he conceded two goals, as the Saints loss 2–0, ending the club's eight league match unbeaten run. After the match, manager Tommy Wright praised Mannus' performance as "outstanding". He then helped St Johnstone keep three consecutive clean sheets in the league between 21 February 2015 and 4 March 2015. With his contract expiring at the end of the season, Mannus's future was uncertain, leading the Saints to immediately start talks over a new contract. On 6 April 2015, he extended his contract with the club for a further two years, until 2017. Having been was an ever-present player throughout the 2014–15 season, Mannus helped St Johnstone beat Aberdeen 1–0 in the last game of the season to help the Saints qualify for the UEFA Europa League for the third year running. At the end of the 2014–15 season, he went on to make forty–six appearances in all competitions. For his performance, Mannus was awarded the We Are Perth Exiles 'Player of the Year' and George Gordon 'Clubman of the Year' at the club's award ceremony.

Ahead of the 2015–16 season, Mannus was expected to face competition from the returning keeper, Zander Clark. He started in the first leg of first qualifying round of the UEFA Europa League against FC Alashkert and conceded the only goal of the game, as St Johnstone lose 1–0. Prior to the match, Mannus said he's optimistic to help the Saints must improve on their result in the return leg. However, his words didn't help as Mannus was unable to help the club overturn the deficit, due to losing on away goal despite winning in the return leg. In the opening game of the season against Hearts, he gave away a penalty by bringing down Sam Nicholson in the penalty box, but saved a penalty from Osman Sow before Jamie Walker was quickest to the rebound, as St Johnstone went on to lose 4–3. In a match against Dundee United on 26 September 2015, Mannus received a straight red card in the 23rd minute for bring down Billy Mckay, as the Saints won 2–1. After the match, the club decided against appealing his red card and served a one match suspension. He returned to the starting line–up from suspension, in a 2–1 loss against Partick Thistle on 17 October 2015. After the match, Mannus said that he would maintain his form in hopes to be included in the UEFA Euro 2016 squad. After getting his first clean sheet of the season against Inverness Caledonian Thistle on 24 October 2015, Mannus also stated that he's determined to help St Johnstone get more clean sheets. Mannus captained the Saints for the first time in absence of Dave Mackay, in a 2–0 loss against Dundee on 12 February 2016. However, his form dipped when he was at fault for conceding four goals, losing both matches against Dundee United and Kilmarnock. As a result, Mannus was dropped as the Saints' first choice goalkeeper role in favour of Zander Clark. But he made his return to the starting line–up in the last game of the season, in a 2–2 draw against Hearts. At the end of the 2015–16 season, Mannus made thirty–nine appearances in all competitions.

Ahead of the 2016–17 season, Mannus was continuing to face competition from Zander Clark over the first choice goalkeeper role. He started two times in the Scottish League Cup group stage that saw St Johnstone through to the next round. Mannus helped the Saints beat Hearts 3–2 in the last 16 of the Scottish League Cup to go through to the next round. His performance against Celtic and Inverness Caledonian Thistle was praised despite losing both matches. However, he suffered an illness that led to him place on the substitute bench, with Zander Clark took over his duties as the club's first choice goalkeeper role for most of the season. Mannus appeared once for the rest of the 2016, starting the match, in a 4–2 loss against Ross County on 19 November 2016. He returned on 18 March 2017, making his first appearance since November, coming on as a second–half substitute for an injured Zander Clark, in a 2–1 win against Motherwell. Following this, Mannus regained his place as St Johnstone's first choice goalkeeper role for the rest of the season. On 29 April 2017, he made his 200th appearance for the Saints, in a 2–0 win against Aberdeen. His contributions saw the club qualify for the UEFA Europa League next season. At the end of the 2016–17 season, Mannus made seventeen appearances in all competitions. Following this, he signed a one–year contract extension with St Johnstone.

The 2017–18 season saw Mannus continuing to compete with Zander Clark over the first–choice goalkeeper role. He became a first–choice goalkeeper for the first ten league matches of the season. However, Mannus' form soon dipped, as St Johnstone's results have been poor. As a result, he was dropped to the substitute bench in favour of Zander Clark. Mannus returned on 29 January 2018, starting the whole game, in a 4–0 win against Albion Rovers in the fourth round of the Scottish Cup. Following this, he regained his first choice goalkeeper role for most of the second half of the season. In a match against Rangers on 27 February 2018, Mannus gave away a penalty in the 12th minute and was booked in the 12th minute, which was successfully converted by James Tavernier, as the Saints went on to lose 4–1. After the match, he criticised referee Steven McLean, stating that the decision to give away a penalty was a wrong call. On 17 April 2018, St Johnstone announced that Mannus would leave the club when his contract expires at the end of the 2017–18 season. After being dropped to the substitute bench in late–April, he made his last appearance for the club as captain against Ross County in the last game of the season, as the match ended in a 1–1 draw. At the end of the 2017–18 season, Mannus made twenty–five appearances in all competitions.

=== Shamrock Rovers ===
On 18 April 2018, Mannus signed a pre-contract with Shamrock Rovers, signing for the club for a second time, with the move due to be completed on 1 July 2018.

He made his second debut for the club, starting the whole game, and kept a clean sheet, in a 1–0 win against Waterford on 22 July 2018. In Mannus's first season back, he would go on to play every minute of their league campaign, having dispatched Gavin Bazunu as Shamrock Rovers' first choice goalkeeper role. Mannus kept five consecutive clean sheets in the league between 31 August 2018 and 12 October 2018. At the end of the 2018 season, he went on to make eleven appearances in all competitions.

Ahead of the 2019 season, Mannus stated that his aim was to win trophies, due to Shamrock Rovers' expectations. He helped the club keep five consecutive clean sheets in the league between 1 March 2019 and 22 March 2019. Mannus fully regained his first choice goalkeeper role at Shamrock Rovers following the departure of Gavin Bazunu. He helped the club keep three consecutive clean sheets in the league between 17 May 2019 and 24 May 2019. On 8 June 2019, Mannus made his 100th appearance for Shamrock Rovers, in a 2–2 draw against Derry City. He helped the club keep another three consecutive clean sheets in the league between 1 July 2019 and 21 July 2019. Mannus played in both legs of the UEFA Europa League first qualifying round against SK Brann and helped Shamrock Rovers go through to the next round by winning 4–3 on aggregate. However, he played in both legs of the UEFA Europa League first qualifying round against Apollon Limassol, as the club loss 4–3 on aggregate and was eliminated from the tournament. Mannus later helped Shamrock Rovers beat Bohemians in the semi–finals of the FAI Cup to reach the final. He kept four consecutive clean sheets in the remaining four league matches, as the club finished second. Mannus started in the final against Dundalk, as he played throughout 120 minutes following a 1–1 draw and helped Shamrock Rovers win on penalties, providing crucial saves in the shootout to lift the FAI Cup. The Irish Independent singled Mannus out for praise post-match for his goalkeeping performance during the match and also stated he should be remembered for the match, not for his choices pre-match. It came after when Mannus caused controversy when he refused to turn to face the flag of the Republic of Ireland during the anthem. In response, Mannus stated he did not intend to offend and only did not turn towards it because he is not Irish. At the end of the 2019 season, Mannus made forty–five appearances in all competitions. For his performance, he was named PFAI Team of the Year.

At the start of the 2020 season, Mannus helped Shamrock Rovers keep three consecutive clean sheets in the first three league matches. During a 3–2 win against Sligo Rovers on 7 March 2020, he was subjected of an alleged sectarian abuse made by the supporters of the opposition team. After the match, Mannus reported the abuse to referee and Football Association of Ireland. He started five times for the club before the season was suspended because of the COVID-19 pandemic. Once the season resumed behind closed doors, Mannus started the match and helped the club beat Finn Harps on 1 August 2020. He, once again, helped Shamrock Rovers keep three consecutive clean sheets in the league between 16 August 2020 and 5 September 2020. Mannus also made the crucial save in the club's epic 13–12 penalty shoot-out win over Ilves in the first qualifying round of UEFA Europa League. He helped Shamrock Rovers keep six consecutive clean sheets in remaining matches of the 2020 season and the club finished the season without losing a game. Mannus was part of the club's squad who won the League of Ireland for a record 18th time. He helped Shamrock Rovers beat Sligo Rovers 2–0 in the semi–finals of FAI Cup to reach the final. In the FAI Cup final, the club fell short and failed to achieve winning a double after losing 4–2 against Dundalk at extra time. At the end of the 2020 season, Mannus made twenty–two appearances in all competitions, having kept 13 clean sheets in 18 league games. For his performance, he was named Soccer Writers Association of Ireland Goalkeeper of the Year Award for 2020. Mannus also was named PFAI Premier Division Team of the Year. Having been contacted with Shamrock Rovers, he ruled out retirement and aimed to play beyond 40, having reiterated his claim earlier this year. Shortly after, Mannus signed a contract extension with the club.

At the start of the 2021 season, Mannus started the match in the President of Ireland's Cup against Dundalk, playing through extra time in a 1–1 draw and despite saving two penalties in the shootout, Shamrock Rovers loss 4–3. He continued to help the club go on an unbeaten in the first eleven matches. In a match against Sligo Rovers on 10 April 2021, Mannus was at fault when a shot from Walter Figueira slipped through his fingers, giving the opposition team the lead, as Shamrock Rovers went on to lose 1–1. After the match, manager Stephen Bradley defended Mannus' performance and believed that he will bounce back. The club's unbeaten run in the league came to an end on 21 May 2021 when they loss 2–1 against Dundalk. Mannus played both legs of the first qualifying round of the UEFA Champions League against Slovan Bratislava, which he saved a penalty in the first leg, as Shamrock Rovers loss 3–2 on aggregate and was relegated to the UEFA Europa Conference League. He kept a clean sheets in both legs of third qualifying round of the UEFA Europa Conference League against KF Teuta, as Shamrock Rovers won 3–0 on aggregate to advance to the next round. However, Mannus played in both legs of play–off round of the UEFA Europa Conference League and performed in the second leg, as the club loss 5–2 on aggregate against FC Flora and was eliminated from the tournament. After going on a three match losing streak, he improved his performance by helping Shamrock Rovers keep three consecutive clean sheets in the league between 10 September 2021 and 24 September 2021. On 29 October 2021, Mannus helped the club beat Finn Harps 3–0 to win the league for the second time in a row. At the end of the 2021 season, he went on to make forty–three appearances in all competitions. Following this, Mannus signed a one–year contract extension with Shamrock Rovers.

At the start of the 2022 season, Mannus started in the President of Ireland's Cup against St Patrick's Athletic, playing through extra time in a 1–1 draw and saved a penalty from Chris Forrester in the shootout, as Shamrock Rovers won 5–4 to win the match. He started in the first five league matches of the season, winning three times. However, Mannus missed one match due to an illness. But he made his return to the starting line–up, in a 2–2 draw against Sligo Rovers on 18 March 2022. Following this, he helped the club go on a thirteen match unbeaten run. Mannus played eight times in the both UEFA Champions League qualifying rounds and UEFA Europa League qualifying rounds that saw Shamrock Rovers qualify for the qualified for the group stages of the UEFA Europa Conference League for the first time. In a match against Derry City on 12 August 2022, he kept a clean sheet throughout the match and saved a penalty in the first half, as the club drew 0–0. In a follow–up match against Dundalk, Mannus kept another clean sheet and made a number of vital saves, including a second half free-kick from Keith Ward, as Shamrock Rovers won 3–0. After the match, his performance was praised by his teammate, Aaron Greene, calling him the best goalkeeper in the league. Manager Stephen Bradley believed that the player's form has been rejuvenated. For his performance, he was named the club's Player of the Month for August. On 17 October 2022, Mannus made his 200th appearance for Shamrock Rovers against Drogheda United and played 61 minutes before being substituted in the 61st minute, due to suffering from a knee injury. But he made a quick recovery in a follow–up match against St Patrick's Athletic and helped the club win 4–1. Three days later, on 24 October 2022, Shamrock Rovers were confirmed as champions to win their third league title in a row. Mannus started the match against Derry City on 30 October 2022 and kept a clean sheet, in a 1–0 win, as the club lifted the trophy. At the end of the 2022 season, he made forty–eight appearances in all competitions. Following this, Mannus signed a contract extension for another season with Shamrock Rovers. He also won the Soccer Writers Association of Ireland Goalkeeper of the Year Award for 2022.

The first two league matches of the 2023 season saw Mannus booked twice at the last minute, due to dissent. In a follow–up match against Derry City, he captained Shamrock Rovers, as the club loss 2–1. Mannus helped Shamrock Rovers keep three consecutive clean sheets in the league between 31 March 2023 and 10 April 2023. However, during a 2–0 win against Derry City on 1 May 2023, he suffered a dislocated finger injury and was substituted in the 61st minute. As a result, Mannus was out for two months with the injury. He returned on 27 July 2023 from his injury, starting the whole game, in a 4–0 loss against Ferencvárosi in the second qualifying round of the UEFA Europa Conference League. In the return leg, the club loss 2–0 and was eliminated from the tournament. Following his return from injury, Mannus regained his place as Shamrock Rovers' first choice goalkeeper role for the rest of the season. He helped the club keep four consecutive clean sheets in the league between 22 September 2023 and 27 October 2023. During that run, Mannus helped Shamrock Rovers beat Drogheda United 5–0 on 22 October 2023 to win the league for the fourth in a row, s in the league. At the end of the 2023 season, he went on to make twenty–five appearances in all competitions.

Mannus retired at the end of the 2023 League of Ireland Premier Division season with a record six League titles and a club record of 128 clean sheets in 285 appearances

== Post–playing career ==
In January 2023, Mannus was appointed as a goalkeeping coach educator for the Irish Football Association. On 14 August 2024, he returned to Linfield as their new goalkeeping coach. On 6 January 2025, Mannus was appointed as a goalkeeping coach for Larne, succeeding his former teammate, Alan Blayney.

== International career ==
Mannus was eligible to play for Canada (his birthplace) and Northern Ireland (his Northern Irish parents). Mannus represented Northern Ireland at various age levels. He helped Northern Ireland under–18 team win the Centenary Shield. In a December 2015 interview, Mannus revealed that prior to becoming cap tied to Northern Ireland no one from the Canadian FA had ever been in touch with him regarding representing Canada.

Having previously been called up to the Northern Ireland U21 in 2003, Mannus was called up to the Northern Ireland U23 squad in April 2004. He made his debut for the under–23, in a 0–0 draw against Serbia and Montenegro U23 on 28 April 2004. On 2 June 2004, Mannus was called up to the senior team as a last-minute replacement in the squad for the injured Michael Ingham. He won his first Northern Ireland cap against Trinidad and Tobago four days later on 6 June 2004.

Following this, Mannus was called up the Northern Ireland's squad on two occasions throughout 2007, but did not play. He returned to the starting line–up for Northern Ireland for the first time in four years, in a friendly match against Bulgaria on 8 February 2008, coming on as a second–half substitute, as the national side lose 1–0. A month later, on 25 March 2008, Mannus made another appearance for Northern Ireland, coming on as an 80th-minute substitute for Maik Taylor, in a 4–1 win in another friendly match against Georgia. He had to wait for another year on 6 June 2009 to make another appearance for the national side, in a 3–0 loss against the World Champions Italy. Following this, Mannus vowed that he's aims to become Northern Ireland's first choice goalkeeper. However, Mannus spent four years as a second–choice for the national side and was placed on the substitute bench, due to being overshadowed by Maik Taylor, Lee Camp and Roy Carroll. As a result, he felt being a second–choice goalkeeper for Northern Ireland left him frustrated. Mannus later criticised manager Nigel Worthington, claiming that Worthington had assured him that failure to travel on the tour would not harm his international chances after Alan Blayney, his successor at Linfield, played more matches for Northern Ireland than him. It came after in 2010 when he was called up to the national team squad. However, Mannus withdrew his name from the squad, which was subject of controversy.

Mannus finally made his first start for Northern Ireland against Malta on 6 February 2013 and helped the national side keep a clean sheet, in a 0–0 draw. He later made two more appearances for Northern Ireland, coming against Turkey and Cyprus, playing 45 minutes. Following this, Mannus returned to the substitute bench for the next two years. Due to his form at St Johnstone, he said his target was to dispatch Roy Carroll as Northern Ireland's first choice goalkeeper, especially ahead of the UEFA Euro 2016, but the target was unsuccessful. On 27 May 2016, Mannus made his first appearance for the national side in three years, coming on as a second–half substitute, in a 3–0 win against Belarus.

On 28 May 2016, Mannus was included by national team manager Michael O'Neill in Northern Ireland's final 23-man squad for UEFA Euro 2016. Upon being called up to the national team, he said it was an honour to be a part of the squad ahead of the tournament. However, Mannus was the third choice goalkeeper behind Michael McGovern throughout the tournament, as Northern Ireland was eliminated in the last 16. Despite this, he said it was a great experience to be in the squad for the national team. Mannus made another appearance for Northern Ireland, starting the whole game, in a 3–0 loss against Croatia on 15 November 2016.

Following this, Mannus remained on the substitute bench throughout 2017, including Northern Ireland's elimination in the 2018 FIFA World Cup qualification against Switzerland. After the national team's unsuccessful qualification for the World Cup, he announced his retirement from international football.

== Personal life ==
Born in Mississauga, Ontario, Mannus lived in Canada until his parents moved back to Northern Ireland, where he was raised in Carryduff in the north of County Down. His brothers live in Northern Ireland. Ian played mostly with Sirocco Works and Toby plays rugby, most notably for Belfast based Cooke Rugby Club. But his brother, Paul, have since moved back to Canada. Prior to getting a professional contract, Mannus worked as a fitness instructor. Both Alan and Ian played against each other in a 3–3 draw between Linfield and Glentoran on 1 March 2006.

Growing up, Mannus was a boyhood Rangers supporters and first played against the Gers, in a 3–0 loss on 30 July 2003, which he said it was a great experience. Mannus also attended Dunmurry High School. During his time at Linfield, Mannus earned a nickname, Job, due to his patience. As a teenager, he took up mixed-martial arts but stopped it in order to concentrate on football and would have taken it up as a career if his football career didn't go full time.

In the summer of 2015, Mannus married his long–term partner, Leanne. Together, they have two children.

Mannus revealed that he has an engineering degree from Queen's University and planned on getting a coaching license once his playing career comes to an end. The Irish Independent described Mannus as a " Northern Irish Protestant who identifies as British."

== Honours ==
Linfield

- Irish League/Irish Premier League: 2003–04, 2005–06, 2006–07, 2007–08
- Irish Cup: 2001–02, 2005–06, 2006–07, 2007–08
- Irish League Cup: 2005–06, 2007–08
- County Antrim Shield: 2000–01, 2003–04, 2004–05, 2005–06
- Setanta Cup: 2005

Shamrock Rovers

- League of Ireland Premier Division (6): 2010, 2011, 2020, 2021, 2022, 2023
- FAI Cup: 2019
- Setanta Cup: 2011
- President of Ireland's Cup: 2022

St Johnstone

- Scottish Cup: 2013–14

=== Individual ===
- Ulster Footballer of the Year: 2007–08
- SWAI Goalkeeper of the Year: 2010, 2020, 2022
- League of Ireland Premier Division Most cleansheet: 2022
- PFAI Premier Division Team of the Year (1): 2010, 2020
