= Simon Webb (footballer) =

Irish footballer

Personal information
- Full name: Simon Webb
- Date of birth: 19 January 1978 (age 48)
- Place of birth: County Mayo, Ireland
- Position: Left back

Youth career
- Tottenham Hotspur

Senior career*
Years	Team	Apps	(Gls)
1996–2000	Tottenham Hotspur	0	(0)
1999–2000	→ Leyton Orient (loan)	4	(0)
2000	Purfleet	?	(?)
2000–2004	Bohemians	?	(5)
2005–2008	Drogheda United	?	(1)
- * Club domestic league appearances and goals

Simon Webb (born 19 January 1978 in County Mayo) is an Irish retired footballer.

A trainee with Tottenham Hotspur from August 1994, Simon went on loan to Leyton Orient in October 1999. He signed for Bohemians from Purfleet in July 2000 where he won two league winning medals (2000/01 and 2002/03) and a FAI Cup winners medal (2001). He was sent off in the 2002 FAI Cup Final as Bohemians were beaten 2–1 by Dundalk .

At the end of the 2004 season, Webb moved along with Damian Lynch to Drogheda United. He has become a regular fixture in the side, captaining the side on occasions and has added to his collection of medals by winning the FAI Cup in 2005 and the Setanta Cup in 2006 and 2007.

He retired in January 2008.

Webb played for the Republic of Ireland national under-19 football team in the 1996 UEFA European Under-18 Football Championship finals in Luxembourg.

== Honours ==
Bohemians

- League of Ireland (2): 2000-01, 2002-03
- FAI Cup (1): 2001

Drogheda United

- League of Ireland (1): 2007
- FAI Cup (1): 2005
- Setanta Sports Cup (2): 2006, 2007
