= Willo =

Willo is a given name. Notable people with the name include:

- Willo Davis Roberts (1928–2004), American writer of children's novels
- Willo Flood (born 1985), Irish footballer
- Willo McDonagh (born 1983), Irish footballer

== See also ==
- Willo the Wisp, British cartoon series originally produced in 1981
- Willo, a specimen of the dinosaur Thescelosaurus falsely thought to have had a fossilised heart.
