= Everaldo =

Everaldo is a given name. It may refer to:

- Everaldo (footballer, 1944–1974), Everaldo Marques da Silva, Brazilian football left-back
- Everaldo Anunciação (1960–2025), Brazilian politician
- Everaldo Costa Azevedo (born 1944), Brazilian boxer
- Everaldo (footballer, born 1949), Everaldo Ferreira de Lima, Brazilian football forward
- Everaldo Pereira (born 1956), Brazilian pastor, businessman and politician
- Everaldo (footballer, born 1963), Everaldo Aparecido Rogério, Brazilian football defender
- Everaldo Matsuura (born 1970), Brazilian chess player
- Everaldo Begines (born 1971), Mexican football manager and former forward
- Everaldo (footballer, born 1974), Everaldo Batista Veveu, Brazilian football centre-back
- Everaldo dos Santos (born 1974), Brazilian football forward
- Everaldo Barbosa (born 1975), Brazilian football midfielder
- Everaldo Coelho (born 1978), Brazilian graphic designer
- Everaldo de Jesus Pereira (born 1980), known as Cabore, Brazilian football forward
- Everaldo Ferreira (born 1982), Brazilian football striker
- Everaldo (footballer, born 1991), Everaldo Stum, Brazilian football striker
- Everaldo (footballer, born 1994), Everaldo Silva do Nascimento, Brazilian football winger
