= Michael Collins =

Michael Collins or Mike Collins most commonly refers to:

- Michael Collins (Irish leader) (1890–1922), Irish revolutionary and politician
- Michael Collins (astronaut) (1930–2021), American astronaut, member of Apollo 11 and Gemini 10 crews

It may also refer to:

== Arts and entertainment ==
- Michael Collins (English actor) (1922–1979), English television actor
- Michael Collins (American author) (a.k.a. Dennis Lynds, 1924–2005), American mystery writer
- Michael Collins (writer and broadcaster) (born 1961), British author, journalist and television presenter
- Mike Collins (comics) (born 1961), British-born American comic book artist
- Michael Collins (Irish author) (born 1964), Irish novelist
- Mick Collins (born 1965), American musician
- Michael Knost (a.k.a. Michael Earl Collins, born 1967), American horror fiction writer
- Michael Collins (Irish actor) (born 1966), Irish actor
- Deathlok (a.k.a. Michael Collins), Marvel comics character
- Michael Collins (clarinetist) (born 1962), British clarinetist

== Politics and law ==
=== Ireland ===
- Michael Collins (Limerick politician) (1940–2022), Irish politician (Fianna Fáil, later independent)
- Michael Collins (Dublin politician) (fl. 1970s), Irish politician, Lord Mayor of Dublin
- Michael Collins (politician, born 1968) (born 1968), Irish politician, Cork South–West TD (originally independent, now Independent Ireland party)

=== United States ===
- Michael F. Collins (1854–1928), American newspaper publisher and politician
- D. Michael Collins (1944–2015), American politician, Mayor of Toledo, Ohio
- Mike Collins (politician) (born 1967), American politician from the state of Georgia

== Science and technology ==
- Michael Collins (computational linguist) (born 1971), British-born researcher in computer science
- Michael Patrick Collins, Canadian structural engineer

== Sports ==
=== Association football (soccer) ===
- Michael Collins (soccer) (born 1961), American soccer midfielder
- Michael Collins (footballer, born 1977), Irish footballer
- Michael Collins (footballer, born 1986), Irish and Oxford United professional footballer

=== Rugby ===
- Michael Collins (rugby union, born 1974), New Zealand rugby union player, coach and administrator
- Michael Collins (rugby union, born 1986), Welsh rugby union player
- Michael Collins (rugby union, born 1993), New Zealand rugby union player

=== Other sports ===
- Mike Collins (American football) (born 1960), American college football coach at the University of Louisiana
- Michael Collins (1879–1959), discus thrower at the 1908 Summer Olympics
- Mike Collins (Australian footballer, born 1939), Australian rules VFL footballer for Melbourne in the 1960s
- Mike Collins (Australian footballer, born 1953), Australian rules VFL footballer for Melbourne in the 1970s
- Michael Collins (baseball) (born 1984), Australian baseball player
- Michael Collins (boxer) (fl. 1980s), American boxer
- Michael Collins (cricketer) (born 1958), South African cricketer
- Michael Collins (hurler) (1940–2009), Irish hurler
- Mike Collins (ice hockey) (born 1990), American ice hockey player
- Michael Collins (referee), Gaelic football referee
- Mike Collins (tennis) (born 1951), British tennis player

== Others ==
- Michael Collins (bishop) (1771–1832), Roman Catholic Bishop of Cloyne and Ross
- Michael Collins (diplomat) (born 1953), Irish diplomat

== Other uses ==
- Michael Collins (film), 1996 film
  - Michael Collins (soundtrack)
- Michael Collins (Irish whiskey), Irish whiskey brand

== See also ==
- Michael Collings (disambiguation)
