= 2004–05 Sheffield United F.C. season =

Sheffield United
2004–05 season
- Chairman: Derek Dooley
- Manager: Neil Warnock
- Stadium: Bramall Lane
- Football League Championship: 8th
- FA Cup: Fifth round
- League Cup: Third round
- Top goalscorer: League: Gray (15); All: Gray (18)
- Highest home attendance: 27,595 (vs. Arsenal, 1 March)
- Lowest home attendance: 5,399 (vs. Stockport County, 24 August)
- Average home league attendance: 19,594

During the 2004–05 English football season, Sheffield United competed in the Football League Championship.

== Season summary ==
In 2004–05 season, Warnock once again brought in a host of new faces with the pick being arguably the signings of former Sheffield Wednesday players Bromby, Quinn and Geary. The Blades again flirted around the play-offs places but some inconsistent performances, which included only winning 5 of their last 20 Championship games, saw the club again fall just short of the top six.

== Final league table ==
Pos	Team	Pld	W	D	L	GF	GA	GD	Pts	Promotion, qualification or relegation
6	West Ham United (O, P)	46	21	10	15	66	56	+10	73	Qualification for Championship play-offs
7	Reading	46	19	13	14	51	44	+7	70	
8	Sheffield United	46	18	13	15	57	56	+1	67	
9	Wolverhampton Wanderers	46	15	21	10	72	59	+13	66	
10	Millwall	46	18	12	16	51	45	+6	66	

Updated to match(es) played on 9 December 2011. Source: Football League Tables
Rules for classification: 1) points; 2) goal difference; 3) number of goals scored.
(O) Play-off winners; (P) Promoted

== Results ==
Sheffield United's score comes first

=== Legend ===
Win	Draw	Loss

=== Football League Championship ===
Date	Opponent	Venue	Result	Attendance	Scorers
7 August 2004	Burnley	A	1–1	16,956 (3,607 away)	Gray
10 August 2004	Stoke City	H	0–0	19,723 (810 away)	
14 August 2004	Reading	H	0–1	22,429 (735 away)	
20 August 2004	Preston North End	A	1–0	12,084 (768 away)	Gray
28 August 2004	Leeds United	H	2–0	22,959 (3,325 away)	Ward, Harley
31 August 2004	Queens Park Rangers	A	1–0	13,804 (840 away)	Gray
11 September 2004	West Ham United	H	1–2	21,058 (2,284 away)	Quinn
14 September 2004	Leicester City	A	2–3	23,422 (1,729 away)	Morgan, Forte
18 September 2004	Wigan Athletic	A	0–4	10,682 (2,257 away)	
25 September 2004	Coventry City	H	1–1	16,337 (793 away)	Black
28 September 2004	Sunderland	H	1–0	17,908 (2,211 away)	Shaw
2 October 2004	Brighton & Hove Albion	A	1–1	6,418 (590 away)	Shaw
17 October 2004	Gillingham	A	3–1	6,964 (448 away)	Shaw (2), Tonge
19 October 2004	Nottingham Forest	H	1–1	19,445 (2,183 away)	Liddell
23 October 2004	Plymouth Argyle	H	2–1	18,893 (1,375 away)	Bromby, Gray
29 October 2004	Crewe Alexandra	A	3–2	7,131 (1,049 away)	Harley, Gray, Cadamarteri
2 November 2004	Ipswich Town	A	1–5	22,977 (468 away)	Bromby
6 November 2004	Gillingham	H	0–0	16,598 (349 away)	
13 November 2004	Watford	H	1–1	18,454 (709 away)	Quinn
20 November 2004	Derby County	A	1–0	25,725 (2,612 away)	Quinn
27 November 2004	Wolverhampton Wanderers	H	3–3	18,946 (2,463 away)	Bromby, Thirlwell, Shaw
4 December 2004	Millwall	A	2–1	11,207 (648 away)	Liddell, Geary
11 December 2004	Rotherham United	A	2–2	8,195 (2,823 away)	Tonge, Shaw
18 December 2004	Cardiff City	H	2–1	18,240 (662 away)	Liddell, Gray
26 December 2004	Coventry City	A	2–1	21,146 (3,313 away)	Morgan, Gray
28 December 2004	Leicester City	H	2–0	22,100 (1,758 away)	Gray, Quinn
1 January 2005	Wigan Athletic	H	0–2	21,869 (1,207 away)	
3 January 2005	West Ham United	A	2–0	27,424 (1,245 away)	Řepka (own goal), Bromby
15 January 2005	Brighton & Hove Albion	H	1–2	21,482 (1,133 away)	Mayo (own goal)
22 January 2005	Sunderland	A	0–1	27,337 (1,437 away)	
5 February 2005	Ipswich Town	H	0–2	20,680 (2,528 away)	
22 February 2005	Plymouth Argyle	A	0–3	13,953	
26 February 2005	Rotherham United	H	1–0	18,431 (1,687 away)	Shaw
5 March 2005	Cardiff City	A	0–1	12,250 (421 away)	
8 March 2005	Crewe Alexandra	H	4–0	16,079 (180 away)	Kabba (2), Gray (2)
12 March 2005	Stoke City	A	0–2	17,019	
15 March 2005	Preston North End	H	1–1	18,647 (1,134 away)	Bromby
19 March 2005	Burnley	H	2–1	19,374 (1,218 away)	Quinn, Gray
2 April 2005	Reading	A	0–0	18,899	
5 April 2005	Leeds United	A	4–0	28,936	Webber, Montgomery, Gray (2)
9 April 2005	Queens Park Rangers	H	3–2	20,426	Webber (2), Gray (pen)
12 April 2005	Nottingham Forest	A	1–1	21,903	Quinn
15 April 2005	Derby County	H	0–1	20,794	
23 April 2005	Watford	A	0–0	17,138	
30 April 2005	Millwall	H	0–1	19,797	
8 May 2005	Wolverhampton Wanderers	A	2–4	27,454 (1,710 away)	Quinn, Gray

=== FA Cup ===
Round	Date	Opponent	Venue	Result	Attendance	Goalscorers
R3	8 January 2005	Aston Villa	H	3–1	14,003 (2,483 away)	Cullip, Liddell (2)
R4	29 January 2005	West Ham United	A	1–1	19,444 (2,687 away)	Jagielka
R4R	13 February 2005	West Ham United	H	1–1 (won 3–1 on pens)	15,067	Liddell
R5	19 February 2005	Arsenal	A	1–1	36,891	Gray (pen)
R5R	1 March 2005	Arsenal	H	0–0 (lost 2–4 on pens)	27,595 (1,990 away)	

=== League Cup ===
Round	Date	Opponent	Venue	Result	Attendance	Goalscorers
R1	24 August 2004	Stockport County	H	4–1	5,399 (492 away)	Morgan, Cutler (own goal), Tonge, Lester
R2	21 September 2004	Wrexham	A	3–2	3,423 (386 away)	Gray (2), Jagielka
R3	26 October 2004	Watford	H	0–0 (lost 2–4 on pens)	7,689 (484 away)	

== Players ==
=== First-team squad ===
Squad at end of season

Note: Flags indicate national team as defined under FIFA eligibility rules; some limited exceptions apply. Players may hold more than one non-FIFA nationality.

No.	Pos.	Nation	Player
1	GK	IRL	Paddy Kenny (Note: Kenny was born in Halifax, England, but also qualified to represent the Republic of Ireland internationally through his parents and made his international debut for the Republic of Ireland in June 2004.)
2	DF	ENG	Rob Kozluk
3	DF	ENG	Alan Wright
4	MF	SCO	Nick Montgomery (Note: Montgomery was born in Leeds, England, but also qualified to represent Scotland internationally and represented them at U-21 level.)
5	DF	ENG	Chris Morgan
6	DF	ENG	Phil Jagielka
7	FW	SCO	Andy Liddell (Note: Liddell was born in Leeds, England, but also qualified to represent Scotland internationally through his father and represented them at U-21 level.)
8	FW	SCO	Andy Gray (Note: Gray was born in Harrogate, England, but also qualified to represent Scotland internationally through his father and made his international debut for Scotland in April 2003.)
9	FW	ENG	Ashley Ward
10	FW	ENG	Danny Cadamarteri
11	FW	JAM	David Johnson (Note: Johnson was born in Kingston, Jamaica, but also qualified to represent any of the home nations internationally under FIFA guidelines as he held a British passport and represented England at B level before making his international debut for Jamaica in March 1999. He would later be called up by Wales, Scotland, and Northern Ireland, but was only eligible to represent England due to an agreement between the home nations.) (on loan from Nottingham Forest)
12	MF	IRL	Alan Quinn
13	GK	ENG	Phil Barnes
14	DF	ENG	Jon Harley
15	MF	ENG	Paul Thirlwell
16	DF	ENG	Simon Francis
17	DF	ENG	Leigh Bromby

No.	Pos.	Nation	Player
18	MF	ENG	Michael Tonge
19	FW	ENG	Steve Kabba
20	DF	ENG	Chris Armstrong
21	FW	ENG	Jonathan Forte (Note: Forte was born in Sheffield, England, and represented them at U-16, U-17, and U-18 level, but also qualified to represent Barbados internationally through his father and would make his international debut for Barbados in March 2010.)
22	MF	ENG	Ian Ross
23	MF	ENG	Kevan Hurst
24	MF	SCO	Stuart McCall (Note: McCall was born in Leeds, England, but also qualified to represent Scotland internationally through his parents and represented them at U-21 level before making his international debut for Scotland in March 1990.)
25	FW	ENG	Danny Webber (on loan from Watford)
26	DF	IRL	Derek Geary
27	MF	IRL	Adrian Harper
28	FW	ENG	Billy Sharp
44	FW	ENG	Daniel Ebbutt
29	FW	ENG	Luke Beckett
30	FW	ENG	Paul Shaw
32	DF	ENG	Danny Cullip
33	GK	ENG	Danny Haystead
34	FW	ENG	Tommy Johnson

=== Left club during season ===
Note: Flags indicate national team as defined under FIFA eligibility rules; some limited exceptions apply. Players may hold more than one non-FIFA nationality.

No.	Pos.	Nation	Player
10	FW	JAM	Barry Hayles (Note: Hayles was born in Lambeth, England, but also qualified to represent Jamaica internationally and made his international debut for Jamaica in June 2001, having previously represented the Cayman Islands internationally despite being ineligible to do so.) (to Millwall)
11	FW	ENG	Jack Lester (to Nottingham Forest)
25	DF	ITA	Emanuele Gabrieli (released)

No.	Pos.	Nation	Player
29	MF	ENG	Tommy Black (on loan from Crystal Palace)
31	GK	ENG	Ian Bennett (on loan from Birmingham City)
—	MF	ENG	Ashley Sestanovich (released)

== Transfers ==
=== In ===
- Jon Harley - Fulham, 21 June, free
- Barry Hayles - Fulham, 23 June, free
- Leigh Bromby - Sheffield Wednesday, 23 June, free
- Alan Quinn - Sheffield Wednesday, 23 June, free
- Andy Liddell - Wigan Athletic, 23 June
- Phil Barnes - Blackpool, 25 June, free
- Paul Thirlwell - Sunderland, 27 July, free
- Danny Cadamarteri - Leeds United, 30 September, £50,000
- Emanuele Gabrieli - 30 September, free
- Derek Geary - Stockport County, 22 October, £25,000
- David Johnson - Nottingham Forest, 10 March, loan
- Luke Beckett - Stockport County, November, £50,000
- Danny Cullip - Brighton & Hove Albion, 17 December, £250,000
- Tommy Johnson - Gillingham
- Danny Haystead
- Adrian Harper

=== Out ===
- Mark Rankine - Tranmere Rovers, 3 June, free
- Wayne Allison - Chesterfield, 25 June, free
- Rob Page - Cardiff City, 2 July, free
- Andy Parkinson - Grimsby Town, July, free
- Kristian Rogers - Worksop Town
- Peter Ndlovu - Mamelodi Sundowns
- Colin Cryan - Scarborough
- Mike Whitlow - Notts County
- Dries Boussatta - Al-Shaab
- Danny Wood
- Dominic Roma
- Sasa Ilic
- Ben Purkiss
- Barry Hayles - Millwall
- Jack Lester - Nottingham Forest
- Emanule Gabrieli - released
- Ashley Sestanovich - Chester City
- Danny Reet - Sheffield Wednesday

=== Loans in ===
- Tommy Black - Crystal Palace, December, loan
- Danny Webber - Watford, 24 March, loan
- Ian Bennett - Birmingham City, loan

=== Loans out ===
- Paul Shaw - Rotherham United, loan
- Ashley Sestanovich - Grimsby Town, free
- Evan Horwood - Stockport County, 11 March, loan
- Colin Marrison - Leigh RMI, 11 March, work experience
- Jake Speight - Leigh RMI, 11 March, work experience
- Luke Beckett - Huddersfield Town, 18 March, loan
- Danny Cullip - Watford, 24 March, loan
