= James Ervin =

James Ervin may refer to:

- James Ervin (politician) (1778–1841), U.S. Representative from South Carolina
- Sam J. Ervin IV (born 1955), also known as Jimmy Ervin, American lawyer and jurist
- Jim Ervin (footballer), Irish footballer in 2007 Setanta Sports Cup Final

== See also ==
- James Irvine (disambiguation)
