= Tony Grant (Irish footballer) =

Irish footballer (born 1976)

Personal information
- Date of birth: 20 August 1976 (age 50)
- Place of birth: Drogheda, Republic of Ireland
- Position: Forward

Team information
- Current team: Duleek

Youth career
- 1994–1995: Leeds United

Senior career*
Years	Team	Apps	(Gls)
1995–1996	Preston North End	1	(0)
1997–2000	Glenavon	119	(48)
2000–2003	Shamrock Rovers	112	(34)
2004–2006	Bohemians	68	(17)
2006–2008	Drogheda United	30	(1)
2008–2011	Glenavon	94	(25)
2012	Glenavon	6	(1)
Total		430	(126)
- * Club domestic league appearances and goals

Tony Grant (born 20 August 1976) is an Irish professional footballer who last played for Duleek.

== Career ==
=== Early years ===
Starting as a trainee with Leeds United, Grant signed for Preston North End in November 1995. He was loaned out to Glenavon, making a permanent move to the Lurgan club in January 1997; he scored the only goal in their Irish Cup final win over Cliftonville the same year. This guaranteed entry to the 1997–98 UEFA Cup Winners' Cup where Grant scored against Legia Warsaw

=== League of Ireland ===
Grant signed for Shamrock Rovers in the summer of 2000 and scored on his debut for the club in August of that year. He was presented with the Player of the Year award at the end of his first season with the club. During his career with the "Hoops", he scored several decisive goals against rivals, Bohemians, including the only goal in Dalymount Park's centenary game and a back-heeled winner in another 2001 derby, at Richmond Park. Grant scored the winning goal for Rovers in the 2003 UEFA Intertoto-Cup tie with Odra Wodzisław in Poland. He made a total of 6 appearances in European Competition for Shamrock Rovers.

On 24 February 2004, Bohemians announced the signing of Grant and James Keddy from Shamrock Rovers. Less than two months later, the two clubs played each other at Dalymount Park. The game finished 2–2 but was marked by a Pig's head being thrown onto the pitch by Rovers supporters, in a gesture aimed at Grant in particular. The incident remained a topic of humour amongst the media for weeks after, as well as a reminder of the intensity of the rivalry between the two clubs.

Grant suffered at first with several niggling injuries during his time with Bohemians, but won back his place in October 2004. In June 2005 he scored another winner in the UEFA Intertoto Cup.

Grant signed for Drogheda United in 2006 making his debut in the UEFA Cup away to HJK Helsinki in Finland. Injury brought his first season to an early end.

He started the 2007 season quite well scoring four goals in twenty appearances, fourteen of these appearances were as a substitute. One of those four goals happened to be the equaliser in the 2007 Setanta Cup Final.

=== Later years ===
In the summer of 2008 Grant rejoined Glenavon. He played for three seasons here with fellow Dublin men Adrian Harper and Trevor Molloy. He was released by the club in May 2011 at the end of his contract and signed with Leinster Senior League side Glebe North↵He was then re-signed by Glenavon on 4 January 2012.

== Honours ==
=== Team ===
Drogheda United

- League of Ireland: 2007.
- Setanta Cup: 2007.

Glenavon

- Irish Cup: 1996–97.

=== Individual ===
- Shamrock Rovers F.C. Player of the Year: 2000–01.
