= Michael Collings =

Michael Collings may refer to:

- Michael R. Collings (born 1947), American poet and literary critic
- Mike Collings (born 1954), New Zealand sport shooter

== See also ==
- Michael Collins (disambiguation)
