= Aidan O'Keeffe =

Irish footballer

Personal information
- Date of birth: March 22, 1982 (age 44)
- Place of birth: Navan, Ireland
- Position: Midfielder

Youth career
- St Patrick's Athletic

Senior career*
Years	Team	Apps	(Gls)
2001–2005	St Patrick's Athletic	50	(12)
2002	→Kilkenny City (loan)	1	(0)
2003	→Dublin City (loan)	9	(1)
2005–2006	Bohemian	40	(11)
2007–2008	Drogheda United	28	(5)
2008	→Bray Wanderers (loan)	8	(2)
2009	Toronto Celtic		
2010	Hamilton Croatia	22	(12)
- * Club domestic league appearances and goals

Aidan O'Keeffe (born March 22, 1982) is an Irish former footballer who played as a midfielder.

== Club career ==
=== Ireland ===
O'Keeffe began his career with St Patrick's Athletic's youth system. In 2002, he joined the senior team and was loaned to Kilkenny City in the League of Ireland First Division. The following season, St. Patrick loaned O'Keeffe to Dublin City for the first portion of the 2003 season. St. Patrick recalled O'Keeffe for the remainder of the 2003 season, and he debuted in the League of Ireland Premier Division. St. Patrick's defeated Longford Town for the League of Ireland Cup throughout the season.

He re-signed with St. Patrick's for the 2004 season and finished the campaign as the club's top goal scorer. O'Keeffe returned to play with St. Patrick's for the 2004 season but was transferred to league rivals Bohemian during the summer transfer market. His tenure with the Bohemians lasted for two seasons, from 2005 to 2006. In 2007, O'Keeffe signed with Drogheda United, where he helped the club win the league title. He participated in the 2007–08 UEFA Cup and played against AC Libertas and Helsingborgs IF. O'Keeffe also assisted the club in securing the 2007 Setanta Sports Cup, though he would miss the final after sustaining an injury.

In 2008, he returned to Drogheda for his final season with the club. O'Keeffe was loaned for the remainder of the season to Bray Wanderers. After the 2008 season concluded, he became a free agent.

=== Canada ===
O'Keeffe ventured abroad to Canada in 2009 and played with the local side, the Toronto Celtic.

The following season, he joined Hamilton Croatia to compete in the Canadian Soccer League's first division. He recorded his first goal for the club on May 15, 2010, against TFC Academy. O'Keeffe recorded his first goal for the club on June 28, 2010, against St. Catharines Wolves. He would finish the campaign as the club's top goal scorer with 12 goals. He also helped the club secure a playoff berth by finishing third in the standings, just two points shy from winning the divisional title. In the opening round of the playoffs, Hamilton defeated TFC Academy in a two-game series. O'Keeffe would contribute a goal in the semifinal round, where Hamilton advanced to the finals by defeating Toronto Croatia. In the championship finals, Brantford Galaxy defeated Hamilton by a score of 3-0.

== Honors ==
Drogheda United

- League of Ireland Premier Division: 2007
- Setanta Sports Cup: 2007

Hamilton Croatia

- CSL Championship runner-up: 2010

St. Patrick's Athletics

- League of Ireland Cup: 2003
