= James Irvin =

James Irvin may refer to:

- James Irvin (politician)
- James Irvin (fighter)

== See also ==
- James Irvine (disambiguation)
