= James Irvine =

James Irvine may refer to:

- James Irvine (Pennsylvania politician) (1735–1819), politician, Vice-President (i.e. Lt. Governor) of Pennsylvania
- James Irvine (chemist) (1877–1952), chemist and Principal of the University of St Andrews
- James Irvine (educator) (1793–1835), second president of Ohio University
- James Irvine (landowner) (1827–1886), co-founder of the Irvine Ranch
- James Irvine (Quebec businessman) (1766–1829), early Canadian businessman and politician
- James Irvine (designer) (1958–2013), Milan-based designer
- James Irvine (painter) (1822–1889), Scottish portrait-painter
- Jim Irvine (field hockey) (born 1948), Australian field hockey player
- Jim Irvine (footballer) (1940–2026), Scottish footballer

== See also ==
- James Irvin (disambiguation)
- James Ervin (disambiguation)
- James K. Irving (1928–2024), heir to J.K. Irving Ltd.
- James Irwin (disambiguation)
