= Mark Dickson (footballer) =

Irish footballer

Personal information
- Date of birth: 12 December 1981 (age 44)
- Place of birth: Belfast, Northern Ireland
- Height: 1.71 m (5 ft 7 1/2 in)
- Position: Striker

Youth career
- St Andrew's Boys
- Dungoyne
- Glentoran
- Northampton Town

Senior career*
Years	Team	Apps	(Gls)
2000	Northampton Town	0	(0)
2000–2001	Newry Town	44	(4)
2001–2006	Larne	133	(40)
2006–2008	Linfield	46	(25)
2008–2010	Crusaders	52	(18)
2010–2011	Donegal Celtic	30	(2)
Total		305	(89)

International career
1999	Northern Ireland U17		
1999–????	Northern Ireland U18		
- * Club domestic league appearances and goals

Mark Dickson (born 12 December 1981) is a former semi-professional footballer from Northern Ireland. He began his football career as a trainee with Northampton Town, for whom he made one first-team appearance in the Football League Trophy, before returning to his native country, where he played for Newry Town, Larne, Linfield, Crusaders and Donegal Celtic. He won the Irish League and Cup double in successive seasons with Linfield, and scored the winning goal for Crusaders in the 2008–09 Irish Cup Final.

== Club career ==
Dickson was born in Belfast. As a schoolboy, he played for the County Antrim under-16 side that reached the quarter-finals of the 1997 Milk Cup, losing to eventual winners Middlesbrough F.C., and also represented Belfast Schools. At club level, he played for St Andrew's Boys, Dunboyne and Glentoran Youth before moving to England to join Northampton Town as a youth trainee. He made only one brief first-team appearance – in the second round of the Football League Trophy on 11 January 2000, as a second-half substitute as Northampton lost to Bristol Rovers in a penalty shootout. While at Northampton, he was called up to the Northern Ireland under-17 team for a friendly match against Wales, and played for the under-18s in the European Championship qualifiers. Dickson completed his two-year apprenticeship with Northampton, but the club did not keep him on.

=== Newry Town ===
The 18-year-old Dickson returned to Northern Ireland in the summer of 2000, took a job in the civil service., and signed on semi-professional terms for Newry Town, amid competition from Portadown and Lisburn Distillery for his services. He marked his competitive debut with a deflected goal as Newry beat Crusaders 3–1 on the opening day of the 2000–01 Irish League season. With eight minutes left of the match against Omagh Town two weeks later and 2–0 down, he produced an overhead kick that went in off the crossbar, after which Tommy Morgan equalised. His cross forced Ricky Culbertson into an own goal that gave Newry their first win at Ballymena United for ten years and eased fears of relegation, and a headed goal four days later against Omagh contributed to Newry's comeback from 2–0 down to win 3–2.

Dickson re-signed for Newry, but his form of the previous season dipped. Lowlights of a 1–0 defeat to Ards – that club's first win of the season – included Dickson's first-half failure to score after the goalkeeper had rushed out of his goal to clear and missed the ball, and later "[doing] the seemingly impossible when blasting the ball over the bar from six yards". He was left out of the starting eleven for some time, but returned against Glentoran to produce "what would have been a contender for goal of the season with the match delicately poised when he stole possession 45 yards from goal, cut inside Chris Walker, beat Paul Leeman and just when he was about to pull the trigger, Walker recovered to concede a corner". With the club in financial difficulties, Dickson was one of several players transfer-listed in December 2001, and he dropped down a division to join Larne a few days later.

=== Larne ===
Dickson contributed his share of goals, including five in three games in January, a header and a 25-yard (23 m) shot in a 4–4 draw with Ballymena, and one of the seven that Larne put past Limavady United in the last game of the season to finish fourth on goal difference. He did however miss a great chance to save Larne from elimination by junior club Killyleagh YC in the sixth round of the Irish Cup.

The Irish League was to be restructured for the 2003–04 season, and the top four teams in the First Division would be promoted. In October 2002, Dickson scored the only goal of the game against Limavady United to give Larne their first home win since the opening day and take them into the automatic promotion positions. The team stayed in and around the top four, and the last promotion place was between them and Bangor for the rest of the season. Dickson's eighth goal of the season, the only goal of the game against Ballyclare Comrades, took them third at the start of March. In April, Larne were losing to Ballymena until Dickson equalised with a 12-yard (11 m) volley, and a stoppage-time winner from Mark Parker took them above Bangor on goal difference. The following week, Dickson scored the only goal of the game against Armagh to leave Larne needing a draw away to Bangor on the last day of the season to secure promotion to the Premier League. Larne's goal, scored when a "free kick from the right seemed to strike Dickson on the back of the neck to loop over [the goalkeeper]'s head", combined with "some stout defending", earned them that draw.

Larne made an unexpectedly good start to the new season. Eliminating Coleraine from the League Cup helped by a goal from Dickson, who was then working as a postman, his opening goal paved the way for a 2–1 defeat of Cliftonville to go second in the league at the end of October. Dickson started the league cup final, also against Cliftonville, but was unable to help his side retain their lead, and Larne lost 5–4 on penalties.

Dickson had been playing on the right of midfield, but new manager Jimmy McGeough used him as a forward. After his performance in a lone striker role as Larne narrowly failed to hold on for a shock win at Linfield, McGeough said he was "too good for the Irish League", and suggested that with his "pace, ability and know-how", he should be "playing across the channel". After a goalless draw against Crusaders, experienced defender Jeff Spiers, who had successfully man-marked Dickson, said he had "a good first touch and is very strong for his height".

In January 2005, Cliftonville made an offer for the player that failed to meet Larne's £20,000 valuation. By March, the Sunday Mirror was calling Dickson "the most sought after player in the Irish League". Although Larne's chairman said the "easy going and quiet" Dickson was happy at the club, they recognised "his talent [would] take him elsewhere". They hoped he would move outside Northern Ireland, so that a transfer fee would be payable; a move within the Irish League would attract only "development compensation" of around £6,000. He scored a hat-trick against Loughgall in the quarter-final of the Irish Cup and a 59th-minute penalty to defeat Ballymena United – whose manager Kenny Shiels saw him as Larne's "main threat", having unsuccessfully tried to sign him during the previous transfer window – in the semi-final. Playing as a lone striker in the final, Dickson "still stood out with his strength and running in difficult circumstances". After he was fouled just outside the penalty area, the Portadown defenders were expecting Dickson to take the free kick himself, but Neil Ogden took it quickly and gave Larne an early lead which did not last. Portadown won 5–1.

Out of contract at Larne, Dickson had decided to follow former manager Tommy Kincaid to Glenavon, but his pre-contract agreement was torn up after Kincaid's dismissal. He trained with Ballymena, but eventually chose to remain with Larne. His 13 goals helped ensure their Premier League survival, then at the end of the season he joined league champions, and the club he supported, Linfield.

=== Linfield ===
Dickson made his Linfield debut in the Champions League qualifier against ND Gorica, marking the occasion with a goal from the penalty spot. Although his penalty in the second leg was saved, and Linfield went out 5–3 on aggregate, goalkeeper Alan Mannus was impressed by his hold-up play and movement, described him as "strong, puts himself about a bit, has a nice burst of pace and if he's given a chance he takes it", and suggested he would provide competition for established strikers Peter Thompson and Glenn Ferguson. Although frequently played on the wing rather than his preferred centre-forward position, he made light of media comment, suggesting that although "signing for Linfield was a dream", he had not been complacent and was "happy to play anywhere". The "fantastic feeling" of "finally getting [his] hands on [his] first league medal" was tempered by concern for former team Larne, threatened with administrative demotion. He scored a hat-trick in the 2006–07 Irish Cup semi-final to eliminate Lisburn Distillery, and scored the opening goal in the final and converted his penalty as Linfield beat Dungannon Swifts in a shootout. He finished the season with 20 goals in all competitions.

In his second season at the club, Dickson had problems maintaining a place in the side even out of position, though accepted that "that will happen if you are at a club like Linfield". His goal in the last league game of the season helped them clinch the title, and in the Cup Final, his introduction as a substitute made a difference as Linfield came back from a goal behind to win 2–1 and secure an unprecedented third consecutive double.

=== Crusaders ===
Dickson turned down Linfield's offer of a new two-year contract at the end of the season, preferring to join Crusaders. He said later that "it was tough sitting on the bench with Linfield but there were quality players there and I decided to take a chance here. After sitting on the bench you have a point to prove so there is that extra bit of motivation in your mind."

Although Dickson's first goal for Crusaders, a stoppage-time winner against Lisburn Distillery, took them into the top three in the Premier League, he accepted his team needed to be more clinical. He expressed surprise that his "impressive form" earned him the Player of the Month award for September, suggesting that players for higher-profile clubs were more likely to win such awards. Dickson made more appearances than any other Crusaders player over the season and was the club's top scorer. His 17th goal, scored after 47 minutes of the 2009 Irish Cup Final when he "thundered a sweet right foot volley high into the roof" of Cliftonville's net, gave Crusaders their first Irish Cup win for 41 years, and Dickson himself his third in three.

The Cup win gave Crusaders entry to the qualifying rounds of the Europa League; Dickson started both legs against FK Rabotnički, who won 5–3 on aggregate. He scored the first goal of the 2009–10 County Antrim Shield final victory over Linfield, but his season was disrupted by a knee injury, which the player believed was exacerbated by Crusaders' artificial pitch. At the end of the season he was out of contract, but on a lengthy waiting list for an operation on his knee.

=== Donegal Celtic ===
Although Dickson was concerned that playing on through his injury had made the problem worse, and might be damaged further if he remained in the Premier League, he signed for Donegal Celtic. He scored his first goal for the club in stoppage time against Crusaders to tie the scores at 4–4, leaving time for Paul McVeigh to snatch a winner from the penalty spot. He finally had his cartilage operation in early November, and was playing again within weeks. By the end of the season, he was fit and had helped Donegal Celtic stay in the Premier League, but rearranged shift patterns in his day job as a postman meant he was no longer available for Saturday football and he announced his retirement:

In the current climate, my work commitments must come first. For now, my football days are at an end.

== Honours ==
Linfield

- Irish Premier League: 2007–08, 2007–08
- Irish Cup: 2006–07, 2007–08
- Irish League Cup: 2007–08

Crusaders

- Irish Cup: 2008–09
- County Antrim Shield: 2009–10
