= 2004–05 County Antrim Shield =

Tournament details
- Country: Northern Ireland
- Teams: 16

Final positions
- Champions: Linfield (40th win)
- Runners-up: Crusaders

Tournament statistics
- Matches played: 15
- Goals scored: 52 (3.47 per match)

The 2004–05 County Antrim Shield was the 116th edition of the County Antrim Shield, a cup competition in Northern Irish football.

Linfield won the tournament for the 40th time and 2nd consecutive season, defeating Crusaders 2–1 in the final.

== Results ==
=== First round ===
Team 1	Score	Team 2
Ards	2–1	Dundela
Ballymena United	0–1	Kilmore Recreation
Cliftonville	2–1	Larne Tech Old Boys
Crusaders	3–1	Ballymoney United
Glentoran	11–0	Glebe Rangers
Larne	2–3	Bangor
Linfield	5–0	Malachians
Lisburn Distillery	2–0	Newington Youth

=== Quarter-finals ===
Team 1	Score	Team 2
Bangor	1–3	Linfield
Cliftonville	2–1	Glentoran
Crusaders	3–0	Ards
Lisburn Distillery	1–1 (a.e.t.) (2–3 p)	Kilmore Recreation

=== Semi-finals ===
Team 1	Score	Team 2
Crusaders	1–0	Cliftonville
Linfield	2–0	Kilmore Recreation

=== Final ===
1 March 2005

Linfield	2–1 (a.e.t.)	Crusaders
Thompson 37', 96'; Murphy (red card) 70'		Munster 74'

The Oval, Belfast
Referee: Adrian McCourt (Belfast)
