= 2005–06 County Antrim Shield =

Tournament details
- Country: Northern Ireland
- Teams: 16

Final positions
- Champions: Linfield (41st win)
- Runners-up: Ballymena United

Tournament statistics
- Matches played: 15
- Goals scored: 56 (3.73 per match)

The 2005–06 County Antrim Shield was the 117th edition of the County Antrim Shield, a cup competition in Northern Irish football.

Linfield were defending champions and won the tournament for the 41st time and 3rd consecutive season, defeating Ballymena United 2–1 in the final.

== Results ==
=== First round ===
Team 1	Score	Team 2
Ards	3–0	Ards Rangers
Ballymena United	3–1	Wakehurst
Cliftonville	4–0	Harland & Wolff Welders
Crusaders	1–0	Dundela
Glentoran	4–0	Bangor
Larne	5–1	Kilmore Recreation
Linfield	2–1 (a.e.t.)	Carrick Rangers
Lisburn Distillery	5–0	Donegal Celtic

=== Quarter-finals ===
Team 1	Score	Team 2
Ards	2–7	Linfield
Ballymena United	2–0	Cliftonville
Crusaders	1–2 (a.e.t.)	Larne
Glentoran	3–2	Lisburn Distillery

=== Semi-finals ===
Team 1	Score	Team 2
Larne	0–3	Ballymena United
Linfield	1–0	Glentoran

=== Final ===
7 February 2006

Linfield	2–1	Ballymena United
Kearney 50'; Ferguson 84'		Kelbie 33'

Seaview, Belfast
Referee: Michael Ross (Carrickfergus)
