= 2003–04 County Antrim Shield =

Tournament details
- Country: Northern Ireland
- Teams: 16

Final positions
- Champions: Linfield (39th win)
- Runners-up: Ards

Tournament statistics
- Matches played: 15
- Goals scored: 49 (3.27 per match)

The 2003–04 County Antrim Shield was the 115th edition of the County Antrim Shield, a cup competition in Northern Irish football.

Linfield won the tournament for the 39th time, defeating Ards 2–0 in the final.

== Results ==
=== First round ===
Team 1	Score	Team 2
Ards	4–1	Carrick Rangers
Ballymena United	3–1	Dunmurry Young Men
Cliftonville	6–0	Holywood
Crusaders	3–0	Bangor
Glentoran	6–1	Donegal Celtic
Larne	4–0	Larne Tech Old Boys
Linfield	4–0	Islandmagee
Lisburn Distillery	0–1	Ballyclare Comrades

=== Quarter-finals ===
Team 1	Score	Team 2
Ballyclare Comrades	0–4	Ards
Crusaders	0–1	Ballymena United
Glentoran	3–0	Cliftonville
Linfield	3–0	Larne

=== Semi-finals ===
Team 1	Score	Team 2
Ards	1–0	Ballymena United
Glentoran	0–1	Linfield

=== Final ===
2 March 2004

Linfield	2–0	Ards
Hunter 69' (o.g.); Larmour 88'

The Oval, Belfast
Referee: David Malcolm (Bangor)
