= Shane Robinson (footballer) =

Irish footballer (born 1980)

Personal information
- Date of birth: 17 December 1980 (age 45)
- Place of birth: Waterford, Ireland
- Position: Midfielder

Senior career*
Years	Team	Apps	(Gls)
1999–2004	Shamrock Rovers	206	(24)
2005–2008	Drogheda United	155	(23)
2009	Shamrock Rovers	32	(2)
2010–2011	Stirling Lions	22	(6)
2011–2012	Haka	60	(15)
2013–2014	Shamrock Rovers	65	(4)
- * Club domestic league appearances and goals

Shane Robinson (born 17 December 1980) is an Irish retired footballer who last played for Shamrock Rovers in the League of Ireland.

== Career ==
=== Shamrock Rovers ===
Shane signed for Shamrock Rovers in 1999 and made a scoring debut. His first month in the league he was awarded Player of the Month. He went on to play for six seasons, making five appearances in European competition. He was Player of the Year for the 2001/02 season.

=== Drogheda United ===
He signed for Drogheda United in the 2005 close season He scored Drogheda's first-ever goal in European competition. He also scored for Drogheda in the Champions League qualifier at Dynamo Kyiv on 7 August 2008. He was an instrumental part in Drogheda United's huge success during his time there, helping the club win the league, the FAI cup and the Setanta cup twice.

=== Shamrock Rovers ===
After four years of trophies at United Park, he signed back for Rovers in January 2009 and captained the first Rovers side to play in Tallaght Stadium and also captained Rovers in their high-profile friendly against Real Madrid in July 2009.

=== Stirling Lions ===
Having finished second in the league, he parted company at the end of the 2009 season and moved to Australia, where he played one season with Stirling Lions in the Football West state league. That season he helped Stirling Lions win the cup and won the League's best player.

=== FC Haka ===
He returned to Europe signing with FC Haka in 2011 scoring seven goals in his first season in Finnish football and winning the supporters' choice for Player of the Year. He won the supporters' choice for Player of the Year again in the 2012 season.

=== Shamrock Rovers ===
He returned to Rovers for the 2013 League of Ireland season.

=== Post-playing career ===
Robinson retired after the 2014 season where he held the role of Academy Director and helped establish the club's academy as a leading player development centre in the country.

In 2023 he was appointed assistant director of football for the Football Association of Ireland
