= Michael Collins (footballer, born 1977) =

Northern Irish footballer (born 1977)

Personal information
- Date of birth: 6 September 1977 (age 49)
- Place of birth: Belfast, Northern Ireland
- Height: 5 ft 10 in (1.78 m)
- Position: Midfielder

Youth career
- 1994–1995: Cliftonville

Senior career*
| Years | Team | Apps | (Gls) |
| 1995–1996 | Sheffield United | 0 | (0) |
| 1996 | Darlington | 1 | (0) |
| 1996–2001 | Cliftonville | 139 | (13) |
| 2001–2007 | Portadown | 139 | (4) |
| 2007–2009 | Newry City | 31 | (2) |
| 2009 | Dundalk | 10 | (2) |
| 2009–2010 | Crusaders | 17 | (1) |
| Total | | 329 | (22) |
- * Club domestic league appearances and goals

Michael Collins (born 16 September 1977) is a Northern Irish retired professional footballer who last played for Irish League club Crusaders.

== Early career ==
Collins started his career at Cliftonville, before leaving for unsuccessful spells in England with Sheffield United and Darlington, before returning to Cliftonville in 1996.

=== Cliftonville ===
Collins was an integral part of the Reds side that won the Irish League title in 1998 – the first time the club had been champions in 88 years.

Three years later an incident during an UEFA Intertoto Cup tie brought his time with the club to an end. Collins had already been sent-off when he head-butted an opponent on his way off the pitch Laurence Stitt, the manager at the time, suspended Collins and put him on the transfer list.

=== Portadown ===
He then joined Portadown and won the league in his first season at Shamrock Park, followed by the Irish Cup three years later.

Unfortunately, Reds boss Ronnie McFall began to see his services as an unaffordable luxury, such was the regularity of his run-ins with officials. He was forced to substitute Collins in a pre season friendly against his old club Sheffield United F.C. in July 2008. Collins returned from a lengthy ban to see red in his first and only 2007–08 Irish League Cup appearance. He famously pushed IFA referee Alan Black in the chest after being sent off for elbowing Newry City's Stephen Ferguson and was given a lengthy suspension. Such was his fiery temper, McFall finally lost patience with him and he was made available to other clubs.

He was also sent off at VMFD Žalgiris Vilnius in the 2004–05 UEFA Cup

=== Newry City ===
In December 2007 Newry City ironically stepped in to avail of his assets. He was given a one-and-a-half-year contract.

His first game was in the reserves where he scored the winner against former club Cliftonville. He was then drafted into the first team and settled into the centre midfield position. He became a very important player and helped Newry to one of their best ever runs in the league.

=== Dundalk ===
Collins' contract ended in February 2009 and was subsequently signed by Dundalk. However, he failed to get international clearance and was prevented from playing competitively until July. He did play in several pre-season friendlies, including the annual Jim Malone Cup match against Drogheda, where he was sent off early in the first half after clashing with Gavin Whelan. He finally played for the Lilywhites against Derry City and was influential as they won 1–0. He scored twice in a match versus Galway United which they comfortably won 3–0 at Terryland Park. He also started the following week in the 4–2 win against Drogheda United and Dundalk's good form at the present is largely thanks to Collins' contribution. Collins' was released at the end of Dundalk's season by the board after the manager Sean Connor's contract was not renewed.

=== Crusaders ===
He signed for Crusaders on 20 November 2009. He made his debut against old club Portadown on 2 January, and helped the side to the County Antrim Shield. He scored his only goal against Coleraine on 23 January. However, he was released after just four months for financial reasons. After having preliminary talks with Donegal Celtic prior to the 2010–11 season, he decided to retire from football.

== Honours ==
- Irish League: 2
  - Cliftonville 1997/98
  - Portadown 2001/2002
- Irish Cup
  - Portadown 2004/05
- County Antrim Shield
  - Crusaders 2009/10
