= Willo McDonagh =

Irish footballer

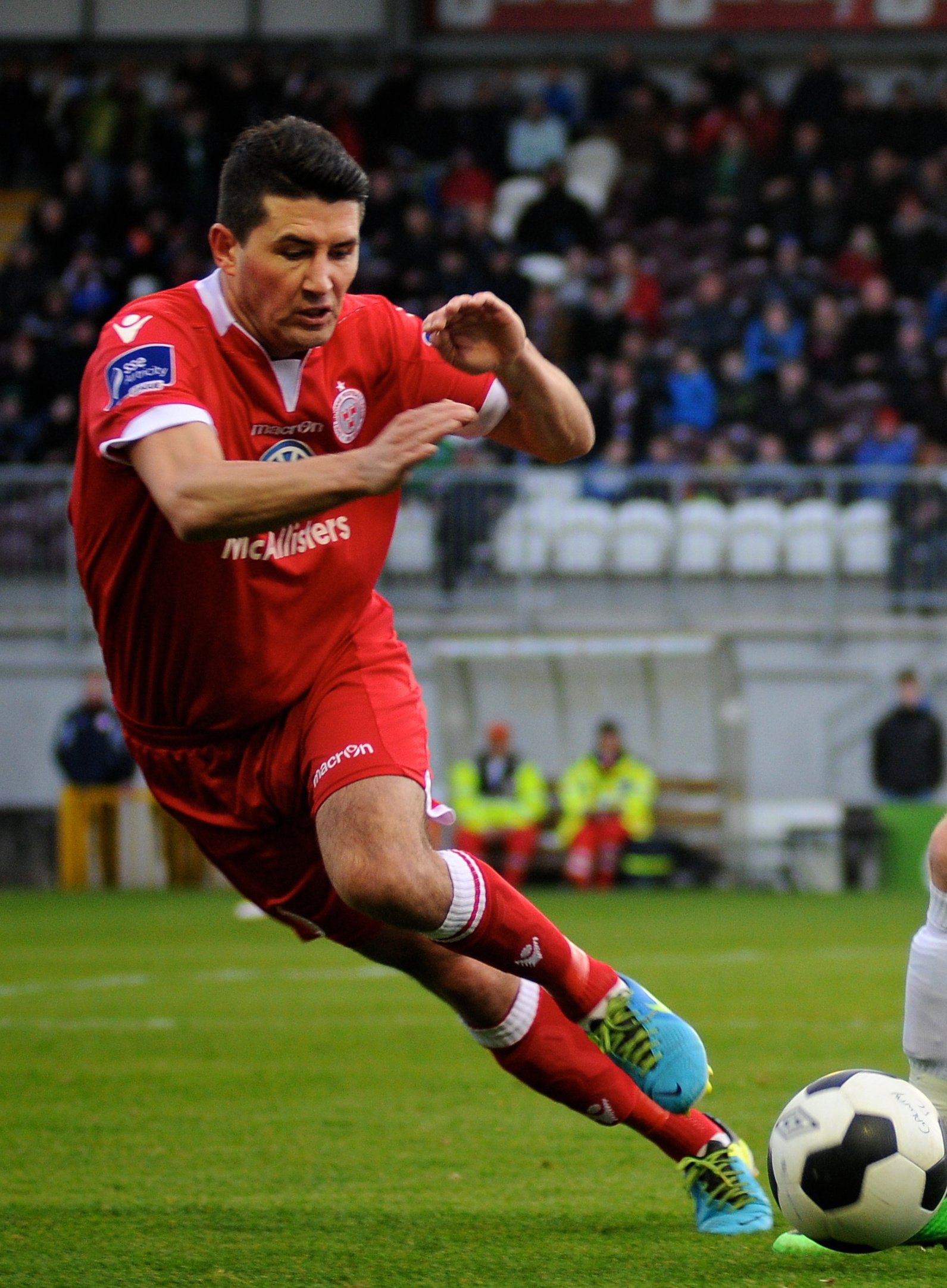
- McDonagh with Shelbourne in 2014

Personal information
- Full name: William McDonagh
- Date of birth: 14 March 1983 (age 43)
- Place of birth: Dublin, Ireland
- Positions: Centre back; midfielder

Youth career
- Bohemians

Senior career*
Years	Team	Apps	(Gls)
2001–2005	Carlisle United	63	(4)
2005	Shamrock Rovers	26	(5)
2006–2008	Glentoran	35	(4)
2008–2011	Glenavon	87	(18)
2008	→ Armagh City	5	(0)
2011–2012	Monaghan United	13	(1)
2012–2013	Longford Town	25	(2)
2014	Shelbourne	19	(1)
- * Club domestic league appearances and goals as of 22:10, 13 March 2014 (UTC)

Willo McDonagh (born 14 March 1983) is an Irish former footballer. The defensive midfield player played for Bohemians, Carlisle United, Shamrock Rovers, Glentoran, Monaghan United and Shelbourne.

== Biography ==
He made his Rovers debut on 18 March 2005 and went on to make a total of 31 appearances in all competitions scoring 6 goals.

McDonagh arrived at The Oval in January 2006 from Shamrock Rovers, and was one of former manager Roy Coyle's final signings before resigning. McDonagh scored his first goal for the club in a 3-2 success against Newry City at the Oval in March, this would be his only for the season.

2006/2007 was a mixed year for McDonagh, with consistency being the main hindrance to him becoming a favourite with the Glentoran crowd. Arguably his best performance for the Glens came in a 4–1 win over Belfast rivals Cliftonville at the Oval in December 2006, where he made surging runs from midfield and scored with a directed header, and many hoped he would have continued this great form into the annual Boxing Day derby clash with arch rivals Linfield, but McDonagh was handed a two-game suspension by the IFA.

Infamous for his disciplinary record, with 11 bookings to his name this season, he has gained a reputation with officials up all over the country after his alleged two-foot stamp on Cliftonville's Ronan Scannell in December's televised CIS League Cup Final, a game which Glentoran went on to win 1-0 thanks to a 32nd minute Gary Hamilton goal. This is McDonagh's only winners medal to date. In 2007 McDonagh was placed on the transfer list.

In February 2008 he was loaned out to Armagh City for one season

Following his release by the Glens, McDonagh signed for Glenavon.

In August 2011, he signed for Monaghan United, again linking up with Roddy Collins. On 18 June 2012, the club announced their withdrawal from the League of Ireland and all of their playing staff were released by the club.

He subsequently signed for Longford Town in June 2012, scoring on his debut against Mervue United, in a 5–4 win for his new club. McDonagh is currently operating in a centre back role under Longford manager Tony Cousins.

== Honours ==
Carlisle United

- Football League Trophy runner-up: 2002–03
