= Adrian Harper =

Irish footballer

Personal information
- Date of birth: 4 May 1985 (age 41)
- Place of birth: Dublin, Republic of Ireland
- Position: Midfielder

Team information
- Current team: Bluebell United

Youth career
- 2001–2003: Sheffield United

Senior career*
Years	Team	Apps	(Gls)
2003–2006	Sheffield United	0	(0)
2005	Scarborough	5	(0)
2006–2011	Glenavon	117	(15)
- * Club domestic league appearances and goals

Adrian Harper (born 4 May 1985) is an Irish professional footballer who plays for Bluebell United.

== Career ==
=== Early years ===
Starting as a trainee with Sheffield United, Harper was captain of the youth and reserve teams for 3 years. He was loaned out to Scarborough Fc, making 5 appearances. After 5 years at Sheffield United Harper was released and signed for Glenavon Fc where he made a permanent move to the Lurgan club in October 2006.

=== Irish League ===
Harper signed for Glenavon in October 2006 and scored his first goals for the club in January 2007 with a brace against Ballymena. During that season Glenavon avoided relegation with a penalty shoot out play off victory against Bangor, a game which saw Harper red carded in injury time.

Better years were to come at the club following new investment and Harper, a fans favourite went on to make 117 appearances under 4 different managers.

=== Later years ===
In the summer of 2011 Harper joined his local Leinster Senior League side Glebe North↵where he spent 3 months before signing for Bluebell United where he has remained since. Harper now runs his own successful gym company ProFitness Gym in Ireland.

== Honours ==
=== Team ===
Glenavon

- Mid-Ulster Cup: 2009/2010, 2010/2011
