= Everaldo dos Santos =

Brazilian footballer (born 1974)

Everaldo Luiz Cesar (born 1 October 1974) is a Brazilian former professional footballer who played as a midfielder. He spent four years with Northern Irish club Dungannon Swifts from 2003 to 2007, playing for the club in the Intertoto Cup and the Irish Cup final. He had previously played in Brazil for XV de Novembro, Sinop, Itumbiara, and Apucarana.
