= Aidan O'Kane =

Northern Irish footballer

Personal information
- Date of birth: 24 November 1979 (age 46)
- Place of birth: Belfast, Northern Ireland
- Height: 5 ft 9 in (1.75 m)
- Position: Left back

Youth career
- Crumlin Star

Senior career*
| Years | Team | Apps | (Gls) |
| 2000–2001 | Cliftonville | 28 | (6) |
| 2001–2003 | York City | 12 | (0) |
| 2003–2011 | Linfield | 290 | (41) |
| 2011–2013 | Glentoran | 20 | (0) |
| 2013–2014 | Carrick Rangers | 0 | (0) |
- * Club domestic league appearances and goals as of 17:50, 14 November 2010

Aidan O'Kane (born 24 November 1979 in Belfast, Northern Ireland) is a retired footballer.

While at Cliftonville, he played in the UEFA Intertoto Cup. From his time at York he played against Leeds, Boro, Sheff Wed and Sunderland in friendly games and played in both the FA Cup and League Cup. Before his return to Northern Ireland he spent a short time at Scarborough. At Linfield he played in the UEFA Cup and UEFA Champions League and in three glamour games against Rangers. Honours 3 league titles, 3 CO Antrim Shield, 2 CIS league cup, 1 Setanta Cup, 1 Irish FA Cup and runner up in CIS league cup, North Riding cup and Setanta Cup. He was also voted player of the year on a text vote for season 2005–2006. On 17 May 2011, he signed a 1-year contract with Glentoran.

Aidan O'Kane came as a shock when the Glentoran fans heard he had signed, after being a Linfield fan favourite for so many years. Linfield arguably treated the player unfairly after a couple of years of frustration of playing at reserve level O'Kane signed up to Scott Young's Glentoran.

Aidan O'Kane got man of the match on his Glentoran debut against Peter Hutton's Finn Harps, O'Kane played in his left back position.

Aidan O'Kane made his Glentoran competitive debut against FK Renova at the Oval. Glentoran won the game 2–1 and won 3–2 on penalties. Glentoran created history that night and went through to the second round of the UEFA Europa League. O'Kane is now in his second term with Carrick Rangers. Last season, he picked up all main five awards at the club.
