= Damian Lynch =

Irish footballer

Personal information
- Date of birth: 31 July 1979 (age 47)
- Place of birth: Dublin, Ireland
- Position: Right back

Youth career
- St Kevin's Boys

Senior career*
Years	Team	Apps	(Gls)
1997–2001	Leeds United	0	(0)
2001–2002	Nottingham Forest	0	(0)
2002–2004	Bohemians	80	(2)
2005–2007	Drogheda United	73	(3)
2008–2010	St Patrick's Athletic	77	(4)

International career
2000–2001	Republic of Ireland U21		
- * Club domestic league appearances and goals

Damian Lynch (born 31 July 1979) is an Irish retired professional footballer who played for Leeds United, Nottingham Forest, Bohemians, Drogheda United and St Patrick's Athletic.

== Career ==
From Santry, where he played his football with St Kevin's Boys before he was enticed across to Leeds United. He was a member of the Leeds team that won the FA Youth Cup in 1997 when his teammates included Harry Kewell, Jonathan Woodgate, and Stephen McPhail. Lynch played for the Republic of Ireland national under-19 football team in the 1997 UEFA European Under-18 Football Championship finals in Iceland. He has also been capped several times by the Republic of Ireland at Under 21 level. Much of his career has been ravaged by a series of injuries, mainly shin splints and groin problems. Released by Leeds, he was signed by Nottingham Forest in October 2001 where he played reserve team football.

His former clubs include Drogheda United (with whom he won the League of Ireland), Bohemians, Nottingham Forest and Leeds United . Damian signed for the Saints in 2008 from Drogheda and played an important part in their UEFA Cup 2008–09 campaign.

Lynch scored twice in the UEFA Cup for Drogheda in 2006 against HJK Helsinki.

His final game in professional football was away to Drogheda United in a 1–0 win for The Saints on 5 October 2010.

His older brother Aidan Lynch also played in the League of Ireland.

== Honours ==
Leeds United

- FA Youth Cup (1): 1997

Bohemians

- League of Ireland Premier Division (1): 2002-03

Drogheda United

- League of Ireland Premier Division (1): 2007
- FAI Cup (1): 2005
- Setanta Sports Cup (2): 2006, 2007
