= 2006 Shelbourne F.C. season =

Shelbourne
2006 season
- Chairman: Ollie Byrne
- Manager: Pat Fenlon
- Premier Division: 1st
- UEFA Intertoto Cup: Second round
- FAI Cup: Third round
- League Cup: Runners-Up
- Setanta Sports Cup: Semi-finals
- Top goalscorer: League: Jason Byrne (15); All: Jason Byrne (23)
Home colours	Away colours	Third colours

In the 2006 season, Shelbourne were crowned League of Ireland Premier Division champions.

== Overview ==
Despite having battled with dire finances for much of the 2006 season, mainly due to market risk-taking in the drive for success, over-expenditure on player-purchase fees, high wages, low home attendance rates and continuing tax debts, Shelbourne actually managed to win the title. However, they had been hit with three winding-up orders by the Revenue Commissioners within a spell of nine months but just about managed to gather enough funds and investment to keep the tax collectors off their backs and keep the club running on each occasion. This was at the expense of the players, though, who had gone for weeks without their wages and it seemed that the only thing keeping them performing at the club was the season's climax and the drive for the title, as well as promises (which ultimately turned out to be empty) of a remedy. Once the season came to a close the rot set in and the general public were made fully aware of the true extent of how poor a state the club were in. Due to the finances, many found it extraordinary that Shelbourne had been awarded a Premier Division licence for 2007 by the Independent Assessment Group a few months earlier. They saw it as another chance to criticise the lack of transparency within the organisation that appointed the Group who were supposed to dispense licences to clubs who were solvent and financially stable for the foreseeable future - the Football Association of Ireland. The association has been well used to criticism of its administration in the past, but clearly, the Group could not have been said to have performed their role effectively.

Manager Pat Fenlon tendered his resignation from Shelbourne on 5 December 2006. This was in spite of Shelbourne winning the title on goal difference from Derry City. Fenlon's departure precipitated a widescale exodus from Tolka Park, as players, unhappy with the wage situation, departed to rival clubs - many having their contracts rescinded by law.

== Personnel ==
=== Managerial/backroom staff ===
Manager: Pat Fenlon
Assistant Manager: Eamon Collins

=== 2006 squad members ===
Note: Flags indicate national team as defined under FIFA eligibility rules; some limited exceptions apply. Players may hold more than one non-FIFA nationality.

No.	Pos.	Nation	Player
1	GK	WAL	Steve Williams
2	DF	IRL	Owen Heary (Captain)
3	DF	IRL	David Crawley
4	DF	ENG	Dave Rogers
5	DF	WAL	Jamie Harris
6	MF	IRL	Jim Crawford
7	MF	IRL	Ollie Cahill
8	MF	IRL	Stuart Byrne
9	FW	IRL	Glen Crowe
10	FW	IRL	Jason Byrne
11	MF	IRL	James Chambers
12	MF	IRL	Greg O'Halloran

No.	Pos.	Nation	Player
14	MF	IRL	Richie Baker
15	MF	IRL	Alan Moore
16	FW	IRL	Gary O'Neill
17	MF	IRL	Bobby Ryan
18	MF	CMR	Joseph Ndo
19	DF	IRL	Colin Hawkins
20	GK	IRL	Dean Delany
21	MF	IRL	David Tyrrell
22	DF	IRL	Sean Dillon
23	MF	IRL	Alan Reynolds
24	MF	IRL	Liam Kearney
30	MF	IRL	Gary Deegan

=== Out on loan ===
Note: Flags indicate national team as defined under FIFA eligibility rules; some limited exceptions apply. Players may hold more than one non-FIFA nationality.

No.	Pos.	Nation	Player
—	MF	IRL	James Chambers (was on loan to Waterford United)
—	MF	IRL	Gary Deegan (was on loan to Kilkenny City)

No.	Pos.	Nation	Player
—	MF	IRL	David Tyrrell (was on loan to Bray Wanderers)

=== Transfers In ===
The following players joined Shelbourne for the 2006 campaign:

Date	Pos.	Name	From
8 December 2005	MF	(Republic of Ireland) Greg O'Halloran	Cork City
10 January 2006	DF	(Republic of Ireland) Sean Dillon	Longford Town
11 February 2006	MF	(Republic of Ireland) Liam Kearney	Cork City

=== Transfers Out ===
Date	Pos.	Name	To
19 November 2005	MF	(Republic of Ireland) Alan Cawley	UCD
19 November 2005	DF	(Republic of Ireland) Kevin Doherty	Longford Town
19 November 2005	FW	(Republic of Ireland) Glen Fitzpatrick	Drogheda United
19 November 2005	DF	(Republic of Ireland) Curtis Fleming	
19 November 2005	DF	(Republic of Ireland) Derek Pender	Dublin City
19 November 2005	FW	(Republic of Ireland) Ger Rowe	Ballymena United
19 November 2005	MF	(Republic of Ireland) Hussain Yazdani	Kilkenny City
30 December 2005	MF	(Republic of Ireland) Wes Hoolahan	Livingston
	MF	(Republic of Ireland) Brian King	Kilkenny City
12 July 2006	MF	(Republic of Ireland) Alan Reynolds	Waterford United

== Results ==
=== League of Ireland Premier Division ===
10 March 2006	Bray Wanderers	2 – 2	Shelbourne	Carlisle Grounds, Bray
19.45 GMT	Éamon Zayed 12'; Paul Caffrey 45'; Wesley Charles (red card) 75'	Report	Jason Byrne 19', 76' (pen.)	Referee: Dave McKeon (Meath)

17 March 2006	Shelbourne	0 – 0	Longford Town	Tolka Park, Dublin
20.00 GMT		Report		Referee: Pat Whelan (Dublin)

24 March 2006	St Patrick's Athletic	2 – 2	Shelbourne	Richmond Park, Dublin
19.45 GMT	Mark Rutherford 3'; Trevor Molloy 17'; Paul Keegan (red card) 56'	Report	Jason Byrne 56'; Colin Hawkins 83'; Owen Heary (red card) 56'	Attendance: 2,145; Referee: Alan Kelly (Cork)

7 April 2006	Waterford United	0 – 1	Shelbourne	R.S.C., Waterford
19.45 IST		Report	Jason Byrne 41'	Referee: Anthony Buttimer (Cork)

22 April 2006	UCD	1 – 2	Shelbourne	Belfield Park, Dublin
17.15 IST	Derek Doyle 72'	Report	Gary O'Neill 71'; Liam Kearney 84'	Attendance: 710; Referee: Tom Connolly (Dublin)

29 April 2006	Sligo Rovers	1 – 1	Shelbourne	The Showgrounds, Sligo
19.30 IST	Conor O'Grady 15'	Report	Gary O'Neill 7'	Referee: Paul Tuite (Dublin)

4 May 2006	Shelbourne	2 – 1	Drogheda United	Tolka Park, Dublin
20.00 IST	Stuart Byrne 12'; Gary O'Neill 72'	Report	Declan O'Brien 88'	Referee: Ian Stokes (Dublin)

15 May 2006	Cork City	2 – 1	Shelbourne	Turners Cross, Cork
20.00 IST	George O'Callaghan 42'; Neale Fenn 48'	Report	Jason Byrne 40' (pen.)	Referee: Damien Hancock (Dublin)

19 May 2006	Shelbourne	2 – 0	Bohemians	Tolka Park, Dublin
20.00 IST	Colin Hawkins 16'; Stuart Byrne 50'	Report		Referee: Alan Kelly (Cork)

2 June 2006	Shelbourne	4 – 1	Bray Wanderers	Tolka Park, Dublin
20.00 IST	Gary O'Neill 18', 78'; Jason Byrne 63'; Ollie Cahill 86'	Report	Brian McGovern 70'	Referee: Damien Hancock (Dublin)

6 June 2006	Shelbourne	1 – 0	Derry City	Tolka Park, Dublin
20.00 IST	Jason Byrne 89'	Report		Referee: Dave McKeon (Meath)

27 June 2006	Shelbourne	3 – 0	St. Patrick's Athletic	Tolka Park, Dublin
20.00 IST	Jason Byrne 32' 45'; Glen Crowe 76'	Report		Referee: Ian Stokes (Dublin)

17 July 2006	Shelbourne	5 – 1	Waterford United	Tolka Park, Dublin
20.00 IST	Bobby Ryan 45'; Colin Hawkins 60'; Joseph Ndo 63'; Glen Crowe 67' 90'	Report	Mitchell Casey 61'	Referee: Declan Hanney (Dublin)

21 July 2006	Shelbourne	6 – 0	UCD	Tolka Park, Dublin
20.00 IST	Glen Crowe 12' 78'; Jason Byrne 46' 83'; Joseph Ndo 55'; Ollie Cahill 71'	Report		Referee: Alan Kelly (Cork)

28 July 2006	Shelbourne	3 – 0	Sligo Rovers	Tolka Park, Dublin
20.00 IST	Ollie Cahill 7'; Jason Byrne 52' 57'	Report	Liam Burns (red card) 50'	Referee: Paul Tuite (Dublin)

4 August 2006	Drogheda United	1 – 3	Shelbourne	United Park, Drogheda
19.45 IST	Stephen Bradley 90'	Report	Stuart Byrne 35' (pen.); Ollie Cahill 58'; Owen Heary 76'	Referee: Alan Kelly (Cork)

11 August 2006	Shelbourne	2 – 2	Cork City	Tolka Park, Dublin
20.00 IST	Jason Byrne 43'; Glen Crowe 80'	Report	Denis Behan 20'; Roy O'Donovan 62' (pen.); Joe Gamble (red card) 87'	Referee: Damien Hancock (Dublin)

18 August 2006	Bohemians	2 – 1	Shelbourne	Dalymount Park, Dublin
19.45 IST	Fergal Harkin 65'; Stephen Caffrey 75'	Report	Glen Crowe 58'	Referee: Paul Tuite (Dublin)

1 September 2006	Bray Wanderers	2 – 3	Shelbourne	Carlisle Grounds, Bray
19.45 IST	Colm Tresson 34'; Lee Roche 36'	Report	Greg O'Halloran 48'; Bobby Ryan 65'; Glen Crowe 90+3'	Referee: Hugo Whoriskey (Meath)

8 September 2006	Shelbourne	2 – 0	Longford Town	Tolka Park, Dublin
20.00 IST	Gary O'Neill 7'; Glen Crowe 65'	Report		Referee: Paul Tuite (Dublin)

15 September 2006	St. Patrick's Athletic	1 – 3	Shelbourne	Richmond Park, Dublin
19.45 IST	Keith Fahey 8'	Report	Gary O'Neill 27'; Glen Crowe 84'; Jamie Harris 86'	Referee: Pat Whelan (Dublin)

22 September 2006	Shelbourne	2 – 2	Derry City	Tolka Park, Dublin
19.45 IST	Owen Heary 60'; Glen Crowe 78'	Report	Pat McCourt 24'; Kevin Deery 26'; Pat Jennings (red card) 44'	Referee: Paul Tuite (Dublin)

6 October 2006	Waterford United	0 – 1	Shelbourne	R.S.C., Waterford
19.45 IST		Report	Stuart Byrne 63' (pen.)	Referee: Pat Whelan (Dublin)

10 October 2006	Longford Town	0 – 0	Shelbourne	Flancare Park, Longford
19.45 IST		Report		Referee: Anthony Buttimer (Cork)

20 October 2006	UCD	0 – 2	Shelbourne	Belfield Park, Dublin
19.45 IST		Report	Jason Byrne 20'; Richie Baker 52'	Referee: Richie Winter (Dublin)

24 October 2006	Derry City	2 – 0	Shelbourne	Brandywell Stadium, Derry
19.45 IST	Ciarán Martyn 52'; Pat McCourt 64'	Report		Referee: Damien Hancock (Dublin)

3 November 2006	Shelbourne	2 – 2	Drogheda United	Tolka Park, Dublin
19.30 GMT	Gary O'Neill 52'; Greg O'Halloran 57'	Report	Jason Gavin 2'; Gavin Whelan 58'	Referee: Paul Tuite (Dublin)

7 November 2006	Sligo Rovers	0 – 2	Shelbourne	The Showgrounds, Sligo
19.45 GMT		Report	Stuart Byrne 27'; Adam Hughes 68' (o.g.)	Referee: Anthony Buttimer (Cork)

10 November 2006	Cork City	1 – 0	Shelbourne	Turners Cross, Cork
19.30 GMT	Roy O'Donovan 59'; Joe Gamble (red card) 83'	Report		Referee: Ian Stokes (Dublin)

17 November 2006	Shelbourne	2 – 1	Bohemians	Tolka Park, Dublin
19.45 GMT	Stuart Byrne 23' (pen.); Glen Crowe 29'; Richie Baker (red card) 89'	Report	Barry Ferguson 14'	Referee: Alan Kelly (Cork)

==== Expunged League Results ====
14 April 2006	Shelbourne	1 – 0	Dublin City	Tolka Park, Dublin
20.00 IST	Gary O'Neill 29'	Report		Referee: Declan Hanney (Dublin)

14 July 2006	Dublin City	1 – 2	Shelbourne	Dalymount Park, Dublin
19.45 IST	David Freeman 66'	Report	Bobby Ryan 16'; Joseph Ndo 44'	Referee: Anthony Buttimer (Cork)

== Final League ==
Pos	Team	Pld	W	D	L	GF	GA	GD	Pts	Qualification or relegation
1	Shelbourne (C, R)	30	18	8	4	60	27	+33	62	Demotion to League of Ireland First Division (Note: Shelbourne were demoted to the First Division for financial irregularities.)
2	Derry City	30	18	8	4	46	20	+26	62	Qualification to Champions League first qualifying round
3	Drogheda United	30	16	10	4	37	23	+14	58	Qualification to UEFA Cup first qualifying round
4	Cork City	30	15	11	4	37	15	+22	56	Qualification to Intertoto Cup first round
5	Sligo Rovers	30	11	7	12	33	42	−9	40	

(C) Champions; (R) Relegated

=== League results summary ===
Overall								Home						Away					
Pld	W	D	L	GF	GA	GD	Pts	W	D	L	GF	GA	GD	W	D	L	GF	GA	GD
30	18	8	4	60	27	+33	62	10	4	0	36	10	+26	8	4	4	24	17	+7

Last updated: 17 November 2006.
Source: League of Ireland Premier Division Fixtures

=== League Form/Results by Round ===
Round	1	2	3	4	5	6	7	8	9	10	11	12	13	14	15	16	17	18	19	20	21	22	23	24	25	26	27	28	29	30
Ground	A	H	A	A	A	A	H	A	H	H	H	H	H	H	H	A	H	A	A	H	A	H	A	A	A	A	H	A	A	H
Result	D	D	D	W	W	D	W	L	W	W	W	W	W	W	W	W	D	L	W	W	W	D	W	D	W	L	D	W	L	W

Updated to match(es) played on 17 November 2006. Source: League of Ireland Premier Division Fixtures
A = Away; H = Home; W = Win; D = Draw; L = Loss

=== UEFA Intertoto Cup ===
==== First round ====
18 June 2006	FK Vetra	0 – 1	Shelbourne	Vetra Stadium, Vilnius
16.00 IST		Report	Sean Dillon 42'	Referee: Svein Oddvar Moen (Norway)

24 June 2006	Shelbourne	4 – 0	FK Vetra	Tolka Park, Dublin
19.00 IST	Bobby Ryan 35'; Jason Byrne 66' 90+1'; Glen Crowe 68'	Report	Julius Raliukonis (red card) 3'; Rolandas Karcemarskas (red card) 45'; Robertas Vezevicius (red card) 66'	Referee: Markus Strömbergson (Sweden)

Shelbourne won 5 - 0 on aggregate

==== Second round ====
2 July 2006	OB Odense	3 – 0	Shelbourne	Fionia Park, Odense
14.00 IST	Morten Fevang 28' 41' 57'	Report	Jason Byrne (penalty missed) 53' (pen.)	Referee: Tsvetan Georgiev (Bulgaria)

9 July 2006	Shelbourne	1 – 0	OB Odense	Tolka Park, Dublin
15.00 IST	Joseph Ndo 32'	Report		Referee: Dietmar Drabek (Austria)

OB Odense won 3 - 1 on aggregate

=== FAI Carlsberg Cup ===
==== Second round ====
27 May 2006	Bangor Celtic	1 – 3	Shelbourne	Tolka Park, Dublin
19.00 IST	Brian Warren 75'	Report	Owen Heary 27'; Jason Byrne 29'; Stuart Byrne 82'	Referee: Paul Tuite (Dublin)

==== Third round ====
27 August 2006	Shelbourne	0 – 1	Derry City	Tolka Park, Dublin
18.30 IST		Report	Darren Kelly 22'	Referee: Alan Kelly (Cork)

=== eircom League Cup ===
==== Second round ====
8 May 2006	Dublin City	0 – 1	Shelbourne	Dalymount Park, Dublin
19.45 IST		Report	Derek Pender 22' (o.g.)	Referee: Pat Whelan (Dublin)

==== Quarter-Finals ====
5 July 2006	Shelbourne	4 – 1	Finn Harps	Tolka Park, Dublin
20.00 IST	Jason Byrne 3' 59'; Glen Crowe 68'; Greg O'Halloran 74'	Report	Chris Malseed 86'	Attendance: 306; Referee: Derek Tomney (Dublin)

==== Semi-Finals ====
7 August 2006	Shelbourne	1 – 0	Bohemians	Tolka Park, Dublin
20.00 IST	Joseph Ndo 77'	Report	Vinny Arkins (red card) 8'; Jason McGuinness (red card) 88'	Referee: Ian Stokes (Dublin)

==== Final ====
18 September 2006	Derry City	0 – 0 (a.e.t.) (3 – 0 p)	Shelbourne	Brandywell Stadium, Derry
20.00 IST	David Forde (red card) 83'; Killian Brennan (red card) 97'	Report		Referee: Ian Stokes (Dublin)
	Penalties
	Kevin Deery (penalty scored); Ruaidhri Higgins (penalty scored); Darren Kelly (penalty scored)		(penalty missed) Dave Rogers; (penalty missed) Jason Byrne; (penalty missed) Glen Crowe

=== Setanta Sports Cup ===
==== Group B ====
20 February 2006	Shelbourne	3 – 0	Glentoran	Tolka Park, Dublin
19.45 GMT	Bobby Ryan 29'; Glen Crowe 36' 59'	Report

28 February 2006	Derry City	0 – 0	Shelbourne	Brandywell Stadium, Derry
20.00 GMT		Report		Referee: Michael Ross (Carrickfergus)

13 March 2006	Linfield	2 – 0	Shelbourne	Windsor Park, Belfast
20.00 GMT	Michael Gault 34'; Peter Thompson 53'	Report		Referee: David Malcolm (Bangor)

20 March 2006	Shelbourne	0 – 0	Linfield	Tolka Park, Dublin
20.00 GMT	Colin Hawkins (red card) 75'	Report	Paul McAreavey (red card) 24'	Referee: Alan Kelly (Cork)

27 March 2006	Glentoran	0 – 3	Shelbourne	The Oval, Belfast
19.45 IST		Report	Jason Byrne 17' 58'; Ollie Cahill 31'	Referee: Adrian McCourt (Bangor)

3 April 2006	Shelbourne	1 – 1	Derry City	Tolka Park, Dublin
20.00 IST	Jason Byrne 17'	Report	Ciarán Martyn 90'	Referee: David Malcolm (Bangor)

===== Final Group B Table =====
Pos	Team	Pld	W	D	L	GF	GA	GD	Pts	Qualification
1	(Northern Ireland) Linfield (A)	6	2	4	0	12	4	+8	10	Advanced to the semi-finals
2	(Republic of Ireland) Shelbourne (A)	6	2	3	1	7	3	+4	9	Advanced to the semi-finals
3	(Republic of Ireland) Derry City	6	1	4	1	5	4	+1	7	
4	(Northern Ireland) Glentoran	6	1	1	4	5	18	−13	4	

(A) Advance to a further round

==== Semi-Finals ====
10 April 2006	Cork City	2 – 0	Shelbourne	Turners Cross, Cork
20.00 IST	Colin O'Brien 34'; Neale Fenn 60'	Report	Jason Byrne (penalty missed) 55' (pen.); David Crawley (red card) 90'	Referee: David Malcolm (Bangor)

=== Friendlies ===
26 January 2006	Dundalk	0 – 2	Shelbourne	Oriel Park, Dundalk
19.30 GMT		Report	Jason Byrne 60'; Brian King 86'

3 February 2006	Galway United	0 – 3	Shelbourne	Terryland Park, Galway
19.30 GMT		Report	Jamie Harris 9'; Glen Crowe 86'; Jason Byrne 88'

7 February 2006	Shenyang Ginde	1 – 1	Shelbourne	Antequera, Costa del Sol
15.00 GMT	N/A	Report	Jason Byrne 35'

14 February 2006	Shelbourne	3 – 0	Shamrock Rovers	Tolka Park, Dublin
20.00 GMT	Gary O'Neill 12'; Alan Moore 16'; Glen Crowe 31'; Greg O'Halloran (red card); David Crawley (red card)	Report		Referee: Ian Stokes (Dublin)

23 February 2006	Kilkenny City	0 – 4	Shelbourne	Buckley Park, Kilkenny
19.30 GMT		Report	Jason Byrne 3' 47' (pen.) 61'; Gary O'Neill 77'

24 July 2006	Shelbourne	0 – 2	Sunderland	Tolka Park, Dublin
20.00 IST		Report	Daryl Murphy 49'; Rory Delap 67'	Referee: Declan Hanney (Dublin)

== 2006 season Statistics ==
=== Player appearances/goals ===
As of 17 November 2006.

No.	Pos	Nat	Player	Total		League		Cup	
No.	Pos	Nat	Player	Apps	Goals	Apps	Goals	Apps	Goals
1	GK	(Wales) WAL	Steve Williams	22	0	15	0	7	0
2	DF	(Republic of Ireland) IRL	Owen Heary	36	3	21	2	15	1
3	DF	(Republic of Ireland) IRL	David Crawley	10	0	4	0	6	0
4	DF	(England) ENG	Dave Rogers	39	0	27	0	12	0
5	DF	(Wales) WAL	Jamie Harris	28	1	18	1	10	0
6	MF	(Republic of Ireland) IRL	Jim Crawford	15	0	9	0	6	0
7	MF	(Republic of Ireland) IRL	Ollie Cahill	45	5	28	4	17	1
8	MF	(Republic of Ireland) IRL	Stuart Byrne	42	7	27	6	15	1
9	FW	(Republic of Ireland) IRL	Glen Crowe	46	16	29	12	17	4
10	FW	(Republic of Ireland) IRL	Jason Byrne	39	23	26	15	13	8
11	MF	(Republic of Ireland) IRL	James Chambers	0	0	0	0	0	0
12	MF	(Republic of Ireland) IRL	Greg O'Halloran	25	3	15	2	10	1
14	MF	(Republic of Ireland) IRL	Richie Baker	30	1	20	1	10	0
15	MF	(Republic of Ireland) IRL	Alan Moore	22	0	14	0	8	0
16	FW	(Republic of Ireland) IRL	Gary O'Neill	29	8	22	8	7	0
17	MF	(Republic of Ireland) IRL	Bobby Ryan	35	4	20	2	15	2
18	MF	(Cameroon) CMR	Joseph Ndo	35	4	24	2	11	2
19	DF	(Republic of Ireland) IRL	Colin Hawkins	39	3	26	3	13	0
20	GK	(Republic of Ireland) IRL	Dean Delany	29	0	16	0	13	0
21	MF	(Republic of Ireland) IRL	David Tyrrell	0	0	0	0	0	0
22	DF	(Republic of Ireland) IRL	Sean Dillon	45	1	29	0	16	1
23	MF	(Republic of Ireland) IRL	Alan Reynolds	14	0	7	0	7	0
24	MF	(Republic of Ireland) IRL	Liam Kearney	16	1	10	1	6	0
30	MF	(Republic of Ireland) IRL	Gary Deegan	1	0	0	0	1	0

=== Top goalscorers ===
Position	Goalscorer	Total Goals	League Goals	Cup Goals
1	(Republic of Ireland) Jason Byrne	23	15	8
2	(Republic of Ireland) Glen Crowe	16	12	4
3	(Republic of Ireland) Gary O'Neill	8	8	0
4	(Republic of Ireland) Stuart Byrne	7	6	1
5	(Republic of Ireland) Ollie Cahill	5	4	1
6	(Cameroon) Joseph Ndo	4	2	2
	(Republic of Ireland) Bobby Ryan	4	2	2
8	(Republic of Ireland) Colin Hawkins	3	3	0
	(Republic of Ireland) Owen Heary	3	2	1
	(Republic of Ireland) Greg O'Halloran	3	2	1
11	(Wales) Jamie Harris	1	1	0
	(Republic of Ireland) Richie Baker	1	1	0
	(Republic of Ireland) Sean Dillon	1	0	1
	(Republic of Ireland) Liam Kearney	1	1	0
