= 2005 Shelbourne F.C. season =

Shelbourne
2005 season
- Chairman: Ollie Byrne
- Manager: Pat Fenlon
- Premier Division: 3rd
- UEFA Champions League: Second Qualifying Round
- FAI Cup: Second round
- League Cup: Semi-finals
- Setanta Cup: Runners-Up
- Top goalscorer: League: Jason Byrne (22); All: Jason Byrne (30)
Home colours	Away colours	Third colours

In the 2005 season, Shelbourne finished 3rd in the League of Ireland Premier Division.

== Personnel ==
=== Managerial/Backroom Staff ===
Manager: Pat Fenlon
Assistant Manager: Eamon Collins

=== 2005 Squad Members ===
Note: Flags indicate national team as defined under FIFA eligibility rules; some limited exceptions apply. Players may hold more than one non-FIFA nationality.

No.	Pos.	Nation	Player
—	GK	(Wales) WAL	Steve Williams
—	GK	(Republic of Ireland) IRL	Dean Delany
—	DF	(Republic of Ireland) IRL	Owen Heary (Captain)
—	DF	(Republic of Ireland) IRL	Curtis Fleming
—	DF	(Republic of Ireland) IRL	Stephen Brennan
—	DF	(Republic of Ireland) IRL	Kevin Doherty
—	DF	(Wales) WAL	Jamie Harris
—	DF	(Republic of Ireland) IRL	Colin Hawkins
—	DF	(England) ENG	Dave Rogers
—	DF	(Republic of Ireland) IRL	David Crawley
—	MF	(Republic of Ireland) IRL	Richie Baker
—	MF	(Republic of Ireland) IRL	Bobby Ryan
—	MF	(Republic of Ireland) IRL	Hussain Yazdani
—	MF	(Republic of Ireland) IRL	Stuart Byrne
—	MF	(Republic of Ireland) IRL	Alan Cawley

No.	Pos.	Nation	Player
—	MF	(Republic of Ireland) IRL	James Chambers
—	MF	(Republic of Ireland) IRL	Jim Crawford
—	MF	(Republic of Ireland) IRL	Brian King
—	MF	(Cameroon) CMR	Joseph Ndo
—	MF	(Republic of Ireland) IRL	Alan Moore
—	MF	(Republic of Ireland) IRL	Alan Reynolds
—	MF	(Republic of Ireland) IRL	Wes Hoolahan
—	MF	(Republic of Ireland) IRL	Ollie Cahill
—	MF	(Republic of Ireland) IRL	David Tyrrell
—	FW	(Republic of Ireland) IRL	Jason Byrne
—	FW	(Republic of Ireland) IRL	Glen Crowe
—	FW	(Republic of Ireland) IRL	Glen Fitzpatrick
—	FW	(Republic of Ireland) IRL	Gary O'Neill
—	FW	(Republic of Ireland) IRL	Ger Rowe

=== In on loan ===
Note: Flags indicate national team as defined under FIFA eligibility rules; some limited exceptions apply. Players may hold more than one non-FIFA nationality.

No.	Pos.	Nation	Player
—	DF	(Republic of Ireland) IRL	Stephen Brennan (was on loan from Newcastle United)

=== Out on loan ===
Note: Flags indicate national team as defined under FIFA eligibility rules; some limited exceptions apply. Players may hold more than one non-FIFA nationality.

No.	Pos.	Nation	Player
—	MF	(Republic of Ireland) IRL	Alan Cawley (was on loan to Longford Town)
—	DF	(Republic of Ireland) IRL	Kevin Doherty (was on loan to Waterford United)

No.	Pos.	Nation	Player
—	FW	(Republic of Ireland) IRL	Ger Rowe (was on loan to St. Patrick's Athletic)
—	MF	(Republic of Ireland) IRL	David Tyrrell (was on loan to Bray Wanderers)

== Results/League Tables ==
=== League of Ireland Premier Division ===
16 March 2005	Shelbourne	1–1	UCD	Tolka Park, Dublin
20.00 GMT	Stuart Byrne 85' (pen.)	Report	Damien Dupuy 63'	Attendance: 2,477; Referee: Paul Tuite (Dublin)

25 March 2005	Shamrock Rovers	0–2	Shelbourne	Dalymount Park, Dublin
19.45 GMT	Stephen Gough (penalty missed) 61' (pen.)	Report	Stuart Byrne 39'; Richie Baker 75'	Referee: Alan Kelly (Cork)

1 April 2005	Shelbourne	1–0	Waterford United	Tolka Park, Dublin
20.00 IST	Jason Byrne 16' (pen.); Richie Baker (red card) 7'	Report		Attendance: 2,583; Referee: John Feighery (Dublin)

8 April 2005	Derry City	0–0	Shelbourne	Brandywell Stadium, Derry
19.45 IST		Report		Referee: Pat Whelan (Dublin)

15 April 2005	Shelbourne	3–1	St. Patrick's Athletic	Tolka Park, Dublin
20.00 IST	Gary O'Neill 31'; Wes Hoolahan 45'; Stuart Byrne 69'; Colin Hawkins (red card) 89'	Report	Keith Dunne 36'	Attendance: 2,364; Referee: Ian Stokes (Dublin)

21 April 2005	Longford Town	0–2	Shelbourne	Flancare Park, Longford
19.45 IST		Report	Jason Byrne 13'; Richie Baker 21'	Referee: Damien Hancock (Dublin)

29 April 2005	Shelbourne	4–1	Bray Wanderers	Tolka Park, Dublin
20.00 IST	Richie Baker 5' 49'; Wes Hoolahan 45'; Jason Byrne 51'	Report	Éamon Zayed 28'	Attendance: 1,983; Referee: John Feighery (Dublin)

6 May 2005	Shelbourne	3–0	Finn Harps	Tolka Park, Dublin
20.00 IST	Jamie Harris 39'; Richie Baker 48'; Jason Byrne 90+1'	Report		Referee: Pat Whelan (Dublin)

13 May 2005	Drogheda United	0–0	Shelbourne	United Park, Drogheda
19.45 IST		Report		Referee: Ken Ginnett (Newtownabbey)

27 May 2005	Bohemians	2–1	Shelbourne	Dalymount Park, Dublin
19.45 IST	Gareth Farrelly 37'; Ken Oman 40'	Report	Alan Moore 18'	Attendance: 3,114; Referee: Alan Kelly (Cork)

30 May 2005	Shelbourne	0–2	Cork City	Tolka Park, Dublin
19.45 IST		Report	Roy O'Donovan 54'; Stephen Brennan 74' (o.g.)	Referee: Dave McKeon (Meath)

3 June 2005	UCD	1–1	Shelbourne	Belfield Park, Dublin
19.45 IST	Tony McDonnell 8'	Report	Glen Crowe 70'	Referee: Damien Hancock (Dublin)

17 June 2005	Shelbourne	1–2	Shamrock Rovers	Tolka Park, Dublin
20.00 IST	Dave Rogers 5'	Report	Dave Mooney 34'; Willo McDonagh 42'; Pat McCourt (penalty missed) 62' (pen.); Gavin McDonnell (red card) 64'; Willo McDonagh (red card) 89'	Attendance: 2,881; Referee: Dave McKeon (Meath)

24 June 2005	Waterford United	2–4	Shelbourne	R.S.C., Waterford
19.30 IST	Stephen Yelverton 12' 57'	Report	Glen Crowe 13'; Stuart Byrne 25'; Owen Heary 66'; Glen Fitzpatrick 90'	Referee: Alan Kelly (Cork)

27 June 2005	Shelbourne	1–0	Longford Town	Tolka Park, Dublin
20.00 IST	Jason Byrne 48'	Report		Attendance: 812; Referee: John Feighery (Dublin)

1 July 2005	Shelbourne	1–2	Derry City	Tolka Park, Dublin
20.00 IST	Jason Byrne 59'	Report	Killian Brennan 17'; Mark Farren 23'	Attendance: 1,145; Referee: Paul McKeon (Dublin)

8 July 2005	St. Patrick's Athletic	0–1	Shelbourne	Richmond Park, Dublin
19.45 IST		Report	Wes Hoolahan 45'; Richie Baker (red card) 90'	Attendance: 1,884; Referee: Declan Hanney (Dublin)

22 July 2005	Bray Wanderers	2–2	Shelbourne	Carlisle Grounds, Bray
19.45 IST	Éamon Zayed 66'; Colm Tresson 81'	Report	Owen Heary 6'; Glen Crowe 11'	Referee: Ian Stokes (Dublin)

8 August 2005	Shelbourne	3–3	Drogheda United	Tolka Park, Dublin
20.00 IST	Wes Hoolahan 3'; Stuart Byrne 14'; Jason Byrne 90+5'	Report	Jermaine Sandvliet 8'; Keith Fahey 29'; Declan O'Brien 88'	Referee: John Feighery (Dublin)

15 August 2005	Cork City	1–0	Shelbourne	Turners Cross, Cork
19.30 IST	Neal Horgan 24'	Report	Richie Baker (red card) 82'	Attendance: 5,379; Referee: Damien Hancock (Dublin)

19 August 2005	Shelbourne	2–1	Bohemians	Tolka Park, Dublin
20.00 IST	Jason Byrne 43' (pen.); Glen Crowe 71'	Report	Tony Grant 50'; Des Byrne (red card) 15'	Attendance: 3,321; Referee: Alan Kelly (Cork)

2 September 2005	Shelbourne	4–2	UCD	Tolka Park, Dublin
20.00 IST	Jason Byrne 14' 35' 73' (pen.); Owen Heary 80'	Report	Anto Murphy 15'; Pat McWalter 47'	Referee: Paul McKeon (Dublin)

9 September 2005	Shamrock Rovers	0–2	Shelbourne	Dalymount Park, Dublin
19.45 IST		Report	Joseph Ndo 45'; Jason Byrne 58' (pen.)	Attendance: 1,956; Referee: Alan Kelly (Cork)

16 September 2005	Shelbourne	5–0	Waterford United	Tolka Park, Dublin
20.00 IST	Gary O'Neill 16' 49'; Jason Byrne 27' 39' 45'	Report	Kevin Waters (red card) 50'	Referee: Hugo Whoriskey (Meath)

23 September 2005	Finn Harps	0–3	Shelbourne	Finn Park, Ballybofey
20.00 IST		Report	Gary O'Neill 45'; Jason Byrne 63'; Dave Rogers 90' (pen.)	Referee: Pat Whelan (Dublin)

30 September 2005	Derry City	2–1	Shelbourne	Brandywell Stadium, Derry
19.45 IST	Mark Farren 3'; Stephen O'Flynn 90+2'	Report	Glen Crowe 57'	Referee: Ian Stokes (Dublin)

7 October 2005	Shelbourne	1–0	St. Patrick's Athletic	Tolka Park, Dublin
20.00 IST	Gary O'Neill 75'	Report		Referee: Alan Kelly (Cork)

15 October 2005	Longford Town	0–2	Shelbourne	Flancare Park, Longford
19.30 IST		Report	Jason Byrne 7'; Gary O'Neill 26'	Referee: Declan Hanney (Dublin)

28 October 2005	Shelbourne	1–0	Finn Harps	Tolka Park, Dublin
20.00 IST	Jason Byrne 4'	Report		Referee: Anthony Buttimer (Cork)

31 October 2005	Shelbourne	5–0	Bray Wanderers	Tolka Park, Dublin
20.00 GMT	Jason Byrne 36' (pen.) 76' 77'; Dave Rogers 66'; Glen Crowe 79'	Report	Stephen Gifford (red card) 45'	Referee: Paul Tuite (Dublin)

4 November 2005	Drogheda United	0–2	Shelbourne	United Park, Drogheda
19.45 GMT		Report	Gary O'Neill 4'; Glen Crowe 80'	Referee: John Feighery (Dublin)

11 November 2005	Shelbourne	0–0	Cork City	Tolka Park, Dublin
20.00 GMT		Report		Referee: Damien Hancock (Dublin)

18 November 2005	Bohemians	0–3	Shelbourne	Dalymount Park, Dublin
19.45 GMT		Report	Richie Baker 53'; Jason Byrne 55'; Glen Crowe 65'	Referee: Ian Stokes (Dublin)

==== Final league table ====
Pos	Team	Pld	W	D	L	GF	GA	GD	Pts	Qualification or relegation
1	Cork City (C)	33	22	8	3	53	18	+35	74	Qualification to Champions League first qualifying round
2	Derry City	33	22	6	5	56	25	+31	72	Qualification to UEFA Cup first qualifying round
3	Shelbourne	33	20	7	6	62	25	+37	67	Qualification to Intertoto Cup first round
4	Drogheda United	33	12	12	9	40	33	+7	48	Qualification to UEFA Cup first qualifying round (Note: Drogheda United qualified for the UEFA Cup first qualifying round after winning the 2005 FAI Cup Final.)
5	Longford Town	33	12	9	12	29	32	−3	45	

(C) Champions

==== League Results summary ====
Overall								Home						Away					
Pld	W	D	L	GF	GA	GD	Pts	W	D	L	GF	GA	GD	W	D	L	GF	GA	GD
33	20	7	6	62	25	+37	67	11	3	3	36	15	+21	9	4	3	26	10	+16

Last updated: 18 November 2005.
Source: League of Ireland Premier Division Fixtures

==== League Form/Results by Round ====
Round	1	2	3	4	5	6	7	8	9	10	11	12	13	14	15	16	17	18	19	20	21	22	23	24	25	26	27	28	29	30	31	32	33
Ground	H	A	H	A	H	A	H	H	A	A	H	A	H	A	H	H	A	A	H	A	H	H	A	H	A	A	H	A	H	H	A	H	A
Result	D	W	W	D	W	W	W	W	D	L	L	D	L	W	W	L	W	D	D	L	W	W	W	W	W	L	W	W	W	W	W	D	W

Updated to match(es) played on 18 November 2005. Source: League of Ireland Premier Division Fixtures
A = Away; H = Home; W = Win; D = Draw; L = Loss

=== UEFA Champions League ===
==== First Qualifying Round ====
13 July 2005	Glentoran	1–2	Shelbourne	The Oval, Belfast
19.00 IST	Sean Ward 77'	Report	Jason Byrne 55' 65' (pen.)	Referee: Georgios Kaznaferis (Greece)

20 July 2005	Shelbourne	4–1	Glentoran	Tolka Park, Dublin
19.30 IST	Owen Heary 13'; Jason Byrne 31' (pen.) 71'; Glen Crowe 58'	Report	Peter McCann 20'; Paul Leeman (red card) 30'	Referee: Peter Sippel (Germany)

Shelbourne won 6 – 2 on aggregate

==== Second Qualifying Round ====
27 July 2005	Shelbourne	0–0	Steaua Bucharest	Tolka Park, Dublin
19.30 IST		Report		Referee: Romans Lajuks (Latvia)

3 August 2005	Steaua Bucharest	4–1	Shelbourne	Stadionul Ghencea, Bucharest
18.30 IST	Bănel Nicoliţă 18'; Victoraş Iacob 28'; Laurenţiu Diniţă 61'; Daniel Opriţa 90+5' (pen.); Nicolae Dică (red card) 4'; Laurenţiu Diniţă (red card) 87'	Report	Jason Byrne 39'; Dave Rogers (red card) 4'	Referee: Claude Colombo (France)

Steaua Bucharest won 4 – 1 on aggregate

=== FAI Carlsberg Cup ===
==== Second Round ====
10 June 2005	Shelbourne	0–2	Derry City	Tolka Park, Dublin
19.45 IST	David Crawley (penalty missed) 55' (pen.)	Report	Gary Beckett 6'; Clive Delaney 22'	Referee: Alan Kelly (Cork)

=== eircom League Cup ===
==== Second Round ====
21 June 2005	Shelbourne	2–1	Kildare County	Tolka Park, Dublin
20.00 IST	Glen Crowe 23' 56'	Report	Alan McNevin 72' (pen.)	Referee: Ian Stokes (Dublin)

==== Quarter-Finals ====
4 July 2005	Shelbourne	2–1	St. Patrick's Athletic	Tolka Park, Dublin
20.00 IST	Glen Crowe 9'; Jason Byrne 27'	Report	Robbie Doyle 82'	Referee: Pat Whelan (Dublin)

==== Semi-Finals ====
22 August 2005	Shelbourne	1–2	UCD	Tolka Park, Dublin
20.00 IST	Colin Hawkins 85'	Report	Brian Gannon 90'; Robbie Martin 90+4'	Referee: Declan Hanney (Dublin)

=== Setanta Cup ===
==== Group 2 ====
22 March 2005	Shelbourne	3–3	Portadown	Tolka Park, Dublin
19.15 GMT	Richie Baker 39' 69'; Jason Byrne 44'	Report	Gary Hamilton 50' 60'; Wesley Boyle 84'	Referee: Paul McKeon (Dublin)

28 March 2005	Cork City	1–0	Shelbourne	Turners Cross, Cork
19.15 IST	Denis Behan 59'; Joe Gamble (red card) 85'	Report	David Crawley (red card) 90+2'	Referee: David Malcolm (Bangor)

25 April 2005	Portadown	0–1	Shelbourne	Shamrock Park, Portadown
19.15 IST	Cullen Feeney (red card) 54'	Report	Jason Byrne 3'	Referee: David Best (Carnmoney)

2 May 2005	Shelbourne	1–0	Cork City	Tolka Park, Dublin
19.15 IST	Jamie Harris 52'	Report		Referee: Mark Courtney (Dungannon)

===== Group 2 table =====
Pos	Team	Pld	W	D	L	GF	GA	GD	Pts	Qualification
1	(Republic of Ireland) Shelbourne (A)	4	2	1	1	5	4	+1	7	Advanced to final
2	(Northern Ireland) Portadown	4	1	2	1	5	5	0	5	
3	(Republic of Ireland) Cork City	4	1	1	2	2	3	−1	4	

(A) Advance to a further round

==== Final ====
21 May 2005	Shelbourne	0–2	Linfield	Tolka Park, Dublin
19.30 IST	Alan Moore (red card) 90+3'	Report	Glenn Ferguson 26'; Peter Thompson 37'	Referee: Mark Courtney (Dungannon)

== 2005 Season Statistics ==
=== Player Appearances/Goals ===
As of November 18, 2005.

No.	Pos	Nat	Player	Total		League		Cup	
No.	Pos	Nat	Player	Apps	Goals	Apps	Goals	Apps	Goals
	MF	(Republic of Ireland) IRL	Richie Baker	33	8	21	6	12	2
	DF	(Republic of Ireland) IRL	Stephen Brennan	5	0	3	0	2	0
	FW	(Republic of Ireland) IRL	Jason Byrne	43	30	31	22	12	8
	MF	(Republic of Ireland) IRL	Stuart Byrne	38	5	25	5	13	0
	MF	(Republic of Ireland) IRL	Ollie Cahill	44	0	31	0	13	0
	MF	(Republic of Ireland) IRL	Alan Cawley	7	0	4	0	3	0
	MF	(Republic of Ireland) IRL	James Chambers	3	0	3	0	0	0
	MF	(Republic of Ireland) IRL	Jim Crawford	29	0	22	0	7	0
	DF	(Republic of Ireland) IRL	David Crawley	28	0	16	0	12	0
	FW	(Republic of Ireland) IRL	Glen Crowe	38	12	27	8	11	4
	GK	(Republic of Ireland) IRL	Dean Delany	26	0	20	0	6	0
	DF	(Republic of Ireland) IRL	Kevin Doherty	0	0	0	0	0	0
	FW	(Republic of Ireland) IRL	Glen Fitzpatrick	18	1	13	1	5	0
	DF	(Republic of Ireland) IRL	Curtis Fleming	12	0	10	0	2	0
	DF	(Wales) WAL	Jamie Harris	19	2	14	1	5	1
	DF	(Republic of Ireland) IRL	Colin Hawkins	35	1	26	0	9	1
	DF	(Republic of Ireland) IRL	Owen Heary	41	4	30	3	11	1
	MF	(Republic of Ireland) IRL	Wes Hoolahan	38	4	29	4	9	0
	MF	(Republic of Ireland) IRL	Brian King	0	0	0	0	0	0
	MF	(Republic of Ireland) IRL	Alan Moore	24	1	16	1	8	0
	MF	(Cameroon) CMR	Joseph Ndo	25	1	19	1	6	0
	FW	(Republic of Ireland) IRL	Gary O'Neill	22	7	18	7	4	0
	MF	(Republic of Ireland) IRL	Alan Reynolds	5	0	4	0	1	0
	DF	(England) ENG	Dave Rogers	44	3	31	3	13	0
	FW	(Republic of Ireland) IRL	Ger Rowe	0	0	0	0	0	0
	MF	(Republic of Ireland) IRL	Bobby Ryan	31	0	24	0	7	0
	MF	(Republic of Ireland) IRL	David Tyrrell	0	0	0	0	0	0
	GK	(Wales) WAL	Steve Williams	20	0	13	0	7	0
	MF	(Republic of Ireland) IRL	Hussain Yazdani	0	0	0	0	0	0

=== Top Goalscorers ===
Position	Goalscorer	Total Goals	League Goals	Cup Goals
1	(Republic of Ireland) Jason Byrne	30	22	8
2	(Republic of Ireland) Glen Crowe	12	8	4
3	(Republic of Ireland) Richie Baker	8	6	2
4	(Republic of Ireland) Gary O'Neill	7	7	0
5	(Republic of Ireland) Stuart Byrne	5	5	0
6	(Republic of Ireland) Owen Heary	4	3	1
6	(Republic of Ireland) Wes Hoolahan	4	4	0
8	(England) Dave Rogers	3	3	0
9	(Wales) Jamie Harris	2	1	1
10	(Republic of Ireland) Glen Fitzpatrick	1	1	0
10	(Republic of Ireland) Colin Hawkins	1	0	1
10	(Republic of Ireland) Alan Moore	1	1	0
10	(Cameroon) Joseph Ndo	1	1	0
