= 2005 League of Ireland Premier Division =

League of Ireland Premier Division
- Season: 2005
- Champions: Cork City (2nd title)
- Relegated: Shamrock Rovers; Finn Harps
- UEFA Champions League: Cork City
- UEFA Cup: Derry City; Drogheda United
- UEFA Intertoto Cup: Shelbourne
- Setanta Sports Cup: Cork City; Derry City; Drogheda United; Shelbourne
- Top goalscorer: Jason Byrne: 22 (Shelbourne)
- Highest attendance: 7,000 Cork City F.C. 1–0 Derry City F.C.

The 2005 League of Ireland Premier Division was the 21st season of the League of Ireland Premier Division. The division was made up of 12 teams. Cork City were champions while Derry City finished as runners-up. This was the first time the title had been won by a club from outside County Dublin since 1996–97.

== Overview ==
The regular season began on 16 March and ended on 18 November. Each team played three rounds of games, totalling 33 games each. The season witnessed a decline in the fortunes of one of the League of Ireland's oldest surviving members. In April Shamrock Rovers entered examinership and it was revealed that the club had debts of nearly €3 million. It was also discovered that Rovers were not playing PAYE and PRSI. As a result of these financial irregularities, Rovers were deducted eight points. This ultimately resulted in the club being relegated to the First Division after they lost the relegation/promotion playoff to Dublin City. This was the first time Rovers' senior team had dropped out of the top level of the Republic of Ireland football league system since the club had joined the League of Ireland in 1922–23.

Going into the final month of the league season only goal difference could separate leaders Cork City from second placed Derry City and title would be decided on the final day of the season when the two met at Turner's Cross on 18 November. Derry City went top of the table after Cork City's draw with Shelbourne the previous weekend. All they needed was a point to seal their first league title since 1996–97. Cork City started the better and nearly scored inside thirty seconds when John O'Flynn headed just over the crossbar. They were not to be denied however, and struck the deserved lead goal when O'Flynn headed home from a Roy O'Donovan cross. Cork City dominated the rest of the opening half but it seemed that the second killer goal would just not come. It eventually arrived in the 16th minute of the second half when Denis Behan set up Liam Kearney to score. Derry City never gave up, however, and were close to pulling a goal back but Michael Devine managed to pull off a fine save from a Pat McCourt header. It was to be Cork City's day, though, as they went on to see the match out and clinch their second league title.

== Final table ==
Pos	Team	Pld	W	D	L	GF	GA	GD	Pts	Qualification or relegation
1	Cork City (C)	33	22	8	3	53	18	+35	74	Qualification to Champions League first qualifying round
2	Derry City	33	22	6	5	56	25	+31	72	Qualification to UEFA Cup first qualifying round
3	Shelbourne	33	20	7	6	62	25	+37	67	Qualification to Intertoto Cup first round
4	Drogheda United	33	12	12	9	40	33	+7	48	Qualification to UEFA Cup first qualifying round (Note: Drogheda United qualified for the UEFA Cup first qualifying round after winning the 2005 FAI Cup Final.)
5	Longford Town	33	12	9	12	29	32	−3	45	
6	Bohemians	33	13	6	14	42	47	−5	45	
7	Bray Wanderers	33	11	6	16	40	57	−17	39	
8	Waterford United	33	9	7	17	30	49	−19	34	
9	UCD	33	7	12	14	28	44	−16	33	
10	St Patrick's Athletic	33	7	11	15	26	36	−10	32	
11	Shamrock Rovers (Note: Shamrock Rovers deducted 8 points for financial irregularities.) (R)	33	9	8	16	33	52	−19	27	Qualification to Relegation play-off
12	Finn Harps (R)	33	5	6	22	30	51	−21	21	Relegation to League of Ireland First Division

(C) Champions; (R) Relegated

== Results ==
=== Matches 1–22 ===
Home \ Away	BOH	BRW	COR	DER	DRO	FHA	LON	SHM	SHE	StP	UCD	WAT
Bohemians	—	1–0	0–2	0–1	3–2	1–0	2–0	1–1	0–3	1–1	1–1	2–1
Bray Wanderers	1–2	—	1–2	0–1	2–2	2–1	1–1	2–3	2–2	2–1	1–0	2–1
Cork City	2–1	1–1	—	2–0	0–1	2–0	0–0	3–0	1–0	3–1	0–0	1–0
Derry City	3–1	2–2	3–1	—	3–0	3–2	1–0	2–3	0–0	2–2	3–0	1–0
Drogheda United	2–2	3–0	0–1	0–2	—	1–0	1–1	2–1	0–0	1–1	1–2	1–0
Finn Harps	1–3	1–2	0–2	0–2	0–0	—	0–0	1–1	0–3	0–2	1–0	2–0
Longford Town	1–0	2–1	0–1	0–0	1–1	1–0	—	2–1	0–2	1–0	1–0	1–2
Shamrock Rovers	1–2	3–2	1–3	0–2	1–0	1–4	0–2	—	0–2	0–0	1–0	0–0
Shelbourne	2–1	4–1	0–2	1–2	3–3	3–0	1–0	1–2	—	3–1	1–1	1–0
St Patrick's Athletic	0–0	2–0	0–2	1–1	0–2	2–0	1–3	1–1	0–1	—	3–2	1–0
UCD	1–1	3–2	1–5	1–0	0–2	1–1	0–0	2–2	1–1	1–0	—	1–0
Waterford United	2–0	1–2	2–2	1–3	1–0	2–1	0–3	0–1	2–4	1–0	0–0	—

Legend: Blue = home team win; Yellow = draw; Red = away team win.

=== Matches 23–33 ===
Home \ Away	BOH	BRW	COR	DER	DRO	FHA	LON	SHM	SHE	StP	UCD	WAT
Bohemians	—	—	1–2	2–3	—	3–1	1–0	1–3	2–1	—	—	—
Bray Wanderers	3–1	—	—	0–3	0–2	—	—	—	—	1–0	0–1	1–0
Cork City	—	3–0	—	2–0	1–0	—	—	—	—	0–1	1–0	—
Derry City	—	—	—	—	—	—	3–1	2–0	2–1	2–0	—	0–1
Drogheda United	3–2	—	—	1–1	—	2–0	—	0–0	0–2	1–1	—	—
Finn Harps	—	2–4	1–2	0–1	—	—	5–0	3–0	—	—	1–2	—
Longford Town	—	1–1	0–0	—	0–1	—	—	—	0–2	—	1–0	3–0
Shamrock Rovers	—	0–1	0–2	—	—	—	4–2	—	0–2	—	—	1–2
Shelbourne	—	5–0	0–0	—	—	1–0	—	—	—	1–0	4–2	5–0
St Patrick's Athletic	0–1	—	—	—	—	0–0	0–1	3–1	—	—	0–0	—
UCD	1–3	—	—	0–2	2–2	—	—	0–0	—	—	—	2–3
Waterford United	2–0	—	2–2	—	0–3	2–2	—	—	—	1–1	—	—

Legend: Blue = home team win; Yellow = draw; Red = away team win.

== Promotion/relegation play-off ==
Shamrock Rovers who finished eleventh in the Premier Division played off against Dublin City who finished second in the First Division.

1st Leg

22 November 2005	Shamrock Rovers	1–2	Dublin City	Dalymount Park
	Molloy 58' (pen.)		Lynch 45'; McGill 86'

2nd Leg

25 November 2005	Dublin City	1–1	Shamrock Rovers	Tolka Park
	Collins 55'		Tracey 57'

Dublin City win 3–2 on aggregate and are promoted to the Premier Division.

== UEFA Coefficient ==
The League of Ireland Premier Division clubs' performances in Europe this season meant that the league received a coefficient of 1.833 added to their overall coefficient which now accumulated to 4.331. This gave them a ranking 40th place as shown.

- 38. Belarus
- 39. Liechtenstein
- 40. Republic of Ireland
- 41. Albania
- 42. Armenia

== Top-scorers ==
Player	Club	League goals	Cup goals	Total
(Republic of Ireland) Jason Byrne	Shelbourne	22	8	30
(Republic of Ireland) Mark Farren	Derry City	18	4	22
(Republic of Ireland) John O'Flynn	Cork City	11	4	15
(Republic of Ireland) Kevin McHugh	Finn Harps	13	1	14
(Libya) Eamon Zayed	Bray Wanderers	12	0	12
(Republic of Ireland) Glen Crowe	Shelbourne	8	4	12

== Awards ==
- PFAI Players' Player of the Year
  - Mark Farren - Derry City
- PFAI Young Player of the Year
  - Paddy McCourt - Derry City

== Prize money ==
The prize funds for the season more than quadrupled. The top clubs also got a financial from the Setanta Cup. The following table shows how eircom League prize money was distributed for the season.

Position	Premier Division	First Division	League Cup	Fair Play
1	€100,000	€25,000	€15,000	€4,500 x 2
2	€45,000	€12,500	€7,500	€2,000 x 2
3	€25,000	€7,500	€2,500	
4	€15,000	€6,000	€2,500	
5	€10,000	€5,000		
6	€7,500	€5,000		
7	€6,000	€5,000		
8	€5,000	€5,000		
9	€5,000	€5,000		
10	€5,000	€5,000		
11	€5,000			
12	€5,000			
Totals	€233,500	€81,000	€27,500	€13,000

== Attendances ==
Attendance figures increased this season in relation to previous seasons. The total attendance over all competitions for the season was 520,000 - a 6% increase on the previous season. The highest league attendance of the season came at Turner's Cross for the title decider at the end of the season between Cork City and Derry City. 8,000 spectators were at the game.

== Media coverage ==
The FAI agreed a new TV Rights deal for this season. This deal will run until 2009. The main terms of the agreement are:

- At least 29 games live each season
  - RTÉ 8 matches (5 league and 3 FAI Cup)
  - TG4 11 (7 league and 5 FAI Cup)
  - Setanta 10 (all league)
- This allowed the increase in prize money.
- Home clubs in 17 live games will receive €5,000
- Home clubs in other 12 live matches will get €2,000.

TV viewing figures for the season proved to be in excess of 1 million. In the end 44 matches were televised live with the highest viewing figure of 355,000 for the league title decider.

== See also ==
- 2005 Shelbourne F.C. season
- 2005 League of Ireland First Division
- 2005 League of Ireland Cup
