= Greg O'Halloran =

Irish footballer

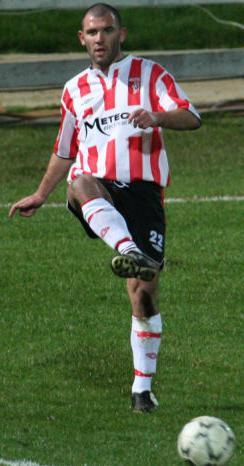
- O'Halloran in action for Derry City

Personal information
- Full name: Gregory O'Halloran
- Date of birth: 6 September 1980 (age 46)
- Place of birth: Cork, Ireland
- Positions: Centre back; defensive midfielder

Youth career
- Crosshaven AFC
- Leeds United

Senior career*
Years	Team	Apps	(Gls)
1997–1998	Hull City		
1998–2005	Cork City		
2001–2002	→ Longford Town (loan)		
2006	Shelbourne	15	(2)
2007	Derry City	6	(0)
2007–2008	Galway United	12	(0)
2008	→ Shelbourne (loan)	13	(0)
2008	Cobh Ramblers	13	(1)
2009–2011	Cork City	87	(4)

International career
2000	Republic of Ireland U21	2	(0)
- * Club domestic league appearances and goals

Greg O'Halloran (born 6 September 1980) is an Irish former professional footballer. O'Halloran was primarily a central midfielder but has also played regularly in defence. He was assistant manager to Tommy Dunne in the Cork City set-up in 2010. He has six Munster Senior Cup medals to his name, as well as two League of Ireland Premier Division titles.

== Career ==
=== Club career ===
The well travelled O'Halloran joined Galway United in July 2007, signing from Derry City whom he had joined only a few months earlier in February 2007; this was after a year-long spell with Shelbourne where he won a League winners medal. The player had joined Shelbourne in December 2005 after spending eight seasons at Cork City. Having spent the beginning of his career at Crosshaven AFC, he moved to Leeds United and then to Hull City before moving to his home country.

Formerly a captain with Cork City, he has previously had a loan spell at Longford Town, before speculation of a move to Waterford United was quashed following his move to Shelbourne.

O'Halloran rejoined former club Shelbourne on loan from Galway United for the first half of 2008 season. O'Halloran was on the Galway United transfer list from 1 July 2008 when his loan period with Shelbourne ended. He immediately joined Cobh Ramblers in July 2008 for the remainder of the 2008 season.

On 2 March 2010, it was confirmed that he would sign for Cork City and would act as player/assistant manager for the club signing a one-year contract. In October 2010 he signed a new contract with City, but will not be continuing in his role as assistant manager so that he can concentrate on playing. Greg was named as club captain of Cork City in February 2011. In Jan 2012 Greg returned to his native Crosshaven where he was player-manager of the Crosshaven AFC Senior team.

By February 2022, O’Halloran was playing with and managing Carrigaline United in the Munster Senior League.

=== International career ===
O'Halloran has two Irish Under-21 caps under his belt – against Ghana and Portugal. Represented his country at the UEFA U-19 Championship in Sweden in 1999 where he won a bronze medal .

== Honours ==
- League of Ireland: 2
  - Cork City – 2005
  - Shelbourne – 2006
