= Ciarán Martyn =

Irish footballer

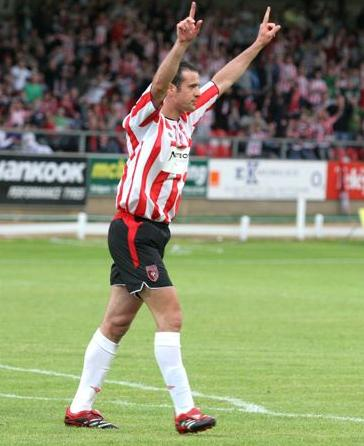

Personal information
- Date of birth: 25 March 1980 (age 46)
- Place of birth: Sligo, Ireland
- Position: Midfielder

Youth career
- Sligo Rovers

Senior career*
Years	Team	Apps	(Gls)
1997–2002	UCD	130	(17)
2002–2009	Derry City	214	(36)
2007	→ Fredrikstad (loan)	6	(0)
2010–2012	Glentoran	47	(11)
2012–2017	Glenavon	110	(33)
2017–2018	Ballinamallard United	13	(0)
- * Club domestic league appearances and goals

Ciarán Martyn (born 25 March 1980) is an Irish retired footballer who last played as a midfielder for Ballinamallard United of the NIFL Premiership.

== Career ==
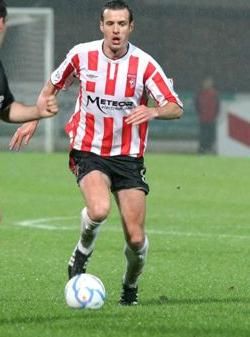
Martyn in action against his home-town club, Sligo Rovers, during the 2006 season

Born in Sligo, Ireland, Martyn started his career at U.C.D. where he scored in a 2000 UEFA Intertoto Cup clash with PFC Velbazhd Kyustendil.

Martyn played with Derry City from 2002 until his loan move to Fredrikstad F.K. in 2007. He is one of the few players (if not the only one) who have paid to play for Derry City. Having signed a pre-contract with Shelbourne a number of seasons ago, he changed his mind and was forced to pay £8,000 to escape the agreement. An attacking midfielder with an eye for goal, the Sligo man moved to Derry to show his commitment to the club.

In August 2006 Martyn scored twice in the 2006–07 UEFA Cup win over Gretna F.C. In November 2006 he made his 200th appearance for the club when he was brought on as a 60th-minute substitute against Cork City FC in the Brandywell. This made him the 16th player to reach this milestone since Derry's inception to the League of Ireland in 1985. He finished the 2006 season as Derry's second-highest scorer with 15 goals scored in total. This tally included 8 goals scored in the Premier Division and another 7 scored in the cup competitions.

Signed from UCD by Kevin Mahon, Martyn has played at numerous under-age levels for the Republic of Ireland.

On 31 March 2007, Martyn signed an agreement to be hired out to Norwegian top division team Fredrikstad F.K. until July 2007.

Following financial difficulties at the Brandywell, it was announced on 19 January 2010 that Martyn had left Derry City and signed for Glentoran.

Martyn suffered a tricky first year and a half at Glentoran due to long-term injuries. When he was fit to play he was approved by the supporters of Glentoran. Martyn scored on his Glentoran debut against Coleraine; however, the Glens were defeated 4–3 at the Coleraine Showgrounds.

He also gave Glentoran the lead at Windsor Park against Coleraine in the C.I.S. Final win under manager Scott Young.

He scored a vital away goal in Glentoran's 1–0 win over Glenavon at Mourneview.

He took a four figure pay cut for Glentoran under manager Scott Young. This was first announced in an edition of the Glentoran Gazette match day magazine.

Martyn was issued the number six jersey at Glentoran for the 2011/12 season.

He was released from Glentoran on 24 May 2012.

He then joined Glenavon on a short-term contract in November 2012 before signing a one-and-a-half-year deal with the club on 8 December.

Martyn featured when Glenavon beat Ballymena United 2–1 in the 2014 Irish Cup final, he also played in the 2016 final, in which Glenavon defeated Linfield 2–0.

== Personal life ==
He is a first cousin of British 400m runner Martyn Rooney.

== Honours ==
UCD

- FAI Super Cup (1): 2000–01

Derry City

- FAI Cup (1): 2006
- League of Ireland Cup (4): 2005, 2006, 2007, 2008

Glentoran

- Northern Ireland Football League Cup (1): 2009–10

Glenavon

- Irish Cup (2): 2013–14, 2015–16

Preceded by Incumbent	UCD Supporters' Player of the Year; 2000	Succeeded by Clive Delaney
