= Paddy McCourt =

Northern Irish footballer

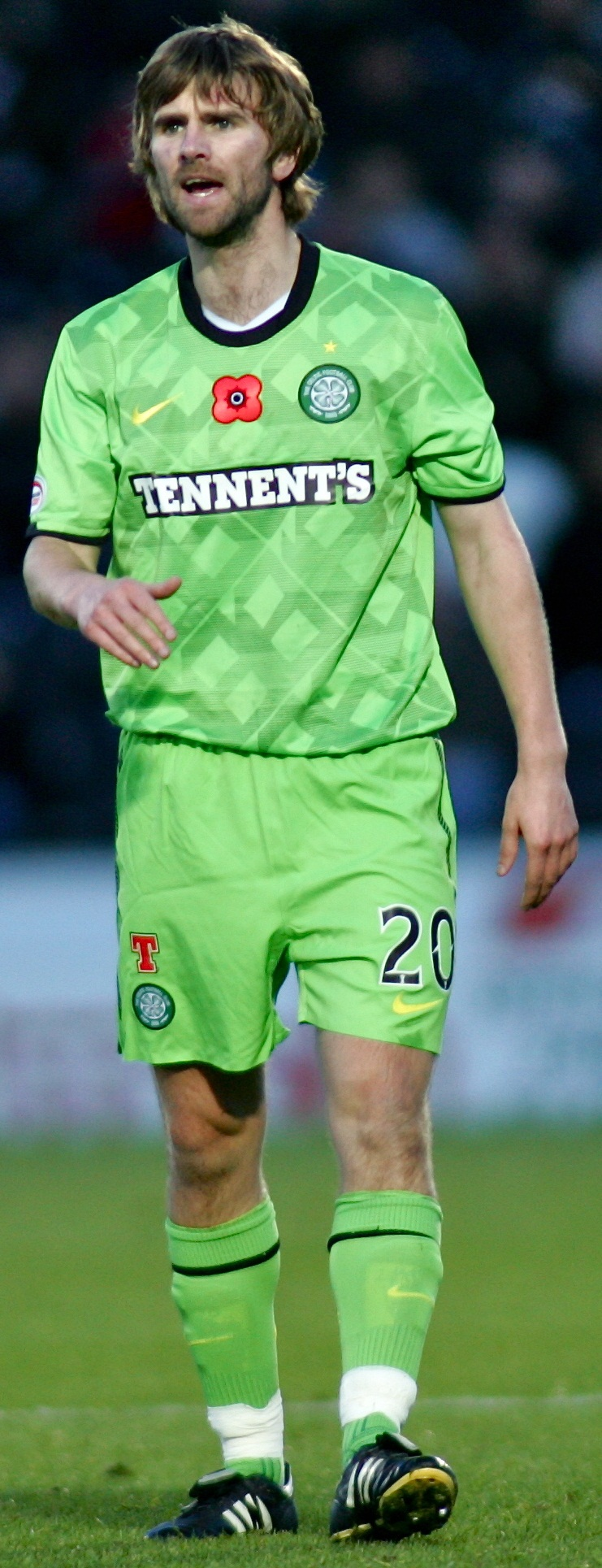
- McCourt playing for Celtic in 2010

Personal information
- Full name: Patrick James McCourt
- Date of birth: 16 December 1983 (age 42)
- Place of birth: Derry, Northern Ireland
- Height: 5 ft 10 in (1.78 m)
- Position: Winger

Youth career
- 1998–2000: Foyle Harps
- 2000–2001: Rochdale

Senior career*
Years	Team	Apps	(Gls)
2001–2005	Rochdale	80	(8)
2005	Shamrock Rovers	17	(7)
2005–2008	Derry City	60	(5)
2008–2013	Celtic	66	(9)
2013–2014	Barnsley	23	(2)
2014–2015	Brighton & Hove Albion	10	(0)
2015	→ Notts County (loan)	12	(1)
2015–2016	Luton Town	24	(1)
2016	Glenavon	12	(1)
2017–2018	Finn Harps	48	(5)
Total		352	(39)

International career
2002–2005	Northern Ireland U21	9	(0)
2009	Northern Ireland B	1	(0)
2002–2015	Northern Ireland	18	(2)

Managerial career
- 2024–: Glentoran (assistant)
- * Club domestic league appearances and goals

Patrick James McCourt (born 16 December 1983) is a Northern Irish former footballer who played as a left winger for Northern Ireland

He started his professional career with Third Division club Rochdale in 2001 before moving to League of Ireland club Shamrock Rovers in 2005. Later that year he moved to his hometown club, Derry City, where he won the League of Ireland Cup three times in 2005, 2006 and 2007, and the FAI Cup in 2006. At Derry, he gained the nickname "The Derry Pelé" for his skilful play. In 2008 he signed for Scottish Premier League club Celtic; the club he supported as a boy. In a five-season spell there, he won the Scottish Cup in 2011 and 2013 and the SPL title in 2011–12 and 2012–13. Despite being a fan favourite at the club, he failed to gain a regular first-team place and was released in June 2013.

McCourt then signed a one-year contract at Championship club Barnsley, though the club was relegated during the 2013–14 season and McCourt was released. He signed a one-year deal with Brighton & Hove Albion for the following campaign, but featured little and joined League One club Notts County on loan for the final third of the season. He left Brighton and in July 2015 signed for League Two club Luton Town on a two-year contract. He was released by mutual consent halfway through to enable him to return to Northern Ireland, where he signed a one-year contract with NIFL Premiership club Glenavon. He left by mutual agreement in December 2016, and the following March he signed for League of Ireland side Finn Harps, where he retired in 2018.

McCourt made his Northern Ireland international debut in 2002, but did not play again until 2009. He scored his first two goals against the Faroe Islands in 2011.

== Early life ==
McCourt was born in Derry, Northern Ireland, and educated at Steelstown Primary School.

== Club career ==
=== Rochdale ===
McCourt began his career with an early move from Derry-based youth club Foyle Harps to English Third Division club Rochdale on a youth contract in 2000. He made his first-team debut in the Football League Trophy on 16 October 2001 and his potential prompted his signing to the Spotland club on a three-and-a-half-year professional contract in December 2001. His first season ended with four goals in 23 appearances, and making 30 appearances in 2002–03. His skillful playing style attracted the attention of Premier League clubs Blackburn Rovers and Manchester City.

In the 2003–04 season, McCourt managed just a handful of starts for the club and had two spells away on trial with First Division clubs Norwich City and Crewe Alexandra, though neither club followed up their initial interest in him. A combination of injuries and loss of form hastened his departure from Rochdale in February 2005.

After Rochdale manager Steve Parkin informed him that he was to be released, McCourt headed for another trial, this time with Scottish Premier League outfit Motherwell. However, after two weeks at Fir Park a move failed to take place.

=== Shamrock Rovers ===
In March 2005, McCourt was signed by Roddy Collins, manager of League of Ireland club Shamrock Rovers. McCourt scored three goals in his first six appearances for the Dublin club and topped the goalscoring charts by May 2005. As the club ran into financial difficulty, mainly due to the costs surrounding the building of Tallaght Stadium, Rovers were forced to place all players except McCourt on the transfer list. After seven goals in 17 appearances, and following interest from Bristol City and Queens Park Rangers, the club, in dire need of funds, decided to sell McCourt. He was signed by his home-town club, Derry City, for a fee thought to be around £60,000. Despite leaving the club halfway through the season, McCourt was their top goalscorer that season and won the Professional Footballers Association of Ireland Young Player of the Year award.

=== Derry City ===
Despite interest from Scottish side Livingston, McCourt signed for Derry City in 2005. In his first few months at the club, McCourt helped Derry City to the League of Ireland Cup and runners-up in the league in 2005. In the 2006 season, he played in Derry's UEFA Cup run, in which the club eventually lost to French giants Paris Saint-Germain, and helped them to win a cup double with victories in both the FAI Cup and League of Ireland Cup finals. McCourt scored four goals in 25 appearances in the 2007 season and won a third League of Ireland Cup medal. His performances interested English club West Bromwich Albion and Derry announced in June 2008 that they had reached an agreement with the newly promoted Premier League club. However, Derry also agreed a fee with Scottish Premier League club Celtic, leaving McCourt to make his choice.

=== Celtic ===
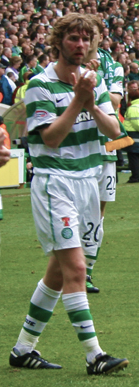
McCourt at Celtic Park

The lure of joining Celtic, the club he had supported as a boy, persuaded McCourt to move to Glasgow and, on 19 June 2008, he signed for a fee of £200,000 after agreeing a three-year contract. The manager who signed him, Gordon Strachan, would later claim that McCourt was "as gifted a footballer as I have ever seen."

McCourt made his competitive debut for Celtic on 25 October 2008 in a 4–2 win over Hibernian. In his first season, he featured primarily for the Celtic reserve team, playing in the deciding game on 28 April 2009 against Rangers reserves to clinch the Reserve League title for the eighth season in succession.

On 23 September 2009, McCourt opened his goalscoring account for Celtic with a memorable goal in a League Cup match at Falkirk, in which he beat five defenders before chipping the ball over goalkeeper Bobby Olejnik. He then scored his first Scottish Premier League goal on his first league start three days later against St Mirren, which saw him go past six defenders before beating the goalkeeper. On 24 January 2010, McCourt bagged his second league goal for Celtic against St Johnstone after a mazy run and finish into the top right hand corner, from just inside the penalty box. Premier League newcomers Blackpool expressed an interest in McCourt following his performances throughout the 2009–10 season, prompting Celtic to offer him an improved contract, which he duly signed.

In the first game of the 2010–11 season, McCourt scored the only goal of the game against newly promoted Inverness Caledonian Thistle with a now-typical solo run and shot, beating three defenders and then netting from the edge of the box. He scored his second goal of the season, his first at Celtic Park in Celtic's 3–0 victory over Hearts on 11 September 2010, beating three players before chipping the goalkeeper. On 6 November 2010, McCourt netted the final goal of Celtic's 9–0 demolition of Aberdeen. Later that month, he scored Celtic's 600th home SPL goal in a 2–2 draw with Inverness at Celtic Park, with another jinking run and precise finish. On 29 December 2010, McCourt scored the winning goal in a 1–0 win over Motherwell. On 26 January 2011, McCourt added another SPL goal in a 4–0 win over Hearts. He came on as a substitute in the 2011 Scottish Cup Final on 21 May 2011, a 3–0 win over Motherwell, to win his first silverware in Scotland. In August 2011, it was reported that Liverpool was interested in signing McCourt.

McCourt was mainly used as a late substitute over the course of the next two seasons, failing to score a single goal, though he was part of the Celtic team that won both the 2011–12 and 2012–13 SPL titles, as well as the 2013 Scottish Cup. In the final at Hampden Park, a 3–0 victory over Hibernian, he entered play as a substitute and was handed the captain's armband in what proved to be his final appearance for the club. McCourt left Celtic after his contract expired in June 2013, having played in a total of 88 games, scoring ten goals. On 6 August 2013, he began training with Hibernian to try and win a contract, but no move materialised.

=== Barnsley ===
On 22 August 2013, McCourt signed for Championship club Barnsley, managed by his former Rochdale teammate David Flitcroft, on a one-year deal. He made his debut on 21 September 2013 at home to Watford. He played in 23 league games for the club, scoring twice, before being released at the end of the season. One goal, which opened the scoring in Barnsley's 3–2 victory over Middlesbrough, saw McCourt guide the ball into the box and take out six opposition players, before finishing past the goalkeeper from the six-yard line. The goal was shortlisted for the Football League Goal of the Year award, though lost to Franck Moussa's chip for Coventry City against Leyton Orient.

=== Brighton & Hove Albion ===
On 19 August 2014, McCourt signed a one-year contract with Championship club Brighton & Hove Albion. He found his playing time limited and subsequently joined Notts County on loan on 21 February 2015 until the end of the 2014–15 season. McCourt made 12 appearances for the club and scored once.

In April 2015, Brighton confirmed that McCourt, who made 13 appearances for the club during the 2014–15 season would not be offered a new contract.

=== Luton Town ===
On 1 July 2015, McCourt joined League Two club Luton Town on a two-year contract.

McCourt made 25 appearances, scoring one goal during the 2015–16 season, but was released from his contract one year early on 24 May 2016 to enable him to return to Northern Ireland.

=== Glenavon ===
McCourt signed a one-year contract with NIFL Premiership club Glenavon on 19 July 2016. He made his home debut on 30 July 2016 as Glenavon earned a 1–0 win over Crusaders to win the NIFL Charity Shield. His league debut came one week later in a 4–0 home win over Carrick Rangers on the opening day of the 2016–17 season, but was substituted in the 43rd-minute due to an injury. On 21 December, McCourt came to a mutual agreement with Glenavon to terminate his contract, after struggling to adapt to part-time football.

=== Finn Harps ===
McCourt signed for League of Ireland Premier Division club Finn Harps on 21 February 2017. He debuted three days later as a 69th-minute substitute in a 1–0 defeat at home to Cork City. McCourt scored his first goal for Finn Harps in a 3–2 defeat away to former club Shamrock Rovers on 31 March.

Following a restructure of the League of Ireland divisions, Finn Harps suffered relegation in 2017, despite finishing in the normal play-off places. McCourt committed his future to Harps however, and signed on for the 2018 First Division season.

In June 2018, it was announced that McCourt would retire from playing at the end of the season to take up a role as head of youth structures at Derry City. He pledged to go out on a high and did so by helping Harps to promotion back to the Premier Division for the 2019 season.

== Post-playing career ==
=== Derry City ===
On 6 January 2020, McCourt was appointed as technical director of Derry City. McCourt said of his new role: "I'm privileged to continue my association with this brilliant football club. [I] look forward to working hard in my new role to improve all aspects of Derry City." He remained in this position for four years, departing in January 2024.

=== Glentoran ===
McCourt was appointed assistant manager at Glentoran in June 2024.

== International career ==
McCourt represented Northern Ireland at senior international level. He has also received nine caps for the Northern Ireland under-21s between 2002 and 2005 while playing for Rochdale and played once for the Northern Ireland B team while in the Celtic reserve team.

In April 2002, Northern Ireland manager Sammy McIlroy handed McCourt his senior international debut against Spain in a friendly at Windsor Park, which his team lost 5–0.

He had an almost-seven year wait for his second cap, which came in February 2009 against San Marino in a qualifying match for the 2010 World Cup. Northern Ireland won the game 3–0. Following his breakthrough 2010–11 season at Celtic, McCourt was named in a number of Northern Ireland squads, primarily playing as a substitute.

He scored his first international goals with two solo efforts, as he helped Northern Ireland to a 4–0 victory over the Faroe Islands in a 2012 European Championship qualification match on 10 August 2011. The second goal, which saw him dribble the ball for 40 yards past four players and finish with a close-range chip over the opposition goalkeeper, was described by the Belfast Telegraph as "one of the best ever witnessed" for Northern Ireland.

== Style of play ==
McCourt is known for his technical ability and propensity for scoring "wonder goals". At Derry, he gained the nickname "The Derry Pelé" for his skillful play and is often referred to by his previous clubs' fans as a "cult hero" for his crowd-pleasing displays. Despite lacking stamina and pace, McCourt was known for his close control of the ball and his ability to beat multiple players on mazy runs.

== Personal life ==
McCourt has two older brothers; Harry and Leroy. Harry also played for Derry City and was joint-top scorer in the Irish League during the 1991–92 season while playing for Omagh Town. He also won the 1997–98 Irish League with Cliftonville and now serves as a director at Derry. Leroy has previously worked as a scout for various English and Scottish clubs and is a FIFA registered football agent; his brother Paddy being one of his clients. His nephew Glenn McCourt came through the academy at Derry City before being sold to Norwich City in 2025.

On 12 January 2011, bullets were sent in the post to McCourt (i.e. a death threat) from an address in Northern Ireland. Celtic manager Neil Lennon and teammate Niall McGinn were sent similar packages earlier in the same week.

On 23 February 2022, McCourt appeared in court to face charges of sexual assault against him from an alleged incident on 30 January. McCourt denied all charges and was released on bail. On 31 May 2023, McCourt was found guilty by a Derry court of one count of indecent assault. He was given a three-month sentence, suspended for two years, and was placed on the sex offenders' registry for five years. The charges were quashed in December 2023, following which his solicitor, Ciarán Shiels, described McCourt's conviction as a "grave miscarriage of justice" and said the former footballer had been "very shabbily treated by the PSNI in this city".

== Career statistics ==
=== Club ===
As of match played 6 November 2018

Appearances and goals by club, season and competition
Club	Season	League			National Cup		League Cup		Europe		Other		Total	
Club	Season	Division	Apps	Goals	Apps	Goals	Apps	Goals	Apps	Goals	Apps	Goals	Apps	Goals
Rochdale	2001–02	Third Division	24	4	2	0	0	0	—		2 (Note: Appearance(s) in Football League Trophy)	0	29	4
Rochdale	2002–03	Third Division	26	2	2	1	1	0	—		1	0	30	3
Rochdale	2003–04	Third Division	24	2	2	0	1	0	—		1	0	37	2
Rochdale	2004–05	League Two	6	0	0	0	1	0	—		1	0	8	0
Rochdale	Total		80	8	6	1	3	0	—		5	0	94	9
Shamrock Rovers	2005	League of Ireland Premier Division	17	7	0	0	0	0	—		—		17	7
Derry City	2005	League of Ireland Premier Division	15	1	0	0	2	0	—		—		17	1
Derry City	2006	League of Ireland Premier Division	21	2	3	1	2	0	3 (Note: Appearances in UEFA Cup)	0	—		29	3
Derry City	2007	League of Ireland Premier Division	17	2	3	1	3	1	2 (Note: Appearance(s) in UEFA Champions League)	0	—		25	4
Derry City	2008	League of Ireland Premier Division	7	0	0	0	0	0	—		—		7	0
Derry City	Total		60	5	6	2	7	1	5	0	—		78	8
Celtic	2008–09	Scottish Premier League	4	0	1	0	0	0	0	0	—		5	0
Celtic	2009–10	Scottish Premier League	9	2	1	0	2	1	2 (Note: One appearance in UEFA Champions League, one appearance in UEFA Europa League)	0	—		14	3
Celtic	2010–11	Scottish Premier League	25	7	3	0	2	0	1	0	—		31	7
Celtic	2011–12	Scottish Premier League	13	0	2	0	1	0	2 (Note: Appearances in UEFA Europa League)	0	—		18	0
Celtic	2012–13	Scottish Premier League	15	0	1	0	2	0	2	0	—		20	0
Celtic	Total		66	9	8	0	7	1	7	0	—		88	10
Barnsley	2013–14	Championship	23	2	0	0	0	0	—		—		23	2
Brighton & Hove Albion	2014–15	Championship	10	0	0	0	3	0	—		—		13	0
Notts County (loan)	2014–15	League One	12	1	0	0	0	0	—		0	0	12	1
Luton Town	2015–16	League Two	24	1	1	0	0	0	—		0	0	25	1
Glenavon	2016–17	NIFL Premiership	12	1	0	0	1	0	—		2 (Note: One appearance in NIFL Charity Shield, one appearance and one goal in Mid-Ulster Cup)	1	15	2
Finn Harps	2017	League of Ireland Premier Division	27	2	1	0	0	0	—		—		28	2
Finn Harps	2018	League of Ireland First Division	21	3	0	0	0	0	—		—		21	3
Finn Harps	Total		48	5	1	0	0	0	—		—		49	5
Career total			352	39	22	3	21	2	12	0	7	1	414	45

=== International ===
As of match played 13 November 2015

Appearances and goals by national team and year
National team	Year	Apps	Goals
Northern Ireland	2002	1	0
Northern Ireland	2009	2	0
Northern Ireland	2010	1	0
Northern Ireland	2011	5	2
Northern Ireland	2012	2	0
Northern Ireland	2013	3	0
Northern Ireland	2014	1	0
Northern Ireland	2015	3	0
Total		18	2

=== International goals ===
As of match played 13 November 2015. Northern Ireland score listed first, score column indicates score after each McCourt goal.

International goals by date, venue, cap, opponent, score, result and competition
No.	Date	Venue	Cap	Opponent	Score	Result	Competition	Ref
1	10 August 2011	Windsor Park, Belfast, Northern Ireland	7	Faroe Islands	3–0	4–0	UEFA Euro 2012 qualifying	
2	10 August 2011	Windsor Park, Belfast, Northern Ireland	7	Faroe Islands	4–0	4–0	UEFA Euro 2012 qualifying	

== Honours ==
=== Club ===
Derry City

- FAI Cup (1): 2006
- League of Ireland Cup (3): 2005, 2006, 2007

Celtic

- Scottish Premier League (2): 2011–12, 2012–13
- Scottish League Cup (1): 2009
- Scottish League Cup runner-up (2): 2011, 2012
- Scottish Cup (2): 2011, 2013

Glenavon

- NIFL Charity Shield: 2016–17

=== Individual ===
- PFAI Young Player of the Year (1): 2005
- League of Ireland Premier Division Player of the Month (1): June 2006
