= Dean Delany =

Irish footballer (born 1980)

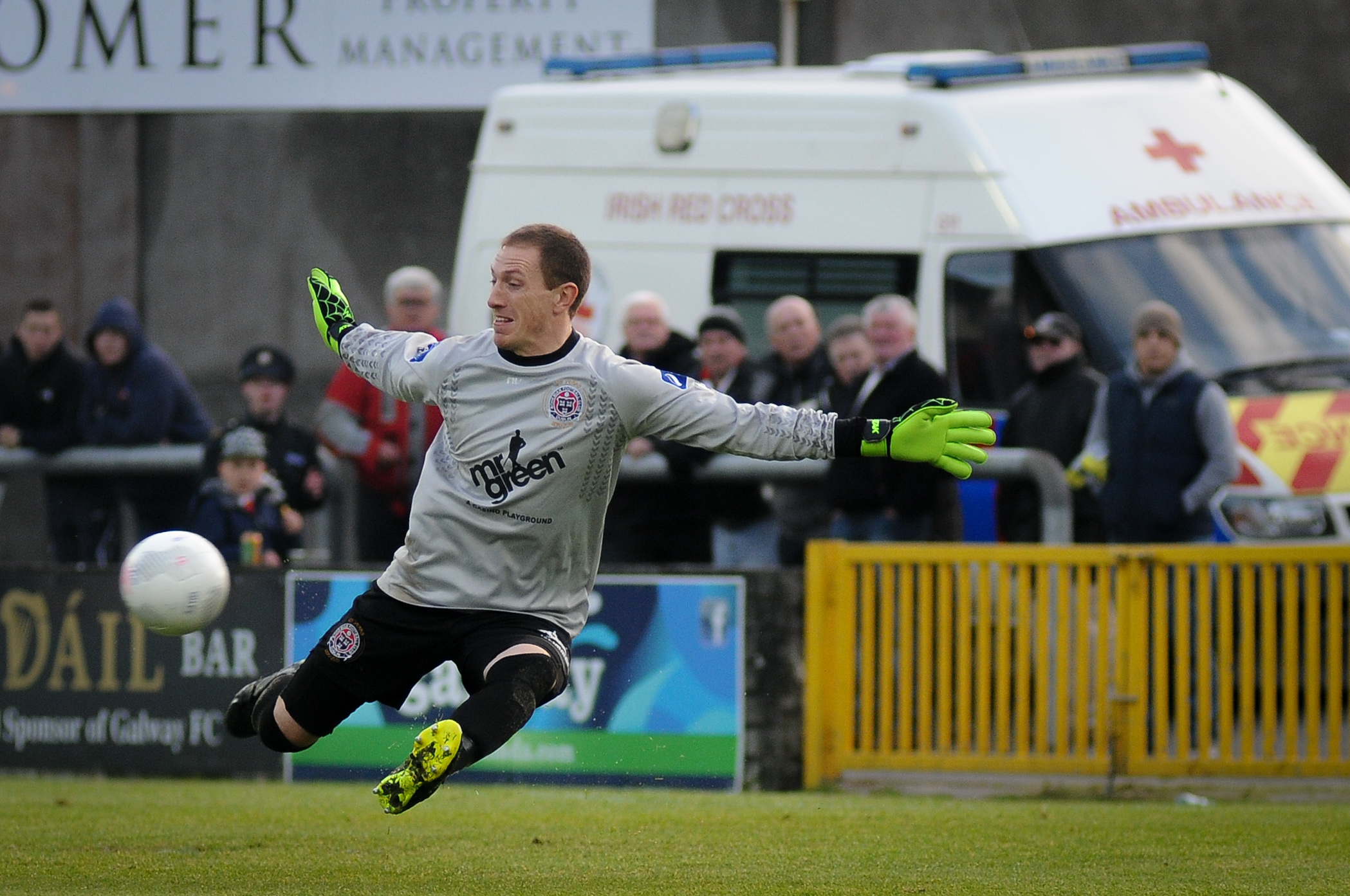
- Delaney playing for Bohemians against Galway United.

Personal information
- Full name: Dean Delany
- Date of birth: 15 September 1980 (age 46)
- Place of birth: Dublin, Ireland
- Height: 1.83 m (6 ft 0 in)
- Position: Goalkeeper

Youth career
- Cherry Orchard
- 1995–1998: Everton

Senior career*
Years	Team	Apps	(Gls)
1998–2000	Everton	0	(0)
2000–2004	Port Vale	37	(0)
2003–2004	→ Macclesfield Town (loan)	0	(0)
2004–2006	Shelbourne	36	(0)
2007	Waterford United	30	(0)
2008–2012	Shelbourne	140	(0)
2013–2016	Bohemians	114	(0)
2017–2019	Shelbourne	61	(0)
Total		408	(0)

International career
- Republic of Ireland U18
1998	Republic of Ireland U19		
1997–2001	Republic of Ireland U21	21	(0)
- * Club domestic league appearances and goals as of 7 October 2019

Dean Delany (born 15 September 1980) is an Irish former footballer who played as a goalkeeper.

Beginning his career in England with Everton in 1997, three years later, he moved on to Port Vale, having never turned out for the first-team at Everton despite winning caps for the Republic of Ireland under-21s and lifting the FA Youth Cup. He spent four years with Vale and did make 39 first-team appearances, though he was never their first-choice keeper. He also spent time on loan at Macclesfield Town but never made it onto the field. He returned to Ireland in 2004 to sign a contract with Shelbourne, who he helped to the League of Ireland title in 2006. He spent 2007 with Waterford United, though he returned to Shelbourne the following year. The "Shels" had been demoted in his absence, and he was the goalkeeper in the 2011 season, as they won promotion back into the top flight. He joined Bohemians in time for the 2013 season before returning to Shelbourne again in 2017 and helping the club to win promotion as League of Ireland First Division champions in 2019. He was named on the PFAI First Division Team of the Year for the 2009 and 2018 seasons.

== Club career ==
=== Everton ===
After securing a contract with English Premier League side Everton as a teenager in 1997, his first year saw him winning the FA Youth Cup. Delany only made one appearance for the "Toffees", and was unable to break into the first-team. In the summer of 2000 he moved to the Second Division side Port Vale.

=== Port Vale ===
During his four seasons with Port Vale, he made 39 appearances in all competitions. He was an unused substitute in the 2001 Football League Trophy final against Brentford at the Millennium Stadium. He also won the Staffordshire Senior Cup in 2001. He also had a two-month stint on loan to Macclesfield Town. Delany failed to gain an appearance with Macclesfield during his time at Moss Rose. He fell to third in the pecking order at Vale Park behind Mark Goodlad and Jonny Brain and was released by manager Martin Foyle in May 2004.

=== Shelbourne ===
Deciding to return home to Ireland's League of Ireland, Delany joined Shelbourne to play first-team football. He joined the club in May 2004 on a short-term contract until the close of the 2004 season, and secured a two-year deal after the club won the league title that year. He eventually made his "Shels" league debut during a 4–2 victory against Waterford United at the RSC on 24 June 2005 and earned himself a first-team place. Delany won his second league winners medal with Shelbourne at the end of the 2006 season. He also represented Shelbourne in their successful years in the Champions League and UEFA Cup. Despite this success, he became a free agent as his contract at Shelbourne was not renewed due to the club's troubled financial situation.

=== Waterford ===
Before the 2007 season, Derry City offered Delany a trial. However, he did not join his former Shelbourne boss Pat Fenlon due to failed negotiations, and joined Waterford United on 15 March 2007 on a free transfer and quickly became the "Blues" first-choice keeper. Despite Delany's heroics throughout the season, Waterford were relegated to the First Division at the end of the season, losing to Finn Harps in a two-legged promotion/relegation play-off. Delany won Waterford's overall Player of the Year award, and helped the "Blues" to win the Munster Senior Cup, but he departed Waterford at the end of the season to rejoin former club Shelbourne.

=== Return to Shelbourne ===
On 7 March 2008, Delany played his first match for Shelbourne since 2006 in a 0–0 draw against Dundalk. He played in all 36 of Shelbourne's league matches in his first season back with the club. He helped the "Reds" concede the fewest goals in the First Division, just 25, securing his position in the Division 1 Team of the Year. Shelbourne were narrowly denied promotion after a goal in the last minute of added time in the final league game against Limerick gave Dundalk the First Division Championship and the accompanying promotion to the Premier Division.

Delany was yet again Shelbourne's first-choice goalkeeper in 2009, playing in all but one league match and winning a place on the PFAI First Division Team of the Year. The "Shels" finished runners-up in the league and qualified for a promotion play-off with Sporting Fingal, which Fingal won 2–1, a slight consolation for him that year was that he was again voted in division 1 Team of the Year. The following season Delany fended off competition from Steve Williams and kept goal as the club won the 2010 Leinster Senior Cup; he kept a clean sheet in the final against Bray Wanderers. He retained his first-team place in 2011 ahead of new signing Paul Skinner, as the "Reds" won promotion as First Division runners-up; the league was extremely tight, as just three points separated the top four teams. He also played in the FAI Cup final at the Aviva Stadium, where his side lost out to Sligo Rovers in the penalty shoot-out following a 1–1 draw.

=== Bohemians ===
On 20 December 2012, Delany was one of 20 players to sign up with Aaron Callaghan's Bohemians for the 2013 campaign. Dean was ever-present during "Bohs" league campaign, featuring in all 33 games. He signed a new one-year contract at the close of that season to keep him at the club until the end of 2014. Bohemian finished fifth in 2015, improving two places from the 2014 campaign. They finished eighth in the 2016 campaign.

=== Third spell at Shelbourne ===
Delany joined Shelbourne for a third spell for the 2017 season. He made 27 appearances as Owen Heary's Shelbourne posted a fourth-place finish and won his third Leinster Senior Cup as Shelbourne beat Dundalk 4–2 after extra time at Oriel Park. He was named on the PFAI First Division Team of the Year for the 2018 season, having made 28 league appearances throughout the year. Shelbourne qualified for the play-offs, losing out Drogheda United on penalties at the semi-final stage. He left Shelbourne after their First Division title-winning 2019 season.

== International career ==
Delany was capped at U15, 16, 18, 19, 20, 21 and B international level, and represented the Irish under-21s as a 17-year-old in a triangular Celtic tournament involving Scotland and Northern Ireland. He looked to be Ireland's most promising young goalkeeper after the 1999 World Youth Championship, in which he was part of the "Golden generation" of Irish youth football (which included talent such as Damien Duff, Richard Dunne and Robbie Keane), a side that eventually made it to the quarter-finals of the competition. He was also part of the Irish UEFA Under-18 Championship winning squad of 1998, the following year he was eligible again and played a big part in securing a bronze medal in the third-place play-off in Sweden. He made 28 appearances for the Republic of Ireland youth teams, including an impressive 21 appearances for the Irish under 21s under bosses Ian Evans and Don Givens.

He later was noticed after making a start to the 2003–04 season with Port Vale by the then Republic of Ireland manager Brian Kerr who called him into the senior international squad for a training camp before the crucial European championship qualifier against Georgia.

== Personal life ==
Delany is married with three children. He holds a keen interest in music and was the rhythm guitarist and vocalist of the Irish indie band The Novas. Delany has worked as a postal worker with An Post since returning to semi-professional football in Ireland.

== Career statistics ==
Appearances and goals by club, season and competition
Club	Season	League			National cup (Note: Includes FA Cup, Irish Cup)		League cup (Note: Includes Football League Cup, Northern Ireland Football League Cup)		Other		Total	
Club	Season	Division	Apps	Goals	Apps	Goals	Apps	Goals	Apps	Goals	Apps	Goals
Port Vale	2000–01	FL Second Division	9	0	0	0	0	0	1	0	10	0
Port Vale	2001–02	FL Second Division	4	0	0	0	0	0	0	0	4	0
Port Vale	2002–03	FL Second Division	10	0	0	0	0	0	0	0	10	0
Port Vale	2003–04	FL Second Division	14	0	0	0	1	0	0	0	15	0
Port Vale	Total		37	0	0	0	1	0	1	0	39	0
Macclesfield Town (loan)	2003–04	FL Third Division	0	0	0	0	0	0	0	0	0	0
Shelbourne	2004	LOI Premier Division	0	0	0	0	0	0	0	0	0	0
Shelbourne	2005	LOI Premier Division	20	0	0	0	2	0	4	0	26	0
Shelbourne	2006	LOI Premier Division	16	0	2	0	6	0	5	0	29	0
Shelbourne	Total		36	0	2	0	8	0	9	0	55	0
Waterford United	2007	LOI Premier Division	30	0	4	0	1	0	0	0	35	0
Shelbourne	2008	LOI First Division	36	0	1	0	2	0	0	0	39	0
Shelbourne	2009	LOI First Division	32	0	2	0	0	0	1	0	35	0
Shelbourne	2010	LOI First Division	33	0	2	0	0	0	4	0	39	0
Shelbourne	2011	LOI First Division	28	0	5	0	0	0	0	0	33	0
Shelbourne	2012	LOI Premier Division	11	0	3	0	2	0	2	0	18	0
Shelbourne	Total		140	0	13	0	4	0	7	0	164	0
Bohemians	2013	LOI Premier Division	33	0	0	0	2	0	0	0	35	0
Bohemians	2014	LOI Premier Division	26	0	1	0	3	0	0	0	30	0
Bohemians	2015	LOI Premier Division	32	0	0	0	3	0	0	0	35	0
Bohemians	2016	LOI Premier Division	23	0	0	0	2	0	0	0	25	0
Bohemians	Total		114	0	1	0	10	0	0	0	125	0
Shelbourne	2017	LOI First Division	27	0	0	0	0	0	0	0	27	0
Shelbourne	2018	LOI First Division	27	0	0	0	0	0	0	0	27	0
Shelbourne	2019	LOI First Division	7	0	0	0	0	0	0	0	7	0
Shelbourne	Total		61	0	0	0	0	0	0	0	61	0
Career total			418	0	20	0	24	0	17	0	479	0

== Honours ==
Everton

- FA Youth Cup: 1998

Port Vale

- Football League Trophy: 2000–01

Shelbourne

- League of Ireland: 2004, 2006
- Leinster Senior Cup: 2010, 2017
- League of Ireland First Division promotion: 2011
- League of Ireland First Division: 2019

Waterford United

- Munster Senior Cup: 2007

Bohemians

- Leinster Senior Cup: 2016

Republic of Ireland

- UEFA European Under-19 Championship: 1998

Individual

- PFAI First Division Team of the Year: 2009, 2018
