= Bobby Ryan (footballer) =

Irish footballer

Personal information
- Date of birth: 1 May 1979 (age 47)
- Place of birth: Limerick, Ireland
- Position: Winger

Senior career*
Years	Team	Apps	(Gls)
- Limerick
- Galway United
2002–2004	Bohemians		
2005–2006	Shelbourne	44	(2)
2007–2008	Dunfermline Athletic	9	(0)
2008–2009	St Patrick's Athletic	21	(1)
2010	Galway United	19	(0)
2010	Limerick	11	(1)
2011	Galway United	35	(2)
2012	Monaghan United	x	(x)
- * Club domestic league appearances and goals

Bobby Ryan (born 1 May 1979) is an Irish former footballer.

== Career ==
Ryan had a schoolboy career with the Geraldines nursery club in Limerick and had progressed to play for Limerick and Galway United, before Stephen Kenny signed him for Bohemians in January 2002.

He made his debut for the club away to Cork City on 20 January. The 2002–03 season saw Ryan in tremendous form and he capped it off by scoring the goal that won the 2002–03 league title for Bohemians in the dying minutes of a 1–0 win over Shelbourne at Tolka Park on 12 January 2003. He never regained the form of that season while at Bohs and at the end of the 2004 season, along with teammates Glen Crowe and Colin Hawkins, moved to rivals Shelbourne in a controversial move.

Ryan then won the League of Ireland championship with Shelbourne in 2006, but the squad broke up due to financial problems.

Ryan then joined Scottish First Division club Dunfermline Athletic in January 2007. He made nine appearances in the 2007–08 season before returning to Ireland in January 2008.

In January 2008, having failed to make much impact at Dunfermline, Ryan moved back to Ireland to play for St Patrick's Athletic as new Dunfermline manager Jim McIntyre began reshaping the club's squad.

In February 2010, Ryan signed for Galway United after spending most of pre-season there. However, due to Galway's desire to ease financial problems by releasing players, Ryan was able to sign for his hometown club of Limerick in the mid-season transfer window.

He returned to Galway United in 2011 starting his third spell with the club.

He joined Monaghan United for the 2012 season. On 18 June 2012, the club announced their withdrawal from the League of Ireland and all of their playing staff were released by the club. Bobby is currently coaching with St. Mochta's F.C. in Clonsilla, Dublin 15

== Honours ==
Bohemians

- League of Ireland Premier Division (1): 2002–03

Shelbourne

- League of Ireland Premier Division (1): 2006
