= Colin Hawkins =

Irish footballer and manager

Personal information
- Full name: Colin Joseph Hawkins
- Date of birth: 17 August 1977 (age 49)
- Place of birth: Galway, Ireland
- Height: 6 ft 1 in (1.85 m)
- Position: Centre back

Youth career
- Salthill Devon

Senior career*
Years	Team	Apps	(Gls)
1995–1997	Coventry City	0	(0)
1997–2000	St Patrick's Athletic	89	(17)
2000–2001	Doncaster Rovers	38	(4)
2001–2004	Bohemians	88	(5)
2004–2007	Shelbourne	52	(3)
2007–2008	Coventry City	13	(0)
2008	→ Chesterfield (loan)	5	(0)
2008–2010	Brighton & Hove Albion	18	(0)
2010	Sporting Fingal	9	(2)
2011	Dundalk	25	(4)
2012	Shamrock Rovers	21	(1)
Total		358	(36)

International career
1998–1999	Republic of Ireland U21	8	(0)

Managerial career
- 2013: Shamrock Rovers (assistant)
- 2014: Shamrock Rovers B
- * Club domestic league appearances and goals

Colin Joseph Hawkins (born 17 August 1977) is an Irish retired footballer and was previously manager of Shamrock Rovers B. Hawkins was a central defender with Shamrock Rovers along with a number of other clubs in the League of Ireland and cross-channel in England. He has represented the Republic of Ireland at youth and U21 levels.

== Playing career ==
=== Coventry City ===
Hawkins made his first League of Ireland appearance as a schoolboy for Salthill Devon on 14 August 1994. He produced an impressive display despite his side losing 4–0 to Athlone Town in the League of Ireland Cup. After finishing his secondary education Hawkins was offered a 2-year contract with then English Premiership side Coventry City after impressing in trials. Hawkins played for the Republic of Ireland national under-19 football team in the 1996 UEFA European Under-18 Championship finals in Luxembourg. After the 1996/97 season the Coventry management deemed Hawkins to be surplus to requirements and released him, having never played a senior game. That summer he played a starring role in the Brian Kerr managed Republic of Ireland under-20 side in the 1997 FIFA World Youth Championships, helping Ireland to 3rd place.

=== St Patrick's Athletic ===
Despite interest from several British sides Hawkins signed for Irish top flight club St Patrick's Athletic, where he linked up with fellow Bronze medallists from the FIFA World Youth Championships, Trevor Molloy and Thomas Morgan. Hawkins immediately earned a starting spot alongside Packie Lynch and their solid base helped St Pats win the championship in his first season. Hawkins played in the Champions League preliminary round against Celtic in 1998, in a 0–0 draw at Celtic Park. He was rewarded with the Players' Young Player of the Year Award. In November 1998 he was awarded the FAI national League player of the year award. St Pats also won the league in Hawkins second season. During these years he would represent Ireland many times at Under 21 level. Hawkins was injured at the start of the 1999/2000 season and on his return was played in a deep midfield role. He was not comfortable there and his performance levels dropped remarkably. Towards the end of the season it was announced that he would not stay with St Pats, but join English Football Conference side Doncaster Rovers.

=== Doncaster Rovers ===
Hawkins was signed by Ian Snodin, but within weeks Snodin was sacked and replaced by Steve Wignall. Wignall did not rate Hawkins as highly as Snodin did, and initially Hawkins had to be content with only substitute appearances. He broke into the starting line up in November 2000 and remained there for the rest of the 2000/01 season. Hawkins had firmly established himself in the side during the first half of the 2001/02 season but was forced to leave the club, after Doncaster were forced to cut their playing squad down due to financial restrictions.

=== Bohemians ===
November 2001 saw Hawkins return to Ireland to play for Bohemians and he made his debut for the "Gypsies" against former club St. Pats on 30 November. In 2003 Hawkins won his third league winners medal as Bohemians won their second title in 3 years, though Hawkins was never a popular player in Dalymount Park due to consistent poor performances.

=== Shelbourne ===
At the end of the 2004 season, Bohemians Dublin rivals Shelbourne signed 3 out-of-contract players from Bohemians; Hawkins, Glen Crowe, and Bobby Ryan. Hawkins won his fourth league title, and his first piece of silverware at Shelbourne, as they won their third title in 4 years in November 2006 defeating Bohemians 2–1 to clinch the top spot.

=== Coventry City ===
In January 2007 Hawkins made a free transfer back to Championship side Coventry City, the team where he signed his first professional contract. This time however Hawkins went on to make several very impressive appearances in his first season back, helping Coventry City stay clear of relegation. A troublesome Achilles injury restricted Hawkins to just a solitary start in his second season (against Notts County in the League Cup) and with the arrival of new manager Chris Coleman he was deemed surplus to requirements and his contract was not renewed.

=== Brighton & Hove Albion ===
On 28 May 2008, it was revealed that Hawkins had become first signing by manager Micky Adams in his second spell as manager at League One Brighton, agreeing a two-year contract. Hawkins and Adams had previously worked together at Coventry. Following the completion of his two-year contract, Hawkins was released by Brighton.

=== Sporting Fingal ===
Hawkins returned to Ireland in June 2010 when he signed for Sporting Fingal as he wanted to return home for family reasons. He was part of the team that bowed out the UEFA Europa league after losing 6–4 on aggregate to Marítimo. Hawkins found himself without a club three weeks before the start of the 2011 season after Sporting Fingal cancelled all their players contracts and later folded.

=== Dundalk ===
Two days after Sporting Fingal folded Hawkins followed his former teammate Greg Bolger and signed a one-year deal with Dundalk.

=== Shamrock Rovers ===
On 13 January 2012 Hawkins signed for the League of Ireland Champions, and his fifth Dublin club, as a player-coach

== Honours ==
=== Team ===
St Patrick's Athletic

- League of Ireland (2): 1997–98, 1998–99

Bohemians

- League of Ireland (1): 2002–03

Shelbourne

- League of Ireland (1): 2006

Republic of Ireland

- FIFA World Youth Championship Third Place: 1997

=== Individual ===
- PFAI Young Player of the Year (1): 1997–98
- League of Ireland Player of the Year (1): 1997–98
