= Richie Baker (Irish footballer) =

Irish footballer

Personal information
- Date of birth: 17 April 1980 (age 46)
- Place of birth: Dublin, Ireland
- Position: Midfielder

Youth career
- Stella Maris

Senior career*
Years	Team	Apps	(Gls)
1998–2003	Shelbourne		
2004	New England Revolution	20	(0)
2005–2006	Shelbourne	41	(7)
2007–2008	Drogheda United	28	(4)
2009	Shelbourne	23	(4)
2010	Bray Wanderers	8	(0)
2017 – Date.	Rosemount Mulvey F.C	3	

International career
- Republic of Ireland U18
1999	Republic of Ireland U20	2	(0)
2000	Republic of Ireland U21	1	(0)
- * Club domestic league appearances and goals

Richie Baker (born 17 April 1980) is an Irish former footballer. Besides the Republic of Ireland, he has played in the United States.

== Career ==
Richie, who served his footballing apprenticeship with Stella Maris, is the brother of Dessie Baker, alongside whom he made numerous appearances for Shelbourne in the late 1990s and early 2000s (decade). Richie made his League of Ireland and Shelbourne debut at the age of 18 against Shamrock Rovers in August 1998. During this period, Baker was an important part of the Irish national team youth teams, playing for the U-18's, U-20's, and U-21's.

He represented his country at the UEFA U-19 Championship in Sweden in 1999 where he won a bronze medal.

Baker is the only player to have won 2 PFAI Young Player of the Year awards.

The highlight of Baker's career was arguably his 83rd minute free-kick which earned Shelbourne a 1–0 victory away to Sloga Jugomagnat of the Republic of Macedonia in a Champions League qualifying match on 12 July 2000 []. This represented the first away victory achieved by an Irish side in European competition for almost two decades. Shels won the tie 2–1 but were eliminated by Norwegian champions Rosenborg in the second qualifying round.

Richie won both the League of Ireland championship and the FAI Cup with Shels in 1999/2000 and three further league titles with them in 2001/02, 2003, and 2006. He spent the 2004 season with the New England Revolution of Major League Soccer before returning to Shels for the beginning of the 2005 season. He was sent off in the last game of the 2006 season versus Bohemians but Shels still went on to win the game and clinch the title.

Following Shelbourne's financial meltdown at the end of 2006, Baker signed for Drogheda United for the 2007 season. Baker picked up his fifth league title when United were crowned League of Ireland Premier Division champions at the end of the 2007 season. Baker spent two seasons at Drogheda United before financial problems at the County Louth club curtailed his spell. Despite training with Bohemians and Glentoran during 2009 pre-season Baker failed to find a new club to continue professional football. On 9 February 2009 Baker made a return to Shelbourne, now playing in the First Division, for a third spell where he was re-united with his former Shels boss Dermot Keely. He struggled for fitness on his return to Shelbourne but still made 25 league and cup appearances for Shelbourne in 2009, scoring 5 goals.

Baker was not offered a new contract by Shelbourne at the end of the 2009 season and on 4 March 2010 he signed for Bray Wanderers.
