= Alan Cawley =

Irish footballer

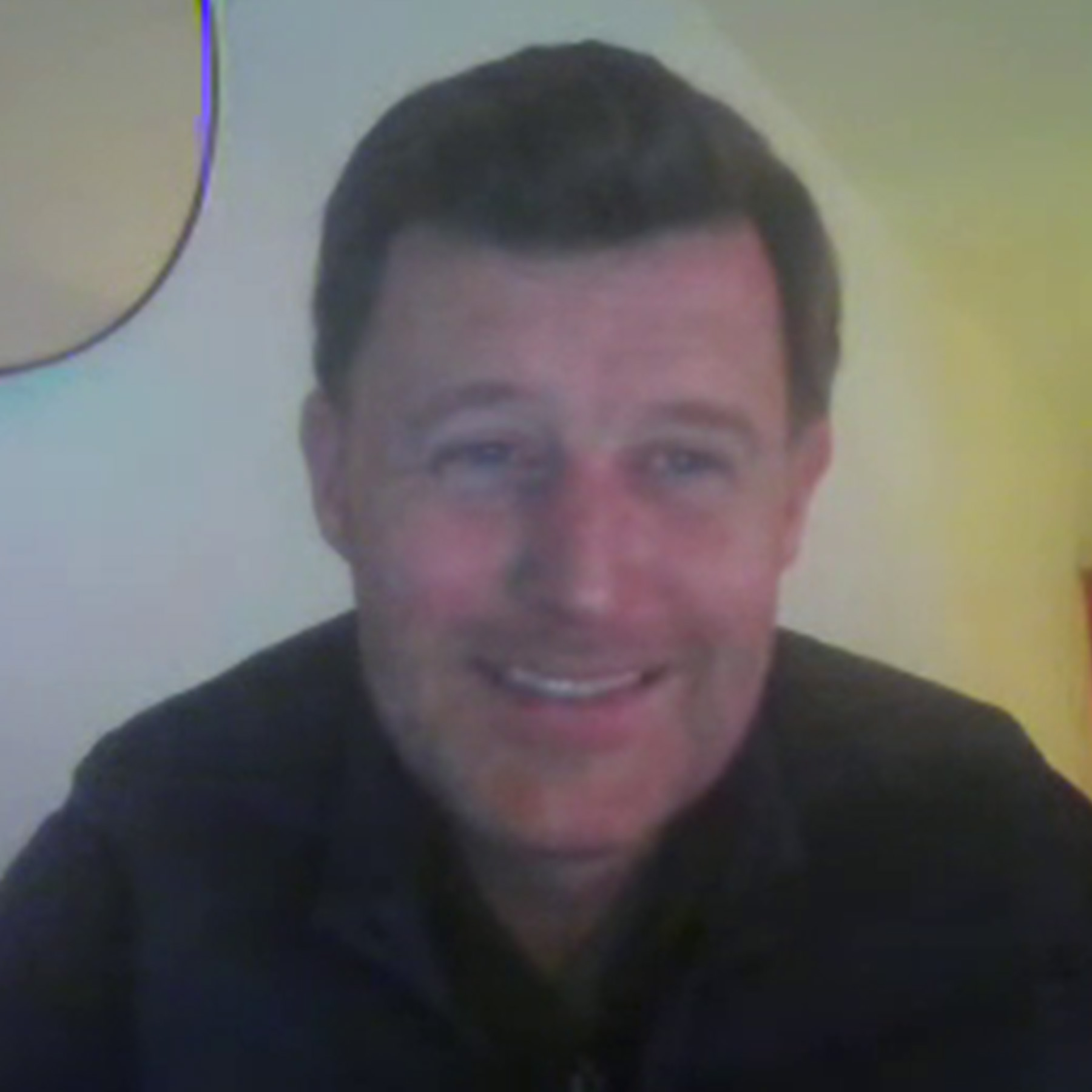
- Cawley in 2024

Personal information
- Date of birth: 3 January 1982 (age 44)
- Place of birth: Sligo, Ireland
- Position: Midfielder

Youth career
- Belvedere

Senior career*
Years	Team	Apps	(Gls)
1998–2000	Leeds United	0	(0)
2000–2002	Sheffield Wednesday	0	(0)
2002–2003	UCD	45	(3)
2004–2005	Shelbourne	24	(0)
2005	→ Longford Town (loan)	9	(1)
2006	UCD	15	(1)
2006	Waterford United	9	(2)
2007–2008	Bray Wanderers	57	(11)
2009	St Patrick's Athletic	25	(2)
2010	Dundalk	10	(0)
2011	Portadown	7	(1)

International career
1999	Republic of Ireland U17	2	(0)
- * Club domestic league appearances and goals

Alan Cawley (born 3 January 1982) is a retired Irish footballer.

== Career ==
Before signing for Leeds United Cawley attended Summerhill College in Sligo. He began his career at Leeds United and had a spell at Sheffield Wednesday before returning to Ireland to sign for UCD. His impressive performances for the students earned him a move to Shelbourne where he won a league winners medal. He had loan spells at Longford Town and Waterford United before returning for a second spell at Belfield. Cawley made his debut for St Patrick's Athletic on 18 February 2009 vs a Chelsea XI, when he scored his first goal for the club, a wonderful free kick into the top left corner.

Cawley signed for Dundalk on 24 December 2009, making him newly appointed manager Ian Foster's first signing at the club. Foster commented "I am pleased to be able to complete the first of my new signings for next season, and Alan is a player who has impressed me over the last couple of seasons. He is a natural footballer who revels in playing the ball on the ground and is a natural fit for the attacking style that I want to employ." After being plagued with injury throughout the 2010 season Cawley made only ten appearances. On 6 February Cawley signed for Portadown.

Cawley is Sligo native and has represented Ireland at all levels up to Under 18. He is a regular pundit on Soccer Republic on RTÉ television and on Game On, RTÉ 2FM radio's daily sports show from 6p.m.-7p.m. Monday to Friday.

== Honours ==
Shelbourne

- League of Ireland (1): 2004
