= Joseph N'Do =

Cameroonian footballer (born 1975)

Joseph Ndo
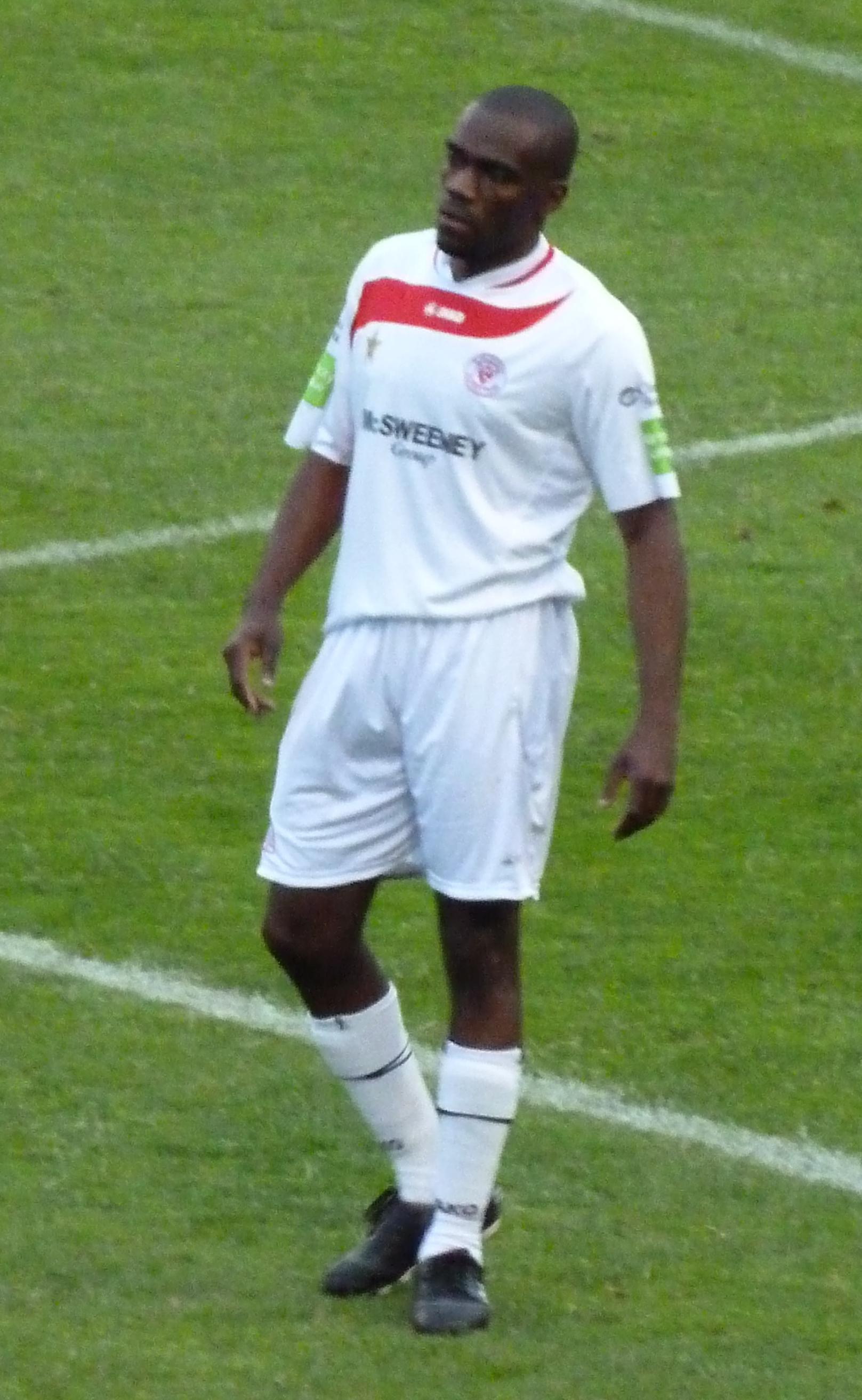
- Ndo playing for Sligo Rovers in 2011

Personal information
- Full name: Joseph Cyrille Ndo
- Date of birth: 28 April 1976 (age 50)
- Place of birth: Yaoundé, Cameroon
- Height: 1.80 m (5 ft 11 in)
- Positions: Attacking midfielder; forward

Senior career*
Years	Team	Apps	(Gls)
1995–1996	Canon Yaoundé	51	(4)
1997–1998	Cotonsport Garoua	28	(3)
1998–1999	Neuchâtel Xamax	28	(4)
1999–2001	Strasbourg	25	(5)
2001	Al-Khaleej	19	(4)
2003	Chengdu Wuniu	25	(8)
2003–2004	St Patrick's Athletic	17	(3)
2004–2006	Shelbourne	47	(13)
2007–2008	St Patrick's Athletic	16	(1)
2008	→ Shamrock Rovers (loan)	9	(1)
2009	Bohemians	31	(3)
2010–2014	Sligo Rovers	109	(8)
2014	→ Limerick (loan)	3	(0)
2015	Arrow Harps	3	(2)
2016–2017	Achill Rovers	1	(0)
2016	→ Mayo League		

International career
1998–2002	Cameroon	21	(2)
2010	League of Ireland XI		

Managerial career
- 2015: Sligo Rovers (caretaker)
- 2015: Achill Rovers
- 2015: Mayo League
- 2021–2022: IT Sligo
Medal record
Representing Cameroon
Africa Cup of Nations
Winner	2000 Ghana-Nigeria
Winner	2002 Mali
- * Club domestic league appearances and goals

Joseph Cyrille Ndo (born 28 April 1976) is a Cameroonian football coach and commentator. A former professional footballer, he played as an attacking midfielder or forward. He made 21 appearances for the Cameroon national team, scoring twice. He is regarded as one of the greatest players to have played in the League of Ireland.

== Club career ==
=== Cameroon ===
An attacking central midfielder, Ndo began his career in 1995 with Canon Yaoundé before moving to Coton Sport FC de Garoua in 1997. He won the 1998 Elite One league title with Coton Sport before leaving Africa for European football.

=== Switzerland and France ===
N'Do's first European club was Swiss side Neuchâtel Xamax. He spent the 1998–99 season with Xamax, with the club finishing sixth.

He then joined Racing Club Strasbourg and spent the 1999–2000 and 2000–01 seasons with the club. The club won the 2000–01 Coupe de France but were also relegated to Ligue 2 that same season. N'Do then moved to Saudi Arabia.

=== Asia ===
After a season with Saudi Arabian club Al-Khaleej, N'Do moved to Chinese club Chengdu Blades, finishing sixth in his only season.

=== Ireland ===
N'Do's first Irish club was St Patrick's Athletic whom he joined in 2003. After the 2003 League of Ireland, he then signed for Dublin rivals Shelbourne in 2004 and made his debut in August against Cork City. N'Do scored the only goal for the Reds in their home leg against Odense Boldklub in the second round of the 2006 UEFA Intertoto Cup on 9 July 2006, only for the team go out of the competition 3–1 on aggregate.

N'Do picked up a league winner's medal in the 2006 season after helping Shelbourne to their third league title in four years. In November 2006, he was voted PFAI Player of the Year by his fellow professionals for his contribution to Shels' league-winning campaign. and as a result was included in the team of the year.

After completing his contracted period with Shelbourne, N'Do rejoined St Patrick's Athletic, when he signed for John McDonnell's team in December 2006.

He signed for Shamrock Rovers on loan in July 2008, scoring one goal for the Hoops in a man of the match performance on 29 August.

N'Do signed for Bohemians just before the beginning of the 2009 season and marked his debut for the club with a goal in a 1–0 victory over Dundalk at Oriel Park. He was named Player of the Month for March 2009 for his performances. On 15 July 2009, he scored a crucial goal in the 2010 UEFA Champions League qualifier against Red Bull Salzburg in Austria to secure a 1–1 draw for Bohemians. However N'Do and Bohs would depart that competition over the two legs, losing 2–1 on aggregate. He then added to his collection of medals on 26 September as Bohs beat Waterford United in the final of the 2009 League of Ireland Cup#Final. He was not done yet, as a great run of form towards the end of the season helped Bohs to their second League of Ireland Premier Division title in a row, winning by four points over closest rivals Shamrock Rovers with N'Do scoring vital goals against Drogheda United and Sligo Rovers in the closing games of the season. His performances over the season were rewarded when he was once more voted on to the PFAI Team of the Year for 2009 along with teammates Brian Murphy, Conor Powell, Ken Oman, Brian Shelley and Gary Deegan. On 6 November 2009, N'Do played his last match for Bohemians against Bray Wanderers to clinch the title for the Gypsies after they won the league. Like his former manager Pat Fenlon, he is one of a rare group of players to have played for each of Dublin's "Big 4" – St. Patrick's Athletic, Shelbourne, Shamrock Rovers, and Bohemians.

On 23 March 2010, N'Do signed for Sligo Rovers until the end of the season, having been a free agent after leaving Bohemians at the end of the previous season. He was voted man of the match at the 2010 FAI Cup Final, won by Sligo Rovers at the Aviva Stadium in Dublin on 14 November 2010. Under the guidance of new manager Paul Cooke, he continued to haunt former club St Pat's, with several man of the match performances during the 2011 season. He remained with Sligo for the 2012 season, and won the League of Ireland for his fourth time. In 2013, he won another FAI Cup medal with Sligo Rovers, helping them beat Drogheda United 3–2 with a controversial assist to Sligo playmaker Danny North.

On 30 July 2014, N'Do signed for Limerick on loan as a player-coach until the end of the season and on 31 January 2015, he signed for Irish amateur club Arrow Harps as a player-coach. He played three games before he rejoined Sligo Rovers.

On 27 March 2016, N'Do made his first appearance for his latest club Achill Rovers.

== International career ==
Ndo played for the Cameroon national team after being discovered by Claude LeRoy just prior to the 1998 FIFA World Cup, and took part in three matches during that tournament. In the qualifying campaign for the 2002 FIFA World Cup, he played three times but remained an unused substitute in the finals. He did not play for Cameroon after 2002, and publicly expressed his unwillingness to come back. Ndo earned 21 caps while representing his country at senior level.

== Post-playing career ==
In February 2015, Ndo joined Achill Rovers in a coaching capacity to work with their Under-12 and -13 boys teams, Under-12 and -14 girls teams and their junior side. and on 9 April 2015, fan favourite Ndo was re-signed as a coach with Sligo Rovers following the sacking of manager Owen Heary, where he was appointed caretaker manager of the club alongside Gavin Dykes.

In September 2015, he became head coach of the Mayo League representative team.

In September 2021, Ndo was appointed coach of IT Sligo's football team.

He has worked as a football commentator.

== Career statistics ==
=== Club ===
Appearances and goals by club, season and competition
Club	Season	League			National cup (Note: Includes FAI Cup)		League cup (Note: Includes League of Ireland Cup)		Europe		Other		Total	
Club	Season	Division	Apps	Goals	Apps	Goals	Apps	Goals	Apps	Goals	Apps	Goals	Apps	Goals
Sligo Rovers	2010	League of Ireland	29	3	4	0	3	1	0	0	0	0	36	4
Sligo Rovers	2011	League of Ireland	29	2	4	0	3	1	2	0	3 (Note: Appearances in Setanta Cup)	1	41	4
Sligo Rovers	Total		58	5	8	0	6	2	2	0	3	1	77	8

== Honours ==
=== Player ===
Cotonsport Garoua

- Elite One: 1998

Strasbourg

- Coupe de France: 2000–01

Shelbourne

- League of Ireland: 2004, 2006

Bohemians

- League of Ireland: 2009
- League of Ireland Cup: 2009

Sligo Rovers

- League of Ireland: 2012
- FAI Cup: 2010, 2011, 2013
- League of Ireland Cup: 2010
- Setanta Sports Cup: 2014

Cameroon

- African Cup of Nations: 2000, 2002

=== Individual ===
- PFAI Players' Player of the Year: 2006
