= 2006 League of Ireland Cup =

Tournament details
- Country: Ireland

The League of Ireland Cup 2006 was the 33rd staging of the League of Ireland Cup.

The 2006 League Cup kicked off in April. Sixteen league clubs and the Kerry League entered the competition. There were two clubs drawn to face each other in the first round, with the rest given byes to the second round.

== First round ==
Match played on 3 April 2006.

Tie no	Home team	Score	Away team
1	Finn Harps	1–1	Galway United
Finn Harps won 2–1 on penalties

== Second round ==
Matches played between 2 May and 10 May 2006.

Tie no	Home team	Score	Away team
1	St Patrick's Athletic	0–2	Shamrock Rovers
2	Dublin City	0–1	Shelbourne
3	Dundalk	0–1	Drogheda United
4	Derry City	1–0	Longford Town
5	Monaghan United	0–2	Bohemians
6	Sligo Rovers	1–1	Finn Harps
Finn Harps won 5–4 on penalties
7	Cork City	0–1	Cobh Ramblers
8	Limerick	1–0	Kerry League

== Quarter-finals ==
Matches played on 4 July and 5 July 2006.

Tie no	Home team	Score	Away team
1	Bohemians	1–0	Cobh Ramblers
2	Derry City	4–0	Drogheda United
3	Limerick	1–0	Shamrock Rovers
4	Shelbourne	4–1	Finn Harps

== Semi-finals ==
2006-08-07

Shelbourne	1–0	Bohemians
Ndo 76'

Tolka Park, Dublin

2006-09-06

Limerick	0–3	Derry City
		McGlynn 56', 69'; O'Flynn 60'

Hogan Park, Limerick

== Final ==
2006-09-28

Derry City	0–0 (a.e.t) Derry City won 3–0 on penalties	Shelbourne

The Brandywell, Derry City

League of Ireland Cup Winner 2006

Derry City
7th Title
