= 2006 League of Ireland Premier Division =

League of Ireland Premier Division
- Season: 2006
- Champions: Shelbourne (13th title)
- Relegated: Shelbourne; Dublin City
- UEFA Champions League: Derry City
- UEFA Cup: St Patrick's Athletic; Drogheda United
- UEFA Intertoto Cup: Cork City
- Setanta Sports Cup: Cork City; Derry City; Drogheda United; St Patrick's Athletic
- Top goalscorer: Jason Byrne: 15 (Shelbourne)
- Highest attendance: 6,080 Derry City 1–0 Cork City
- Total attendance: 257,745 (Note: Figures do not include results from matches played against Dublin City F.C. who withdrew midway through the season https://www.researchgate.net/figure/League-of-Ireland-Premier-Division-Attendance_tbl1_286919999)
- Average attendance: 1,562

The 2006 League of Ireland Premier Division was the 22nd season of the League of Ireland Premier Division. The division was made up of 12 teams. Shelbourne were champions while Derry City finished as runners-up. However Shelbourne were subsequently demoted to the First Division and had to withdraw from the 2007–08 UEFA Champions League and 2007 Setanta Sports Cup because of their financial difficulties.

== Club information ==
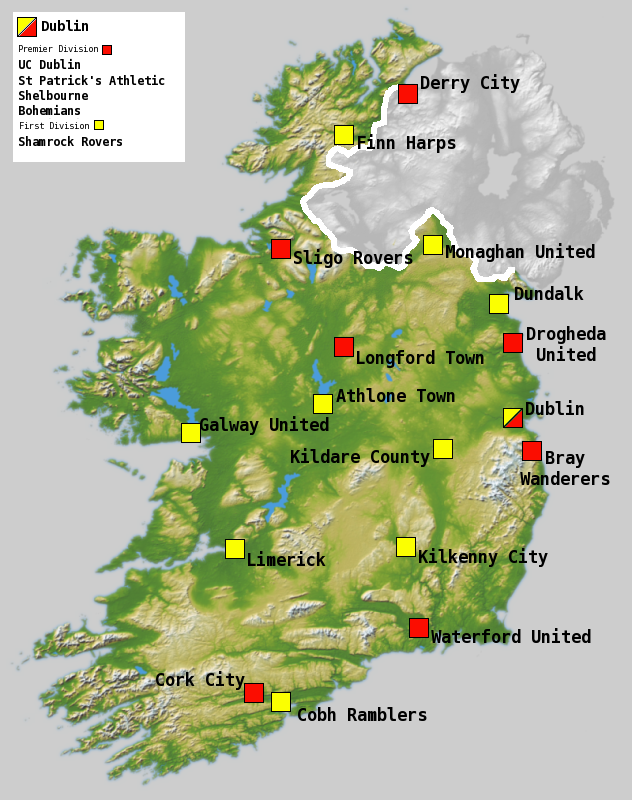
The clubs that competed in the 2006 League of Ireland.

Team	Manager	Main sponsor	Kit supplier	Stadium	Capacity
Bohemians	(Republic of Ireland) Gareth Farrelly	Des Kelly Carpets	O'Neills	Dalymount Park	8,500
Bray Wanderers	(Republic of Ireland) Eddie Gormley	Slevin Group	Adidas	Carlisle Grounds	7,000
Cork City	(Republic of Ireland) Damien Richardson	Nissan	O'Neills	Turners Cross	8,000
Derry City	(Republic of Ireland) Stephen Kenny	MeteorElectrical.com	Umbro	The Brandywell	7,700
Drogheda United	(Republic of Ireland) Paul Doolin	Murphy Environmental	Jako	United Park	5,400
Dublin City	(Republic of Ireland) Dermot Keely	Carroll's Irish Gift Stores	Umbro	Dalymount Park	8,500
Longford Town	(Republic of Ireland) Alan Mathews	Flancare	Umbro	Flancare Park	4,500
Shelbourne	(Republic of Ireland) Pat Fenlon	JW Hire	Umbro	Tolka Park	10,100
Sligo Rovers	(Northern Ireland) Sean Connor	Toher's	Jako	The Showgrounds	5,500
St Patrick's Athletic	(Republic of Ireland) John McDonnell	Smart Telecom	Umbro	Richmond Park	5,500
UCD	(Republic of Ireland) Pete Mahon	Budweiser	O'Neills	Belfield Park	1,900
Waterford United	(Republic of Ireland) Gareth Cronin	ThermoFrame	Diadora	Waterford Regional Sports Centre	8,000

== Overview ==
The Premier Division season kicked off on 10 March and concluded on 17 November. The season saw several clubs face financial difficulties. The Revenue Commissioners took High Court action and threatened to have Shelbourne wound up after it failed to pay more than €104,000 in outstanding taxes. Shelbourne also struggled to pay its players during the season. In July Dublin City also went out of business and withdrew from the league, unable to complete the season. Their results were expunged from the record which benefited both Cork and Derry who had dropped points to them. However Shelbourne's off field problems did not prevent them from winning the title. Mark Farren's stoppage-time winner for Derry City away to Waterford United on 13 November ensured that for the third successive year the title would be decided on the final day of the season. Shelbourne clinched the title with a 2–1 win over Bohemians at Tolka Park. Jason Byrne and Glen Crowe scored the vital goals. However Shelbourne's celebrations were cut short when the league decided to demote them to the First Division. They also withdrew from the 2007–08 UEFA Champions League and 2007 Setanta Sports Cup because of their financial difficulties.

== Final table ==
Pos	Team	Pld	W	D	L	GF	GA	GD	Pts	Qualification or relegation
1	Shelbourne (C, R)	30	18	8	4	60	27	+33	62	Demotion to League of Ireland First Division (Note: During the season, The Revenue Commissioners took High Court action and threatened to have Shelbourne wound up after it failed to pay more than €104,000 in outstanding taxes. Shelbourne also struggled to pay its players during the season. However Shelbourne's off field problems did not prevent them from winning the title. Shelbourne's celebrations were cut short when the league decided to demote them to the First Division. They also withdrew from the 2007–08 UEFA Champions League and 2007 Setanta Sports Cup because of their financial difficulties.)
2	Derry City (Q)	30	18	8	4	46	20	+26	62	Qualification to Champions League first qualifying round
3	Drogheda United (Q)	30	16	10	4	37	23	+14	58	Qualification to UEFA Cup first qualifying round
4	Cork City (Q)	30	15	11	4	37	15	+22	56	Qualification to Intertoto Cup first round
5	Sligo Rovers	30	11	7	12	33	42	−9	40	
6	UCD	30	9	11	10	26	26	0	38	
7	St Patrick's Athletic (Q)	30	9	10	11	32	29	+3	37	Qualification to UEFA Cup first qualifying round (Note: St Patrick's Athletic qualified for the UEFA Cup first qualifying round after reaching the 2006 FAI Cup Final.)
8	Longford Town	30	8	10	12	23	27	−4	34	
9	Bohemians (Note: Bohemians were deducted three points for fielding Jason McGuinness while he was suspended.)	30	9	5	16	29	34	−5	29	
10	Bray Wanderers	30	3	8	19	22	64	−42	17	
11	Waterford United (Note: Waterford United lost promotion/relegation play-off but subsequently replaced Shelbourne for the 2007 season.) (L)	30	2	6	22	20	58	−38	12	Qualification to Relegation play-off
12	Dublin City (D, R)	0	0	0	0	0	0	0	0	Withdrew from league (Note: Dublin City withdrew from league on 18 July. All their results were expunged.)

(C) Champions; (D) Disqualified; (L) Lost the relegation play-off but reprieved later; (Q) Qualified for the phase indicated; (R) Relegated

== Results ==
=== Matches 1–20 ===
Home \ Away	BOH	BRW	COR	DER	DRO	LON	SHE	SLI	StP	UCD	WAT
Bohemians	—	3–0	0–0	1–2	0–1	0–1	2–1	0–2	0–0	2–1	4–2
Bray Wanderers	0–3	—	0–0	2–3	0–1	1–0	2–2	1–2	1–2	1–1	3–1
Cork City	1–0	6–0	—	1–0	1–0	2–1	2–1	2–0	0–0	1–0	2–0
Derry City	1–0	3–0	2–0	—	1–2	1–0	2–0	3–1	3–1	2–0	4–0
Drogheda United	1–0	1–0	0–0	3–1	—	1–0	1–3	2–2	2–1	1–0	4–0
Longford Town	3–1	1–0	0–2	0–1	0–0	—	0–0	0–0	2–0	0–0	3–0
Shelbourne	2–0	4–1	2–2	1–0	2–1	0–0	—	3–0	3–0	6–0	5–1
Sligo Rovers	1–0	2–0	0–3	3–1	0–0	3–1	1–1	—	1–1	0–1	3–1
St Patrick's Athletic	0–1	3–0	2–0	1–1	0–1	0–0	2–2	3–1	—	0–0	0–0
UCD	0–1	4–1	0–0	0–0	0–0	2–2	1–2	3–0	0–1	—	2–1
Waterford United	1–3	1–1	0–0	1–2	2–3	0–0	0–1	1–2	1–3	0–1	—

Legend: Blue = home team win; Yellow = draw; Red = away team win.

=== Matches 21–30 ===
Home \ Away	BOH	BRW	COR	DER	DRO	LON	SHE	SLI	StP	UCD	WAT
Bohemians	—	1–1	—	—	2–2	—	—	—	0–1	0–1	3–1
Bray Wanderers	—	—	2–1	—	—	0–2	2–3	1–1	—	—	—
Cork City	1–0	—	—	—	—	1–1	1–0	2–0	—	—	4–1
Derry City	1–1	0–0	1–0	—	0–0	—	—	4–0	—	0–0	—
Drogheda United	—	1–1	0–0	—	—	2–0	—	—	—	1–0	1–0
Longford Town	3–0	—	—	0–2	—	—	—	0–2	0–0	—	—
Shelbourne	2–1	—	—	2–2	2–2	2–0	—	—	—	—	—
Sligo Rovers	1–0	—	—	—	2–3	—	0–2	—	3–2	—	0–0
St Patrick's Athletic	—	5–1	0–1	0–1	3–0	—	1–3	—	—	—	0–1
UCD	—	4–0	1–1	—	—	3–1	0–2	1–0	0–0	—	—
Waterford United	—	3–0	—	0–1	—	1–2	0–1	—	—	0–0	—

Legend: Blue = home team win; Yellow = draw; Red = away team win.

== Promotion/relegation play-off ==
Dundalk who finished second in the 2006 League of Ireland First Division played off against Waterford United who finished eleventh in Premier Division.

1st Leg

22 November 2006	Dundalk	1–1	Waterford United

2nd Leg

25 November 2006	Waterford United	1–2	Dundalk

Dundalk won 3–2 on aggregate but did not meet the criteria set out by the FAI's Independent Assessment Group and were not promoted.

== Independent Assessment Group ==
In March 2006 it was announced that the League of Ireland and the FAI would be merging. As part of this arrangement the league would be restructured and membership of the 2007 Premier Division and 2007 First Division would be decided by an Independent Assessment Group established by John Delaney and chaired by a former FAI honorary secretary, Des Casey. Former Republic of Ireland international footballer, Niall Quinn was originally a member of the group. However he later withdrew because of his growing commitments to Sunderland A.F.C. He was replaced by Richard Collins, a former chairman of and current director of Charlton Athletic. Other members of the group included John Fitzgerald, the former city manager of Dublin City Council and Pat O'Neill, a former chairman of the Irish Sports Council. The IAG effectively performed a financial stress test on the League of Ireland member clubs. Clubs were assessed on their past five season record in the league. Crucially though, clubs would also be graded on off-field criteria, including attendance, infrastructure, governance, strategic planning, finance, youth development and marketing. The IAG announced their results in December 2006. However the final outcome of the IAG decision was further complicated by the financial difficulties of Shelbourne who, despite initially passing the stress test, were subsequently relegated to the First Division. This provided a reprieve for Waterford United, ranked at thirteen by the IAG, who were selected to replace them.

=== IAG Table ===
Pos	Team	Off field	On field	Total	
1	Derry City	370	460	830	
2	Cork City	348	460	808	
3	Bohemians	372	423	795	
4	Shelbourne (Note: Shelbourne were relegated to the First Division for financial irregularities.)	278	493	771	Relegated to First Division
5	St Patrick's Athletic	364	407	771	
6	UCD	374	370	744	
7	Drogheda United	300	437	737	
8	Shamrock Rovers	346	377	723	Promoted to Premier Division
9	Longford Town	284	430	714	
10	Sligo Rovers	360	343	703	
11	Bray Wanderers	351	333	684	
12	Galway United (Note: Galway United were promoted after passing the criteria set out by the FAI's Independent Assessment Group.)	389	267	656	Promoted to Premier Division
13	Waterford United (Note: Waterford United lost promotion/relegation play-off but subsequently replaced Shelbourne for the 2007 season.)	296	340	636	Remained in Premier Division
14	Dundalk (Note: Dundalk's 'on field' results from the previous five seasons dropped their position from eighth to 14th in the IAG table and, as a result, they were not promoted - despite winning the promotion/relegation play-off.)	348	247	595	Remained in First Division
15	Finn Harps	310	283	593	
16	Cobh Ramblers	315	240	555	
17	Monaghan United	331	173	504	
18	Kildare County	265	230	495	
19	Athlone Town	305	177	482	
20	Kilkenny City	266	177	443	
21	Limerick	-	243	243	
22	Dublin City (Note: Dublin City withdrew from league on 18 July. All their results were expunged.)	-	-	-	Withdrew from league

== UEFA coefficient ==
The League of Ireland Premier Division's UEFA coefficient accumulated to a total value of 6.498 for the 2006–07 European season.

League's 2006 UEFA ranking

- 33 Finland
- 34 Moldova
- 35 (Republic of Ireland) Ireland
- 36 (Georgia (country)) Georgia
- 37 Liechtenstein

== Top-scorers ==
Player	Club	League goals	Cup goals	Total
(Republic of Ireland) Jason Byrne	Shelbourne	15	8	23
(Republic of Ireland) Mark Farren	Derry City	9	8	17
(Republic of Ireland) Glen Crowe	Shelbourne	12	4	16
(Republic of Ireland) Ciarán Martyn	Derry City	8	7	15
(Republic of Ireland) Declan O'Brien	Drogheda United	11	3	14

== Awards ==
SWAI eircom League Player of the Month award

Month	Winner	Club
March	(Republic of Ireland) Paul Keegan	Drogheda United
April	(Republic of Ireland) Jason Gavin	Drogheda United
May	(Northern Ireland) Pat McCourt	Derry City
June	(Republic of Ireland) Paul McTiernan	Sligo Rovers
July	(Cameroon) Joseph Ndo	Shelbourne
August	(Republic of Ireland) Kevin Deery	Derry City
September	(Northern Ireland) Darren Kelly	Derry City
October	(Republic of Ireland) Philip Hughes	Dundalk
November	(Republic of Ireland) Roy O'Donovan	Cork City

PFAI eircom League Player of the Year award

- Joseph Ndo – Shelbourne

PFAI eircom League Young Player of the Year award

- Kevin Deery – Derry City

TV3's Goal of the Season award

- Kevin Deery – Derry City

== Attendances ==
Premier Division games had an average attendance of 1,539 people. Derry City's average home attendance of 3,127 was the highest of any league team for the season. The record for the highest attendance in the Premier Division was also set in the Brandywell Stadium on the last night of the season when Derry City met Cork City. 6,080 attended the game.

== See also ==
- 2006 Shelbourne F.C. season
- 2006 League of Ireland First Division
- 2006 League of Ireland Cup
