= 2005 League of Ireland Cup =

Tournament details
- Country: Ireland

The League of Ireland Cup 2005 was the 32nd staging of the League of Ireland Cup.

The 2005 League Cup kicked off in May. A representative team of the Mayo League joined the 22 league clubs in the draw. There were fourteen clubs drawn to face each other in the first round, with the rest given byes to the second round.

== First round ==
Matches played on 30 May and 31 May 2005.

Tie no	Home team	Score	Away team
1	Dublin City	1–3	UCD
2	Dundalk	2–4	St Patrick's Athletic
3	Limerick	2–2	Waterford United
Waterford United won 4–1 on penalties
4	Bray Wanderers	0–3	Shamrock Rovers
5	Derry City	2–1	Mayo League
6	Monaghan United	2–0	Athlone Town
7	Sligo Rovers	1–0	Finn Harps

== Second round ==
Matches played between 20 June and 26 June 2005.

Tie no	Home team	Score	Away team
1	Cork City	3–0	Kilkenny City
2	UCD	1–0	Shamrock Rovers
3	Bohemians	1–3	St Patrick's Athletic
4	Cobh Ramblers	0–1	Waterford United
5	Drogheda United	2–1	Monaghan United
6	Shelbourne	2–1	Kildare County
7	Sligo Rovers	0–2	Longford Town
8	Derry City	2–1	Galway United

== Quarter-finals ==
Matches played on 4 July and 5 July 2005.

Tie no	Home team	Score	Away team
1	UCD	1–0	Waterford United
2	Shelbourne	2–1	St Patrick's Athletic
3	Cork City	0–1	Longford Town
4	Derry City	2–2	Drogheda United
Derry City won 5–4 on penalties

== Semi-finals ==
2005-08-22

Shelbourne	1–2	UCD
Hawkins 85'		Gannon 90'; Martin 90'

Tolka Park, Dublin

2005-08-23

Derry City	2–1	Longford Town
Farren 42', 48'		Ferguson 71'

The Brandywell, Derry City

== Final ==
2005-09-20

UCD	1–2	Derry City
Byrne 40'		Murphy 14'; McWalter 45' (o.g.)

Belfield Park, Dublin
Attendance: 2,150
Referee: Damien Hancock

League of Ireland Cup Winner 2005

Derry City
6th Title
