= Glen Crowe =

Irish professional football forward

Personal information
- Date of birth: 25 December 1977 (age 48)
- Place of birth: Dublin, Ireland
- Height: 1.81 m (5 ft 11 in)
- Position: Forward

Youth career
- 1985–: St. Mochta's
- –1995: Stella Maris

Senior career*
Years	Team	Apps	(Gls)
1995–1999	Wolverhampton Wanderers	10	(1)
1997	→ Exeter City (loan)	10	(5)
1997	→ Cardiff City (loan)	8	(1)
1998	→ Exeter City (loan)	9	(0)
1999	Plymouth Argyle	11	(1)
1999–2004	Bohemians	180	(110)
2005–2006	Shelbourne	56	(20)
2007–2009	Bohemians	93	(23)
2010	Sporting Fingal	33	(6)
Total		410	(168)

International career
1998	Republic of Ireland U21	1	(0)
2002–2003	Republic of Ireland	2	(0)
- * Club domestic league appearances and goals

Glen Crowe (born 25 December 1977) is an Irish former professional football forward.

He was a prolific goalscorer in the League of Ireland Premier Division and has represented the Republic of Ireland national football team on two occasions.

Crowe previously played for Wolves, Bohemians, Shelbourne and Sporting Fingal.

== Family ==
Glen Crowe's grandad is Liam Crowe, who played football for the Irish Army, including a match against the Republic of Ireland national football team on 23 April 1944. Liam Crowe also played for Shamrock Rovers and won the FAI Cup in 1944. He also played for Shelbourne, St Patrick's Athletic, Dundalk and St James's Gate.

== Club career ==
=== Wolverhampton Wanderers ===
Crowe began his career with local Irish side St Mochta's, joining the youth setup at the age of 7. Stella Maris showed an interest in Crowe for several years and he eventually signed for the club and played in the Dublin & District Schoolboy League. At the age of 17, Crowe spent time on trial with Division One side Wolverhampton Wanderers, attending three separate trials with the club before being offered a one-year YTS contract. He spent the majority of his first season at Molineux in the youth team but was handed his professional debut on 30 April 1996 as a substitute during a 3–0 defeat to Reading. In the following match, the final game of the 1995–96 season, Crowe started his first match for Wolves against Charlton Athletic in May 1996 and scored his side's only goal during a 1–1 draw. He had loan spells at Cardiff City, Exeter City and Plymouth Argyle.

=== Bohemians and Shelbourne ===
Crowe returned to Dublin to join Bohemians, managed by Roddy Collins, in pre-season 1999.

After scoring on his League of Ireland debut on 19 September 1999 in a 3–1 loss to Shamrock Rovers , Crowe ended up as top scorer for Bohemians in his first season with 9 league goals. The following season (2000/01), Glen formed a potent partnership with new-signing Trevor Molloy and broke the League goal-scoring record by hitting 25 league goals (35 in all competitions) as Bohemians won their first league title since 1978 and their first league and FAI Cup double since 1928. He also scored in Bohemians' UEFA Cup run, both home and away against 1. FC Kaiserslautern. This form led Mick McCarthy to call him into the international squad in the summer of 2001 for the World Cup qualifiers against Portugal and Estonia.

Crowe once again starred as Bohemians won their 2nd league title in 3 years in 2003, but left the team for Dublin rivals Shelbourne in a controversial move in December 2004 where he formed a successful partnership with Jason Byrne. He claimed his third league winning medal in November 2006, ironically scoring the winning goal against his old club Bohemians to clinch Shelbourne's third title in four seasons.

Crowe re-joined Bohemians in early 2007 where he continued to show his goalscoring skills. On 4 April 2008, he broke the previous record of 121 goals against Shamrock Rovers to surpass the record previously held by Turlough O'Connor. Bohemians romped to the 2008 Premier Division title by 19 points from their nearest challengers St Patrick's Athletic, and Crowe also scored in the FAI Cup Final as Bohemians won the trophy to complete a "Double". He scored against Rhyl F.C. in the 2008 UEFA Intertoto Cup .

Crowe struggled for form during the 2009 season and found himself out of the starting XI on many occasions when Paddy Madden returned from his loan spell at Shelbourne. However Glen collected his first ever League Cup winners medal in the September as Bohemians beat Waterford United 3–1 at the RSC. And Crowe collected his fifth League winners medal (fourth at Bohemians) in November as they won the title.

=== Sporting Fingal ===
Crowe was released by Bohemians in November 2009 after his contract expired. In January 2010, he signed for Sporting Fingal in advance of the club's first season in the League of Ireland top flight.

Crowe scored his 11th European goal at C.S. Marítimo in the 2010–11 UEFA Europa League.

== International career ==
Crowe played for the Republic of Ireland national under-19 football team in the 1996 UEFA European Under-18 Championship finals in Luxembourg and was part of the squad for the 1997 FIFA World Youth Championship in Malaysia. Due to the extreme humidity that they would encounter, Crowe and the squad trained in raincoats for a week at the University of Limerick to prepare for the tournament. Ireland finished in third place after winning a third place play-off match against Ghana.

In November 2002, as a Bohemians player, Crowe became the first League of Ireland player to be capped by Ireland for 16 years (the last being Pat Byrne of Shamrock Rovers) when Don Givens selected him in a friendly international against Greece which finished 0-0. He won his second cap for Ireland in April 2003, coming on as a late substitute in a 1-0 friendly international win against Norway at Lansdowne Road.

== Honours ==
=== Club ===
Individual

- PFAI Players' Player of the Year
  - 2000–01, 2002–03: 2
- SWAI Personality of the Year:
  - 2000–01, 2002–03: 2
- League of Ireland Player of the Year:
  - 2000–01, 2001–02: 2
- League of Ireland Premier Division Top Scorer
  - 2000–01, 2001–02, 2002–03: 3

Bohemians

- League of Ireland Premier Division:
  - 2000–01, 2002–03, 2008, 2009: 4
- FAI Cup:
  - 2001, 2008: 2
- League of Ireland Cup:
  - 2009: 1

Shelbourne

- League of Ireland Premier Division:
  - 2006

Republic of Ireland

- FIFA World Youth Championship:
  - Third Place: 1997

== Records ==
At the end of the 2020 League of Ireland season Crowe is seventh in the all-time League of Ireland goalscoring list with 159 league goals

- He became the first League of Ireland player to be capped by Ireland for 16 years in November 2002.
- Crowe is Bohemians all-time leading league goalscorer with 133 goals
- Crowe is Bohemians all-time leading FAI Cup goalscorer with 22 goals
- Crowe is Bohemians all-time leading goalscorer in European football.
