= 2002 UEFA Intertoto Cup =

Tournament details
- Dates: 22 June 2002 – 27 August 2002
- Teams: 60

Final positions
- Champions: (Spain) Málaga (England) Fulham (Germany) Stuttgart

Tournament statistics
- Matches played: 114
- Goals scored: 282 (2.47 per match)

The 2002 UEFA Intertoto Cup finals were won by Málaga, Fulham, and Stuttgart. All three teams advanced to the UEFA Cup.

== First round ==
| Team 1 | Agg. | Team 2 | 1st leg | 2nd leg |
|---|---|---|---|---|
| Rijeka (Croatia) | 3–3(a) | (Republic of Ireland) St Patrick's Athletic | 3–2 | 0–1 |
| Lokeren (Belgium) | 5–4 | (Georgia (country)) WIT Georgia | 3–1 | 2–3 |
| Santa Clara (Portugal) | 5–3 | (Armenia) Shirak | 2–0 | 3–3 |
| BATE Borisov (Belarus) | 3–0 | (Denmark) AB | 1–0 | 2–0 |
| Obilić (Federal Republic of Yugoslavia) | 2–3 | (Finland) Haka | 1–2 | 1–1 |
| Zürich (Switzerland) | 8–2 | (Bosnia and Herzegovina) Brotnjo | 7–0 | 1–2 |
| Gloria Bistrița (Romania) | 2–0 | Union Luxembourg | 2–0 | 0–0 |
| Laugaricio Trenčín (Slovakia) | 3–6 | (Croatia) Slaven Belupo | 3–1 | 0–5 |
| Constructorul Cioburciu (Moldova) | 0–4 | (Czech Republic) Synot | 0–0 | 0–4 |
| Helsingborg (Sweden) | 1–0 | (Slovenia) Koper | 1–0 | 0–0 |
| Budapest Honvéd (Hungary) | 0–1 | (Lithuania) Žalgiris | 0–1 | 0–0 |
| St. Gallen (Switzerland) | 11–1 | (Faroe Islands) B68 Toftir | 5–1 | 6–0 |
| Zagłębie Lubin (Poland) | 1–2 | (Latvia) Dinaburg | 1–1 | 0–1 |
| Brno (Czech Republic) | 1–6 | (Israel) Ashdod | 0–5 | 1–1 |
| Enosis Neon Paralimni (Cyprus) | 1–5 | (Austria) Bregenz | 0–2 | 1–3 |
| União de Leiria (Portugal) | 2–4 | (Estonia) Levadia | 0–3 | 2–1 |
| Valletta (Malta) | 1–2 | (Albania) Teuta | 1–2 | 0–0 |
| Coleraine (Northern Ireland) | 7–2 | (Andorra) Sant Julià | 5–0 | 2–2 |
| Marek (Bulgaria) | 3–1 | (Wales) Caersws | 2–0 | 1–1 |
| Cementarnica 55 (North Macedonia) | 3–4 | (Iceland) FH | 1–3 | 2–1 |

=== First leg ===
22 June 2002

| Rijeka (Croatia) | 3–2 | (Republic of Ireland) St Patrick's Athletic |
|---|---|---|
| Vincetić 53'; Klić 89', 90' | | Osam 44'; McCarthy 77' |

Stadion Kantrida, Rijeka
Attendance: 3,000
Referee: Loizos Loizou (Cyprus)

22 June 2002

| Lokeren (Belgium) | 3–1 | (Georgia (country)) WIT Georgia |
|---|---|---|
| Zoundi 22'; Grétarsson 45' (pen.); Kristinsson 86' | | Dolidze 13' (pen.) |

Daknamstadion, Lokeren
Attendance: 1,453
Referee: Siniša Zrnić (Bosnia and Herzegovina)

23 June 2002
22:00

| Santa Clara (Portugal) | 2–0 | (Armenia) Shirak |
|---|---|---|
| João Pedro 57'; Brandão 83' | Report |

Estádio de São Miguel, Ponta Delgada
Attendance: 4,257
Referee: Anthony Zammit (Malta)

22 June 2002

| BATE Borisov (Belarus) | 1–0 | (Denmark) AB |
|---|---|---|
| Kontsevoy 10' |

Haradski Stadium, Barysaw
Attendance: 1,100
Referee: Meir Levi (Israel)

23 June 2002

| Obilić (Federal Republic of Yugoslavia) | 1–2 | (Finland) Haka |
|---|---|---|
| Filipović 61' (pen.) | | Kovács 11'; Kangaskorpi 70' |

FK Obilić Stadium, Belgrade
Attendance: 1,200
Referee: Duarte Gomes (Portugal)

22 June 2002

| Zürich (Switzerland) | 7–0 | (Bosnia and Herzegovina) Brotnjo |
|---|---|---|
| Keita 5', 33'; Akalé 63', 70', 72', 90'; Gygax 67' |

Letzigrund, Zürich
Attendance: 1,100
Referee: Augustus Constantin (Romania)

23 June 2002

| Gloria Bistrița (Romania) | 2–0 | Union Luxembourg |
|---|---|---|
| Sânmărtean 15'; Bârsan 24' |

Stadionul Gloria, Bistrița
Attendance: 2,500
Referee: Paulius Malžinskas (Lithuania)

22 June 2002

| Laugaricio Trenčín (Slovakia) | 3–1 | (Croatia) Slaven Belupo |
|---|---|---|
| Fabuš 23' (pen.), 74'; Ďuriš 42' | | Dodik 76' |

Štadión na Sihoti, Trenčín
Attendance: 1,700
Referee: Delče Jakimovski (Macedonia)

22 June 2002

| Constructorul Cioburciu (Moldova) | 0–0 | (Czech Republic) Synot |

Stadionul Municipal, Tiraspol
Attendance: 1,500
Referee: Dimitar Dimitrov (Bulgaria)

23 June 2002

| Helsingborg (Sweden) | 1–0 | (Slovenia) Koper |
|---|---|---|
| Ekenberg 84' |

Olympia, Helsingborg
Attendance: 1,874
Referee: Egill Markusson (Iceland)

22 June 2002

| Budapest Honvéd (Hungary) | 0–1 | (Lithuania) Žalgiris |
|---|---|---|
| | | Saulėnas 83' |

Bozsik József Stadion, Budapest
Attendance: 1,000
Referee: Sead Kulović (Bosnia and Herzegovina)

22 June 2002

| St. Gallen (Switzerland) | 5–1 | (Faroe Islands) B68 Toftir |
|---|---|---|
| Tachie-Mensah 9', 82' (pen.), 90+'; Gane 42' (pen.); Imhof 56' | | J.I. Petersen 76' |

Espenmoos, St. Gallen
Attendance: 5,700
Referee: Sokol Jareci (Albania)

23 June 2002

| Zagłębie Lubin (Poland) | 1–1 | (Latvia) Dinaburg |
|---|---|---|
| Grzybowski 31' | | Pelcis 28' |

Stadion Zagłębia Lubin, Lubin
Attendance: 300
Referee: Brian Lawlor (Wales)

23 June 2002

| Brno (Czech Republic) | 0–5 | (Israel) Ashdod |
|---|---|---|
| | | Fadida 23'; Hazan 35', 80'; Revivo 63'; Ohayon 89' |

Městský fotbalový stadion Srbská, Brno
Attendance: 750
Referee: Robert Krajnc (Slovenia)

22 June 2002

| Enosis Neon Paralimni (Cyprus) | 0–2 | (Austria) Bregenz |
|---|---|---|
| | | Rosický 24'; Lawarée 52' |

Paralimni Stadium, Paralimni
Attendance: 300
Referee: Valentin Ivanov (Russia)

23 June 2002

| União de Leiria (Portugal) | 0–3 | (Estonia) Levadia Tallinn |
|---|---|---|
| Silas 77' |

Estádio Dr. Magalhães Pessoa, Leiria
Attendance: 1,000
Referee: Sergo Kvaratskhelia (Georgia)

The game was awarded to Levadia Tallinn with a score of 3–0 due to União de Leiria fielding an ineligible player Roudolphe Douala.

22 June 2002

| Valletta (Malta) | 1–2 | (Albania) Teuta |
|---|---|---|
| G. Agius 80' | | Begeja 10'; Imeraj 72' |

Hibernians Stadium, Paola
Attendance: 231
Referee: José Luis Mengual (Andorra)

22 June 2002

| Coleraine (Northern Ireland) | 5–0 | (Andorra) Sant Julià |
|---|---|---|
| Gaston 17'; McHugh 23'; Armstrong 75'; Ramirez 90' (o.g.); Curran 90' |

The Showgrounds, Coleraine
Attendance: 350
Referee: Imankhan Sultani (Azerbaijan)

22 June 2002

| Marek (Bulgaria) | 2–0 | (Wales) Caersws |
|---|---|---|
| Vladov 65', 80' |

Bonchuk Stadium, Dupnitsa
Attendance: 1,500
Referee: Luc Wilmes (Luxembourg)

22 June 2002

| Cementarnica 55 (North Macedonia) | 1–3 | (Iceland) FH |
|---|---|---|
| Beganović 77' | | Trakys 32', 64'; Sævarsson 80' |

Gradski Stadion, Skopje
Attendance: 450
Referee: Alan Kelly (Republic of Ireland)

=== Second leg ===
30 June 2002

| St Patrick's Athletic (Republic of Ireland) | 1–0 | (Croatia) Rijeka |
|---|---|---|
| Mbabazi 22' | Report |

Richmond Park, Dublin
Attendance: 2,350
Referee: Gevorg Hovhannisyan (Armenia)

3–3 on aggregate, St Patrick's Athletic won on away goals rule.

29 June 2002

| WIT Georgia (Georgia (country)) | 3–2 | (Belgium) Lokeren |
|---|---|---|
| Gochashvili 44'; Kipiani 61'; Tsutsunava 90' | | Sylla 14'; Kimoto 53' |

Mikheil Meskhi Stadium, Tbilisi
Attendance: 950
Referee: Michael Ross (Northern Ireland)

Lokeren won 5–4 on aggregate.

30 June 2002
15:00

| Shirak (Armenia) | 3–3 | (Portugal) Santa Clara |
|---|---|---|
| Harutyunyan 37', 75' (pen.); Aleksanyan 90' | Report | João Pedro 30', 35', 47' |

Gyumri City Stadium, Gyumri
Attendance: 1,400
Referee: Aleh Chykun (Belarus)

Santa Clara won 5–3 on aggregate.

29 June 2002

| AB (Denmark) | 0–2 | (Belarus) BATE Borisov |
|---|---|---|
| | | Kontsevoy 34'; Byahanski 42' |

Gladsaxe Stadium, Copenhagen
Attendance: 800
Referee: Dejan Stanišić (FR Yugoslavia)

BATE Borisov won 4–0 on aggregate.

30 June 2002

| Haka (Finland) | 1–1 | (Federal Republic of Yugoslavia) Obilić |
|---|---|---|
| Kovács 78' | | Mladenović 44' |

Tehtaan kenttä, Valkeakoski
Attendance: 1,549
Referee: Roland Beck (Liechtenstein)

Haka won 3–2 on aggregate.

29 June 2002

| Brotnjo (Bosnia and Herzegovina) | 2–1 | (Switzerland) Zürich |
|---|---|---|
| Ćorić 67'; Krivić 77' | | Keita 50' |

Bare Stadium, Čitluk
Attendance: 138
Referee: Costas Theodotou (Cyprus)

Zürich won 8–2 on aggregate.

29 June 2002

| Union Luxembourg | 0–0 | (Romania) Gloria Bistrița |

Stade Achille Hammerel, Luxembourg City
Attendance: 350
Referee: Khagani Mammadov (Azerbaijan)

Gloria Bistrița won 2–0 on aggregate.

29 June 2002

| Slaven Belupo (Croatia) | 5–0 | (Slovakia) Laugaricio Trenčín |
|---|---|---|
| Kosić 24'; Dodik 26', 90'; Kovačić 33', 53' |

Gradski stadion, Koprivnica
Attendance: 2,500
Referee: Ceri Richards (Wales)

Slaven Belupo won 6–3 on aggregate.

30 June 2002

| Synot (Czech Republic) | 4–0 | (Moldova) Constructorul Cioburciu |
|---|---|---|
| Meduna 46', 55'; Palinek 50'; Mica 87' |

Stadion Širůch, Staré Město
Attendance: 1,529
Referee: Alojzije Šupraha (Croatia)

Synot won 4–0 on aggregate.

29 June 2002

| Koper (Slovenia) | 0–0 | (Sweden) Helsingborg |

Bonifika Stadium, Koper
Attendance: 1,000
Referee: Sašo Lazarevski (Macedonia)

Helsingborgs won 1–0 on aggregate.

29 June 2002

| Žalgiris (Lithuania) | 0–0 | (Hungary) Budapest Honvéd |

Žalgiris Stadium, Vilnius
Attendance: 1,000
Referee: Lassin Isaksen (Faroe Islands)

Žalgiris won 1–0 on aggregate.

29 June 2002

| B68 Toftir (Faroe Islands) | 0–6 | (Switzerland) St. Gallen |
|---|---|---|
| | | Tachie-Mensah 5'; Gane 14', 73', 85'; Imhof 40'; Bieli 61' |

Svangaskarð, Toftir
Attendance: 145
Referee: Darius Miezelis (Lithuania)

St. Gallen won 11–1 on aggregate.

30 June 2002

| Dinaburg (Latvia) | 1–0 | (Poland) Zagłębie Lubin |
|---|---|---|
| Derjugin 8' |

Celtnieks Stadium, Daugavpils
Attendance: 980
Referee: Jaromír Hlaváč (Czech Republic)

Dinaburg won 2–1 on aggregate.

29 June 2002

| Ashdod (Israel) | 1–1 | (Czech Republic) Brno |
|---|---|---|
| Perets 81' | | Pacanda 88' |

Mestský štadión, Dunajská Streda
Attendance: 300
Referee: Spiridon Papadakos (Greece)

Ashdod won 6–1 on aggregate.

29 June 2002

| Bregenz (Austria) | 3–1 | (Cyprus) Enosis Neon Paralimni |
|---|---|---|
| Rosický 27'; Lawarée 49'; Hlinka 79' | | Goumenos 18' |

Casino Stadium, Bregenz
Attendance: 1,700
Referee: Anton Genov (Bulgaria)

Bregenz won 5–1 on aggregate.

30 June 2002

| Levadia Tallinn (Estonia) | 1–2 | (Portugal) União de Leiria |
|---|---|---|
| Leitan 52' | | Douala 80', 82' |

Kadriorg Stadium, Tallinn
Attendance: 700
Referee: Jari Maisonlathi (Finland)

Levadia Tallinn won 4–2 on aggregate.

29 June 2002

| Teuta (Albania) | 0–0 | (Malta) Valletta |

Qemal Stafa Stadium, Tirana
Attendance: 300
Referee: Robert Johnsdorf (Luxembourg)

Teuta won 2–1 on aggregate.

29 June 2002

| Sant Julià (Andorra) | 2–2 | (Northern Ireland) Coleraine |
|---|---|---|
| Petit 20' (pen.); Sonejee 65' | | McHugh 8'; McAuley 85' |

Estadi Comunal d'Andorra la Vella, Andorra la Vella
Attendance: 250
Referee: Levan Paniashvili (Georgia)

Coleraine won 7–2 on aggregate.

29 June 2002

| Caersws (Wales) | 1–1 | (Bulgaria) Marek |
|---|---|---|
| Evans 19' | | Shankulov 49' |

Park Avenue, Aberystwyth
Attendance: 1,212
Referee: Ghenadie Orlic (Moldova)

Marek won 3–1 on aggregate.

29 June 2002

| FH (Iceland) | 1–2 | (North Macedonia) Cementarnica 55 |
|---|---|---|
| Sævarsson 10' | | Toleski 24'; Naumov 52' |

Laugardalsvöllur, Reykjavík
Attendance: 636
Referee: Oleg Timofeev (Estonia)

FH won 4–3 on aggregate.

== Second round ==
| Team 1 | Agg. | Team 2 | 1st leg | 2nd leg |
|---|---|---|---|---|
| Slaven Belupo (Croatia) | 3–0 | (Portugal) Belenenses | 2–0 | 1–0 |
| Coleraine (Northern Ireland) | 2–4 | (France) Troyes | 1–2 | 1–2 |
| 1860 Munich (Germany) | 0–5 | (Belarus) BATE Borisov | 0–1 | 0–4 |
| Villarreal (Spain) | 4–2 | (Iceland) FH | 2–0 | 2–2 |
| Fulham (England) | (a)1–1 | (Finland) Haka | 0–0 | 1–1 |
| Sochaux (France) | 4–1 | (Lithuania) Žalgiris | 2–0 | 2–1 |
| Gent (Belgium) | (a)3–3 | (Republic of Ireland) St Patrick's Athletic | 2–0 | 1–3 |
| Stuttgart (Germany) | 3–0 | (Belgium) Lokeren | 2–0 | 1–0 |
| Torino (Italy) | 2–1 | (Austria) Bregenz | 1–0 | 1–1 |
| Krylia Sovetov (Russia) | 4–0 | (Latvia) Dinaburg | 3–0 | 1–0 |
| Teplice (Czech Republic) | 9–2 | (Portugal) Santa Clara | 5–1 | 4–1 |
| Willem II (Netherlands) | 2–1 | (Switzerland) St. Gallen | 1–0 | 1–1(aet) |
| Zürich (Switzerland) | 1–0 | (Estonia) Levadia | 1–0 | 0–0 |
| Synot (Czech Republic) | 4–2 | (Sweden) Helsingborg | 4–0 | 0–2 |
| Gloria Bistrița (Romania) | 3–1 | (Albania) Teuta | 3–0 | 0–1 |
| Ashdod (Israel) | 1–2 | (Bulgaria) Marek | 1–1 | 0–1 |

=== First leg ===
6 July 2002

| Slaven Belupo (Croatia) | 2–0 | (Portugal) Belenenses |
|---|---|---|
| Dodik 25'; Kovačić 77' |

Gradski stadion, Koprivnica
Attendance: 2,000
Referee: Vasyl Melnychuk (Ukraine)

6 July 2002

| Coleraine (Northern Ireland) | 1–2 | (France) Troyes |
|---|---|---|
| McCoosh 51' (pen.) | | Niang 45+'; Goussé 59' |

The Showgrounds, Coleraine
Attendance: 681
Referee: Joseph Attard (Malta)

7 July 2002

| 1860 Munich (Germany) | 0–1 | (Belarus) BATE Borisov |
|---|---|---|
| | | Kontsevoy 74' |

Grünwalder Stadion, Munich
Attendance: 25,000
Referee: Ali Aydin (Turkey)

6 July 2002

| Villarreal (Spain) | 2–0 | (Iceland) FH |
|---|---|---|
| Víctor 31'; Galván 64' |

Estadio El Madrigal, Villarreal
Attendance: 8,000
Referee: Edgar Sorin Altmayer (Romania)

6 July 2002

| Fulham (England) | 0–0 | (Finland) Haka |

Craven Cottage, London
Attendance: 7,908
Referee: Ladislav Gádoši (Slovakia)

6 July 2002

| Sochaux (France) | 2–0 | (Lithuania) Žalgiris |
|---|---|---|
| Monsoreau 24'; Frau 55' |

Stade Auguste Bonal, Montbéliard
Attendance: 7,476
Referee: Andrejs Sipailo (Latvia)

6 July 2002

| Gent (Belgium) | 2–0 | (Republic of Ireland) St Patrick's Athletic |
|---|---|---|
| Kaklamanos 1', 66' |

Jules Ottenstadion, Ghent
Attendance: 2,901
Referee: Jaroslav Jára (Czech Republic)

7 July 2002

| Stuttgart (Germany) | 2–0 | (Belgium) Lokeren |
|---|---|---|
| Seitz 7'; Dundee 54' |

Gottlieb-Daimler-Stadion, Stuttgart
Attendance: 5,500
Referee: Carlo Bertolini (Switzerland)

7 July 2002

| Torino (Italy) | 1–0 | (Austria) Bregenz |
|---|---|---|
| Ferrante 17' |

Stadio delle Alpi, Turin
Attendance: 12,338
Referee: Espen Berntsen (Norway)

6 July 2002

| Krylia Sovetov (Russia) | 3–0 | (Latvia) Dinaburg |
|---|---|---|
| Karyaka 38'; Poškus 72'; Gaúcho 74' |

Metallurg Stadium, Samara
Attendance: 9,936
Referee: Jonas Eriksson (Sweden)

7 July 2002

| Teplice (Czech Republic) | 5–1 | (Portugal) Santa Clara |
|---|---|---|
| Gross 10'; Divecký 66', 68'; Leitner 71'; Verbíř 87' | | João Pedro 85' |

Na Stínadlech, Teplice
Attendance: 2,300
Referee: Attila Abraham (Hungary)

6 July 2002

| Willem II (Netherlands) | 1–0 | (Switzerland) St. Gallen |
|---|---|---|
| Caluwé 14' |

Koning Willem II Stadion, Tilburg
Attendance: 2,937
Referee: Romāns Lajuks (Latvia)

6 July 2002

| Zürich (Switzerland) | 1–0 | (Estonia) Levadia |
|---|---|---|
| Tarone 87' (pen.) |

Letzigrund, Zürich
Attendance: 1,100
Referee: Karen Nalbandyan (Armenia)

7 July 2002

| Synot (Czech Republic) | 4–0 | (Sweden) Helsingborg |
|---|---|---|
| Kowalík 3', 78'; Meduna 13'; Činčala 80' |

Stadion Širůch, Staré Město
Attendance: 2,037
Referee: Miroslaw Ryszka (Poland)

6 July 2002

| Gloria Bistrița (Romania) | 3–0 | (Albania) Teuta |
|---|---|---|
| Coroian 6', 75' (pen.); Bârsan 36' |

Stadionul Gloria, Bistrița
Attendance: 800
Referee: Haim Yaakov (Israel)

6 July 2002

| Ashdod (Israel) | 1–1 | (Bulgaria) Marek |
|---|---|---|
| Azran 43' | | Yonkov 72' |

Mestský štadión, Dunajská Streda
Attendance: 100
Referee: Vladimir Antonov (Moldova)

=== Second leg ===
14 July 2002

| Belenenses (Portugal) | 0–1 | (Croatia) Slaven Belupo |
|---|---|---|
| | | Dodik 54' |

Estádio do Restelo, Lisbon
Attendance: 2,700
Referee: Hubert Byrne (Republic of Ireland)

Slaven Belupo won 3–0 on aggregate.

13 July 2002

| Troyes (France) | 2–1 | (Northern Ireland) Coleraine |
|---|---|---|
| Goussé 72'; Ghazi 74' | | Tolan 66' |

Stade de l'Aube, Troyes
Attendance: 1,896
Referee: Yuri Klyuchnikov (Russia)

Troyes won 4–2 on aggregate.

14 July 2002

| BATE Borisov (Belarus) | 4–0 | (Germany) 1860 Munich |
|---|---|---|
| Molosh 16'; Mironchik 35'; Shmigero 66'; Strakhanovich 80' |

Haradski Stadium, Barysaw
Attendance: 4,400
Referee: David Malcolm (Northern Ireland)

BATE Borisov won 5–0 on aggregate.

13 July 2002

| FH (Iceland) | 2–2 | (Spain) Villarreal |
|---|---|---|
| Hallfreðsson 14'; Bett 67' | | López 30'; Gâlcă 88' |

Kaplakriki, Hafnarfjörður
Attendance: 500
Referee: Gerald Lehner (Austria)

Villarreal won 4–2 on aggregate.

14 July 2002

| Haka (Finland) | 1–1 | (England) Fulham |
|---|---|---|
| Ristilä 66' | | Marlet 47' |

Tehtaan kenttä, Valkeakoski
Attendance: 3,500
Referee: Emil Laursen (Denmark)

1–1 on aggregate, Fulham won on away goals rule.

14 July 2002

| Žalgiris (Lithuania) | 1–2 | (France) Sochaux |
|---|---|---|
| A. Steško 46' | | Monsoreau 24'; Mathieu 66' |

Žalgiris Stadium, Vilnius
Attendance: 1,000
Referee: Goran Marić (Croatia)

Sochaux won 4–1 on aggregate.

13 July 2002

| St Patrick's Athletic (Republic of Ireland) | 3–1 | (Belgium) Gent |
|---|---|---|
| McCarthy 49'; Mbabazi 60'; Osam 90' | | Hosny 78' |

Richmond Park, Dublin
Attendance: 2,400
Referee: Jozef Kačenga (Slovakia)

3–3 on aggregate, Gent won on away goals rule.

13 July 2002

| Lokeren (Belgium) | 0–1 | (Germany) Stuttgart |
|---|---|---|
| | | Hleb 90' |

Daknamstadion, Lokeren
Attendance: 2,500
Referee: Zsolt Szabó (Hungary)

Stuttgart won 3–0 on aggregate.

13 July 2002

| Bregenz (Austria) | 1–1 | (Italy) Torino |
|---|---|---|
| Klausz 6' | | Lucarelli 47' |

Casino Stadium, Bregenz
Attendance: 7,100
Referee: Igor Ishchenko (Ukraine)

Torino won 2–1 on aggregate.

13 July 2002

| Dinaburg (Latvia) | 0–1 | (Russia) Krylia Sovetov |
|---|---|---|
| | | Bobyor 23' |

Celtnieks Stadium, Daugavpils
Attendance: 2,158
Referee: Gylfi Thór Orrason (Iceland)

Krylia Sovetov won 4–0 on aggregate.

13 July 2002

| Santa Clara (Portugal) | 1–4 | (Czech Republic) Teplice |
|---|---|---|
| João Pedro 48' | | Zelenka 30'; Doležal 33'; Horváth 72' (pen.); Ryška 81' |

Estádio de São Miguel, Ponta Delgada
Attendance: 722
Referee: Ben Haverkort (Netherlands)

Teplice won 9–2 on aggregate.

13 July 2002

| St. Gallen (Switzerland) | 1–1 (a.e.t.) | (Netherlands) Willem II |
|---|---|---|
| Nixon 90+' | | Meriana 112' |

Espenmoos, St. Gallen
Attendance: 2,400
Referee: Martin Hansson (Sweden)

Willem II won 2–1 on aggregate.

13 July 2002

| Levadia (Estonia) | 0–0 | (Switzerland) Zürich |

Kadriorg Stadium, Tallinn
Attendance: 820
Referee: Drago Kos (Slovenia)

Zürich won 1–0 on aggregate.

14 July 2002

| Helsingborg (Sweden) | 2–0 | (Czech Republic) Synot |
|---|---|---|
| Dahl 45+'; Järdler 66' |

Olympia, Helsingborg
Attendance: 997
Referee: Sten Kaldma (Estonia)

Synot won 4–2 on aggregate.

13 July 2002

| Teuta (Albania) | 1–0 | (Romania) Gloria Bistrița |
|---|---|---|
| Begeja 48' |

Qemal Stafa Stadium, Tirana
Attendance: 2,000
Referee: Zbigniew Marczyk (Poland)

Gloria Bistrița won 3–1 on aggregate.

13 July 2002

| Marek (Bulgaria) | 1–0 | (Israel) Ashdod |
|---|---|---|
| Shankulov 10' |

Bonchuk Stadium, Dupnitsa
Attendance: 1,000
Referee: Muhittin Bosat (Turkey)

Marek won 2–1 on aggregate.

== Third round ==
| Team 1 | Agg. | Team 2 | 1st leg | 2nd leg |
|---|---|---|---|---|
| Krylia Sovetov (Russia) | 3–3(a) | (Netherlands) Willem II | 3–1 | 0–2 |
| NAC (Netherlands) | 1–1(a) | (France) Troyes | 1–1 | 0–0 |
| Stuttgart (Germany) | 4–3 | (Italy) Perugia | 3–1 | 1–2 |
| Fulham (England) | 2–1 | (Greece) Egaleo | 1–0 | 1–1 |
| Gloria Bistrița (Romania) | 0–3 | (France) Lille | 0–2 | 0–1 |
| Kaiserslautern (Germany) | 2–5 | (Czech Republic) Teplice | 2–1 | 0–4 |
| Bologna (Italy) | 2–0 | (Belarus) BATE Borisov | 2–0 | 0–0 |
| Málaga (Spain) | 4–1 | (Belgium) Gent | 3–0 | 1–1 |
| Marek (Bulgaria) | 1–6 | (Croatia) Slaven Belupo | 0–3 | 1–3 |
| Synot (Czech Republic) | 0–3 | (France) Sochaux | 0–3 | 0–0 |
| Torino (Italy) | 2–2 (3–4 p) | (Spain) Villarreal | 2–0 | 0–2 |
| Zürich (Switzerland) | 2–3 | (England) Aston Villa | 2–0 | 0–3 |

=== First leg ===
21 July 2002

| Krylia Sovetov (Russia) | 3–1 | (Netherlands) Willem II |
|---|---|---|
| Kowba 31'; Radimov 44'; Gaúcho 69' | | Landzaat 36' (pen.) |

Metallurg Stadium, Samara
Attendance: 23,000
Referee: Johan Verbist (Belgium)

20 July 2002

| NAC (Netherlands) | 1–1 | (France) Troyes |
|---|---|---|
| Slot 73' | | Danjou 51' |

FUJIFILM Stadion, Breda
Attendance: 5,434
Referee: Markus Nobs (Switzerland)

20 July 2002

| Stuttgart (Germany) | 3–1 | (Italy) Perugia |
|---|---|---|
| Bordon 66'; Ganea 71'; Seitz 90' | | Miccoli 14' |

Gottlieb-Daimler-Stadion, Stuttgart
Attendance: 7,000
Referee: Rob Styles (England)

20 July 2002

| Fulham (England) | 1–0 | (Greece) Egaleo |
|---|---|---|
| Saha 77' |

Craven Cottage, London
Attendance: 5,199
Referee: Johny Ver Eecke (Belgium)

20 July 2002

| Gloria Bistrița (Romania) | 0–2 | (France) Lille |
|---|---|---|
| | | Boutoille 63'; Brunel 85' |

Stadionul Gloria, Bistrița
Attendance: 10,000
Referee: Petteri Kari (Finland)

21 July 2002

| Kaiserslautern (Germany) | 2–1 | (Czech Republic) Teplice |
|---|---|---|
| Basler 14', 38' | | Horváth 89' (pen.) |

Fritz-Walter-Stadion, Kaiserslautern
Attendance: 15,000
Referee: John R. Underhill (Scotland)

20 July 2002

| Bologna (Italy) | 2–0 | (Belarus) BATE Borisov |
|---|---|---|
| Cruz 28'; Bellucci 79' |

Stadio Renato Dall'Ara, Bologna
Attendance: 13,700
Referee: Athanassios Briakos (Greece)

20 July 2002

| Málaga (Spain) | 3–0 | (Belgium) Gent |
|---|---|---|
| Dely Valdés 18', 81'; Canabal 32' |

La Rosaleda Stadium, Málaga
Attendance: 10,000
Referee: Bertrand Layec (France)

20 July 2002

| Marek (Bulgaria) | 0–3 | (Croatia) Slaven Belupo |
|---|---|---|
| | | Crnac 21'; Kosić 75'; Božac 90' |

Bonchuk Stadium, Dupnitsa
Attendance: 4,000
Referee: Damien Ledentu (France)

21 July 2002

| Synot (Czech Republic) | 0–3 | (France) Sochaux |
|---|---|---|
| | | Frau 21', 50'; Lonfat 83' |

Stadion Širůch, Staré Město
Attendance: 2,100
Referee: Sergey Shmolik (Belarus)

21 July 2002

| Torino (Italy) | 2–0 | (Spain) Villarreal |
|---|---|---|
| Comotto 44'; Ferrante 48' |

Stadio delle Alpi, Turin
Attendance: 14,353
Referee: Michael Weiner (Germany)

20 July 2002

| Zürich (Switzerland) | 2–0 | (England) Aston Villa |
|---|---|---|
| Keita 32'; Yasar 83' |

Hardturm, Zürich
Attendance: 4,560
Referee: Florian Meyer (Germany)

=== Second leg ===
27 July 2002

| Willem II (Netherlands) | 2–0 | (Russia) Krylia Sovetov |
|---|---|---|
| Janssens 37'; Sektioui 83' |

Koning Willem II Stadion, Tilburg
Attendance: 3,500
Referee: Kjell Alseth (Norway)

3–3 on aggregate, Willem II won on away goals rule.

27 July 2002

| Troyes (France) | 0–0 | (Netherlands) NAC |

Stade de l'Aube, Troyes
Attendance: 4,000
Referee: Alan Freeland (Scotland)

1–1 on aggregate, Troyes won on away goals rule.

27 July 2002

| Perugia (Italy) | 2–1 | (Germany) Stuttgart |
|---|---|---|
| Miccoli 73'; Berrettoni 90' | | Ganea 52' |

Stadio Druso, Bolzano
Attendance: 3,000
Referee: Alfonso Pérez Burrull (Spain)

Stuttgart won 4–3 on aggregate.

27 June 2002

| Egaleo (Greece) | 1–1 | (England) Fulham |
|---|---|---|
| Chloros 24' | | Marlet 34' |

Leoforos Alexandras Stadium, Athens
Attendance: 1,412
Referee: Ruud Bossen (Netherlands)

Fulham won 2–1 on aggregate.

27 July 2002

| Lille (France) | 1–0 | (Romania) Gloria Bistrița |
|---|---|---|
| D'Amico 50' |

Stade Grimonprez-Jooris, Lille
Attendance: 9,906
Referee: Miroslav Radoman (FR Yugoslavia)

Lille won 3–0 on aggregate.

27 July 2002

| Teplice (Czech Republic) | 4–0 | (Germany) Kaiserslautern |
|---|---|---|
| Horváth 48'; Voříšek 65'; Zelenka 86'; Verbíř 90' |

Na Stínadlech, Teplice
Attendance: 10,128
Referee: Stefano Farina (Italy)

Teplice won 5–2 on aggregate.

27 July 2002

| BATE Borisov (Belarus) | 0–0 | (Italy) Bologna |

Haradski Stadium, Barysaw
Attendance: 4,200
Referee: Luis Medina Cantalejo (Spain)

Bologna won 2–0 on aggregate.

27 July 2002

| Gent (Belgium) | 1–1 | (Spain) Málaga |
|---|---|---|
| Kaklamanos 41' | | Dely Valdés 90+' |

Jules Ottenstadion, Ghent
Attendance: 5,000
Referee: Wolfgang Sowa (Austria)

Málaga won 4–1 on aggregate.

27 July 2002

| Slaven Belupo (Croatia) | 3–1 | (Bulgaria) Marek |
|---|---|---|
| Kovačić 27', 66'; Božac 87' | | Dimitrov 32' (pen.) |

Gradski stadion, Koprivnica
Attendance: 3,000
Referee: Tonny Poulsen (Denmark)

Slaven Belupo won 6–1 on aggregate.

27 July 2002

| Sochaux (France) | 0–0 | (Czech Republic) Synot |

Stade Auguste Bonal, Montbéliard
Attendance: 8,843
Referee: Uriah Rennie (England)

Sochaux won 3–0 on aggregate.

27 July 2002

| Villarreal (Spain) | 2–0 (a.e.t.) | (Italy) Torino |
|---|---|---|
| Guayre 46'; Arruabarrena 61' |
Penalties
| Gâlcă (penalty missed); Belletti (penalty scored); Palermo (penalty scored); López (penalty scored); Aranda (penalty scored) | 4–3 | (penalty missed) Ferrante; (penalty scored) Mezzano; (penalty scored) Castellini; (penalty missed) Delli Carri; (penalty scored) Sommese |

Estadio El Madrigal, Villarreal
Attendance: 11,000
Referee: António Manuel Almeida Costa (Portugal)

2–2 aggregate. Villarreal won on penalties.

27 July 2002

| Aston Villa (England) | 3–0 | (Switzerland) Zürich |
|---|---|---|
| Boulding 33'; Allbäck 52'; Staunton 77' |

Villa Park, Birmingham
Attendance: 18,349
Referee: Roberto Rosetti (Italy)

Aston Villa won 3–2 on aggregate.

== Semi-finals ==
| Team 1 | Agg. | Team 2 | 1st leg | 2nd leg |
|---|---|---|---|---|
| Fulham (England) | 3–0 | (France) Sochaux | 1–0 | 2–0 |
| Lille (France) | 3–1 | (England) Aston Villa | 1–1 | 2–0 |
| Stuttgart (Germany) | 3–1 | (Croatia) Slaven Belupo | 2–1 | 1–0 |
| Villarreal (Spain) | 3–0 | (France) Troyes | 0–0 | 3–0 |
| Málaga (Spain) | 3–1 | (Netherlands) Willem II | 2–1 | 1–0 |
| Bologna (Italy) | 8–2 | (Czech Republic) Teplice | 5–1 | 3–1 |

=== First leg ===
31 July 2002
19:30

| Lille (France) | 1–1 | (England) Aston Villa |
|---|---|---|
| D'Amico 90+' | Report | Taylor 76' |

Stade Grimonprez-Jooris, Lille
Attendance: 14,437
Referee: Željko Širić (Croatia)

31 July 2002
20:00

| Stuttgart (Germany) | 2–1 | (Croatia) Slaven Belupo |
|---|---|---|
| Schneider 9', 62' | Report | Bajsić 84' |

Gottlieb-Daimler-Stadion, Stuttgart
Attendance: 5,120
Referee: Paulo Paraty (Portugal)

31 July 2002
20:30

| Bologna (Italy) | 5–1 | (Czech Republic) Teplice |
|---|---|---|
| Nervo 3'; Signori 32', 36' (pen.); Zaccardo 68'; Olive 77' | Report | Zelenka 65' |

Stadio Renato Dall'Ara, Bologna
Attendance: 15,174
Referee: Dani Koren (Israel)

31 July 2002
20:45

| Fulham (England) | 1–0 | (France) Sochaux |
|---|---|---|
| Davis 90' | Report |

Craven Cottage, London
Attendance: 4,717
Referee: Sorin Corpodean (Romania)

31 July 2002
21:30

| Villarreal (Spain) | 0–0 | (France) Troyes |
|---|---|---|
| | Report |

Estadio El Madrigal, Villarreal
Attendance: 7,000
Referee: Erol Ersoy (Turkey)

31 July 2002
21:30

| Málaga (Spain) | 2–1 | (Netherlands) Willem II |
|---|---|---|
| Koke 34'; Dely Valdés 64' (pen.) | Report | Jaliens 61' |

La Rosaleda Stadium, Málaga
Attendance: 12,000
Referee: Ivan Dobrinov (Bulgaria)

=== Second leg ===
7 August 2002
17:00

| Slaven Belupo (Croatia) | 0–1 | (Germany) Stuttgart |
|---|---|---|
| | Report | Dundee 39' |

Gradski stadion, Koprivnica
Attendance: 3,500
Referee: Vladimír Hriňák (Slovakia)

Stuttgart won 3–1 on aggregate.

7 August 2002
17:30

| Teplice (Czech Republic) | 1–3 | (Italy) Bologna |
|---|---|---|
| Grlić 90' | Report | Nervo 15'; Colucci 19', 38' |

Na Stínadlech, Teplice
Attendance: 2,700
Referee: Tom Henning Øvrebø (Norway)

Bologna won 8–2 on aggregate.

7 August 2002
19:00

| Troyes (France) | 0–3 | (Spain) Villarreal |
|---|---|---|
| Berthé 41'; Goussé 52' (pen.) | Report | Calleja 14' |

Stade de l'Aube, Troyes
Attendance: 6,500
Referee: Fritz Stuchlik (Austria)

The game was awarded 3–0 to Villarreal due to Troyes fielding an ineligible player David Vairelles. Villarreal won 3–0 on aggregate.

7 August 2002
19:30

| Sochaux (France) | 0–2 | (England) Fulham |
|---|---|---|
| | Report | Legwinski 63'; Hayles 77' |

Stade Auguste Bonal, Montbéliard
Attendance: 11,000
Referee: Franz-Xaver Wack (Germany)

Fulham won 3–0 on aggregate.

7 August 2002
20:00

| Willem II (Netherlands) | 0–1 | (Spain) Málaga |
|---|---|---|
| | Report | Dely Valdés 66' |

Koning Willem II Stadion, Tilburg
Attendance: 8,000
Referee: Mike McCurry (Scotland)

Málaga won 3–1 on aggregate.

7 August 2002
20:45

| Aston Villa (England) | 0–2 | (France) Lille |
|---|---|---|
| | Report | Fahmi 45'; Bonnal 47' |

Villa Park, Birmingham
Attendance: 26,192
Referee: Paulo Costa (Portugal)

Lille won 3–1 on aggregate.

== Finals ==
| Team 1 | Agg. | Team 2 | 1st leg | 2nd leg |
|---|---|---|---|---|
| Villarreal (Spain) | 1–2 | (Spain) Málaga | 0–1 | 1–1 |
| Bologna (Italy) | 3–5 | (England) Fulham | 2–2 | 1–3 |
| Lille (France) | 1–2 | (Germany) Stuttgart | 1–0 | 0–2 |

=== First leg ===
13 August 2002
19:30

| Lille (France) | 1–0 | (Germany) Stuttgart |
|---|---|---|
| Bonnal 20' | Report |

Stade Grimonprez-Jooris, Lille
Attendance: 10,695
Referee: Jacek Granat (Poland)

13 August 2002
20:30

| Bologna (Italy) | 2–2 | (England) Fulham |
|---|---|---|
| Signori 53' (pen.), 76' (pen.) | Report | Inamoto 63'; Legwinski 87' |

Stadio Renato Dall'Ara, Bologna
Attendance: 23,000
Referee: Eduardo Iturralde González (Spain)

13 August 2002
21:30

| Villarreal (Spain) | 0–1 | (Spain) Málaga |
|---|---|---|
| | Report | García León 8' |

Estadio El Madrigal, Villarreal
Attendance: 16,000
Referee: Michael Riley (England)

=== Second leg ===
27 August 2002
18:00

| Stuttgart (Germany) | 2–0 | (France) Lille |
|---|---|---|
| Balakov 81'; Cheyrou 88' (o.g.) | Report |

Gottlieb-Daimler-Stadion, Stuttgart
Attendance: 16,000
Referee: Jacek Granat (Poland)

Stuttgart won 2–1 on aggregate.

27 August 2002
20:30

| Fulham (England) | 3–1 | (Italy) Bologna |
|---|---|---|
| Inamoto 12', 47', 50' | Report | Locatelli 34' |

Loftus Road, London
Attendance: 13,756
Referee: Massimo Busacca (Switzerland)

Fulham won 5–3 on aggregate.

27 August 2002
21:30

| Málaga (Spain) | 1–1 | (Spain) Villarreal |
|---|---|---|
| Roteta 32' | Report | Aranda 65' |

La Rosaleda Stadium, Málaga
Attendance: 19,000
Referee: Helmut Fleischer (Germany)

Málaga won 2–1 on aggregate.

== See also ==
- 2002–03 UEFA Champions League
- 2002–03 UEFA Cup
