= St Patrick's Athletic F.C. in European football =

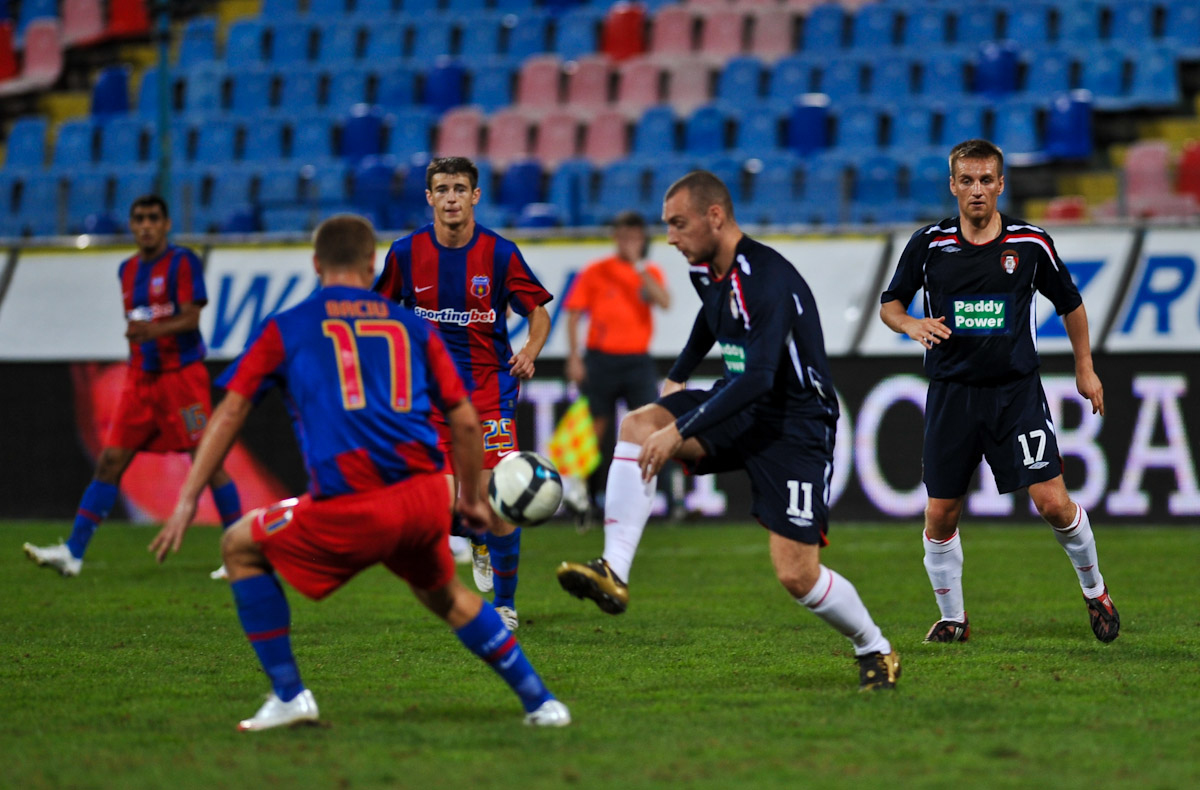
- St Patrick's Athletic away to Steaua București in the 2009–10 UEFA Europa League Play-off Round
- Club: St Patrick's Athletic F.C.
- Most appearances: Chris Forrester (29) (Note: as of match played 14 August 2025)
- Top scorer: Christy Fagan (6)
- First entry: 1961–62 European Cup Winners' Cup
- Latest entry: 2025–26 UEFA Conference League

St Patrick's Athletic Football Club is a professional association football club based in Inchicore, Dublin, Ireland that competes in the League of Ireland Premier Division, the top tier of football in the Republic of Ireland.

== Overall record ==
=== Senior ===
As of match played on 14 August 2025

Competition	P	W	D	L	GF	GA
European Cup / UEFA Champions League	8	0	3	5	2	23
Inter-Cities Fairs Cup / UEFA Cup / UEFA Europa League	42	10	7	25	39	70
UEFA Europa Conference League / UEFA Conference League	18	7	5	6	21	22
European Cup Winners' Cup	2	0	0	2	1	8
UEFA Intertoto Cup	4	2	0	2	6	6
TOTAL	74	19	15	40	69	129

=== Academy ===
As of match played on 4 November 2026

Competition	P	W	D	L	GF	GA
UEFA Youth League	4	1	1	2	3	5
TOTAL	4	1	1	2	3	5

== Best campaigns ==
Season	Achievement	Notes
European Cup / UEFA Champions League
2014–15	2nd Qualifying Round	eliminated by Legia Warsaw 1–1 in Warsaw, 0–5 in Dublin
Inter-Cities Fairs Cup / UEFA Cup / UEFA Europa League
2008–09	First Round	eliminated by Hertha BSC 0–2 in Berlin, 0–0 in Dublin
2009–10	Play-off Round	eliminated by Steaua București 0–3 in Bucharest, 1–2 in Dublin
UEFA Europa Conference League / UEFA Conference League
2024–25	Play-off Round	eliminated by İstanbul Başakşehir 0–0 in Dublin, 0–2 in Istanbul
European Cup Winners' Cup
1961–62	Preliminary Round	eliminated by Dunfermline Athletic 1–4 in Dunfermline, 0–4 in Dublin
UEFA Intertoto Cup
2002	Second Round	eliminated by KAA Gent 0–2 in Ghent, 3–1 in Dublin (lost 0–1 on away goals)

== European Cup / UEFA Champions League ==
Season	Round	Opposing team	Home	Away	Aggregate	Reference
1990–91	First Round	(Romania) Dinamo București	1–1	0–4	1–5	
1998–99	First Qualifying Round	(Scotland) Celtic	0–2	0–0	0–2	
1999–00	First Qualifying Round	(Moldova) Zimbru Chișinău	0–5	0–5	0–10	
2014–15	First Qualifying Round	(Poland) Legia Warsaw	0–5	1–1	1–6	

== Inter-Cities Fairs Cup / UEFA Cup / UEFA Europa League ==
Season	Round	Opposing team	Home	Away	Aggregate	Reference
1967–68	First Round	(France) Girondins de Bordeaux	1–3	3–6	4–9	
1988–89	First Round	(Scotland) Heart of Midlothian	0–2	0–2	0–4	
1996–97	Preliminary Round	(Slovakia) Slovan Bratislava	3–4	0–1	3–5	
2007–08	First Qualifying Round	(Denmark) Odense	0–0	0–5	0–5	
2008–09	First Qualifying Round	(Latvia) JFK Olimps	2–0	1–5	3–0	
2008–09	Second Qualifying Round	(Sweden) Elfsborg	2–1	2–2	4–3	
2008–09	First Round	(Germany) Hertha BSC	0–0	0–2	0–2	
2009–10	Second Qualifying Round	(Malta) Valletta	1–1	1–0	2–1	
2009–10	Third Qualifying Round	(Russia) Krylia Sovetov	1–0	2–3	3–3 (a)	
2009–10	Play-off Round	(Romania) Steaua București	1–2	0–3	1–5	
2011–12	First Qualifying Round	(Iceland) ÍBV	2–0	0–1	2–1	
2011–12	Second Qualifying Round	(Kazakhstan) Shakhter Karagandy	2–0	1–2	3–2	
2011–12	Third Qualifying Round	(Ukraine) Karpaty Lviv	1–3	0–2	1–5	
2012–13	First Qualifying Round	(Iceland) ÍBV	1–0	1–2 (a.e.t.)	2–2 (a)	
2012–13	Second Qualifying Round	(Bosnia and Herzegovina) Široki Brijeg	2–1 (a.e.t.)	1–1	3–2	
2012–13	Third Qualifying Round	(Germany) Hannover 96	0–3	0–2	0–5	
2013–14	First Qualifying Round	(Lithuania) Žalgiris	1–2	2–2	3–4	
2015–16	First Qualifying Round	(Latvia) Skonto	0–2	1–2	1–4	
2016–17	First Qualifying Round	(Luxembourg) Jeunesse Esch	1–0	1–2 (a.e.t.)	2–2 (a)	
2016–17	Second Qualifying Round	(Belarus) Dinamo Minsk	0–1	1–1	1–2	
2019–20	First Qualifying Round	(Sweden) Norrköping	0–2	1–2	1–4	

== UEFA Europa Conference League / UEFA Conference League ==
Season	Round	Opposing team	Home	Away	Aggregate	Reference
2022–23	Second Qualifying Round	(Slovenia) Mura	1–1	0–0 (a.e.t.)	1–1 (6–5 p)	
2022–23	Third Qualifying Round	(Bulgaria) CSKA Sofia	0–2	1–0	1–2	
2023–24	First Qualifying Round	(Luxembourg) F91 Dudelange	2–3	1–2	3–5	
2024–25	Second Qualifying Round	(Liechtenstein) Vaduz	3–1	2–2	5–3	
2024–25	Third Qualifying Round	(Azerbaijan) Sabah	1–0	1–0	2–0	
2024–25	Play-off Round	(Turkey) İstanbul Başakşehir	0–0	0–2	0–2	
2025–26	First Qualifying Round	(Lithuania) Hegelmann	1–0	2–0	3–0	
2025–26	Second Qualifying Round	(Estonia) Nõmme Kalju	1–0	2–2 (a.e.t.)	3–2	
2025–26	Third Qualifying Round	(Turkey) Beşiktaş	1–4	2–3	3–7	

== European Cup Winners' Cup ==
Season	Round	Opposing team	Home	Away	Agg.	Reference
1961–62	Preliminary Round	(Scotland) Dunfermline Athletic	0–4	1–4	1–8	

== UEFA Intertoto Cup ==
Season	Round	Opposing team	Home	Away	Agg.	Reference
2002	First Round	(Croatia) Rijeka	1–0	2–3	3–3 (a)	
2002	Second Round	(Belgium) KAA Gent	3–1	0–2	3–3 (a)	

== UEFA Youth League ==
Season	Round	Opposing team	Home	Away	Agg.	Reference
2021–22	First Round	(Serbia) Red Star Belgrade	1–2	0–2	1–4	
2026–27	First Round	(Lithuania) Žalgiris	1–1	1–0	2–1	
2026–27	Second Round	(Estonia) Flora				

== Statistics by club/country ==
Senior stats only. Accurate as of match played on 14 August 2025

Country	Club	Pld	W	D	L	GF	GA	GD
Azerbaijan	Sabah	2	2	0	0	2	0	+2
Subtotal		2	2	0	0	2	0	+2
Belarus	FC Dinamo Minsk	2	0	1	1	1	2	-1
Subtotal		2	0	1	1	1	2	-1
Belgium	KAA Gent	2	1	0	1	3	3	0
Subtotal		2	1	0	1	3	3	0
Bosnia and Herzegovina	Široki Brijeg	2	1	1	0	3	2	+1
Subtotal		2	1	1	0	3	2	+1
Bulgaria	CSKA Sofia	2	1	0	1	1	2	-1
Subtotal		2	1	0	1	1	2	-1
Croatia	Rijeka	2	1	0	1	3	3	0
Subtotal		2	1	0	1	3	3	0
Denmark	Odense	2	0	1	1	0	5	-5
Subtotal		2	0	1	1	0	5	-5
Estonia	Nõmme Kalju	2	1	1	0	3	2	+1
Subtotal		2	1	1	0	3	2	+1
France	Girondins de Bordeaux	2	0	0	2	4	9	-5
Subtotal		2	0	0	2	4	9	-5
Germany	Hannover 96	2	0	0	2	0	5	-5
Germany	Hertha BSC	2	0	1	1	0	2	-2
Subtotal		4	0	1	3	0	5	-7
Kazakhstan	Shakhter Karagandy	2	1	0	1	3	2	+1
Subtotal		2	1	0	1	3	2	+1
Latvia	JFK Olimps	2	2	0	0	3	0	+3
Latvia	Skonto	2	0	0	2	1	3	-2
Subtotal		4	2	0	2	4	3	+1
Liechtenstein	Vaduz	2	1	1	0	5	3	+2
Subtotal		2	1	1	0	5	3	+2
Lithuania	Hegelmann	2	2	0	0	3	0	+3
Lithuania	Žalgiris	2	0	1	1	3	4	-1
Subtotal		4	2	1	1	6	4	+2
Luxembourg	F91 Dudelange	2	0	0	2	3	5	-2
Luxembourg	Jeunesse Esch	2	1	0	1	2	2	0
Subtotal		4	1	0	3	5	7	-2
Malta	Valletta	2	1	1	0	2	1	+1
Subtotal		2	1	1	0	2	1	+1
Moldova	Zimbru Chișinău	2	0	0	2	0	10	-10
Subtotal		2	0	0	2	0	10	-10
Iceland	ÍBV	4	2	0	2	4	3	+1
Subtotal		4	2	0	2	4	3	+1
Poland	Legia Warsaw	2	0	1	1	1	6	-5
Subtotal		2	0	1	1	1	6	-5
Romania	Dinamo București	2	0	1	1	1	5	-4
Romania	Steaua București	2	0	0	2	1	5	–4
Subtotal		4	0	1	3	2	10	–8
Russia	Krylia Sovetov	2	1	0	1	3	3	0
Subtotal		2	1	0	1	3	3	0
Scotland	Celtic	2	0	1	1	0	2	-2
Scotland	Dunfermline Athletic	2	0	0	2	1	8	-7
Scotland	Heart of Midlothian	2	0	0	2	0	4	–4
Subtotal		6	0	1	5	1	14	–13
Slovakia	Slivan Bratislava	2	0	0	2	3	6	-3
Subtotal		2	0	0	2	3	6	-3
Slovenia	Mura	2	0	2	0	1	1	0
Subtotal		2	0	2	0	1	1	0
Sweden	Elfsborg	2	1	1	0	4	3	+1
Sweden	Norrköping	2	0	0	2	1	4	-3
Subtotal		4	1	1	2	5	7	-2
Turkey	Beşiktaş	2	0	0	2	3	7	-4
Turkey	Istanbul Başakşehir	2	0	1	1	0	2	-2
Subtotal		4	0	1	3	3	9	-6
Ukraine	Karpaty Lviv	2	0	0	2	1	5	-4
Subtotal		2	0	0	2	1	5	-4
Total		74	19	15	40	69	129	–60

== Player and manager statistics ==
Senior stats only. Accurate as of match played on 14 August 2025

Top-scoring players in European competitions

Player	Country	Goals	Apps	Ratio
Christy Fagan	Ireland	6	15	0.4
Declan O'Brien	Ireland	4	6	0.67
Jake Mulraney	Ireland	3	14	0.21
Noel Campbell	Ireland	2	2	1
Charles Livingstone Mbabazi	Uganda	2	4	0.5
Romal Palmer	England	2	5	0.4
Evan McMillan	Ireland	2	6	0.33
Derek Doyle	Ireland	2	6	0.33
Zack Elbouzedi	Ireland	2	9	0.22
Mark Quigley	Ireland	2	10	0.2
Paul Osam	Ireland	2	10	0.2
Joe Redmond	Ireland	2	16	0.13
Chris Forrester	Ireland	2	29	0.07

Players with most European appearances

Player	Country	Apps
Chris Forrester	Ireland	29
Ian Bermingham	Ireland	24
Jamie Lennon	Ireland	18
Brendan Clarke	Ireland	18
Joe Redmond	Ireland	16
Joseph Anang	Ghana	16
Tom Grivosti	England	16
Ger O'Brien	Ireland	16
Christy Fagan	Ireland	15
Anthony Breslin	Ireland	14
Jake Mulraney	Ireland	14
Ryan Guy	Guam	14
Kian Leavy	Ireland	12
Jason McClelland	Ireland	12
Mason Melia	Ireland	12
Gary Rogers	Ireland	12

Managers with most European games managed

Player	Country	Games
Liam Buckley	Ireland	18
Stephen Kenny	Ireland	12
Johnny McDonnell	Ireland	8
Pat Dolan	Ireland	8
Pete Mahon	Ireland	6
Jeff Kenna	Ireland	6
Tim Clancy	Ireland	4
Brian Kerr	Ireland	4
Jon Daly	Ireland	2
Harry Kenny	Ireland	2
Peter Farrell	Ireland	2
Jimmy Collins	Ireland	2
