= Paul Osam =

Irish footballer

Personal information
- Date of birth: 20 December 1967 (age 58)
- Place of birth: Dublin, Ireland
- Positions: Midfielder; defender; winger

Youth career
- Leicester Celtic
- Stella Maris
- St Joseph’s Boys
- Bushy Park Rangers
- –1986: Broadford Rovers

Senior career*
Years	Team	Apps	(Gls)
1986–1988	Mount Merrion		
1988–1993	St Patrick's Athletic	91	(10)
1993–1994	Shamrock Rovers	18	(1)
1995–2004	St Patrick's Athletic	231	(29)
Total		340	(40)

Managerial career
- 2025–2026: Republic of Ireland u17
- * Club domestic league appearances and goals

Paul Osam (born 20 December 1967) is an Irish former professional association footballer. He has also done media work with TV3.

== Early life ==
Paul Osam was born in Dublin to an Irish mother and a Ghanaian father. Paul, along with his three brothers and his sister, was brought up in the working class estate formerly known as Holylands on Dublin’s southside.

Osam began his football life in the schoolboy leagues with local side Leicester Celtic. He later had spells at Stella Maris, St Joseph’s Boys and Bushy Park Rangers. After a two-and-a-half year absence from club football, where Osam played with his school team at Balinteer Community School, he joined Broadford Rovers Under-18s. When he graduated from their underage team he joined Mount Merrion F.C.

== Career ==
Osam was born in Dublin, Ireland. He started his League of Ireland career in 1988 when he was signed by Brian Kerr for St Patrick's Athletic from junior side Mount Merrion. He struggled to make an impact during his first season but made his league debut on 3 September 1989 in Limerick after Robbie Gaffney broke his leg. In 1989–90 he was dubbed the "Black Pearl of Inchicore Mark III" (Former St. Pats players and Black Irish pioneers Paul McGrath and Curtis Fleming were I and II respectively). His goal for St Pats away to the then champions Derry City FC is said to have been the turning point of that season and the Saints went on to win their first league title since 1956, with Osam playing an influential role as a left winger despite his six-foot four frame.

After the league win, St. Pats hit serious financial difficulties, struggled in the league and eventually resigned themselves to losing all their star players. Osam stayed longer than most but in 1993, he signed for Dublin rivals Shamrock Rovers. Again his influence was felt immediately and Rovers won their first league in a decade. Towards the end of the season Osam suffered a cruciate knee injury and missed the last eight games. The treatment he received from the board of Shamrock Rovers led to Osam leaving after just one season after two goals in 21 total appearances. (Later Brian Kerr would call this Osam's "year of purgatory".) He was close to signing for Derry City but due to the injury he missed the entire 1994–95 season.

In 1995 Brian Kerr once again signed Osam for St Pats. He played in central midfield and, along with Eddie Gormley and Noel Mernagh, was the driving force behind another league title. With the disruption caused by Brian Kerr leaving to take charge of the Irish underage teams, the 1996–97 was out of reach for St. Pats. However under the management of Pat Dolan and then Liam Buckley, St. Pats won the title again in 1997–98 and 1998–99, meaning Osam had won 5 league titles in 10 years. His performances in 1999–99 saw Osam win the player of the year awards from all awarding bodies, the PFAI (Players vote), the SWAI (journalists vote) and the Football Association of Ireland. He is the only player to have won all 3 awards simultaneously. Such was Osam's popularity that he became the first League of Ireland player to star in a nationwide advertising campaign when he became spokesman for Weight Watchers in Ireland.

After some quiet years for St Pats, Osam captained the side to the League Cup in 2001. Season 2001–02 saw Saints once again finish top of the league. However the club was docked 15 points for fielding an unregistered player, Charles Livingstone Mbabazi. Despite the club's protests that there was no intention to mislead (Mbabazi had already been playing for the Saints for a number of seasons) and a report from the FAI saying that there were numerous other errors in other clubs' players' registrations, the points deduction remained - although league winners' medals were awarded to the players.

The Champions League place was given to Shelbourne FC but St Pat's maintain that they are the sole and rightful league winners in 2002. In April of that year, Osam was awarded a testimonial by St Pats. Former player Paul McGrath played for the first time in years to show the esteem Paul is held with in Irish football. In June 2002 Osam scored at HNK Rijeka in the 2002 UEFA Intertoto Cup.

After Pats progressed on away goals he again netted in the next round in the home tie against K.A.A. Gent.

Under new manager Eamonn Collins, Osam captained St. Pats to win another FAI League Cup in 2003 and they reached the final of the FAI Cup final later that season. However St. Pats lost and the FAI Cup eluded Osam again. When he retired from football in 2004, he had won every honour in Irish football bar the FAI Cup.

Throughout his career, Osam was heavily pushed for inclusion in the Republic of Ireland national football team. However, as neither Jack Charlton nor Mick McCarthy capped any player from the League of Ireland during their tenure, Paul had to contend himself with captaining the League of Ireland XI on many occasions.

After his retirement, St. Pats vowed to keep Osam on the staff and he took a position as manager of the club's Under 21 side. He combined this with his media work for TV3.

In January 2008, he left St. Pats for a coaching role with Bray Wanderers. In 2010, Osam left his role with Bray Wanderers.

In August 2025, the FAI announced that Osam would move from his role as head coach of the Republic of Ireland under-16 team to lead the Republic of Ireland under-17 team.

== Personal life ==
Osam is married and has a son, Evan Osam, who is a former Republic of Ireland youth international and plays for Bray Wanderers. Evan Osam also previously played for Shamrock Rovers, Shelbourne and UCD.
