= Curtis Fleming =

Irish international footballer

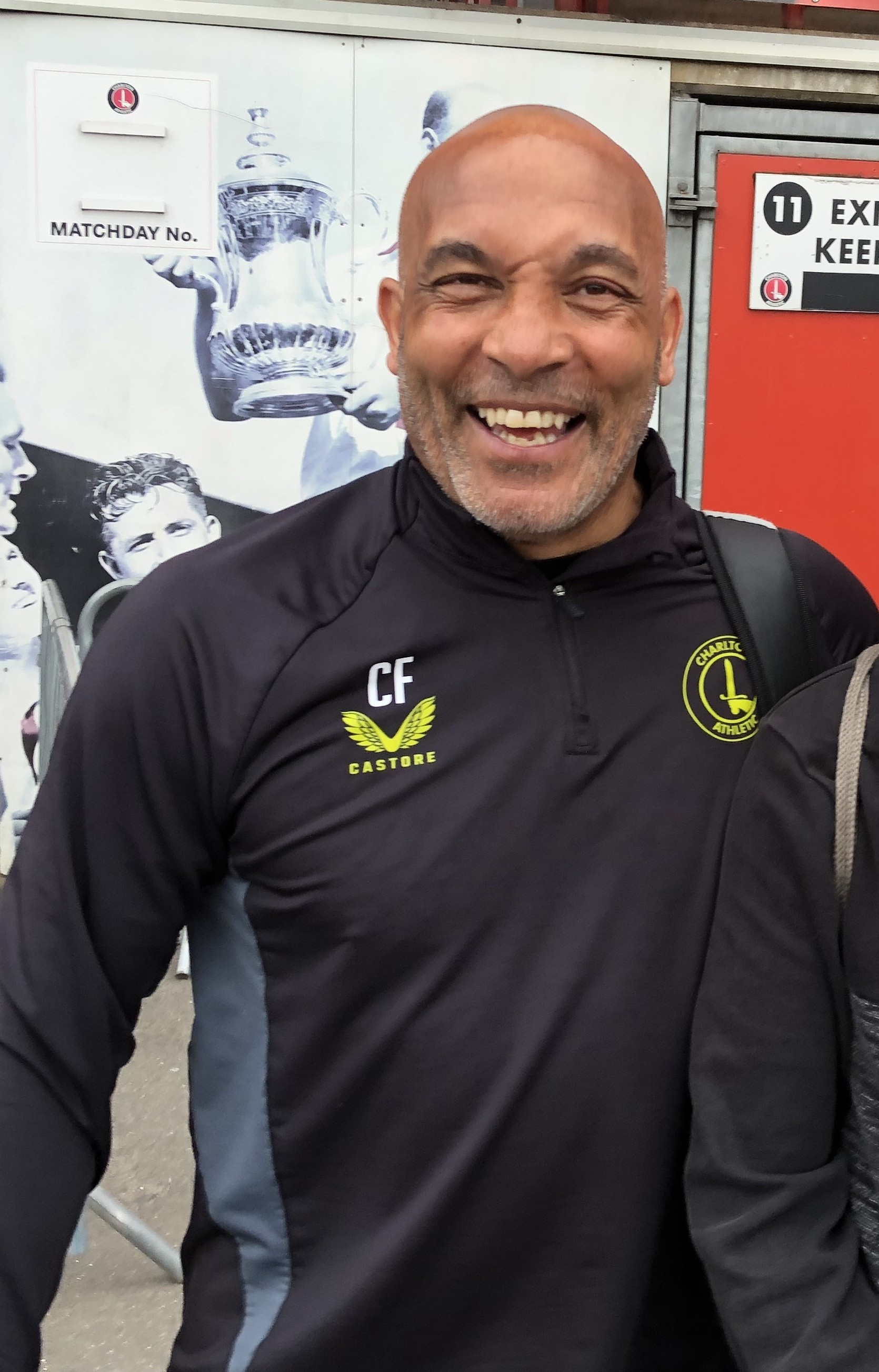
- Fleming in 2025

Personal information
- Date of birth: 8 October 1968 (age 58)
- Place of birth: Manchester, England
- Height: 5 ft 10 in (1.78 m)
- Position: Right-back

Team information
- Current team: Charlton Athletic (assistant manager)

Youth career
- –1987: Belvedere

Senior career*
Years	Team	Apps	(Gls)
1987–1989	St Patrick's Athletic	60	(2)
1989	Swindon Town	0	(0)
1989–1991	St Patrick's Athletic	62	(2)
1991–2001	Middlesbrough	266	(3)
2001	→ Birmingham City (loan)	6	(0)
2001–2004	Crystal Palace	45	(0)
2004–2005	Darlington	27	(0)
2005	Shelbourne	10	(0)
2006–2007	Billingham Synthonia	18	(0)
Total		494	(7)

International career
1989–1990	Republic of Ireland U23	2	(0)
1989–1990	Republic of Ireland U21	5	(0)
1996–1998	Republic of Ireland	10	(0)

Managerial career
- 2012: Crystal Palace (caretaker)
- 2019–2020: Punjab FC II
- 2020–2021: Punjab FC
- 2023: Bristol City (interim)
- 2024: Charlton Athletic (caretaker)
- * Club domestic league appearances and goals

Curtis Fleming (born 8 October 1968) is an Irish professional football manager and former player, who is the assistant manager of EFL Championship club Charlton Athletic.

Fleming played right back and won international honours for the Republic of Ireland at under-21, under-23 (twice), and senior level. He played youth football for Belvedere before starting his senior career with St Patrick's Athletic in the League of Ireland and spent the majority of his career with Middlesbrough.

== Club career ==
=== St Patrick's Athletic ===
Fleming played for the Dublin-based youth club Belvedere, and was signed by Brian Kerr for St. Patrick's Athletic in the summer of 1987. He was one of a number of young players signed as Kerr sought to build a squad that could challenge for honours. In his first season, he ousted former international player Eamonn Gregg from the first eleven and quickly established himself as one of the most exciting talents in the league. He won four caps for the Republic of Ireland under-21 side and was the only home based player when playing for the Republic of Ireland under-23 side against Northern Ireland in 1989. He was transferred to Swindon Town in March 1989 but returned in the summer having not played for the first team. After finishing second in his first season, Fleming won the league with St. Pat's in 1989–90 season and earned the moniker Black Pearl of Inchicore Mark II (See Paul McGrath and Paul Osam). In November 1990 he was awarded the FAI's Under-21 Player of the Year award. He also played in the European Cup and UEFA Cup while at Richmond Park.

=== Middlesbrough ===
Despite signing for Shamrock Rovers Fleming moved to England in the summer of 1991 to join Middlesbrough on a £50,000 transfer. He helped Lennie Lawrence's side gain promotion to the newly formed Premier League in his first season. After being relegated, it took 'Boro' until 1995 to be promoted again, this time with Bryan Robson in charge they won the first division title. As Middlesbrough alternated between the Premier League and First division, Fleming remained a constant in the side and as part of Robson's squad he was on the losing side in the League Cup finals in 1997 and 1998 and the FA Cup final in 1997. On 5 August 2001, Middlesbrough played Athletic Bilbao in a testimonial match for Fleming. He played 266 league games for Middlesbrough before finally moving on.

=== After Middlesbrough ===
Fleming went on loan to Birmingham City in November 2001, playing six games for them. He then completed a move to Crystal Palace at the end of December 2001, for a fee believed to be "in the region of £100,000". Unfortunately for Fleming injuries would curtail his involvement at Palace, although Ian Dowie was impressed enough to make him club captain. After 2 1/2 seasons at Crystal palace, Fleming moved back to North East England in July 2004 to sign for Darlington on a one-year contract. He remained at the club until the end of the 2004–05 season.

Fleming briefly joined Shelbourne in the League of Ireland (managed by former St. Patrick's Athletic colleague Pat Fenlon), and played in the Champions League qualifiers, but at the end of the Irish 2005 season, Fleming officially retired.

== International career ==
Fleming was born in England to a Jamaican father and Irish mother, and moved to Ireland when he was a few months old. He made his international debut for Ireland in Prague against the Czech Republic national team on 29 April 1996 (and in the process netting St. Patrick's Athletic another £50,000 as part of his transfer deal). He would go on to win 10 caps under Mick McCarthy.

== After retirement ==
Fleming later worked as a pundit on Setanta Sports for a period during 2006 and was linked with the position of assistant manager to Pat Fenlon at Derry City in the League of Ireland. His playing career has continued at an amateur level, with Fleming appearing regularly in the 2006–07 season for Northern League side Billingham Synthonia as a central defender. Curtis is a valued supporter of the charity Show Racism the Red Card and spoke with passion and humour about his experiences of racism in the game at SRTRC's fifteenth anniversary event at UNISON HQ on 3 August 2011.

Curtis Fleming is also a patron of the charity Justice First and took part in a fundraising event at Goals Soccer Saturday with his team The Misfits losing 5–2 in the final to Hope athletic. Despite this Curtis graciously handed over the trophy to the winners.

== Coaching career ==
Fleming later coached at youth level at Middlesbrough and joined Livingston in June 2007, as assistant manager to Mark Proctor. In July 2011, Fleming joined former club Crystal Palace, managed by former Eagles teammate Dougie Freedman, as Development Coach. In July 2012, Fleming was promoted to the role of first team coach at Crystal Palace, yet moved on four months later to join Freedman in a similar role at Bolton Wanderers.

In February 2016, Fleming joined former Boro teammate Craig Hignett at Hartlepool United as Assistant Manager. After less than a year at Hartlepool he was headhunted by Ian Holloway in December 2016 and moved to Queens Park Rangers as Assistant Manager. He moved to Middlesbrough as First Team coach in 2018 and left the club after the departure of Tony Pulis in May 2019. In 2019, he was appointed as the reserve team coach of Indian club Punjab FC for 2019–20 season. On 15 June 2020, he was appointed as the head coach of the main team.

On 28 July 2021 Fleming was appointed as a temporary coach for Championship side Bristol City to stand in for Paul Simpson who took time off to receive treatment for renal cell carcinoma. On 22 September 2021 Fleming was appointed as assistant manager at Ashton Gate on a permanent basis. Following the sacking of Nigel Pearson, Fleming took charge of Bristol City as the interim manager. Fleming took charge of Bristol City against Sheffield Wednesday winning 1-0. Fleming resigned on the day of the appointment of Liam Manning as Nigel Pearson's successor.

On 12 January 2024, Fleming became assistant head coach at Charlton Athletic under Michael Appleton.

On 24 January 2024, it was announced that Fleming would take interim charge of the side following the departure of Michael Appleton.

== Honours ==
St Patrick's Athletic

- League of Ireland Premier Division: 1989–90

Middlesbrough

- Football League First Division: 1994–95
- FA Cup runner-up: 1996–97
- Football League Cup runner-up: 1996–97, 1997–98

== See also ==
- List of Republic of Ireland international footballers born outside the Republic of Ireland
