= Miljenko Kovačić =

Croatian footballer

Personal information
- Date of birth: 19 March 1973
- Place of birth: Zagreb, SR Croatia, SFR Yugoslavia
- Date of death: 20 August 2005 (aged 32)
- Place of death: Sveta Helena, Croatia
- Height: 1.81 m (5 ft 11 1/2 in)
- Position: Forward

Senior career*
Years	Team	Apps	(Gls)
1993–1996	Croatia Zagreb	26	(7)
1996–1999	Brescia	18	(2)
2000–2001	PIK Vrbovec		
2001–2003	Slaven Belupo	57	(14)
2003–2004	Hapoel Petah Tikva	30	(2)
- * Club domestic league appearances and goals

Miljenko Kovačić (19 March 1973 – 20 August 2005) was a Croatian football player. His nickname was "The Son of the Wind".

== Club career ==
He played professionally for quite a few teams, most notably for Dinamo Zagreb with which he was part of the national championship victory in 1995–1996 and Brescia (Italy). Certain choices he made in his professional career were interesting, at one point he quit playing because of religious reasons (he was a member of the Hare Krishna religion) stating money being the root of evil and that he was content with what he had. This was a shock to his employer at the time, the professional Italian team Brescia. Kovačić did return to professional soccer briefly in 2001, but quit again in 2005 due to family reasons.

== Death ==
He lost his life in a motorcycle accident in 2005.
