= Abdoul Karim Sylla (footballer, born 1981) =

Guinean footballer

Personal information
- Date of birth: 10 January 1981 (age 45)
- Place of birth: Fria, Guinea
- Height: 1.75 m (5 ft 9 in)
- Position: Midfielder

Senior career*
Years	Team	Apps	(Gls)
- Kaloum Star
- ASEC Abidjan
- Obuasi Goldfields
- Satellite
2001–2004	Lokeren	16	(0)
- FC Strombeek
2004–2005	Diyarbakirspor		
- Hafia FC
- Hasselt
- Hanuit
2016	Uttaradit		

International career
- Guinea
- * Club domestic league appearances and goals

Abdoul Karim Sylla (born 10 January 1981) is a Guinean former professional footballer who played as a midfielder.

== Club career ==
Sylla was born in Fria. He previously played for KSC Lokeren in the Belgian First Division and Diyarbakirspor in the Turkish Süper Lig.

== International career ==
He was part of the Guinean 2004 African Nations Cup team, who finished second in their group in the first round of competition, before losing in the quarter-finals to Mali.
