= Nicolas Bonnal =

French footballer (born 1976)

Personal information
- Date of birth: 16 October 1976 (age 50)
- Place of birth: Saint-Priest, Metropolis of Lyon, France
- Height: 1.84 m (6 ft 0 in)
- Position: Midfielder

Senior career*
Years	Team	Apps	(Gls)
1992–1997	Monaco B		
1995	Monaco	1	(0)
1997–2000	Ajaccio		
2000–2001	Monaco	19	(1)
2002	Troyes	0	(0)
2002–2003	Lille	14	(0)
2003–2004	→ Ajaccio (loan)	21	(1)
2005	Ajaccio	16	(0)
2005–2007	Reims	42	(0)
2007–2008	Bastelicaccia		

Managerial career
- 2009–2010: Afa (youth)
- 2010–2017: Ajaccio (youth)
- 2017–2019: AS Porto-Vecchio
- * Club domestic league appearances and goals

Nicolas Bonnal (born 16 October 1976) is a French former professional footballer who played as a midfielder and later worked as a manager.
