= Georgi Kipiani =

Georgian footballer

George Kipiani გიორგი ყიფიანი
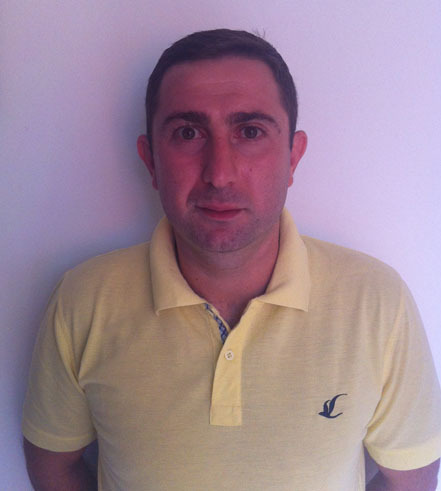

Personal information
- Full name: George Kipiani
- Date of birth: 12 August 1978 (age 48)
- Place of birth: Tbilisi, Georgian SSR
- Height: 1.80 m (5 ft 11 in)
- Position: Midfielder

Team information
- Current team: Georgia U19 (Manager)

Senior career*
Years	Team	Apps	(Gls)
1993–1995	Avaza Tbilisi	36	(4)
1995–1996	Akademia Tbilisi	31	(1)
1996–1997	Sioni Bolnisi	7	(0)
1997–1998	Metalurgi Rustavi	14	(1)
1998–1999	Torpedo Kutaisi	4	(0)
1999	→ Aris Thessaloniki (loan)	0	(0)
1999	→ Panetolikos (loan)	5	(0)
1999–2003	WIT Georgia	63	(5)
2001	→ Torpedo Moscow (loan)	0	(0)
2001–2002	→ Maccabi Kiryat Gat (loan)	20	(1)
2003–2004	Torpedo Kutaisi	7	(0)
2004–2005	Skonto	9	(0)
2005–2006	Torpedo Kutaisi	11	(2)
2006–2007	Hapoel Jerusalem	4	(0)

International career
1998–2001	Georgia	2	(0)

Managerial career
- 2010–2011: Sioni Bolnisi (assistant)
- 2011–2012: Zestaponi (assistant)
- 2012–2013: Metalurgi Rustavi
- 2014–2016: Hapoel Rishon LeZion (assistant)
- 2016–: Georgia U19
- * Club domestic league appearances and goals

George Kipiani (Georgian: გიორგი ყიფიანი; born 12 August 1978) is a former Georgian professional football player and currently the coach of Georgia national under-19 football team.
