= Pat Dolan =

Irish footballer (born 1967)

Personal information
- Full name: Patrick Dolan
- Date of birth: 20 September 1967 (age 59)
- Place of birth: Galway, Ireland
- Height: 5 ft 11 in (1.80 m)
- Position: Midfielder

Youth career
- 1981–1983: West Ham United

Senior career*
Years	Team	Apps	(Gls)
1983–1988	Arsenal	0	(0)
1986–1987	→ Walsall (loan)	1	(0)
1987–1988	Walsall	2	(0)
1987–1988	→ St Patrick's Athletic (loan)	4	(0)
1988–1989	Hendon	16	(0)
1989–1990	Galway United	30	(4)
1990–1991	Shamrock Rovers	18	(2)
1991–1993	St Patrick's Athletic	34	(5)
Total		103	(11)

International career
1986–1987	Republic of Ireland U21	3	(1)

Managerial career
- 1996–1998: St Patrick's Athletic
- 1999–2003: St Patrick's Athletic
- 2003–2005: Cork City
- * Club domestic league appearances and goals

Patrick Dolan (born 20 September 1967) is an Irish former football player, manager, and executive. He is also a former soccer analyst on RTÉ Sport. He is a FIFA-registered players' agent and has represented a number of players based in the English Premier League and English Football League Championship divisions. He also writes articles in the Irish Daily Star and acts within an ambassador role for a small number of Dublin hotels.

== Early life ==
Dolan, and his twin Eamonn Dolan, moved to Chelmsford as children and both began life as trainee footballers with West Ham United. They both played for the Republic of Ireland at the 1985 FIFA World Youth Championship and Under 21 level. Both had made their Irish international debut at Republic of Ireland national under-17 football team level against Northern Ireland in the first ever fixture between the two nations at Seaview in a 6–1 friendly win in January 1985.

== Early career ==
Dolan signed YTS forms with Arsenal when he turned sixteen and made numerous appearances for both the youth and reserve team. Paul Merson recalls playing with Dolan together in the Arsenal youth team and even how Dolan would regularly be invited to stay over at his parents' house .

In 1988, he was loaned out to Walsall to gain experience and soon made the move permanent. The following year, having failed to make the impact expected of him, he was loaned out to League of Ireland side St. Patrick's Athletic. He made his League of Ireland debut at Richmond Park on 28 February 1988.

After a handful of appearances he returned to Walsall but was promptly released. He signed for Paul McGee at Galway United for the 1989–90 League of Ireland Premier Division season where he missed only two league games as the Tribesmen finished 8th.

Dolan made his Galway debut on 10 September at Terryland Park

His first ever club goal came against his former club on 1 October as Dolan headed in the equaliser

The following season he moved to Shamrock Rovers. He scored on his first start at Turners Cross (where he had also scored his only Ireland U21 goal) on 28 October. He was an unused substitute in the 1991 FAI Cup Final when Rovers lost to Galway United. After Rovers maiden season in the RDS Arena (3 goals in 23 total appearances) he joined St Patrick's Athletic on a full-time deal in 1991.

== St Patrick's Athletic ==
Dolan joined St Pats when the club was in a state of poverty. They were playing in Harold's Cross Stadium while they tried to raise enough funds to return to Richmond Park. As St Pats could not justify his salary purely on footballing grounds, Dolan was employed as Commercial Manager. Within months he had ignited the local business community and new sponsors came on board.

Dolan played in the 1992/93 FAI League Cup Final and his last game was the 1993 FAI Cup semi final at Dundalk on 18 April. As Dolan's injuries got worse he retired from football and was appointed chief executive.

Dolan worked closely with manager Brian Kerr and new chairman Tim O'Flaherty (a respected local businessman), and in December 1993 St Pats returned to Richmond Park.

Over the next 3 years the club went from strength to strength as Dolan's marketing and Kerr's team building saw the Saints win the league title in 1996. In the December of that year Kerr was appointed Director of Coaching by the FAI. Chairman O'Flaherty surprised most with his appointment of Dolan for team manager with most commentators believing that Kerr's assistant Liam Buckley would get the job. In January 1997 Dolan was appointed manager of Pats. At 28 he was the youngest manager in the history of the club.

Buckley resigned in protest but crucially, Dolan kept respected coach Noel O'Reilly on his staff. After a disappointing finish to his first season, Dolan spent relatively large sums on securing the top young Irish players available and signed three of the Ireland team that finished third in the 1997 FIFA World Youth Championship. His large squad won the 1997/98 League championship on the last day of the season as arch rivals Shelbourne lost a 2-point lead. After leading St Pats to a credible performance in the Champions League against Celtic in September 1998 Dolan resigned as manager to concentrate on his new roles as managing director and Director of Football. He had also purchased a major shareholding in the club.

Liam Buckley was persuaded back into the club to take the managerial hot seat. Buckley would lead the Saints to a second straight league title and Dolan continued to work effectively as managing director. The following December Pats lost 3 successive games and despite lying in third position in the league, Buckley was sacked. Dolan was immediately reinstated as team manager but could only steer the club to sixth place.

== Dublin Saints and the registration season ==
Early into the 1999/2000 season saw the first cracks in the relationship between Dolan and St Pats fans, as he accused a section of fans of being drunk and overly abusive to a new player, Martin Garrett. Dolan used his match day programme notes to lambaste the Pats travelling fans and, inevitably, the fans hit back. The team finished in fifth position. The following season, acting in his capacity as CEO, Dolan began negotiations with St Francis, with a view to merging. His use of terms like 'Dublin Saints' and 'Pats-Francis' in both his programme notes and his column for national newspaper the Irish Daily Star angered many Pats fans and in a stormy meeting held by the club to announce their plans, many sought his resignation. Backed by staunchly loyal chairman O'Flaherty, Dolan remained in both jobs. Before the end of the season the merger was off but the damage was most certainly done in the eyes of many fans.

The following season saw the Saints improve dramatically on the pitch and they were leading the league when the FAI announced they were deducting 9 points from St Pats total as they played an ineligible player, Paul Marney, for 3 games. St Pats strongly argued it was a clerical error and as Marney had been registered properly they did not seek to gain an advantage. The FAI overturned this decision and re-instated the nine points, much to the annoyance of closest rivals, Shelbourne's chief executive Oliver Byrne. Dolan and Shelbourne manager Dermot Keely traded insults in their competing tabloid columns on a weekly basis. After receiving an anonymous tip off, the league investigated the registration of every St Pats player and found that one, Charles Livingstone Mbabazi, wasn't correct. They deducted fifteen points and St Pats' title challenge lay in tatters. St Pats, again, angrily denied the charges and a leaked report (to the Evening Herald) commissioned by new league CEO Roy Dooney apparently exposed several minor irregularities in player registrations on several teams but was never released. However, only St Pats were punished and they would settle for third place in the league. St Pats started the season as they ended the previous one and for the first time progressed in Europe beating HNK Rijeka in the Intertoto Cup. Only an away goals defeat to KAA Gent stopped further progress.

However the levels of performance dropped and a section of the St Pats support openly protested against Dolan, with a "Dolan Out" banner appearing at games. The majority of St Pat's fans had huge appreciation for what Dolan had achieved for the club, and they still do to this day. It took a late winner at home to Cork in St Pats' last home game for Dolan to avoid bringing the team into the relegation playoff. In February 2003, Dolan parted company with St Pats to take the high-profile job at Cork City. It left St Pats fans divided with the following season seeing many terrace debates between Pro and Anti Dolan camps.

== Cork City ==
In March 2003, Dolan was appointed team manager of Cork City. Cork had finished in fourth place in 2002/2003 but with the exciting partnership of John O'Flynn and George O'Callaghan, many pundits expected their challenge to be stronger. Dolan brought Kevin Doyle, who he had given his debut with Pats to Cork, and he caught the imagination of the Cork public and much like his Saintmania and Supersaint tags, and along with Brian Lennox re-branded Cork City as the Rebel Army. He would lead Cork to 3rd position in his first season, 16 points behind league winners Shelbourne. The following season, Dolan invested heavily in players and it seemed to pay off as Cork beat Malmö FF and NEC Nijmegen in the Intertoto Cup before falling to Nantes. Dolan would improve Cork to second place in the league and they finished only three points behind winners Shelbourne. Shortly before the beginning of the 2005 season, Cork announced that Pat Dolan was no longer manager of the club.

Much like his departure at St Pats, no formal announcement was made as to the reasons behind it. In another mirroring of the St Pats departure, Cork fans were split into Pro and Anti Dolan camps. Dolan had finished building a strong team at Cork, following the good work first laid out by Dave Barry and then Liam Murphy, and the club went on to win the league title in 2005 under new manager Damien Richardson, with the notable addition of Roy O'Donovan. A key factor in the victory in 2005 was the ability for Cork City to finally beat Shelbourne, something which they never managed while Dolan was in charge.

== Waterford United ==
In September 2005 Dolan was appointed as an "advisor" for the Blues and their under pressure manager Brendan Rea. At the time of his appointment, Waterford United were at the foot of the table and doomed to an impending relegation. However, Dolan's appointment inspired Waterford United to a remarkable turnaround, and eventually the team secured their status in the league comfortably with two games to spare. They eventually finished 8th place in the Premier League, seven points clear of the relegation playoff spot that for so long looked theirs. Many believe Dolan's success at Waterford United was his greatest achievement, given the despairing position the club was in before his appointment. He left his role at the club at the end of this season.

== Media ==
Throughout his St Pats and Cork City days Dolan wrote a weekly column in the tabloid newspaper Irish Daily Star. His outspoken and often controversial column saw Dolan's profile rise outside the League of Ireland scene. After his departure from Cork City, Dolan joined Setanta Sports as their main football pundit. He continues to front their Setanta Sports Cup coverage, as well as commentating on Serie A, Champions League and UEFA Cup football. He is also now a regular guest on soccer radio show and podcast World Soccer Daily. Dolan is parodied, to some acclaim, by Apres Match. On 7 December 2009, in his weekly Star column, Dolan was fiercely critical of the Irish international team's pursuit of players born outside Ireland.

== Wexford Youths ==
In 2007 Dolan took on the role as Head Coach of the newly formed League of Ireland First Division outfit, Wexford Youths. Dolan assisted manager and owner Mick Wallace on a part-time basis due to his media commitments.

== Search for new Ireland manager, and appointment of Trapattoni ==
Through his weekly column in the Irish Daily Star and regular appearances on Setanta Sports, Dolan was fiercely critical of the FAI's recruitment process to find a new senior International team manager.

The holder of a FA coaching badge, he is currently a FIFA-registered players' agent.

== Sources ==
- Paul Doolan; Robert Goggins. The Hoops. ISBN 0-7171-2121-6.

Preceded by Brian Kerr	St Patrick's Athletic manager 1996–1998	Succeeded by Pete Mahon

Preceded by Liam Buckley	St Patrick's Athletic manager 1999–2003	Succeeded by Eamonn Collins
