= Juuso Kangaskorpi =

Finnish footballer and manager (born 1975)

Personal information
- Date of birth: 4 September 1975 (age 51)
- Place of birth: Mikkeli, Finland
- Height: 1.79 m (5 ft 10 1/2 in)
- Position: Defender

Senior career*
Years	Team	Apps	(Gls)
1993–1995	MP	56	(6)
1996–1997	MyPa	41	(7)
1998–1999	VPS	49	(4)
2000–2008	FC Haka	227	(19)
2009–2010	MP	27	(5)
Total		400	(41)

International career
2003–2006	Finland	7	(0)
- * Club domestic league appearances and goals

Juuso Kangaskorpi (born 1975) is a Finnish football defender and manager who currently is player-manager of for the Ykkönen side Mikkelin Palloilijat. Kangaskorpi was a long-time captain of FC Haka in Veikkausliiga and coached the clubs A-juniors in 2008 before returning to his hometown club. He won the Finnish Cup with his side FC Haka in 2002 and 2005.

He has six caps for the Finland national football team.
