= Patrik Gross =

Czech footballer (born 1978)

Personal information
- Full name: Patrik Gross
- Date of birth: 6 May 1978 (age 48)
- Place of birth: Ostrava, Czechoslovakia
- Height: 1.83 m (6 ft 0 in)
- Position: Centre back

Team information
- Current team: OFK Malženice

Youth career
- 1987–1993: SK Polanka
- 1993–1997: Vítkovice

Senior career*
Years	Team	Apps	(Gls)
1997–1998	FK Dukla Hranice		
1999–2000	MSA Dolní Benešov		
2000–2002	Vítkovice	42	(4)
2002–2005	Teplice	15	(2)
2004	→ Viktoria Plzeň (loan)	10	(0)
2004–2005	→ Ústí nad Labem (loan)		
2005–2010	Kladno	72	(1)
2007	→ Zenit Čáslav (loan)	14	(0)
2010–2013	Spartak Trnava	65	(5)
2013–	OFK Malženice	0	(0)
- * Club domestic league appearances and goals as of 30 April 2013

Patrik Gross (born 6 May 1978) is a Czech football defender.

He was born in Ostrava, Czech Republic. He started with Vitkovice in 2000 and played for FK Teplice, Viktoria Pizen, Usti nad Labem, Kladno, Zenit Caslav, Spartak Trnava in 2013.
