= John McDonnell (footballer) =

Irish footballer & manager (born 1965)

Personal information
- Date of birth: 26 March 1965 (age 61)
- Place of birth: Dublin, Ireland
- Position: Defender

Youth career
- 1973–1983: Belvedere

Senior career*
Years	Team	Apps	(Gls)
1983–1984	Shamrock Rovers	1	(0)
1984–1986	Home Farm	22	(0)
1986–1987	Drogheda United	18	(0)
1987–1991	St Patrick's Athletic		
1991–1992	Shamrock Rovers	28	(1)
1992–1997	St Patrick's Athletic	142	(8)
1997–1999	Newry Town		
1999–2001	Home Farm		
2001–2002	Dublin City		

International career
1991–1997	League of Ireland XI	2	(0)

Managerial career
- 1998–1999: Newry Town
- 2001–2002: Dublin City
- 2003–2004: Shelbourne (assistant)
- 2004–2008: St Patrick's Athletic
- 2009–2010: Newry City
- 2010–2011: Faroe Islands (assistant)
- 2013–2014: Shelbourne
- 2014–2015: Drogheda United
- * Club domestic league appearances and goals

John McDonnell (born 26 March 1965 in Dublin) is an Irish football manager and former footballer. He most recently managed Drogheda United, having also managed Dublin City, St Patrick's Athletic, Newry City, Shelbourne and been assistant manager of the Faroe Islands.

Nicknamed "Johnny Mac", he had a long career as a footballer before entering management. The majority of his career was spent at St Patrick's Athletic and he captained the side to the 1996 League of Ireland Championship.

== Career ==
=== Playing career ===
As a defender, McDonnell started his career with Shamrock Rovers in the 1983–84 season (five total appearances), followed by Home Farm, Drogheda United before signing for Pats. After winning the league there he signed back for Rovers for the 1991–92 where he scored once in 34 appearances.

He then signed back for another spell at Richmond Park where he captained the side to the League triumph in the 1995–96 season under manager Brian Kerr. Despite missing out on the Champions League due to then format in the first ever European tie at Richmond Park McDonnell scored in the UEFA Cup tie with SK Slovan Bratislava.

He then moved to Newry Town. It was with the Northern Irish club that he made the first step into management, becoming player-manager in 1998.

In this first ever season in European competition, Newry Town (as they were then known) were drawn against the Croatia side Hrvatski Dragovoljac. A 1–0 defeat in Croatia was followed by a historic 2–0 win at home to send the club into the second round. There they met Bundesliga side MSV Duisburg. Again, Newry were drawn away in the first leg, coming away with a respectable 2–0 defeat to the German professionals. A 1–0 win at home wasn't enough to force extra time but the side had exceeded expectations in the tournament.

He resigned in September 1999.

=== Management career ===
Having previously been player-manager for Newry Town, the chance came to manage at newly founded League of Ireland side Dublin City then he was appointed as assistant manager at then league champions Shelbourne. McDonnell was assistant manager of the Republic of Ireland national team Under 20s at the 2003 FIFA World Youth Championships.

In 2004, when Eamonn Collins resigned as St Pats manager, the club turned to its former captain and firm fans' favourite, McDonnell, to turn around the fortunes of the ailing Dublin giant. (Ironically Collins would take McDonnell's job as Pat Fenlon's assistant.) His side initially struggled and only a late burst at the end of the 2005 season saw St. Pats saved from a humiliating relegation. For the 2006 season, he assembled practically a whole new squad and reached the final of the FAI Cup losing to Derry City 4–3. He then guided Pats to their best ever European run in the UEFA Cup in the 2008/2009 season where they qualified for the first round proper after eliminating JFK Olimps Riga and IF Elfsborg.

He is the first St Pats player to win the League of Ireland, score and manage the club in European competition.

In January 2009, he departed as St Patrick's Athletic manager. He was then linked with the Assistant Manager position at Leeds United, the Manager position at Cork City and manager positions at League 2 sides Barnet and AFC Bournemouth.

In September 2009, he returned to Irish League side Newry City as manager following the resignation of Gerry Flynn. In March 2010, he resigned. In April 2010, he was appointed Assistant Manager of the Faroe Islands, by manager Brian Kerr, his former colleague at St Pat's. Kerr and McDonnell resigned in October 2011.

On 24 May 2013, McDonnell was appointed manager of Shelbourne.

McDonnell was appointed Drogheda United boss on 29 November 2014.

== Honours ==
St Patrick's Athletic

- League of Ireland Premier Division: 1989–90, 1995–96

Shamrock Rovers

- SRFC Young Player of the Year: 1983–84
