= João Pedro (footballer, born 1975) =

Portuguese footballer

Personal information
- Full name: João Pedro Fernandes
- Date of birth: 9 March 1975 (age 51)
- Place of birth: Pontoise, France
- Height: 1.71 m (5 ft 7 1/2 in)
- Position: Striker

Youth career
- 1987−1988: Chaves
- 1991−1992: Ginásio da Sé
- 1992−1993: Benfica

Senior career*
Years	Team	Apps	(Gls)
1993−1994	Vieira		
1994−1995	Fafe	22	(6)
1995−1996	Montalegre		
1996−1997	Ribeirão	13	(7)
1998−2002	Salgueiros	121	(31)
2002−2003	Santa Clara	26	(7)
2003−2007	Leixões	66	(27)
Total		248	(78)
- * Club domestic league appearances and goals

João Pedro Fernandes (born 9 March 1975), known as João Pedro, is a Portuguese retired footballer who played as a striker.

Over the course of six seasons, he amassed Primeira Liga totals of 147 matches and 38 goals, mainly at S.C. Salgueiros.

== Club career ==
Born in Pontoise, on the suburbs of Paris, João Pedro started his professional career with Vieira S.C. in the Terceira Divisão, reaching S.C. Salgueiros four years later, where he would spend the majority of his career, eventually becoming team captain.

After scoring 12 goals in 34 games in his last season, not being able to prevent relegation from the Primeira Liga, João Pedro signed with C.D. Santa Clara also in the top flight. He retired in 2007 at the age of 32, after four years with Leixões S.C. in the Segunda Liga.
