= Tomáš Mica =

Czech footballer

Personal information
- Full name: Tomáš Mica
- Date of birth: 25 May 1983 (age 43)
- Place of birth: Brno, Czechoslovakia
- Height: 1.76 m (5 ft 9 in)
- Position: Striker

Senior career*
Years	Team	Apps	(Gls)
2001–2004	FC Synot	25	(1)
2004–2005	Naftex Burgas	38	(2)
2006–2007	Wil	36	(2)
2008	Caravaggese	28	(4)
2008	La Chaux-de-Fonds	7	(0)
2009–2010	Yverdon-Sport FC	17	(0)

International career^{‡}
2002–2003	Czech Republic U20	6	(1)
- * Club domestic league appearances and goals as of 7 October 2008 ‡ National team caps and goals as of 7 October 2008

Tomáš Mica (born 25 May 1983 in Brno) is a Czech association footballer.
