= Václav Činčala =

Czech footballer

Personal information
- Date of birth: 23 April 1974 (age 52)
- Place of birth: Ostrava
- Height: 1.86 m (6 ft 1 in)
- Position: Forward

Senior career*
| Years | Team | Apps | (Gls) |
- Baník Ostrava
| 1998–1999 | Karviná | | |
| 1999–2000 | VFC Plauen | | |
| 2000–2001 | Bohemians | | |
| 2001–2004 | Synot | | |
| 2004–2007 | Zlín | | |
| 2007–2008 | Synot | | |
- * Club domestic league appearances and goals

Václav Činčala (born 23 April 1974) is a retired Czech football striker. He started his Czech First League career with Baník Ostrava, going on to play for Karviná, Bohemians, Synot, and Zlín.
