= Damir Grlić =

Croatian footballer

Personal information
- Date of birth: 14 August 1975 (age 51)
- Place of birth: Zagreb, SR Croatia
- Position: Defender

Team information
- Current team: Vejle (assistant manager)

Senior career*
| Years | Team | Apps | (Gls) |
| 1999–2000 | Hrvatski Dragovoljac | 4 | (0) |
| 2000–2000 | Marila Pribram | 15 | (0) |
| 2001–2003 | Teplice | 14 | (0) |
| 2002 | → Chomutov (loan) | | |
| 2003–2004 | Mladá Boleslav | | |
| 2004–2010 | Radnik Velika Gorica | | |
| 2010–2011 | Udarnik | | |

Managerial career
- 2011–2015: Gorica (youth)
- 2015–2017: Gorica (assistant)
- 2017–2018: Gorica
- 2018: Gorica (assistant)
- 2018–2019: HAŠK
- 2019–2020: Istra 1961 (assistant)
- 2021–2022: Bistra
- 2022-: Vejle (assistant)
- * Club domestic league appearances and goals

Damir Grlić (born 14 August 1975) is a Croatian football manager and former player who is assistant to manager Ivan Prelec at Danish side Vejle BK. He also worked with Prelec at Gorica and Istra. He played as a defender.
