= Michal Meduna =

Czech retired footballer (born 1981)

Personal information
- Date of birth: 31 August 1981 (age 45)
- Place of birth: Pardubice, Czechoslovakia
- Height: 1.87 m (6 ft 2 in)
- Position: Striker

Senior career*
Years	Team	Apps	(Gls)
1999–2000	Lázně Bohdaneč	25	(0)
2000–2001	AS Pardubice	22	(4)
2001–2004	1. FC Synot	83	(13)
2004–2005	Sparta Prague	24	(3)
2005–2007	Vestel Manisaspor	27	(11)
2007	Sokol Živanice		
2007–2012	ASKÖ Pregarten		
2013–2018	SV Eibenstein		

International career
2001–2002	Czech Republic U20	3	(1)
2002	Czech Republic U21	1	(0)
- * Club domestic league appearances and goals

Michal Meduna (born 31 August 1981) is a Czech retired footballer.

== Career ==
Meduna has played for several clubs in the Czech Republic and spent time with Vestel Manisaspor in Turkey. While playing there, he suffered a serious heart attack on 19 August 2006, which caused him to retire from professional football at the age of just 25. After the accident, he played for Sokol Živanice in Czech lower divisions.
