= Luděk Zelenka =

Czech footballer

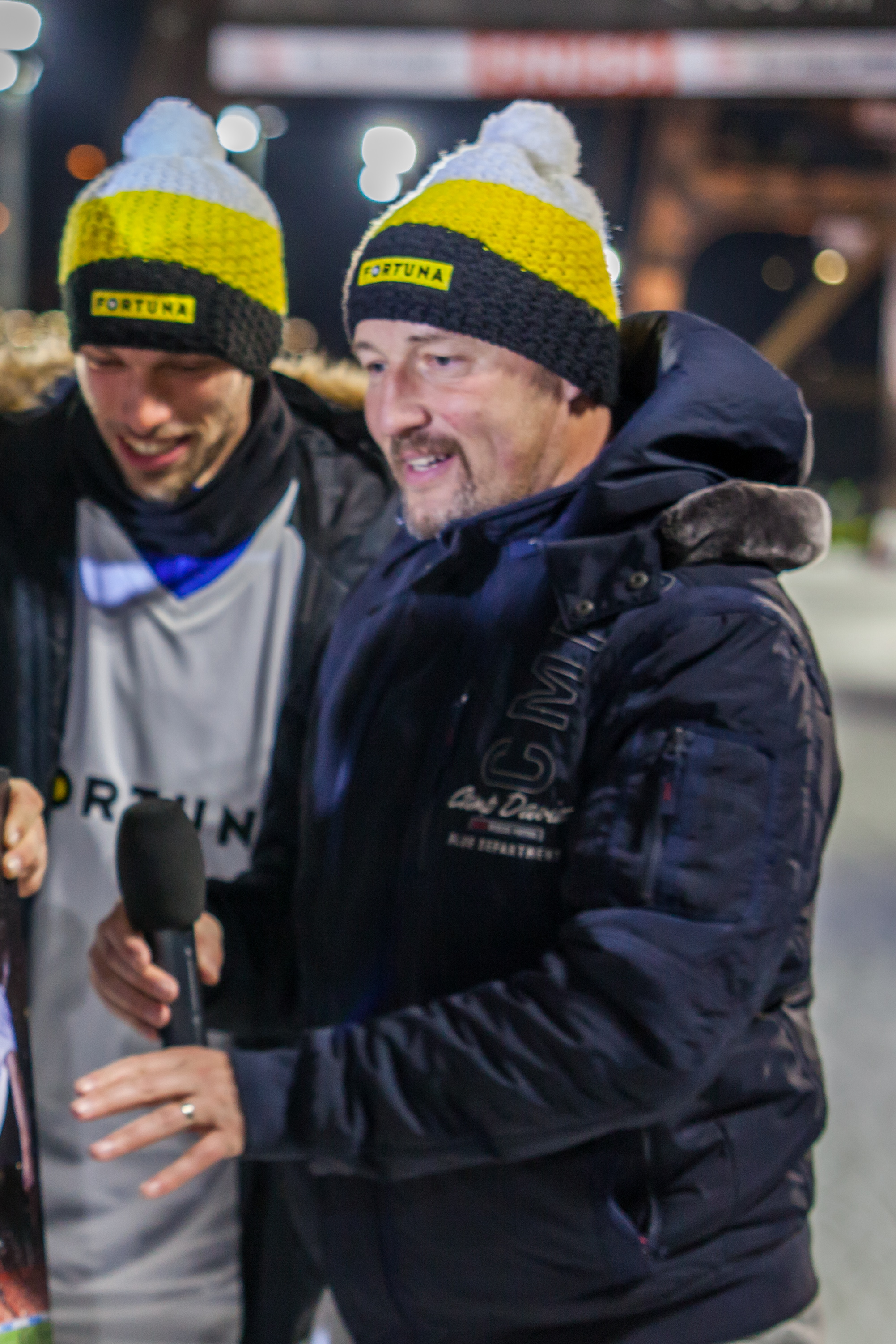

Personal information
- Date of birth: 11 September 1973 (age 53)
- Place of birth: Liberec, Czechoslovakia
- Position: Striker

Youth career
- 1982–1992: FC Slovan Liberec

Senior career*
Years	Team	Apps	(Gls)
1992–1993	FK Český Dub		
1993–1995	FK Český ráj Turnov		
1995–1996	FK Jablonec	39	(7)
1997–1999	Viktoria Žižkov	62	(16)
1999–2002	Slavia Prague	85	(21)
2002–2003	FK Teplice	39	(11)
2004	FK Chmel Blšany	29	(12)
2005–2007	1. FC Brno	68	(25)
2007	FK Jablonec	12	(0)
2008	→ FC Kärnten (loan)	12	(2)
2008–2009	FK Dukla Prague	25	(10)
2009	→ Bohemians 1905 (loan)	8	(0)
- * Club domestic league appearances and goals

Luděk Zelenka (born 11 September 1973) is a former Czech football player.

Zelenka played for various top Gambrinus liga clubs during his career and was a prolific goalscorer. In the 2004-2005 season he scored 12 goals, becoming the second best goalscorer of the season. At the end of 2009 he ended his professional career.
