= Davor Bajsić =

Croatian footballer (born 1974)

Personal information
- Date of birth: 4 January 1974 (age 52)
- Place of birth: Osijek
- Height: 1.78 m (5 ft 10 in)
- Position: Midfielder

Senior career*
Years	Team	Apps	(Gls)
1990–1994	Osijek	38+	(6+)
1996–1997	Cibalia	26	(4)
2000–2002	Slaven Belupo	25	(4)
2002–2003	Hapoel Ironi Rishon LeZion	7	(1)
2003–2005	Kamen Ingrad		
2005–2006	NK Zadar		
2007–2008	Grafičar Vodovod		
2008	Mladost Antin		
2009	Sydney United 58		

Managerial career
- 2017: Sydney United 58 FC
- 2023-2024: Hurstville Zagreb
- * Club domestic league appearances and goals

Davor Bajsić (born 4 January 1974) is a retired Croatian football midfielder and later manager. He briefly managed Sydney United in 2017, before being released three rounds into the season. He would later be head coach of Hurstville Zagreb between 2023-2024 in NSW League Two.
