= Jan Palinek =

Czech footballer (born 1969)

Personal information
- Date of birth: 13 February 1969 (age 57)
- Place of birth: Přerov, Czechoslovakia
- Height: 1.80 m (5 ft 11 in)
- Position: Defender

Youth career
- 1975–1986: TJ Spartak PS Prerov
- 1986–1988: Baník Ostrava
- 1988–1990: VTJ Tábor

Senior career*
| Years | Team | Apps | (Gls) |
| 1990–1993 | Baník Ostrava | 34 | (3) |
| 1993–1995 | Drnovice | 51 | (2) |
| 1995–2002 | Brno | 148 | (6) |
| 2001–2006 | Slovácko | 101 | (2) |
- * Club domestic league appearances and goals

Jan Palinek (born 13 February 1969) is a Czech former football player. He played 334 top-flight matches in Czechoslovakia and the Czech Republic. After making 34 appearances in the Czechoslovak First League for Baník Ostrava, Palinek went on to play 300 times in the Gambrinus liga for various clubs including Drnovice, Brno and Slovácko.

Following his professional career, Palinek moved to TJ Vlčnov to play on an amateur basis.
