= Charles Livingstone Mbabazi =

Ugandan footballer and coach (born 1980)

- Mbabazi celebrates St Patrick's Athletic's FAI Cup semi-final win in 2003

Personal information
- Full name: Charles Livingstone Mbabazi
- Date of birth: 18 October 1980 (age 46)
- Place of birth: Uganda
- Position: Midfielder

Senior career*
Years	Team	Apps	(Gls)
1999	Kampala City Council FC		
1999–2003	St Patrick's Athletic	86	(20)
2006–2008	Hà Nội ACB		
2009–2010	Binh Duong		
2011–2013	Wandegeya		

International career
1998–2003	Uganda	36	(7)

Managerial career
- 2013–2014: Bright Stars
- 2015: Somalia
- 2020–2023: Onduparaka
- 2023–2024: Vipers
- 2024–: Mbarara City
- * Club domestic league appearances and goals

Charles Livingstone Mbabazi (born 18 October 1980) is a Ugandan football coach and former player who played for St Patrick's Athletic in the League of Ireland Premier Division and the Uganda national team. He was a versatile player with the ability to play on either wing or as a forward. During his time at the club he used the name Mbabazi on the back of his jersey.

== Playing career ==
Mbabazi was introduced to St Patrick's by his then agent John Fashanu. He had previously been playing for Al Ahly SC in the Egyptian Premier League. After protracted negotiations for his international release with the Federation of Uganda Football Associations, he made his Saints debut on Saint Stephen's Day 1999 against Athlone Town in the Leinster Senior Cup. Mbabazi became a huge fans' favourite, scoring his first goal against Longford Town in a League match at Richmond Park. Memorably, he scored a goal at home to Bray Wanderers, just four days after the death of his father and brother in Uganda. He was regarded as a fan favorite whole playing for the club.

In June 2002, Mbabazi scored against HNK Rijeka in the 2002 UEFA Intertoto Cup. This game went down in history for Saints as their first ever win in European club competition. After going through on away goals, Charles again netted in the next round in the home tie against K.A.A. Gent.

In 2003, he was forced to retire temporarily due to a heart problem after collapsing on the pitch in a league game versus Bohemians. His testimonial against a Brian Kerr select took place in November 2004 before his return to Uganda. Mbabazi won 36 caps for Uganda.

== Managerial career ==
Mbabazi helped the Uganda national football team win the 2019 CECAFA Cup as assistant manager. In 2024, he was appointed manager of Ugandan side Mbarara City, helping the club achieve fifth place in the league.

== Personal life ==
Mbabazi was married. His wife died in 2010.

== Honours ==
St Patrick's Athletic

- League of Ireland Cup: 2003
