= Brian Kerr (Irish football manager) =

Irish footballer and manager

Personal information
- Date of birth: 3 March 1953 (age 73)
- Place of birth: Dublin, Ireland

Youth career
- Rialto FC
- Crumlin United
- Shelbourne FC

Senior career*
| Years | Team | Apps | (Gls) |
- Shelbourne FC
- Drumcondra FC
- Larkview FC
| 1982 | Bluebell United | | |

Managerial career
- 1986–1996: St Patrick's Athletic
- 1997–2003: Republic of Ireland (youth)
- 2003–2005: Republic of Ireland
- 2009–2011: Faroe Islands
- * Club domestic league appearances and goals

Brian Kerr (born 3 March 1953) is an Irish football manager. Kerr worked with the Republic of Ireland youth squads and also with the senior side. He was appointed as the full-time manager of the senior Ireland team on 26 January 2003. In 2007, Kerr became the Director of Football of St. Patrick's Athletic. Then, in 2009, he was confirmed as the head coach of the Faroe Islands national team. He left that post in October 2011.

Born in Dublin, Kerr grew up playing football and boxing. At the age of 13, he took his first coaching role with the Crumlin United under-11 side. Realising later that he didn't have the talent to become a top player, he decided to focus on coaching. In 1986, he was appointed manager of the League of Ireland side St Patrick's Athletic. In 1992, when the club was facing liquidation, Kerr was among the investors who raised IR£82,000 to help save the club. In December 1996, he left St Patrick's to become the technical director of the Football Association of Ireland.

== Early life ==
Brian Kerr was born on 5 March 1953 in Dublin. The youngest of five children, he grew up in Drimnagh, at the time a south-western suburban area of Dublin. One of Kerr's childhood friends in Drimnagh was future Olympic athlete and world champion runner, Eamonn Coughlan. Kerr began playing football for local schoolboy side Crumlin United along with Coughlan. He also took up boxing at Drimnagh Boxing Club where his father, Frankie Kerr, was a coach. Frankie had been an amateur boxing champion at bantamweight, travelling internationally for fights, and later took over the boxing club at Trinity College Dublin. At age 13, Kerr assumed his first coaching role when he took charge of the under-11 team at Crumlin United. Other sources have reported that he actually managed the under-12 team at age 15 or the under-13 team at age 18. In January 1968, when Kerr was still only 14, his father Frankie died from pneumonia at the age of 51.

Kerr gained employment in the botany department at University College Dublin as a trainee technician, while following his football interests. Kerr, although playing for Shelbourne B team, realised he did not possess enough talent to make it to the top as a footballer and at an early age decided to concentrate on coaching.

Kerr was then invited by Liam Tuohy to manage Shamrock Rovers B side in 1974. Kerr managed the Irish Technical Schools team during this time. He was reserve team manager at Shelbourne in 1978 and after a stint playing for Bluebell United, he was appointed assistant manager at Shels in 1983. The following season, he moved to Home Farm.

Kerr coached under Liam Tuohy with the Irish youth side that reached the World Cup finals in 1985. He resigned in April 1986. Soon after he was appointed assistant manager at Drogheda United under Mick Lawlor but left following Lawlor's resignation in November 1986.

== St. Patrick's Athletic ==
In December 1986, Kerr was appointed manager of League of Ireland side St Patrick's Athletic. Kerr told reporters that, being a fan and season ticket holder, his appointment as manager was a "dream come true". Within 3 weeks Kerr had won his first senior trophy as St. Pats won the Leinster Senior Cup. It was the Inchicore side's first trophy in a decade. Traditionally one of Ireland's poorer clubs, Kerr immediately set about rebuilding the squad on a shoe string budget. He acquired several players from junior and schoolboy football (such as future international Curtis Fleming) and rescued others from reserve leagues. This included John McDonnell, who went on to become manager of the club himself. St. Pats drew 1–1 with Dundalk in the last game of the 1987/88 season when a win would have seen St. Pats gain their first league title since 1956. In 1990, Kerr led St. Pats to that long cherished league championship.

As financial troubles hit St. Pats, Kerr was forced to offload his star players and all bar John Treacy left by 1993. In 1992, with the club facing liquidation, Kerr was among a group of investors (many of whom re-mortgaged their houses) who raised IR£82,000 which helped save the club from extinction. Once again Kerr was left the job of rebuilding a totally new squad and once again he showed he was more than capable as St. Pats won the league again 1996. In December 1996, he shocked St. Pats by quitting to become technical director of the Football Association of Ireland. Kerr is still idolised by fans of St Patrick's Athletic and most commentators attribute the further success the club have had largely down to the work started by Kerr.

== Republic of Ireland Youth coach ==
As part of his technical director remit, Kerr was manager of Republic of Ireland sides from under-16 to under-20 level. His first major tournament was the 1997 World Youth Championships. Kerr surprised many commentators by bringing 3 players from the League of Ireland but was proved correct when Republic of Ireland won bronze medals by finishing third. The undoubted star of the Irish team was Damien Duff.

The following year Kerr guided Republic of Ireland to an unprecedented double by winning both the under-16 and under-18 European Championships. No Irish team had ever won a major trophy before. A number of the players involved would go on to win full international caps, such as Richard Dunne, John O'Shea and Robbie Keane. In 1999, Ireland were knocked out of the World Youth Championships by hosts Nigeria on penalties in the round of 16. He again qualified Ireland for the 2003 World Youth Championships before taking up the position of manager of the senior national side.

== Republic of Ireland Senior Side ==
The first two matches of Ireland's qualification campaign for the 2004 European Championships in Portugal ended in defeat. The first was a 4–2 reverse away to Russia and the second a damaging 2–1 defeat at home to Switzerland. Mick McCarthy, who several months previously had taken the team to the knock-out stages of the 2002 World Cup, came under mounting pressure from fans and pundits alike and he resigned on 5 November 2002.

The Football Association of Ireland's (FAI) search for a successor took them past Peter Reid, Bryan Robson and Philippe Troussier and eventually led them to Kerr who was officially unveiled as Republic of Ireland manager on 26 January 2003. Despite the somewhat haphazard nature of his appointment (several leaks meant that most media outlets had been alerted as to the FAI's decision days in advance of the official announcement and Troussier was only notified of his failure to land the post after a member of the public phoned him to commiserate), Kerr was a popular choice for the position.

His background in Irish domestic football and his record with the Irish youth teams at under-16 and under-18 level meant that he enjoyed considerable support from within the domestic game and commanded the respect of talents such as Damien Duff and Robbie Keane - players that Kerr had managed in that capacity. Kerr enjoyed a reputation as one of the finest youth coaches in the world and also had no connection to the Saipan controversy that had engulfed the Irish team at the previous year's World Cup which raised the possibility of a return to the squad for the talismanic Manchester United midfielder Roy Keane. Despite the positivity of his appointment, there were some who voiced doubts about his ability to manage at senior level.

"Brian will ensure football thrives across the country, his interest won't be in playing golf and opening pubs."

— Then-Bohemians manager Stephen Kenny, expressing his admiration for Kerr.

Kerr faced a daunting challenge. His brief to take Ireland to the European Championships was compromised by the fact that the opening defeats left the team at the bottom of Group 10. The first competitive match of Kerr's tenure took place on 29 March 2003 in what would turn out to be a tempestuous game in Dublin versus Georgia. Ireland won the match 2–1, a Gary Doherty goal six minutes from time securing the three points, but The Observer lamented "disgraceful scenes" as several Irish players were struck by missiles hurled from the crowd. No serious injuries were incurred and Ireland's campaign had its first win.

Five days later the side travelled to Tirana to meet an Albania side that, although they had just recorded a historic win against group leaders Russia, were considered beatable opponents. In a game of few chances, Ireland failed to build on the momentum generated by the Georgia result and the game finished 0–0.

On 7 June 2003, in Kerr's first competitive home match, Ireland welcomed Albania in the return fixture. Ireland secured a 2–1 win thanks to an injury time own goal from Albania's veteran defender Adrian Aliaj but they were deemed fortunate to emerge as winners given that Albania appeared the more technically accomplished side with their midfield often outnumbering that of the visitors. Nevertheless, the three points were Ireland's and after Switzerland and Russia drew their match in Basel there was renewed optimism that Ireland could qualify and even top the group. Further evidence that Kerr was initiating a remarkable turnaround in form was provided by the 2–0 victory over Georgia at Lansdowne Road on 11 June 2003. Even though the team were deprived of star player Damien Duff through injury, Ireland turned in an aggressive and compact performance based on thwarting the away side's more technical style and ensured victory via goals from Gary Doherty and Robbie Keane. Russia remained in pole position in the group but Ireland now had 10 points out of 12 under Kerr and had given themselves a fair chance of qualifying if positive results could be gained from the upcoming ties.

Russia arrived in Dublin for the 6 September clash with three points fewer than Ireland but with a game in hand. Anything less than a victory would be a serious blow to Ireland's qualification hopes. Damien Duff produced a moment of inspiration to fire Ireland into the lead after 36 minutes. The Chelsea forward embarked on a slaloming run past three challenges before unleashing a 25-yard shot that deflected in off Victor Onopko. However seven minutes later the scores were level after Ireland goalkeeper Shay Given failed to collect a corner which allowed Sergei Ignashevich to steal in and divert the ball home from ten yards. Russia's tactics effectively nullified Ireland - from whom Damien Duff proved the only credible attacking outlet - and the game finished level with Kerr's tactics drawing some criticism afterwards for lacking creativity and an over-reliance on Duff to provide the inspiration necessary for unlocking defenses. Ireland remained second but the games in hand enjoyed by both Switzerland and Russia over them meant that a win away in Basel was vital if Ireland were to have any chance of qualifying. In the final game of the campaign, Ireland went down 2–0 due to goals from Hakan Yakin and Alexander Frei. The Swiss topped the group and qualified automatically. Russia's emphatic 4–1 win over the Swiss the previous month and then their 3–1 win at home to Georgia saw them secure the play-off spot. Ireland would not be going to the European Championships in Portugal.

Despite the disappointment in failing to qualify, hopes remained high that Kerr would be able to lead the Irish team to the 2006 World Cup in Germany. Ireland were drawn in UEFA Group 4 - once again alongside Switzerland - but also with the formidable challenge presented by the 1998 World Champions France, with Israel, Cyprus and Faroe Islands rounding out the group. On 4 September 2004, the campaign got off to a positive start with a 3–0 home win over Cyprus, Clinton Morrison, Andy Reid and Robbie Keane the scorers. Four days later, Ireland returned to the scene of their previous campaign's elimination as they took on Switzerland in Basel. This time they were able to claim a 1–1 draw after Clinton Morrison opened the scoring with Hakan Yakin restoring parity for the home side.

Ireland's daunting away trip to France was next, on 9 October, but injuries and suspensions had deprived the French team of a core of their strongest players - Zinedine Zidane, Patrick Vieira and Claude Makélélé among them - raising the possibility of an Irish victory. Boosted by the end of Roy Keane's international exile, Ireland turned in a committed and disciplined performance and emerged with a deserved point in a match that finished 0–0 with the French evidently still suffering from their poor performance at that Summer's European Championship. The result was received well but Damien Duff remarked that on the balance of play Ireland could, and perhaps should, have collected all three points. Five days later, this was followed by a 2–0 win over group minnows Faroe Islands at Lansdowne Road - a match in which Robbie Keane finally broke Niall Quinn's record of 19 international goals but otherwise was characterised by poor Irish finishing.

At the next international break, on 26 March 2005, Ireland would take on Israel in Tel Aviv. Clinton Morrison put Ireland in front two minutes before the interval but, in what would result in the first serious criticism of Kerr's reign, Ireland then stood off their opponents in the second half and allowed Israel to regain a foothold in the game. Abbas Souan's last-minute equaliser ensured the game finished 1–1 and Ireland had dropped two extremely valuable points. But it was in the return fixture in June of that year that saw Ireland's hopes for qualification take a serious blow and that some retrospectively remarked was the turning point for Kerr. After racing into a 2–0 lead thanks to goals from Ian Harte and Robbie Keane, Ireland again eased off and allowed the Israelis back into the game. Avi Yehiel and Avi Nimni equalised before half-time and the result finished 2–2. The result was described as "devastating" by the Irish team and it now placed additional pressure on securing home wins against Switzerland and, ominously, France if qualification was to be assured. A routine 2–0 win away to the Faroes four days later did little to lift hopes.

On 7 September 2005, Ireland welcomed France to Lansdowne Road. France were now a different proposition to the side that had drawn with Ireland in Paris the previous year and could now welcome back their first-choice players who had missed that game. Ireland produced a battling performance but, after 70 minutes and with the home side seemingly having run out of attacking ideas, they were powerless to prevent Thierry Henry's wonder strike which curled past Given from 25 yards out. The result was a massive blow to Ireland's qualification hopes and they now had to hope to win their remaining games - away to Cyprus and at home to Switzerland - while hoping other results went their way.

Cyprus were dispatched 1–0 after an early goal from Stephen Elliott but in the home game against Switzerland, with qualification still a possibility, Ireland produced few chances. With 25 minutes remaining Kerr withdrew Robbie Keane - by now the country's record goalscorer - and the in-form Clinton Morrison, replacing them with Stephen Elliott and Gary Doherty. The gamble failed and the game finished 0–0. Ireland had again failed to qualify for a major tournament under Kerr.

Kerr faced vocal criticism from pundits for his conservative approach and rumours that Damien Duff was not happy with the manager's tactics. Kerr was now out of contract and speculation emerged as to the merits of awarding him a renewal. Not long after the end of the qualification campaign, Kerr appeared on Irish television in an interview in which some observers said effectively mounted to him issuing a public plea for a new contract. It was to no avail as the FAI announced on 18 October 2005 that they would not continue with Kerr. Despite the fact that the team had lost only once in qualification, Kerr's record of one defeat, five draws and just four wins had signaled the end of his tenure as Ireland manager. He was replaced by Steve Staunton.

== St. Patrick's Athletic Director of Football ==
In March 2007, Kerr returned to St. Patrick's Athletic football club, this time taking a position as Director of Football, a role to which he was appointed by new club owner Garrett Kelleher. His duties at the club included technical support to the management team, as well as scouting of youth players. On 19 May 2008, Kerr announced his resignation from his role as director of football at St Pat's with immediate effect. Despite being strongly linked with a vacant managerial position at Cork City a number of months later, a return to Irish club management for Kerr was not to materialise.

== Coach of Faroe Islands ==
On 6 April 2009, Kerr was confirmed as head coach of the Faroe Islands national football team. He stated on the Irish talk show Tubridy Tonight that the Faroese language was '50% Norsk Bokmal, 50% Gaeilge'.

His first game as manager was on 10 June 2009 against Serbia in Tórshavn, in which they lost 2–0. Apart from four players who played full-time in Denmark and another in Iceland, the rest of Kerr's 22-man squad was made up of part-time players who were either working or studying.

"We have four carpenters, at least six full-time students – one of them had to fly to Copenhagen and back for an exam this week – two policemen, an accountant, one fella works in a sports shop, two teachers, Andreas works in a bowling alley, and he's doing a bit of carpentry as well. Simun is full-time in Iceland, Suni works in a fish factory, I think Frodi's a builder, Jakup is a teacher but he's on the town council as well, he's like a TD. That's kind of the run of it. The pool is quite limited, there's no one at Milan we've missed out on. The Granny Rule isn't much help either, the Faroese haven't been huge at emigration."

— Kerr's assessment of the Faroes squad.

On 9 September 2009, the Faroe Islands won 2–1 against Lithuania in a 2010 World Cup qualifying game, their first World Cup qualifying win since September 2001. On 17 November 2009, a documentary aired on RTÉ called Away with the Faroes, about Kerr taking over as the Faroes boss.

On 12 October 2010, the Faroe Islands drew 1–1 against Northern Ireland in a UEFA Euro 2012 qualifier for their first point of the qualifying campaign. This point was built upon with a 2–0 win over Estonia on 7 June 2011, a first Euro qualifier win for the Faroes since their 1995 victory over San Marino. The win still left Faroe Islands bottom of the table, but with 4 points. On 26 October 2011, Kerr stepped down as coach of the Faroese national team, after the Faroe Islands Football Association (FSF) announced that "it was not possible to agree a new contract with Brian Kerr". "I gave it the best I could and I spent a lot of time away. I'm happy enough that we moved forward in the last three years and we had some very special days", he said on leaving.

== Other work ==
Kerr turned his attention to television as a studio analyst and co-commentator for RTÉ Sport. On 21 August 2016, while commenting on the Burnley vs Liverpool match, he stated the following: "I must say about Klavan, they surprised me when they signed him. He plays for Estonia, he has about 120 caps. He played against the Faroes when I was in the Faroes and I remember studying him before the match and thinking he was a bit of a weak link. I never thought he was a fella who would be playing for Liverpool in the Premier League. Maybe my judgement wasn't very good but we got three goals against him with the Faroes." This was confirmed to be untrue by the Estonian FA who replied to Kerr's allegations stating many inaccuracies as Klavan was not involved in the suggested game. Kerr works as a studio analyst for matches shown on Virgin Media Sport.

== Activism ==
In 2016, Kerr was one of two Irish sportspeople along with Timmy Hammersley to put his name to an open letter protesting Bank of Ireland's decision to shut down the accounts of the Ireland Palestine Solidarity Campaign.

In May 2026, he joined several high-profile figures in signing an open letter to the Football Association of Ireland (FAI), calling for a boycott of matches against Israel due to the humanitarian crisis in Palestine.

| Preceded by Jimmy Jackson | St Patrick's Athletic manager 1986 - 1996 | Succeeded by Pat Dolan |

| Preceded by Mick McCarthy | Republic of Ireland manager 2003 - 2005 | Succeeded by Steve Staunton |

| Preceded by Jógvan Martin Olsen | Faroe Islands manager 2009 - 2011 | Succeeded by Lars Olsen |
