= 2005 FAI Cup final =

- Event: 2005 FAI Cup
Drogheda United	Cork City
2	0
- Date: 4 December 2005
- Venue: Lansdowne Road, Dublin
- Man of the Match: Gavin Whelan (Drogheda United)
- Referee: Ian Stokes
- Attendance: 24,521

The 2005 FAI Cup final was the final match of the 2005 FAI Cup. The final took place on 4 December 2005 at Lansdowne Road, Dublin in front of a crowd of 24,521 and a television audience which peaked at 285,000. This was the largest attendance at an FAI Cup Final since 1990. The match was originally due to take place at Tolka Park, Dublin however the match was moved to Lansdowne Road in order to accommodate a larger crowd. Drogheda United and Cork City contested the final. Drogheda United were generally seen as underdogs coming into the game but they successfully claimed their first major trophy by winning the match. It was Cork City's first appearance in the final since 1998. Drogheda United last contested the final in 1976. Live coverage of the match was provided on RTÉ Two and RTÉ Radio 1.

== Route to the final ==
=== Drogheda United ===
Round	Opposition	Score
2nd	Limerick (h)	2-0
3rd	Dundalk (a)	2-0
Quarter-finals	Bohemians (h)	2-1
Semi-finals	Bray Wanderers (h)	2-1

Drogheda United entered the competition in the second round along with the other 21 League of Ireland clubs. They did not play against any junior/intermediate teams en route to the final. Their first match was against First Division Limerick FC. Drogheda won the match 2-0, despite threatening play by Limerick, with both goals coming in the second half. Drogheda were drawn away to Dundalk in the third round, however there was some uncertainty regarding the venue for the match. Oriel Park, home of Dundalk, was under development leading up to the game and there was a possibility that the work would not be completed on time. Had this been the case, the match would have been switched to Drogheda's stadium. The match went ahead at Oriel Park, with Drogheda as victors after goals from Mark Leech and Damian Lynch either side of half-time.

At the quarter-final stage, Drogheda were drawn against Bohemians. They won the game 2-1, and in doing so, reached the semi-finals of the competition for the second successive year. Paul Keegan opened the scoring after 2 minutes, with Damian Lynch adding a second after his initial penalty was saved. Bohemians pulled a goal back through Aidan O'Keeffe after the goalscorer, Keegan, was sent off shortly after half-time, but it proved to only be a consolation. Bohemians also had a player sent off towards the end of the game. A 2-1 home semi-final victory over Bray Wanderers sent Drogheda into their first FAI Cup Final since 1976. Declan O'Brien opened the scoring in the first half. Jermaine Sandvliet put Drogheda 2-0 up in the second half, only for Bray Wanderers to score 2 minutes later. Despite this setback, Drogheda held on to reach the final.

=== Cork City ===
Round	Opposition	Score
2nd	Galway United (a)	0-0
2nd	Galway United (h)	1-0
3rd	Finn Harps (h)	0-0
3rd	Finn Harps (a)	3-2
Quarter-finals	Sligo Rovers	3-1
Semi-finals	Derry City	1-0

Cork City also entered the competition at the second round and did not play against any junior/intermediate sides en route to the final. They required a replay to overcome Galway United in the second round. The first tie, despite finishing 0-0, was dominated by Galway United, who were in the league below Cork City. Cork City had home advantage in the replay and went on to win the game 1-0. The match did not pass without incident however, as the winning goal, a penalty, was deemed controversial by the away side.

Despite having home advantage, Cork City could only manage a 0-0 draw against Finn Harps in the third round. The required replay was not ideal for Cork City as they had qualified for the UEFA Cup, which meant that fixture congestion was a possible problem. Extra-time was required to separate the two sides in the replay. Cork City scored first through Liam Kearney but Finn Harps had taken the lead by the 72nd minute through goals from Eloka Asokuh and Chris Breen. John O'Flynn scored for Cork City in the final few minutes to force extra-time. Roy O'Donovan scored the decisive goal 2 minutes from the end of extra-time.

Cork City were drawn at home to Sligo Rovers in the quarter-finals. With the match standing at 1-1, Sligo Rovers forward Kupono Low was dismissed. Cork City capitalised on the dismissal by scoring two further goals. The final score was 3-1. This result set up a semi-final against Derry City. With 90 minutes played, the scoreline remained 0-0 and a replay seemed likely. However, in the second minute of injury time, Derry City substitute Stephen O'Flynn fouled Neale Fenn in the penalty area. The referee awarded a penalty, which was scored by George O'Callaghan to send Cork City into the final.

== Pre-match ==
Drogheda United were appearing in the final for the 3rd time, having lost the previous two finals they had contested (in 1976 and 1971). Cork had won the competition once previously, in 1998 and had been runners-up on two occasions, (in 1992 and 1989). Cork City went into the game as League of Ireland champions so they were in contention for the double.

The venue for the 2005 final was changed leading up to the match. Initially, the match was due to be played at Tolka Park, a stadium with a 9,500 capacity. However, as demand for tickets was expected to exceed the capacity of the stadium after Drogheda United's win over Bray Wanderers, the Football Association of Ireland considered alternative venues. Lansdowne Road was announced as the venue for the final, although the north terrace of the stadium was closed due to fire damage.

== Match ==
Cork City players Danny Murphy and Roy O'Donovan were suspended for the final after both were booked in a league match against Waterford United. Alan Bennett also received a yellow card in the match, which meant he, too, was to be suspended for the cup final through receiving a one-match ban. Cork City appealed the decision on the grounds that the wrong player had been booked. Television footage appeared to confirm this, so the ban was overturned.

=== Report ===
Neither side dominated a tense first half which included only one chance of note - John O'Flynn nearly gave Cork City the lead in the 17th minute when his low shot hit the post. Cold and windy weather had a negative impact on the quality of football played. Drogheda United did manage to gain a foothold in the game, however, as they took the lead in the 52nd minute. Declan O'Brien challenged for a cross from the right and the ball broke to Gavin Whelan who scored from close range. Both sides created further chances, but it was Drogheda who scored the next, and final, goal as O'Brien lobbed the Cork keeper from 18 yards to seal the win.

=== Details ===
4 December 2005
15:15 BST

Drogheda United	2 – 0	Cork City
G. Whelan 52'; D. O'Brien 83'	Match report

Lansdowne Road
Attendance: 24,521

Drogheda United	Cork City

GK	1	(Republic of Ireland) Dan Connor
RB	2	(Republic of Ireland) Damian Lynch	(yellow card) 79'
CB	6	(Republic of Ireland) Graham Gartland
CB	5	(Republic of Ireland) Steven Gray
LB	3	(Republic of Ireland) Simon Webb
RM	7	(Republic of Ireland) Shane Robinson
CM	4	(Republic of Ireland) Gavin Whelan		52'
CM	8	(Republic of Ireland) Stephen Bradley	(substituted off) 71'
LM	11	(Netherlands) Jermaine Sandvliet
ST	9	(Republic of Ireland) Declan O'Brien (c)	83'	(substituted off) 90+3'
ST	19	(Finland) Sami Ristila	(yellow card) 67'	(substituted off) 77'
Substitutes:
ST	10	(Republic of Ireland) Mark Leech
CM	18	(Republic of Ireland) Paul Keegan	(substituted on) 71'
ST	?	(Republic of Ireland) Mark Rooney	(substituted on) 77'
CM	?	(Scotland) Paul Bernard	(substituted on) 90+3'
GK	?	(Republic of Ireland) Gary Rogers
RB	?	(Republic of Ireland) Patrick Sullivan
CB	?	(Scotland) Stuart Malcolm
Manager:
(Republic of Ireland) Paul Doolin

GK	1	(Republic of Ireland) Michael Devine
RB	?	(United States) Neal Horgan
CB	?	(England) Dan Murray	(yellow card) 29'
CB	3	(Republic of Ireland) Alan Bennett
LB	11	(Republic of Ireland) Billy Woods
RM	8	(Republic of Ireland) Neale Fenn	(substituted off) 63'
CM	?	(Republic of Ireland) Joe Gamble
CM	?	(Republic of Ireland) Greg O'Halloran (c)	(substituted off) 83'
LM	30	(Republic of Ireland) Liam Kearney
AM	10	(Republic of Ireland) George O'Callaghan	(yellow card) 27'
ST	9	(Republic of Ireland) John O'Flynn
Substitutes:
ST	?	(Republic of Ireland) Denis Behan	(substituted on) 63'
RM	7	(Republic of Ireland) Colin O’Brien	(substituted on) 83'
Manager:
(Republic of Ireland) Damien Richardson

== Post-match ==
In an interview with the Irish Independent after the match, Cork City manager Damien Richardson was critical of the playing surface at Lansdowne Road, particularly as three rugby internationals had recently been played at the stadium. He added that he would like to see the cup final played earlier in the year.
