= 2007 FAI Cup final =

- Event: 2007 FAI Cup
Cork City	Longford Town
1	0
- Date: 2 December 2007
- Venue: RDS Arena, Dublin
- Referee: Dave McKeon

The 2007 FAI Cup final was the final match of the 2007 FAI Cup, the national association football cup of the Republic of Ireland. Cork City and Longford Town contested the final, which was played at the RDS Arena in Dublin as Lansdowne Road, the usual venue for the final, was under re-development. Much of the build-up to the game was dominated by the events at Cork City, where many of the squad were out of contract and were seemingly not going to be offered new deals. Cork won the game 1–0 by virtue of a goal from Denis Behan. Despite his side's victory, Cork manager Damien Richardson left the club a few weeks later and was replaced by Longford manager Alan Mathews.

== Route to the final ==
Both clubs entered the competition at the second round, alongside all of the other League of Ireland clubs, and completed four ties before reaching the final. Cork City played solely League of Ireland opposition, whereas Longford Town were drawn against two non-league sides.

=== Cork City ===
Round	Opposition	Score
2nd	Shelbourne (a)	0-1
3rd	Kilkenny City (h)	5-1
Quarter-finals	Waterford United (a)	1-1
Quarter-finals	Waterford United (h)	4-0
Semi-finals	Bohemians (a)	0-2

Cork City began the competition against First Division side Shelbourne. Cork City won the game 1–0; Roy O'Donovan's penalty in the 8th minute being the only goal of the game. O'Donovan won the penalty himself after a foul from Conor Rafferty. The third round match against Kilkenny City finished 5–1 to Cork. Cork players Brian O'Callaghan, Leon McSweeney and Colin Healy all scored in a 6-minute period in the first half to put the home side 3-0 up. Although Kilkenny did pull a goal back, John O'Flynn scored two goals towards the end of the second half to seal a comfortable win. Cork City required a replay to advance past the quarter-finals after initially drawing 1–1 against Waterford United. Waterford took the lead on 10 minutes through Dave Warren's free kick and they could have doubled their lead but for Alan Kearney's goal being ruled out on 28 minutes. Cork equalised early in the second half through Denis Behan but nearly fell behind again after Vinnie Sullivan hit the woodwork. The replay was not such a close encounter as Cork, this time playing at home, comfortably won 4–0. Denis Behan scored a hat-trick. with Liam Kearney scoring the other goal. Bohemians were the opposition in the semi-final. Although they were the away side, Cork guaranteed their place in final by winning 2–0. Liam Kearney scored both the goals.

=== Longford Town ===
Round	Opposition	Score
2nd	Celbridge Town (h)	1-0
3rd	Fanad United (h)	2-0
Quarter-finals	Limerick 37 (h)	3-1
Semi-finals	UCD (a)	0-1

Longford Town faced Celbridge Town of the Leinster Senior League in their first tie. Longford won the game 1–0. Longford again faced non-League of Ireland opposition in the third round as they played Fanad United at home. Fanad United were in close-season and this handicap proved too much for them as they lost 1–0 to Longford. Limerick 37 were the opposition in the quarter-finals. The match finished 3–1 in Longford's favour, although much of the action happened late in the game as Longford opened the scoring in the 72nd minute. Dave Mooney doubled Longford's advantage in the 81st minute before Limerick converted a penalty, although Jamie Duffy scored in the final minute of the match to ensure Longford's progression. Longford then reached the final after a 1–0 win over UCD. Robbie Martin, a former UCD player, scored the winning goal.

== Pre-match ==
Longford Town were appearing the final for the fourth time in seven years having won the tournament in 2004 and 2003 and finishing as runners-up in 2001, despite never contesting a FAI Cup final before 2001. Cork City's last appearance in the final was in 2005, when they lost to Drogheda United. Cork had also previously contested the FAI Cup final in 1989 and 1998, winning on the latter occasion.

Colm James and Ian Ryan were cup-tied for Longford, while David Freeman was also absent due to illness. Cork's only absentee through injury was Darragh Ryan, although Liam Kearney, John O’Flynn and Brian O’Callaghan had themselves all recently returned from injury. Cork's Neal Horgan and Gary Deegan of Longford were suspended for the final. Both clubs attempted to persuade the FAI to postpone their suspensions on compassionate grounds, but the appeals were ultimately unsuccessful.

Longford went into the match having already been relegated from the League of Ireland Premier Division. Cork had finished 4th in the league and were generally regarded as favourites going into the cup final.

A minute's silence was held before the game in memory of Longford Town club president Peter Keenan who had died that week.

=== Cork City contract situation ===
Many Cork City players were out of contract going into the match, a situation that had "unsettled" the players according to manager Damien Richardson. Richardson's own future at the club was also unresolved.

=== Distribution of revenue ===
In a statement released before the club's final league match of the season, Cork City threatened to pull out of the final over a disagreement about the distribution of the revenue generated by the final between the participating teams. Traditionally, the FAI would take 40% of the revenue and the participating clubs would split the remaining money after running costs had been deducted. This year, the FAI had proposed that the winners would receive a minimum of €100,000 in prize money and the runners-up would receive a minimum payment of €75,000, which the organisation claimed was a substantial increase on the previous year's figures. The FAI also claimed that representatives of Cork City and Longford Town, along with representatives of the other semi-finalists UCD and Bohemians, had been informed of, and agreed to, this financial package.

== Match ==
Lansdowne Road, the usual venue for the cup final, was under re-development so the match was held at the RDS Arena in Dublin. The weather was very poor, with Cork City beginning the match playing against the wind. Longford, despite widely being considered underdogs, were the better side in the first thirty minutes and had several opportunities of note, in particular Jamie Duffy's effort on 15 minutes which Michael Devine did well to save. Cork's first clear-cut chance came after 30 minutes following a mistake in the Longford defence.

Longford had to play against the wind in the second half and this coincided with Cork becoming more dominant in the game. Billy Woods' free kick early in the half eluded everyone and the ball went just wide. The only goal of the game came in the 60th minute - John O'Flynn received the ball on the left wing from Dan Murray and delivered a cross into the penalty area which Denis Behan met with a diving header. Behan had the opportunity to double his side's advantage in the 80th minute but could only hit the crossbar, as did O'Flynn three minutes later. Longford's defeat was effectively sealed in the final few minutes of the match when Patrick Sullivan was sent off following a poor tackle.

Cork City	Longford Town

=== Match details ===
2 December 2007
15:30

Cork City	1 – 0	Longford Town
D. Behan 60'	Match report

RDS Arena

Cork City:
(Republic of Ireland) Michael Devine
(Republic of Ireland) Cillian Lordan
(Republic of Ireland) Brian O'Callaghan
(England) Dan Murray
(Republic of Ireland) Billy Woods	(substituted off) 67'
(Republic of Ireland) Leon McSweeney
(Republic of Ireland) Joe Gamble
(Republic of Ireland) Colin Healy
(Republic of Ireland) Liam Kearney	(substituted off) 85'
(Republic of Ireland) Denis Behan
(Republic of Ireland) John O'Flynn
Substitutes:
(Republic of Ireland) Colin O'Brien	(substituted on) 67'
(Republic of Ireland) Gareth Farrelly	(substituted on) 85'
Manager: Damien Richardson

Longford Town:
(Republic of Ireland) Seamus Kelly
(Republic of Ireland) Patrick Sullivan	(yellow card) 90+3' (yellow-red card)
(Republic of Ireland) Damien Brennan
(Republic of Ireland) Kevin Doherty
(Republic of Ireland) Sean Prunty
Jamie Duffy		(substituted off) 78'
(Republic of Ireland) Daire Doyle
(England) Mark Rutherford
(Republic of Ireland) Robbie Martin
(Republic of Ireland) Dave Mooney
(Republic of Ireland) Dessie Baker		(substituted off) 55'
Substitutes:
(Republic of Ireland) John Reilly		(substituted on) 78'
(United States) Ian Wexler		(substituted on) 55'
Manager: Alan Mathews

MATCH OFFICIALS

- Referee: Dave McKeon

MATCH RULES

- 90 minutes.
- 30 minutes of extra-time if necessary.
- Penalty shoot-out if scores still level.
- Seven named substitutes
- Maximum of 3 substitutions.

== Post-match ==
In an interview with RTÉ on the pitch following the game, Cork captain Dan Murray controversially claimed his side's victory was "two fingers to the board".

Cork City manager Damien Richardson left the club a couple of weeks after the final and was replaced by Alan Mathews, who had managed Longford Town in this final.

Cork City qualified for the UEFA Cup and Setanta Cup by winning the match.
