= 2006 Setanta Sports Cup =

Tournament details
- Country: Northern Ireland; Republic of Ireland
- Teams: 8

Final positions
- Champions: Drogheda United (1st title)
- Runners-up: Cork City

Tournament statistics
- Matches played: 27
- Goals scored: 59 (2.19 per match)

The 2006 Setanta Sports Cup was the 2nd staging of the Setanta Sports Cup, a cross-border cup competition that takes place between football clubs from the Republic of Ireland and Northern Ireland. The final was played at Tolka Park in Dublin, Republic of Ireland on 22 April 2006, where Drogheda United beat Cork City to win the competition for the first time.

== Group stage ==
The draw for this round was held 12 December 2005. The matches were played 20 February 2006 – 3 April 2006.

=== Group A ===
Pos	Team	Pld	W	D	L	GF	GA	GD	Pts	Qualification
1	(Republic of Ireland) Cork City (A)	6	5	1	0	11	2	+9	16	Advanced to the semi-finals
2	(Republic of Ireland) Drogheda Utd (A)	6	3	1	2	7	5	+2	10	Advanced to the semi-finals
3	(Northern Ireland) Dungannon Swifts	6	1	1	4	4	8	−4	4	
4	(Northern Ireland) Portadown	6	0	3	3	4	11	−7	3	

(A) Advance to a further round
2006-02-20

Drogheda United	1 – 0	Dungannon Swifts
Leech 43'	(Report)

United Park, Drogheda

2006-02-20

Portadown	1 – 1	Cork City
Kelly 45'	(Report)	O'Flynn 21'

Shamrock Park, Portadown

2006-02-27

Cork City	2 – 0	Drogheda United
Behan 58'; Gavin o.g. 80'	(Report)	Bradley (red card) 76'; Fahey (red card) 77'

Turners Cross, Cork
Referee: (Republic of Ireland) Alan Kelly

2006-02-27

Dungannon Swifts	1 – 1	Portadown
McAree 85' (pen.)	(Report)	Convery 23'

Stangmore Park, Dungannon

2006-03-06

Cork City	2 – 0	Dungannon Swifts
O'Flynn 39'; O'Callaghan 47'; O'Donovan (red card) 28'	(Report)

Turners Cross, Cork

2006-03-06

Portadown	0 – 0	Drogheda United
	(Report)

Shamrock Park, Portadown

2006-03-14

Drogheda United	4 – 0	Portadown
Keegan 7'; Barrett 9'; O'Brien 33', 55'	(Report)	Neill (red card) 69'

United Park, Drogheda

2006-03-14

Dungannon Swifts	0 – 1	Cork City
	(Report)	Behan 52'

Stangmore Park, Dungannon

2006-03-21

Cork City	3 – 1	Portadown
Woods 2'; Behan 70'; O'Callaghan 90'	(Report)	Quinn 72'

Turners Cross, Cork

2006-03-21

Dungannon Swifts	1 – 2	Drogheda United
Scullion 74'	(Report)	O'Brien 9'; Bradley 59'

Stangmore Park, Dungannon

2006-03-27

Drogheda United	0 – 2	Cork City
Connor (red card) 78'	(Report)	Behan 13'; O'Callaghan 79' (pen.)

United Park, Drogheda

2006-03-27

Portadown	1 – 2	Dungannon Swifts
McStay 86'	(Report)	Adamson 74'; Bulow 84'

Shamrock Park, Portadown

=== Group B ===
Pos	Team	Pld	W	D	L	GF	GA	GD	Pts	Qualification
1	(Northern Ireland) Linfield (A)	6	2	4	0	12	4	+8	10	Advanced to the semi-finals
2	(Republic of Ireland) Shelbourne (A)	6	2	3	1	7	3	+4	9	Advanced to the semi-finals
3	(Republic of Ireland) Derry City	6	1	4	1	5	4	+1	7	
4	(Northern Ireland) Glentoran	6	1	1	4	5	18	−13	4	

(A) Advance to a further round
2006-02-20

Linfield	1 – 1	Derry City
Thompson 9'	(Report)	Farren 16'

Windsor Park, Belfast

2006-02-20

Shelbourne	3 – 0	Glentoran
Ryan 29'; Crowe 36', 60'	(Report)

Tolka Park, Dublin

2006-02-28

Derry City	0 – 0	Shelbourne
	(Report)

Brandywell, Derry

2006-02-28

Glentoran	3 – 3	Linfield
Lockhart 11'; Nixon 21' (pen.); Browne 74'	(Report)	McAreavey 17'; Kearney 50', 69'; Ferguson (red card) 57'

The Oval, Belfast

2006-03-13

Derry City	3 – 1	Glentoran
Hargan 11', 35'; Beckett 38'	(Report)	Walker 90'

Brandywell, Derry

2006-03-13

Linfield	2 – 0	Shelbourne
Gault 35'; Thompson 53'	(Report)

Windsor Park, Belfast

2006-03-20

Glentoran	1 – 0	Derry City
Reed 8'	(Report)	Hargan (red card) 41'

The Oval, Belfast

2006-03-20

Shelbourne	0 – 0	Linfield
Hawkins (red card) 75'	(Report)	McAreavey (red card) 24'

Tolka Park, Dublin
Referee: (Republic of Ireland) Alan Kelly

2006-03-27

Derry City	0 – 0	Linfield
	(Report)

Brandywell, Derry

2006-03-27

Glentoran	0 – 3	Shelbourne
	(Report)	Byrne 17', 68'; Cahill 30'

The Oval, Belfast

2006-04-03

Shelbourne	1 – 1	Derry City
Byrne 17'	(Report)	Martyn 89'

Tolka Park, Dublin

2006-04-03

Linfield	6 – 0	Glentoran
Hunter 25' (pen.); Thompson 41', 90'; McAreavey 56', 82'; Murphy 62'	(Report)	Glendinning (red card) 40'

Windsor Park, Belfast

== Semi-finals ==
The draw for the semi-finals was made by drawing the winners of Group A against the runners-up of Group B and vice versa, with group winners having home advantage. There would be no replays if the matches were drawn; instead, extra time would decide winners immediately thereafter. If extra time did not decide the winners, a set of five alternating penalty kicks would decide winners.

10 April 2006
20:05 IST

Cork City	2 – 0	Shelbourne
O'Brien 34'; Fenn 62'	(Report)

Turners Cross, Cork

11 April 2006
20:05 IST

Linfield	0 – 1	Drogheda United
	(Report)	Keddy 33'

Windsor Park, Belfast

== Final ==
Similarly to the semi-finals, there would be no replay even if the match was drawn; instead, extra time would be used to decide the winners. If extra time failed to separate the two sides, the match would go to penalties.

22 April 2006
17:00 IST

Cork City	0 – 1 (AET)	Drogheda United
	(Report)	Leech 102'

Tolka Park, Dublin

Winner of 2006 Setanta Sports Cup

1st title

== Goalscorers ==
4 goals

- (Republic of Ireland) Denis Behan (Cork City)
- (Northern Ireland) Peter Thompson (Linfield)

3 goals

- (Republic of Ireland) Jason Byrne (Shelbourne)
- (Republic of Ireland) George O'Callaghan (Cork City)
- (Northern Ireland) Paul McAreavey (Linfield)
- (Republic of Ireland) Declan O'Brien (Drogheda United)

2 goals

- (Republic of Ireland) Glen Crowe (Shelbourne)
- (Northern Ireland) Sean Hargan (Derry City)
- (Northern Ireland) Oran Kearney (Linfield)
- (Republic of Ireland) Mark Leech (Drogheda United)
- (Republic of Ireland) John O'Flynn (Cork City)

1 goal

- (Northern Ireland) Timmy Adamson (Dungannon Swifts)
- (Republic of Ireland) Shane Barrett (Drogheda United)
- (Republic of Ireland) Gary Beckett (Derry City)
- (Republic of Ireland) Stephen Bradley (Drogheda United)
- (Northern Ireland) Gary Browne (Glentoran)
- (United States) David Bulow (Dungannon Swifts)
- (Republic of Ireland) Ollie Cahill (Shelbourne)
- (Northern Ireland) John Convery (Portadown)
- (Republic of Ireland) Mark Farren (Derry City)
- (Republic of Ireland) Neale Fenn (Cork City)
- (Northern Ireland) Michael Gault (Linfield)
- (Northern Ireland) Andrew Hunter (Linfield)
- (Republic of Ireland) James Keddy (Drogheda United)
- (Republic of Ireland) Paul Keegan (Drogheda United)
- (Northern Ireland) Darren Kelly (Portadown)
- (Northern Ireland) Darren Lockhart (Glentoran)
- (Republic of Ireland) Ciarán Martyn (Derry City)
- (Northern Ireland) Rodney McAree (Dungannon Swifts)
- (Northern Ireland) Henry McStay (Portadown)
- (Northern Ireland) William Murphy (Linfield)
- (Northern Ireland) Colin Nixon (Glentoran)
- (Republic of Ireland) Colin O'Brien (Cork City)
- (Northern Ireland) Paddy Quinn (Portadown)
- (England) Jamie Reed (Glentoran)
- (Republic of Ireland) Bobby Ryan (Shelbourne)
- (Northern Ireland) David Scullion (Dungannon Swifts)
- (Northern Ireland) Chris Walker (Glentoran)
- (Republic of Ireland) Billy Woods (Cork City)

1 own goal

- (Republic of Ireland) Jason Gavin (Drogheda United)
