= FAI Cup Final =

Football match in Ireland

The FAI Cup Final, known recently as the Club Orange FAI Cup Final for sponsorship reasons, is an annual soccer match which is the last game in the Football Association of Ireland Challenge Cup. It is the culmination of a knock-out competition among clubs belonging to the Football Association of Ireland, generally competed for by clubs from the Republic of Ireland, although representatives from Northern Ireland (most notably Derry City) have competed and even won the Cup. Shelbourne, Bohemians and Derry City are the only clubs to win both the (Northern) Irish Cup and the FAI Cup, although Shelbourne and Bohemians only won it before partition, whilst Derry City remained in the Northern Irish league system until 1973, entering the League of Ireland in 1985.

The FAI Cup final was played at Dalymount Park until 1990, since when it has been played at several venues. The 2006 final was the last soccer game to be played at the old Lansdowne Road before it was redeveloped and rebranded the Aviva Stadium. It was contested between St Patrick's Athletic and Derry City, with Derry City winning 4-3 after extra time. The original FAI Cup was also retired after this game with a brand new version of the trophy used in the following seasons. The cup final has been held at the Aviva Stadium since 2010.

== List of results ==
=== Performance by club ===
Club	Winners	Runners-up	Winning Years
Shamrock Rovers	26	10	1925, 1929, 1930, 1931, 1932, 1933, 1936, 1940, 1944, 1945, 1948, 1955, 1956, 1962, 1964, 1965, 1966, 1967, 1968, 1969, 1978, 1985, 1986, 1987, 2019, 2025.
Dundalk	12	8	1942, 1949, 1952, 1958, 1977, 1979, 1981, 1988, 2002, 2015, 2018, 2020
Shelbourne	7	12	1939, 1960, 1963, 1993, 1996, 1997, 2000
Bohemians	7	9	1928, 1935, 1970, 1976, 1992, 2001, 2008
Derry City	7	6	1989, 1995, 2002, 2006, 2012, 2022 2026
St. Patrick's Athletic	5	8	1959, 1961, 2014, 2021, 2023
Sligo Rovers	5	6	1983, 1994, 2010, 2011, 2013
Drumcondra	5	4	1927, 1943, 1946, 1954, 1957
Cork City	4	5	1998, 2007, 2016, 2017
Waterford United	2	7	1937, 1980
Cork Athletic	2	3	1951, 1953
Drogheda United	2	3	2005, 2024
Limerick	2	3	1971, 1982
Cork/Fordsons	2	2	1926, 1934
Cork Hibernians	2	2	1972, 1973
Cork United	2	2	1941, 1947
Longford Town	2	2	2003, 2004
St. James's Gate	2	2	1922, 1938
Bray Wanderers	2	-	1990, 1999
Finn Harps	1	1	1974
Galway United	1	1	1991
Alton United	1	-	1923
Athlone Town	1	-	1924
Transport	1	-	1950
Home Farm	1	-	1975
UCD AFC	1	-	1984
Sporting Fingal	1	-	2009
Cork Celtic	-	2	-
Brideville	-	2	-
Dolphin	-	2	-
St. Francis	-	1	-

Notes:

- 1 Since 1985 when Derry City joined to the league.
- 2 Includes Waterford.
- 3 Includes Drogheda.
- 4 Includes Limerick United.

== List of Match Officials ==
Year	Referee	Assistant Referees	Fourth Official
2027	-	-	-
2026	Kevin O'Sullivan	Darragh Keegan, Darren Corcoran (Reserve - Sean Stephens)	Aaron O'Dowd
2025	Paul Norton	Richard Storey, David Connolly (Reserve - Fintan Butler)	Marc Lynch
2024	Rob Harvey	Allen Lynch, Emmett Dynan (Reserve - David Connolly)	Paul Norton
2023	Paul McLaughlin	Eoin Harte, Darren Carey (Reserve - Trevor Cotter)	Rob Harvey
2022	Damien MacGraith	Christopher Campbell, Brian Fenlon	Ben Connolly
2021	Robert Hennessy	Dermot Broughton, Michelle O'Neill	Damien MacGraith
2020	Rob Harvey	Alan Sherlock, Darren Corcoran (Reserve - Eoin Harte)	Sean Grant
2019	Derek Tomney	Robert Clarke, Darragh Keegan (AAR Graham Kelly & Paul Tuite)	Robert Hennessy
2018	Neil Doyle	Mark Gavin, Declan Toland (AAR Rob Harvey & Damien MacGraith)	Rob Rogers
2017	Paul McLaughlin	Robert Clarke, Wayne McDonnell (AAR Rob Hennessy & Ray Matthews)	Derek Tomney
2016	Rob Rogers	Allen Lynch, Emmett Dynan (AAR Tomás Connolly & Derek Tomney)	Tomás Connolly
2015	David McKeon	Dermot Broughton, Mark Gavin	Rob Rogers
2014	Padraigh Sutton	Ciaran Delaney, Wayne McDonnell	Paul McLaughlin
2013	Paul Tuite	Damien MacGraith, Michelle O'Neill	Derek Tomney
2012	Neil Doyle	Emmett Dynan, Robert Clarke	Damien Hancock
2011	Richie Winter	Mark Gavin, Dermot Broughton	Graham Kelly
2010	Tomás Connolly	Damien MacGraith, Wayne McDonnell	Padraigh Sutton
2009	Alan Kelly	Allen Lynch, Terence Moyne	Neil Doyle
2008	Anthony Buttimer	Eddie Foley, Ken Hennessy	Richie Winter
2007	David McKeon	Damien MacGraith, Fran Cunningham	Pat Whelan
2006	Damien Hancock	Ciaran Delaney, Marc Douglas	David McKeon
2005	Ian Stokes	Dave Wogan, JP Kelly	Declan Hanney
2004	John Feighery	Martin Moloney, Rhona Daly	Ian Stokes
2003	Alan Kelly	Eddie Foley, Barry McDonnell	Paul Tuite
2001-02	Paul McKeon		
2001	Hughie Byrne	Paul Deering, Joe O'Brien	Pat Whelan
1998	Gerard Perry	Tony Ryan, Paul Moyer	John Feighery
1994-95	Michael Tomney		
1987-88	John Spillane		
1983	Robert Finn	Liam Gavin, Sean Ware	Wilfred Wallace
1980-81	Paddy Mulhall		
1978-79	Paddy Daly (Dublin)		
1976-77	Noel Breen		
1957-58	Denis Howell (Birmingham)		
1951-52	C. Fletcher (Cheshire)		
1948-49	E. Roland		
1941-42	T. Dwyer		
1934-35	Mr Booth (Preston)		
1930-31 (Replay)	Mr H.N. Mee (Nottingham)		
1928-29	Mr Hull (Burnley)		
1927-28	Jean Langenus (Belgium)		
1926-27	Mr J.T. Howcroft (Bolton)		
1924-25	Mr Howcroft (Bradford)		
1921-22	M. Broderick (Athlone)		

== See also ==
- FAI Cup
