= 2006 FAI Cup final =

- Event: 2006 FAI Cup
Derry City	St Patrick's Athletic
4	3
- Date: 3 December 2006
- Venue: Lansdowne Road, Dublin
- Referee: Damien Hancock
- Attendance: 16,022

The 2006 FAI Cup final was a soccer match held at Lansdowne Road, Dublin on 3 December 2006 and was the final match of the 2006 FAI Cup competition. The match was the 83rd FAI Cup Final, and the last to be held at the old Lansdowne Road before it shut for redevelopment. It was also the last soccer match to be held at the old Lansdowne Road venue. The match was contested by Derry City and St Patrick's Athletic, with Derry City winning 4–3 after extra time. and it was the fourth time Derry City had won the trophy. Damien Hancock was the referee for the match, attended by a crowd of 16,022.

The winning team qualified for the 2007–08 UEFA Cup and the 2007 Setanta Sports Cup. The match was broadcast live on RTÉ Two.

In 2013, this final was voted as the Greatest Ever FAI Cup Final.

== Team news ==
Derry City were without suspended midfielder Ciarán Martyn. Their manager Stephen Kenny was returning from his exodus to Dunfermline Athletic. St Patrick's Athletic had central defender Darragh Maguire suspended and two players cup-tied, midfielder Keith Fahey and striker Mark Rooney. Michael Foley returned to partner Dave Mulcahy in the middle with veteran Mark Rutherford, in what was his eighth final, on the left. The team had not won the cup since 1961, losing the last five finals in which they have played, and had not beaten Derry since April 2003, 14 matches previously.

== Match details ==
3 December 2006

Derry City	4-3 (AET)	St Patrick's Athletic
M. Farren 25'; C. Delaney 84'; P. Hutton 106'; S. Brennan (OG) 109'	Match report	D. Mulcahy 19'; T. Molloy (pen) 74'; S. O'Connor 103'

15.15 - Lansdowne Road, Dublin
Attendance: 16,022
Referee: Damien Hancock

Derry City	St Patrick's Athletic

MATCH OFFICIALS

- Assistant referees:
  - Ciaran Delaney
  - Marc Douglas
- Fourth official: Dave McKeon

MATCH RULES

- 90 minutes.
- 30 minutes of extra-time if necessary.
- Penalty shoot-out if scores still level.
- ? named substitutes
- Maximum of 3 substitutions.
