= Sami Ristilä =

Finnish footballer and manager (born 1974)

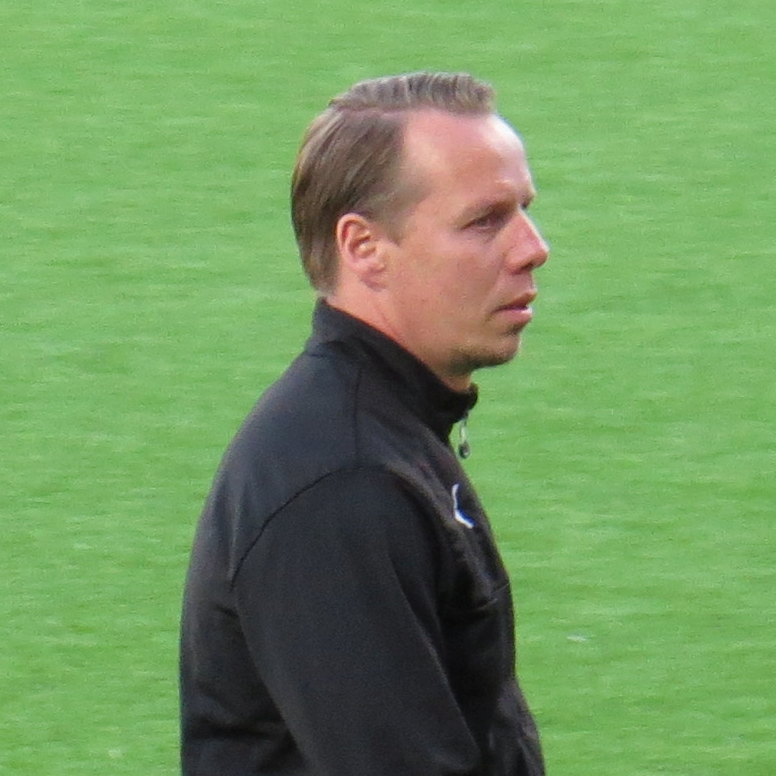
- Ristilä in 2015

Personal information
- Full name: Sami Ristilä
- Date of birth: 15 August 1974 (age 52)
- Place of birth: Valkeakoski, Finland
- Height: 1.79 m (5 ft 10 in)
- Position: Midfielder

Senior career*
Years	Team	Apps	(Gls)
1991–1995	Haka	87	(14)
1995–1996	Neukirchen	15	(3)
1996–1999	Zwolle	79	(17)
1999–2000	Jokerit	46	(9)
2001	MyPa	29	(6)
2002–2004	Haka	70	(25)
2005–2008	Drogheda United	64	(8)
2009	Haka	16	(2)
Total		396	(84)

International career
1992	Finland U21	1	(0)

Managerial career
- 2009–2012: Haka
- 2013–2016: KTP
- 2016: Shamrock Rovers (sporting director)
- 2018: Lahti (assistant)
- 2018–2019: Lahti
- * Club domestic league appearances and goals

Sami Ristilä (born 15 August 1974) is a Finnish football manager and former player.

== Playing career ==
Ristilä was born in Valkeakoski. Before he joined Drogheda Ristilä played for MyPa, SC Neukirchen, FC Zwolle and FC Haka. He played an important role in the Drogheda midfield and sometimes played up front. He has represented the Finland national side on two occasions. He played three seasons with Zwolle in the Dutch Eerste divisie. In December 2008 he returned to FC Haka and signed a contract to 30 December 2011.

He has played 247 games in the Veikkausliiga.

== Manager career ==
The longest spell of his career as a manager was 2013–2016 with Finnish club KTP. After 2015 season KTP got relegated from Veikkausliiga. Poor results continued the next year and Ristilä was replaced by his assistant coach in middle of the season on 30 June 2016.

On 31 August 2016, he joined the coaching staff of Shamrock Rovers under head coach Stephen Bradley, who he formerly played together with at Drogheda United. Sami would work with the development of the Shamrock Rovers Academy on a deal until the end of 2016.

In 2017, he returned to Finland and at the end of the year, he was appointed assistant coach to Toni Korkeakunnas at FC Lahti for the 2018 season with an option for one further year. He was also going to be responsible for the youth development from the U19s to the first team. On 8 October 2018, he was appointed head coach of Lahti, signing a deal until the end of 2020 with an option for one further year. The club announced in October 2019, that Ristilä would leave his position at the end of the year.

== Career statistics ==
As of 26 August 2024.

Appearances and goals by club, season and competition
Club	Season	League			Cup (Note: Includes Suomen Cup, KNVB Cup, FAI Cup)		League cup (Note: Includes League of Ireland Cup and Finnish League Cup)		Europe		Total	
Club	Season	Division	Apps	Goals	Apps	Goals	Apps	Goals	Apps	Goals	Apps	Goals
Haka	1991	Veikkausliiga	3	1	–		–		–		3	1
Haka	1992	Veikkausliiga	14	1	–		–		–		14	1
Haka	1993	Veikkausliiga	10	0	–		–		–		10	0
Haka	1994	Veikkausliiga	24	9	–		–		–		24	9
Haka	1995	Veikkausliiga	23	2	–		–		–		23	2
Haka	Total		74	13	0	0	0	0	0	0	74	13
Neukirchen	1995–96	Regionalliga Süd	15	3	–		–		–		15	3
Haka	1996	Veikkausliiga	13	1	0	0	–		4 (Note: Appearances in UEFA Cup)	2	17	3
Zwolle	1996–97	Eerste Divisie	26	8	2	1	–		–		28	9
Zwolle	1997–98	Eerste Divisie	28	4	1	1	–		–		29	5
Zwolle	1998–99	Eerste Divisie	29	5	2	0	–		–		31	5
Zwolle	Total		83	17	5	2	0	0	0	0	88	19
Jokerit	1999	Veikkausliiga	13	2	1	0	–		3 (Note: Appearances in UEFA Intertoto Cup)	0	17	2
Jokerit	2000	Veikkausliiga	32	7	0	0	–		2	0	34	7
Jokerit	Total		45	9	1	0	0	0	5	0	51	9
MYPA	2001	Veikkausliiga	29	6	0	0	–		2	0	31	6
Haka	2002	Veikkausliiga	21	5	1	1	–		2	1	24	7
Haka	2003	Veikkausliiga	23	10	0	0	–		1	1	24	11
Haka	2004	Veikkausliiga	26	10	0	0	–		4	2	30	12
Haka	Total		70	25	1	1	0	0	7	4	78	30
Drogheda United	2005	LOI Premier Division	25	3	4	0	–		–		29	3
Drogheda United	2006	LOI Premier Division	15	1	0	0	2	0	2	0	19	1
Drogheda United	2007	LOI Premier Division	12	3	1	0	0	0	3	0	16	3
Drogheda United	2008	LOI Premier Division	12	1	0	0	2	0	1 (Note: Appearance in UEFA Champions League)	0	15	1
Drogheda United	Total		64	8	5	0	4	0	6	0	79	8
Haka	2009	Veikkausliiga	16	2	0	0	4	1	–		20	3
Career total			409	84	12	3	8	1	22	6	451	94

== Honours ==
Haka

- Veikkausliiga (1): 2004

Drogheda United

- FAI Cup (1): 2005
- Setanta Sports Cup (2): 2006, 2007
- League of Ireland (1): 2007

Individual

- Veikkausliiga Coach of the Month: October 2010August 2011,
