= 2008 Setanta Sports Cup =

Tournament details
- Country: Northern Ireland; Republic of Ireland
- Teams: 8

Final positions
- Champions: Cork City (1st title)
- Runners-up: Glentoran

Tournament statistics
- Matches played: 27
- Goals scored: 72 (2.67 per match)

The 2008 Setanta Sports Cup was the 4th staging of the Setanta Sports Cup, a cross-border cup competition featuring football clubs from the Republic of Ireland and Northern Ireland. The final was played on November 1, 2008, at Turners Cross in Cork.

== Group stage ==
The draw for this round was held 17 January 2008. The matches were played 26 February 2008 – 23 September 2008.

Teams that progressed to the Semi-Finals are indicated in bold type.

Teams eliminated from the Setanta Sports Cup this stage are indicated in italics.

=== Group 1 ===
Team	Pld	W	D	L	GF	GA	GD	Pts
(Republic of Ireland) **Drogheda Utd**	6	4	2	0	13	3	+10	**14**
(Republic of Ireland) **Cork City**	6	4	2	0	11	2	+9	**14**
(Northern Ireland) Cliftonville	6	1	1	4	6	11	-5	**4**
(Northern Ireland) Dungannon Swifts	6	0	1	5	3	17	-14	**1**

26 February 2008

Drogheda United	3 – 2	Cliftonville
Zayed 40', 86'; Baker 74'	(Report)	Murphy 57'; M Holland 87'

United Park, Drogheda
Referee: (Northern Ireland) David Malcolm

26 February 2008

Dungannon Swifts	0 – 2	Cork City
	(Report)	O'Callaghan 16', 40'

Stangmore Park, Dungannon
Referee: (Northern Ireland) Alan Black

18 March 2008

Cork City	0 – 0	Drogheda United
	(Report)

Turners Cross, Cork
Referee: (Republic of Ireland) Dave McKeon

18 March 2008

Cliftonville	0 – 0	Dungannon Swifts
	(Report)

Solitude, Belfast

14 April 2008

Cork City	2 – 0	Cliftonville
O'Flynn 68'; Mooney 75'	(Report)

Turners Cross, Cork
Referee: (Republic of Ireland) Declan Hanney

14 April 2008

Dungannon Swifts	0 – 4	Drogheda United
	(Report)	Grant 4'; Gartland 35'; McMinn 63' (o.g.); O'Brien 85'

Stangmore Park, Dungannon
Referee: (Northern Ireland) Brian Turkington

1 September 2008

Cliftonville	0 – 2	Cork City
	(Report)	Behan 38', 75'

Donegal Celtic Park, Belfast
Referee: (Northern Ireland) Alan Black

1 September 2008

Drogheda United	3 – 0	Dungannon Swifts
Hughes 28'; Zayed 76'; Cahill 88'	(Report)

United Park, Drogheda
Referee: (Republic of Ireland) Damien Hancock

15 September 2008

Drogheda United	1 – 1	Cork City
Tambouras 50'	(Report)	Murphy 44'

United Park, Drogheda
Referee: (Republic of Ireland) Dave McKeon

15 September 2008

Dungannon Swifts	2 – 4	Cliftonville
Adamson 8'; Baker 47'		Patterson 2'; Hamill 34', 61'; McMullan 80'

Stangmore Park, Dungannon

22 September 2008

Cliftonville	0 – 2	Drogheda United
		Zayed 30'; Hughes 54'

Donegal Celtic Park, Belfast

22 September 2008

Cork City	4 – 1	Dungannon Swifts
Murphy 23'; Kearney 39'; Behan 63' (pen.); Ryan 70'		McGerrigan 55'

Turners Cross, Cork

=== Group 2 ===
Team	Pld	W	D	L	GF	GA	GD	Pts
(Republic of Ireland) **Derry City**	6	4	1	1	10	4	+6	**13**
(Northern Ireland) **Glentoran**	6	2	2	2	10	10	0	**8**
(Northern Ireland) Linfield	6	2	1	3	8	12	-4	**7**
(Republic of Ireland) St Patrick's Athletic	6	1	2	3	6	8	-2	**5**

10 March 2008

Linfield	3 – 1	Derry City
Delaney 23' (o.g.); Thompson 40'; Ferguson 86' (pen.)	(Report)	Martyn 79'

Windsor Park, Belfast
Attendance: 3,000 (approx)
Referee: (Republic of Ireland) Dave McKeon

10 March 2008

St Patrick's Athletic	3 – 3	Glentoran
O'Neill 20', 89'; Fahey 90'	(Report)	Halliday 5'; Nixon 72' (pen.); Fordyce 85'

Richmond Park, Dublin
Attendance: 1,500 (approx.)

7 April 2008

Glentoran	1 – 3	Linfield
Boyce 8'	(Report)	McAreavey 32', 49'; Dickson 69'

The Oval, Belfast
Attendance: 4,000 (approx.)

7 April 2008

Derry City	2 – 0	St Patrick's Athletic
Martyn 37'; Brennan 47' (o.g.)	(Report)

The Brandywell, Derry

15 April 2008

Glentoran	1 – 1	Derry City
Nixon 70'	(Report)	Sammon 50' (pen.)

The Oval, Belfast
Referee: (Northern Ireland) Mark Courtney

15 April 2008

St Patrick's Athletic	2 – 0	Linfield
Quigley 7'; O'Neill 76'	(Report)

Richmond Park, Dublin
Attendance: 5,300
Referee: (Republic of Ireland) Alan Kelly

2 September 2008

Derry City	2 – 0	Glentoran
Higgins 35'; Farren 84'	(Report)

The Brandywell, Derry
Referee: (Republic of Ireland) Ian Stokes

2 September 2008

Linfield	1 – 1	St Patrick's Athletic
Mulgrew 89'	(Report)	Fahey 40'

Windsor Park, Belfast

15 September 2008

Linfield	1 – 4	Glentoran
Garrett 7'	(Report)	Gardiner 3' (pen.); Boyce 27'; Halliday 53', 68'

Windsor Park, Belfast

15 September 2008

St Patrick's Athletic	0 – 1	Derry City
	(Report)	McHugh 33'

Richmond Park, Dublin
Referee: (Republic of Ireland) Anthony Buttimer

6 October 2008

Derry City	3 – 0	Linfield
Farren 23', 63', 84'	(Report)

The Brandywell, Derry

6 October 2008

Glentoran	1 – 0	St Patrick's Athletic
Fordyce 6'	(Report)

The Oval, Belfast

== Semi-finals ==
The draw for the semi-finals was made by drawing the winners of Group A against the runners-up of Group 2 and vice versa, with group winners having home advantage. Glentoran beat Drogheda United 1–0 in the first semi-final, which was played at United Park in Drogheda, while Cork City overcame Derry City by the same scoreline at the Brandywell Stadium in Derry.

13 October 2008

Drogheda United	0 – 1	Glentoran
	(Report)	Hill 3'; Leeman (red card) 74'; Hill (red card) 89'

United Park, Drogheda

14 October 2008

Derry City	0 – 1	Cork City
	(Report)	Kiely 67'

The Brandywell, Derry
Attendance: 3,000
Referee: (Northern Ireland) David Malcolm

== Final ==
The final took place on November 1, 2008, at Turners Cross stadium in front of 5,500, a sell out crowd, in Cork, where Cork City came from behind to beat Glentoran 2-1 and win the competition for the first time.

1 November 2008

Cork City	2 – 1	Glentoran
Murray 57'; Kearney 74'	(Report)	Kyle Neill 12'

Turners Cross, Cork
Attendance: 5,500
Referee: (Republic of Ireland) Ian Stokes

Winner of 2008 Setanta Sports Cup
(Republic of Ireland) Cork City
1st Title

== Goalscorers ==
4 goals

- (Republic of Ireland) Mark Farren (Derry City)
- (Libya) Éamon Zayed (Drogheda United)

3 goals

- (Republic of Ireland) Denis Behan (Cork City)
- (Northern Ireland) Daryl Fordyce (Glentoran)
- (Northern Ireland) Michael Halliday (Glentoran)
- (Republic of Ireland) Gary O'Neill (St Patrick's Athletic)

2 goals

- (Northern Ireland) Darren Boyce (Glentoran)
- (Republic of Ireland) Keith Fahey (St Patrick's Athletic)
- (Northern Ireland) Rory Hamill (Cliftonville)
- (Australia) Adam Hughes (Drogheda United)
- (Republic of Ireland) Ciarán Martyn (Derry City)
- (Northern Ireland) Paul McAreavey (Linfield)
- (Republic of Ireland) Darren Murphy (Cork City)
- (Northern Ireland) Colin Nixon (Glentoran)
- (Republic of Ireland) George O'Callaghan (Cork City)

1 goal

- (Northern Ireland) Timmy Adamson (Dungannon Swifts)
- (Northern Ireland) Aaron Baker (Dungannon Swifts)
- (Republic of Ireland) Richie Baker (Drogheda United)
- (Republic of Ireland) Killian Brennan (Derry City)
- (Republic of Ireland) Ollie Cahill (Drogheda United)
- (Northern Ireland) Mark Dickson (Linfield)
- (Northern Ireland) Glenn Ferguson (Linfield)
- (Northern Ireland) Grant Gardiner (Glentoran)
- (Northern Ireland) Robert Garrett (Linfield)
- (Republic of Ireland) Graham Gartland (Drogheda United)
- (Republic of Ireland) Tony Grant (Drogheda United)
- (Northern Ireland) Ruaidhri Higgins (Derry City)
- (Northern Ireland) Jason Hill (Glentoran)
- (Northern Ireland) Mark Holland (Cliftonville)
- (Republic of Ireland) Liam Kearney (Cork City)
- (Republic of Ireland) Timmy Kiely (Cork City)
- (Northern Ireland) Shea McGerrigan (Dungannon Swifts)
- (Republic of Ireland) Kevin McHugh (Derry City)
- (Northern Ireland) George McMullan (Cliftonville)
- (Republic of Ireland) Dave Mooney (Cork City)
- (Northern Ireland) Jamie Mulgrew (Linfield)
- (Northern Ireland) Francis Murphy (Cliftonville)
- (England) Dan Murray (Cork City)
- (Republic of Ireland) Declan O'Brien (Drogheda United)
- (Republic of Ireland) John O'Flynn (Cork City)
- (Northern Ireland) Mark Patterson (Cliftonville)
- (Republic of Ireland) Mark Quigley (St Patrick's Athletic)
- (Republic of Ireland) Darragh Ryan (Cork City)
- (Republic of Ireland) Conor Sammon (Derry City)
- (Australia) John Tambouras (Drogheda United)
- (Northern Ireland) Peter Thompson (Linfield)

1 own goal

- (Republic of Ireland) Clive Delaney (Derry City)
- (Northern Ireland) Adam McMinn (Dungannon Swifts)
