= 2008 FAI Cup final =

- Event: 2008 FAI Cup
Bohemians	Derry City
2	2
- Bohemians won 4–2 on penalties
- Date: 23 November 2008
- Venue: RDS, Dublin
- Referee: Anthony Buttimer
- Attendance: 10,281

The 2008 FAI Cup final was a football match held at the RDS, Dublin on 23 November 2008 and was the final match of the 2008 FAI Cup competition. The match was the 85th FAI Cup Final, and the second to be held at the RDS since Lansdowne Road shut for redevelopment. The final was contested by Bohemians and Derry City, with Bohemians winning 4–3 on penalties after extra time had finished 2–2. It was the first ever FAI Cup Final to be decided by a penalty shoot-out and it was the seventh time Bohemians had won the trophy, the victory granting them a league and cup double for the season. It was the second league and cup double won by Bohemians in the 2000s. Anthony Buttimer was the referee for the match.

The winning team qualified for the 2009–10 UEFA Europa League, the first time this competition will run. The match was broadcast live on RTÉ Two.

== Team news ==
As was the case for much of the season, Bohemians' manager Pat Fenlon had to adjust his defence as Jason McGuinness missed the match through suspension. In McGuinness's absence, Ken Oman partnered Liam Burns in the middle of the defence. Anto Murphy left Fenlon having to choose Jason Byrne, Mindaugas Kalonas or John Paul Kelly as his replacement. Derry City had no injury or suspension concerns in the build-up to the final.

== Match details ==
23 November 2008
15:00 UTC

Bohemians	2 – 2 (aet)	Derry City
Crowe 64'; Byrne 70' (pen.)	Report	Morrow 60', 76'
Penalties
Killian Brennan (penalty scored); Stephen O'Donnell (penalty scored); Glenn Cronin (penalty scored); Mark Rossiter (penalty missed); Mindaugas Kalonas (penalty scored)	4–2	Mark Farren (penalty scored); Kevin McHugh (penalty scored); Kevin Deery (penalty missed); Ruaidhri Higgins (penalty missed)

RDS, Dublin
Attendance: 10,281
Referee: Anthony Buttimer

Bohemians	Derry City

BOHEMIANS:
GK	1	Brian Murphy
	2	Owen Heary (c)
	5	Liam Burns
	6	Ken Oman
	3	Mark Rossiter
	10	Jason Byrne	(substituted off) 77'
	4	Stephen O'Donnell
	8	Gary Deegan	(substituted off) 105'
	11	Killian Brennan
	9	Glen Crowe
	7	Neale Fenn	(substituted off) 61'
Substitutes:
	12	John Paul Kelly
	14	Glenn Cronin	(substituted on) 105'
	15	Thomas Heary
	16	Mindaugas Kalonas	(substituted on) 61'
	17	Brendan McGill	(substituted on) 77'
	18	Conor Powell
	25	Chris Konopka
Manager:
Pat Fenlon

DERRY CITY:
GK	16	Gerard Doherty
	2	Eddie McCallion
	21	Clive Delaney
	4	Peter Hutton (c)
	6	Stephen Gray
	14	Gareth McGlynn	(substituted off) 90'
	15	Kevin Deery
	17	Barry Molloy	(substituted off) 90'
	20	Niall McGinn
	18	Mark Farren
	9	Sam Morrow	(substituted off) 105'
Substitutes:
GK	1	Darren Quigley
	5	Mark McChrystal
	7	Ruaidhri Higgins	(substituted on) 90'
	8	Ciarán Martyn
	10	Kevin McHugh	(substituted on) 105'
	12	Aaron Callaghan
	22	Thomas Stewart
Manager:
Stephen Kenny

MATCH OFFICIALS

- Assistant referees:
  - Eddie Foley
  - Ken Hennessy
- Fourth official: Richie Winter

MATCH RULES

- 90 minutes.
- 30 minutes of extra-time if necessary.
- Penalty shoot-out if scores still level.
- Seven named substitutes
- Maximum of 3 substitutions.

== See also ==
- FAI Cup 2008
