= Stephen Bradley (footballer) =

Irish footballer (born 1984)

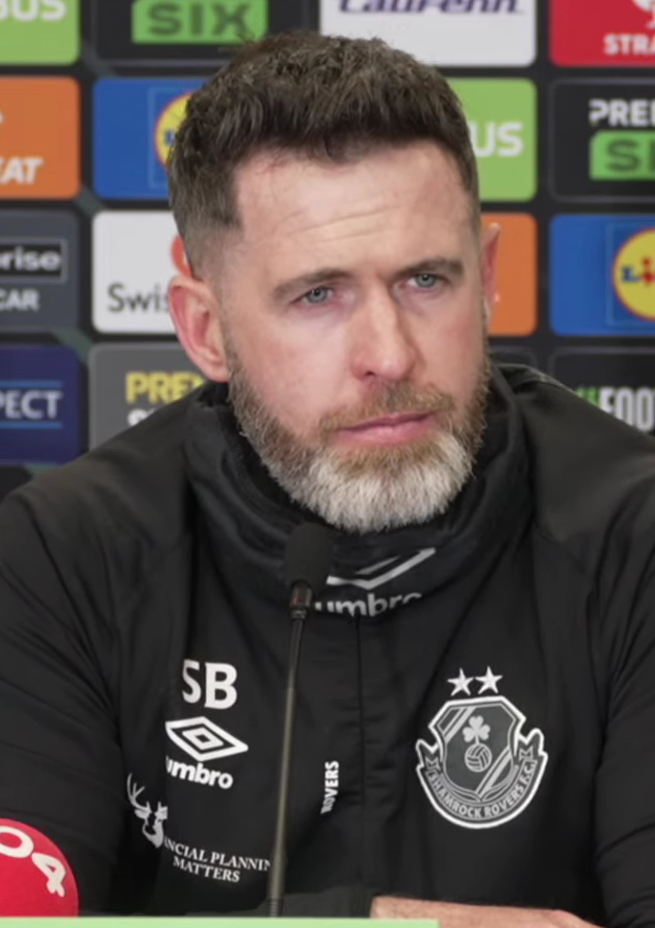
- Bradley managing Shamrock Rovers in 2024

Personal information
- Date of birth: 19 November 1984 (age 41)
- Place of birth: Dublin, Ireland
- Position: Midfielder

Youth career
- Lourdes Celtic
- –2004: Arsenal

Senior career*
Years	Team	Apps	(Gls)
2004–2005	Arsenal	0	(0)
2004–2005	→ Dunfermline Athletic (loan)	5	(0)
2005–2007	Drogheda United	49	(7)
2008	Falkirk	3	(0)
2009–2010	Shamrock Rovers	46	(2)
2011	St Patrick's Athletic	30	(3)
2012–2013	Limerick	55	(2)

International career
2000	Republic of Ireland U16	2	(0)
2004	Republic of Ireland U21	2	(0)

Managerial career
- 2016–: Shamrock Rovers
- * Club domestic league appearances and goals

Stephen Bradley (born 19 November 1984) is an Irish retired footballer. He has been the manager of Shamrock Rovers since July 2016. Besides the Republic of Ireland, he has played in England and Scotland.

== Club career ==
=== Early career ===
Bradley played schoolboy football with Lourdes Celtic, then trialled with Chelsea before joining Arsenal, where he became captain of the club's reserve side, without ever breaking into the senior side. In early 2003, he was victim of an armed robbery that resulted in him being stabbed in the head as well as suffering broken ribs, with the recovery period preventing him from partaking in contact activity for over a year, it effectively ended his senior Arsenal career before it had started. On 1 October 2004, he joined Scottish Premier League club Dunfermline Athletic on a short-term loan deal, in which he made just 2 appearances.

=== Drogheda United ===
In March 2005, Bradley returned to Ireland, signing for League of Ireland Premier Division club Drogheda United. his first season at United Park, Bradley picked up an FAI Cup winners medal as Drogheda beat Cork City 2–0 in the 2005 FAI Cup final at Lansdowne Road. He was also part of the side that won the 2007 League of Ireland Premier Division but he left Drogheda at the end of that season having made 29 league appearances and scoring seven goals, including three appearances in the UEFA Cup for the Boynesiders.

=== Falkirk ===
In January 2008, Bradley signed for Scottish club Falkirk and made four appearances for the 'Bairns' before being let go in July 2008.

=== Shamrock Rovers ===
In January 2009 Bradley signed for Michael O'Neill at Shamrock Rovers and made his debut on the opening day of the 2009 League of Ireland season in a 0–0 draw away to Bray Wanderers. He made 30 league appearances in his first season with the Hoops and made 16 more in Rovers' title winning season of 2010. He made three appearances in the 2010–11 UEFA Europa League.

=== St Patrick's Athletic ===
On 5 January 2011, Bradley signed for one of Rovers' rivals St Patrick's Athletic. In 30 league appearances during 2011 he scored three times from the penalty spot and also played a key role in the club's run to the third qualifying round of the 2011–12 UEFA Europa League. At the end of the season he was voted into the 2011 PFAI Premier Division Team of the Year by his fellow players in the league, but was not kept on at the club by newly appointed manager Liam Buckley.

=== Limerick ===
In January 2012, he signed for League of Ireland First Division club Limerick. In his first season with the club, he helped them to win the 2012 League of Ireland First Division title and gaining promotion to the Premier Division. He was voted into the 2012 PFAI First Division Team of the Year. The following season he remained with the club for their first year back in the top flight, before retiring at the end of the season, playing his last game at the age of just 28.

== International career ==
Bradley represented Republic of Ireland national football team at U14, U15, U16 and U21 levels. In October 2000, Bradley played for the Republic of Ireland national football team U16s in a qualifying tournament in Riga for the 2001 UEFA European Under-16 Championship where he came up against Andrés Iniesta.

== Managerial career ==
=== Shamrock Rovers ===
In 2016, Bradley became caretaker manager of Shamrock Rovers and was named as the new head-coach in November 2016.

In 2019, Bradley guided Shamrock Rovers to finish in second place in the League of Ireland Premier Division, finishing 11 points behind first-place Dundalk FC. In the 2019 FAI Cup, they saw better success, reaching the final against Dundalk and winning 4–2 on penalties to claim their first national silverware in eight years, and their first FAI Cup win since 1987.

In 2020, Shamrock Rovers won their 18th league title under Bradley, winning the title with four games to spare.

In 2021 Bradley's Rovers team retained the title, winning the league by sixteen points.

In May 2022, Bradley turned down an offer from EFL League One club Lincoln City to become their manager.

The three in a row was achieved in the 2022 League of Ireland Premier Division season as well as group qualification for the 2022–23 UEFA Europa Conference League. In the 2023 League of Ireland Premier Division season, Bradley guided Rovers to a fourth consecutive title.

In 2024, Rovers finished 2nd in the league after Shelbourne clinched the title on the final day of the season. Bradley lead rovers to the knockout stage of the 2024-25 UEFA Conference League being the first manager to lead an Irish team to this stage.

In 2025, Bradley led Shamrock Rovers to a domestic double after beating Cork City 2–0, Rovers first double since 1987.

In September 2026, he emerged as favourite for the vacant role of Hibernian manager, though the move did not materialise after Bradley stepped away from negotiations stating he wouldn't walk away from Rovers with just 5 games left in the season in the middle of the title race, with Dutch manager Marink Reedijk ending up at the Scottish Premiership club instead.

== Personal life ==
When he was 18 years old, living in North London while with Arsenal, Bradley was the victim of an armed burglary in which he was held at gunpoint and stabbed in the head, with the knife millimetres from piercing his brain, nearly killing him, while he also suffered broken ribs, with the recovery period of over a year effectively ending his senior Arsenal career before it had started, while Bradley later spoke of his mental state that during that period, stating that "I hated football, hated life and everything about it, I was angry".

In June 2022, his son Josh was diagnosed with Leukaemia aged 8, with Bradley juggling managing his son's treatment alongside managing Shamrock Rovers on a day-by-day basis until his son received the all-clear from cancer in August 2025.

== Career statistics ==
=== Playing career ===
As of 7 October 2026

Appearances and goals by club, season and competition
Club	Season	League			National Cup (Note: Includes FA Cup, Scottish Cup & FAI Cup)		League Cup (Note: Includes EFL Cup, Scottish League Cup & League of Ireland Cup)		Europe		Other		Total	
Club	Season	Division	Apps	Goals	Apps	Goals	Apps	Goals	Apps	Goals	Apps	Goals	Apps	Goals
Arsenal	2004–05	Premier League	0	0	0	0	0	0	0	0	0	0	0	0
Dunfermline Athletic (loan)	2004–05	Scottish Premier League	2	0	—		0	0	—		—		2	0
Drogheda United	2005	LOI Premier Division	19	0	2	0	0	0	—		—		21	0
Drogheda United	2006	LOI Premier Division	15	2	2	0	1	0	2 (Note: Appearances in the UEFA Cup)	0	7 (Note: Appearances in the Setanta Sports Cup)	1	27	3
Drogheda United	2007	LOI Premier Division	10	0	1	0	0	0	1	0	5	0	17	0
Drogheda United	Total		44	2	5	0	1	0	3	0	12	1	65	3
Falkirk	2007–08	Scottish Premier League	3	0	0	0	1	0	—		—		4	0
Shamrock Rovers	2009	LOI Premier Division	30	1	3	1	3	1	—		—		36	3
Shamrock Rovers	2010	LOI Premier Division	16	1	4	0	3	0	3 (Note: Appearances in the UEFA Europa League)	0	1 (Note: Appearances in the Leinster Senior Cup)	0	39	3
Shamrock Rovers	Total		46	2	7	1	6	1	3	0	1	0	63	4
St Patrick's Athletic	2011	LOI Premier Division	30	3	4	1	2	0	5	0	3	0	44	3
Limerick	2012	LOI First Division	22	1	1	0	3	0	—		0 (Note: Appearances in the Munster Senior Cup)	0	26	1
Limerick	2013	LOI Premier Division	26	0	1	1	2	0	—		0	0	29	1
Limerick	Total		48	1	2	1	5	0	—		0	0	55	2
Career total			173	8	18	3	15	1	11	0	16	1	233	12

=== Managerial career ===
As of 30 October 2026

Team	From	To	Record							
Team	From	To	G	W	D	L	F	A	Gd	Win %
(Republic of Ireland) Shamrock Rovers	7 July 2016	Present	474	254	94	126	766	474	+292	53.59
Total			474	254	94	126	766	474	+292	53.59

== Honours ==
=== Player ===
Drogheda United

- League of Ireland Premier Division: 2007
- FAI Cup: 2005
- Setanta Sports Cup: 2006, 2007

Shamrock Rovers

- League of Ireland Premier Division: 2010

St Patrick's Athletic

- Leinster Senior Cup: 2010–11

Limerick

- League of Ireland First Division: 2012
- Munster Senior Cup: 2011–12

Republic of Ireland U21

- Madeira Cup: 2004

Individual

- PFAI Premier Division Team of the Year: 2011
- PFAI First Division Team of the Year: 2012

=== Manager ===
Shamrock Rovers

- League of Ireland Premier Division: 2020, 2021, 2022, 2023, 2025, 2026
- FAI Cup: 2019, 2025
- President of Ireland's Cup: 2022, 2024

Individual

- PFAI Manager of the Year: 2020, 2021, 2022, 2023, 2025
- RTÉ Sports Manager of the Year Award: 2025
