= Ben Dumigan =

Irish footballer (born 2009)

Personal information
- Date of birth: 12 January 2009 (age 17)
- Place of birth: Cork, Ireland
- Height: 1.88 m (6 ft 2 in)
- Position: Centre-back

Youth career
- 2015–2022: Midleton
- 2023–2025: Cork City

International career
Years	Team	Apps	(Gls)
2024	Republic of Ireland U15	9	(0)
2024	Republic of Ireland U16	4	(0)
2024	Republic of Ireland U17	2	(0)

Ben Dumigan (born 12 January 2009) is an Irish former footballer who played as a centre-back

Dumigan played youth football with Midleton and Cork City. In 2025, Dumigan was scheduled to sign for Hoffenheim, however his medical revealed he had a heart condition which forced him to retire from football at the age of only 16.

Dumigan is a former Republic of Ireland youth international.

== Youth career ==
=== Midleton ===
Dumigan joined Munster Senior League side Midleton at the age of just six years old. Dumigan would go on to captain the side from U12 level, which included winning an All-Ireland championship at U13 level.

=== Cork City ===
Dumigan joined Cork City at U14 level ahead of the 2023 season.

== Club career ==
=== Cork City ===
Dumigan was allocated a senior squad number by League of Ireland Premier Division club Cork City ahead of the 2025 season.

=== Hoffenheim ===
In January 2025, Dumigan was set to sign for Bundesliga club Hoffenheim on a multi-year deal.

=== Retirement ===
During medical tests that were done as a part of his move to Hoffenheim, Dumigan was diagnosed with Hypertrophic Cardiomyopathy, a condition which causes a thickening in the heart muscle. The diagnosis was confirmed by consultant cardiologists in Cork.

As a result of this diagnosis, Dumigan was forced to retire from football at the age of just 16, as playing competitive football with his condition would put him at higher risk of developing a potentially fatal irregular heart rhythm, or arrhythmia.

Dumigan expressed gratitude about the diagnosis as he said “the diagnosis may have saved my life, and I am very grateful for that”.

== International career ==
On 22 April 2024, Dumigan was called up to the Republic of Ireland U15s for a tournament in Udine, Italy. Dumigan played in all three of Ireland's games during the tournament, as they defeated the UAE and North Macedonia, before losing to Austria in the semi-finals.

On 2 September 2024, Dumigan was named in the Republic of Ireland U17 squad for two friendlies against Denmark in San Pedro del Pinatar, Spain. On 8 September, Dumigan made his debut for the U17s in a 0–2 defeat to Denmark.

On 4 October 2024, Dumigan was called up to the Republic of Ireland U16 squad for the 2024 Victory Shield, which Ireland would go on to win with a 1–0 win over Northern Ireland.

== Honours ==
Republic of Ireland U16

- Victory Shield: 2024
