= Jason Gavin (footballer) =

Irish footballer

Personal information
- Full name: Jason Joseph Gavin
- Date of birth: 14 March 1980 (age 46)
- Place of birth: Dublin, Ireland
- Position: Centre back

Youth career
- Crumlin United
- 1996–1997: Middlesbrough

Senior career*
Years	Team	Apps	(Gls)
1997–2003	Middlesbrough	31	(0)
1997	→ Hartlepool United (loan)	2	(0)
2002–2003	→ Grimsby Town (loan)	10	(0)
2003	→ Huddersfield Town (loan)	10	(1)
2003–2005	Bradford City	41	(0)
2005	Shamrock Rovers	17	(0)
2005–2008	Drogheda United	65	(4)
2008–2009	St Patrick's Athletic	44	(2)
2010–2012	Stirling Lions		
Total		220	(7)

International career
- Republic of Ireland U-21
1995	Republic of Ireland U17	2	(0)
- * Club domestic league appearances and goals

Jason Joseph Gavin (born 14 March 1980) is an Irish former professional footballer, who played as a defender from 1996 to 2012.

Gavin notably played Premier League football in England for Middlesbrough, before playing for Hartlepool United, Grimsby Town, Huddersfield Town and Bradford City. He later returned to his native country of Ireland where he played for Shamrock Rovers, Drogheda United and St Patrick's Athletic. In 2010, he emigrated to Australia and played for the Stirling Lions.

== Career ==
Born in Dublin, Gavin played as a junior with Crumlin United, before he moved to English club Middlesbrough, where he made his professional début in the Tyne–Tees derby against Newcastle United, playing the full 90 minutes of a 1–1 draw, and starting the following week against Manchester United. In 2001, he signed a contract extension to 2005, with new manager Steve McClaren saying he wanted him to be pushing for a first-team place with Mark Hudson.

During his time at Middlesbrough, he had loan spells at Hartlepool United, Grimsby Town, and Huddersfield Town.

In 2003 he signed for Bradford City for a "small fee", with hopes of more first-team opportunities to be selected for the Irish national team again.

Gavin signed for Shamrock Rovers at the start of the 2005 season and made his league debut on the opening day of the season on 18 March 2005.

Gavin signed for Drogheda United in the summer of 2005 where he played for three years. On 23 April 2006, he helped Drogheda keep a clean-sheet in the final of the Setanta Sports Cup against Cork City. For his overall performances that month, he was awarded the League of Ireland Player of the Month. Drogheda and Gavin would win the 2007 League of Ireland Premier Division following a 2–1 win against Cork City.

In February 2008, he had a training ground bust-up with Drogheda manager Paul Doolin, but soon committed his future to the club after the two settled their differences. However, by July, Gavin was training on his own.

Later that month, he signed for St Patrick's Athletic, and helped his new club keep a clean sheet on his début against Cork City. In the UEFA Cup qualifying round fixture against Swedish club Elfsborg, he scored the first European goal of his career, scoring the equaliser in the 88th minute of an eventual 2–1 win, which helped St Patrick's through to the next round. Gavin left St Pat's in 2010, with both parties cancelling his contract by mutual consent.

Gavin finished his career whilst playing for Australian side Stirling Lions.

== International ==
As a member of the Irish Under-19 team, he won the European Under-18 Championships in 1998 in Cyprus under Brian Kerr. He also played at the FIFA World Youth Championship finals in Nigeria in 1999 as well as at U17 level. He was called up to the senior Ireland squad by Mick McCarthy in 2000, but was ultimately not capped at that level.

== Honours ==
Drogheda United

- League of Ireland Premier Division: 2007

== Sources ==
- Dave Galvin; Gerry Desmond. Irish Football Handbook. ISBN 0-9517987-3-1.
