= James Keddy =

Irish footballer and coach

Personal information
- Full name: James Keddy
- Date of birth: 26 March 1973 (age 53)
- Place of birth: Dublin, Ireland
- Positions: Winger; defender

Youth career
- St. Mary's Boys
- St. Joseph's Boys
- Home Farm

Senior career*
| Years | Team | Apps | (Gls) |
| 1991–1994 | Home Farm | 69 | (9) |
| 1994–1996 | UCD | 44 | (7) |
| 1996–1998 | Derry City | 56 | (9) |
| 1998–2001 | Shelbourne | 61 | (8) |
| 2001–2002 | Dundalk | 28 | (5) |
| 2002–2003 | Shamrock Rovers | 56 | (8) |
| 2004–2005 | Bohemians | 56 | (2) |
| 2006–2007 | Drogheda United | 28 | (4) |
| 2008 | Shelbourne | 30 | (2) |
| Total | | 428 | (54) |

Managerial career
- 2010–2013: Mount Merrion YMCA
- 2015–2016: Home Farm (Director of Football)
- 2019–2021: Bray Wanderers (Assistant Manager)
- 2022: Longford Town (Assistant Manager)
- 2022–2024: Wexford
- * Club domestic league appearances and goals

James Keddy (born 26 March 1973) is an Irish football coach and former player.

== Career ==
Keddy made his League of Ireland debut for Home Farm on 13 October 1991. He joined UCD in 1994 and his other clubs have included Derry City, Shelbourne, Dundalk, Shamrock Rovers, Bohemians and Drogheda United.

Keddy helped Shelbourne win the double of the League of Ireland and FAI Cup in 2000. Keddy received another FAI Cup winners medal as part of the Dundalk cup winning squad of 2002.

He was signed by Liam Buckley for Shamrock Rovers in June 2002 and went on to make a total of 65 appearances, scoring 9 goals, in his two seasons at Rovers. This included 6 appearances in the UEFA Cup and the UEFA Intertoto Cup.

Keddy rejoined former club Shelbourne on 29 November 2007.

Keddy received his first League of Ireland managerial appointment in 2022 with Wexford. On 6 November 2024, it was announced that he had departed the club, following a season in which they reached the 2024 FAI Cup Semi Finals before losing in the Promotion Play-offs at the first hurdle.

== Honours ==
UCD

- League of Ireland First Division (1): 1994–95
- League of Ireland First Division Shield (1): 1994–95
- Leinster Senior Cup (2): 1994–95, 1995–96

Derry City

- League of Ireland Premier Division (1): 1996–97

Shelbourne

- League of Ireland Premier Division (1): 1999–2000
- FAI Cup (1): 2000

Dundalk

- FAI Cup (1): 2002

Drogheda United

- League of Ireland Premier Division (1): 2007
- Setanta Sports Cup (2): 2006, 2007
