= Gary Browne (footballer) =

Northern Irish footballer

Personal information
- Date of birth: 17 January 1983 (age 43)
- Place of birth: Dundonald, Northern Ireland
- Position: Striker

Senior career*
Years	Team	Apps	(Gls)
2002–2003	Manchester City	0	(0)
2003	Whitby Town		
2003–2004	York City	5	(0)
2004	RKSV Leonidas		
2004–2005	Worksop Town		
2005	Belper Town		
2005	Gresley Rovers	7	(0)
2005–2007	Glentoran		
2007–2011	Lisburn Distillery	113	(36)
2011–2013	Linfield	29	(8)
2013–2015	Coleraine FC	51	(14)
2015	Carrick Rangers	19	(0)
2016	Ards	9	(2)

International career
2002–2003	Northern Ireland U21	5	(0)
- * Club domestic league appearances and goals

Gary Browne (born 17 January 1983) is a former footballer, last playing for Ards.
