= Chris Walker (footballer) =

Northern Irish footballer

Personal information
- Full name: Christopher Walker
- Date of birth: 12 November 1973 (age 52)
- Place of birth: Belfast, Northern Ireland
- Position: Defender

Senior career*
Years	Team	Apps	(Gls)
1994–2007	Glentoran	451	(10)
- Armagh City
- Sirocco Works
- * Club domestic league appearances and goals as of 11:57, 4 April 2007 (DST) ‡ National team caps and goals as of 11:57, 4 April 2007 (DST)

Chris Walker (born 12 November 1973) is a Northern Irish former footballer.

Walker played as a centre back for Glentoran from 1994 until January 2007. He previously played for First Liverpool, a minor league club based in east Belfast. He is a Glentoran supporter, growing up close to the club's home, The Oval. A fan's favourite, Walker has the club badge tattooed on his thigh.

In 2006 Walker had a testimonial match against The New Saints F.C., (previously known as TNS) which Glentoran lost 2–1. Former Glens player Jim Cleary featured in the match. Cleary's reason for playing was that if he played he would not be overtaken by Walker on attendances before his 50th birthday.

On 12 January 2007 he left Glentoran to join Armagh City, after a loan spell at the club.

In August 2008 Chris Walker signed for Amateur league side Sirocco Works who play their football in Division 1A where he became player manager. However Walker would later return to the Oval to take charge of Glentoran's Under-17 side.

Walker's son November 2008 to Jaxon Roy Kelly, born in November 2008, died of meningococcal disease on 24 March 2011.

== Honours ==
- Glentoran (1994–2007)
  - Irish Premier League: 1998/99, 2002/03, 2004/05
  - Irish Cup: 1995/96, 1997/98, 1999/00, 2000/01, 2003/04
  - Irish League Cup: 2000/01, 2002/03, 2004/05
  - County Antrim Shield: 1998/99, 1999/00, 2000/01, 2001/02, 2002/03
  - Gold Cup: 1994/95, 1998/99, 1999/00, 2000/01
