= Jermaine Sandvliet =

Dutch footballer

Personal information
- Full name: Jermaine Sandvliet
- Date of birth: 17 July 1977 (age 49)
- Place of birth: Rotterdam, Netherlands
- Height: 1.86 m (6 ft 1 in)
- Position: Midfielder

Senior career*
Years	Team	Apps	(Gls)
1997–2004	FC Dordrecht	202	(7)
2004–2005	Drogheda United	46	(2)
2006–2007	RKSV Leonidas	?	(0)
2007–2012	BVV Barendrecht	?	(11)
- * Club domestic league appearances and goals

Jermaine Sandvliet (born 17 September 1977 in Rotterdam) is a Dutch footballer who played for Dutch club FC Dordrecht in the Eerste Divisie from 1997 to 2004.

He signed for Drogheda United in July 2004.

In his last game he helped Drogheda win the 2005 FAI Cup.

== Honours ==
Drogheda United

- FAI Cup (1): 2005
