= Peter Hutton (footballer) =

Northern Irish footballer (born 1973)

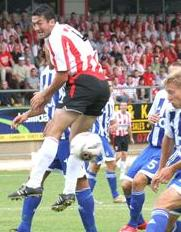
- Hutton after rising to head the ball in 2006

Personal information
- Date of birth: 2 March 1973 (age 53)
- Place of birth: Derry, County Londonderry, Northern Ireland
- Position: Centre back

Youth career
- Oxford United Stars
- Coleraine
- 1989–1990: Bradford City

Senior career*
Years	Team	Apps	(Gls)
1990–1998	Derry City	192	(30)
1998	Portadown	25	(2)
1998–2001	Derry City	92	(3)
2001–2002	Shelbourne	32	(3)
2002–2009	Derry City	216	(13)
2010–2011	Cliftonville	39	(3)
2011	Finn Harps	3	(0)

International career
1988–1989	Northern Ireland U16		
2012	Irish League XI	1	(0)

Managerial career
- 2004: Derry City (caretaker)
- 2007: Derry City (caretaker)
- 2011–2013: Finn Harps
- 2014–2015: Derry City
- 2025–: Institute
- * Club domestic league appearances and goals

Peter Hutton (born 2 March 1973) is a Northern Irish football coach and former centre back, and is currently manager of NIFL Championship side Institute. He spent the majority of his 21 year playing career with Derry City, and set a club record of over 670 appearances in the League of Ireland. His father, also named Peter, played for Finn Harps in the 1970s.

He spent his youth with Oxford United Stars, Coleraine, and Bradford City, before joining Derry City in 1990. Over the next 19 years he had three spells with Derry, winning seven League of Ireland Cup titles, three FAI Cup titles, as well as the League of Ireland title in 1996–97. He was named as both the PFAI Players' Player of the Year and SWAI Personality of the Year in 1996–97. He also had brief spells with Portadown and Shelbourne, and won the league title with Shelbourne in 2001–02. He ended his career in 2011 following short spells with Cliftonville and Finn Harps. He twice served Derry as caretaker-manager, before he managed Finn Harps on a full-time basis from 2011 to 2013 and then Derry City from 2014 to 2015.

== Playing career ==
Hutton began his career with Oxford United Stars in the Derry and District League, and later played for Coleraine. At the age of 15, he joined English side Bradford City's youth training scheme. This saw Hutton move to Bradford for the summer months between seasons while still under contract with Coleraine. In 1990, he signed for his hometown club, Derry City. He made his League of Ireland debut for Derry on 17 March 1991. He scored the second goal in the 1995 FAI Cup final 2–1 success over rivals Shelbourne at Lansdowne Road.

He had trials with English clubs Tranmere Rovers and Port Vale, and played two summer tournament games for the "Valiants" in 1995, before returning to Derry. He captained Derry to the League of Ireland title in 1996–97, and playing in midfield, finished as the club's top-scorer with 19 goals.

He spent the 1998 season with Portadown, before returning to Derry City. He spent 2001 to 2002 at Shelbourne where he won another league title.

By November 2006, Hutton had made his 300th appearance as team-captain after a 1–0 League of Ireland final-night win over Cork City in the Brandywell Stadium. He made a total of more than 670 appearances for Derry City, a club record. He also managed Derry twice on a caretaker basis – in 2004 for a short period in the aftermath of Gavin Dykes' departure and prior to the appointment of Stephen Kenny, and in 2007 following Pat Fenlon's departure.

He was released after the 2009 season, and signed for Cliftonville in December 2009.

== Managerial career ==
In May 2011, Hutton took over the management of League of Ireland First Division club Finn Harps, along with former Derry City teammate Felix Healy. Hutton was declared as the new manager while Healy took on the role of Director of football at the club. He went back to Derry City in November 2013, as an assistant to Roddy Collins. He succeeded Colins as manager the following year and managed the club's highest record win in European competition with a 5–1 away win over Welsh outfit Aberswyth. Disappointment followed with a FAI Cup final loss to St Pats in 2014. Hutton agreed to depart in September 2015 after suffering a 3–0 defeat to Cork City in the quarter-finals of the FAI Cup.

== Honours ==
=== As player ===
Derry City

- League of Ireland: 1996–97; runner-up: 1994–95, 2005, 2006
- FAI Cup: 1995, 2002, 2006; runner-up: 1994, 1997, 2008
- League of Ireland Cup (7): 1992, 1994, 2000, 2005, 2006, 2007, 2008; runner-up: 1990

Shelbourne

- League of Ireland: 2001–02

=== As manager ===
Derry City

- FAI Cup runner-up: 2014

=== Individual ===
- PFAI Players' Player of the Year: 1996–97
- SWAI Personality of the Year: 1996–97
- League of Ireland Premier Division Player of the Month: September 2005
