= Darragh Ryan =

English footballer (born 1980)

Personal information
- Full name: Darragh Ryan
- Date of birth: 21 May 1980 (age 46)
- Place of birth: Cuckfield, England
- Height: 1.80 m (5 ft 11 in)
- Positions: Defender; midfielder

Youth career
- Arsenal

Senior career*
Years	Team	Apps	(Gls)
1999–2002	Brighton & Hove Albion	9	(2)
2002–2003	Crawley Town	15	(0)
2003–2006	UCD	85	(2)
2006	Bognor Regis Town	8	(0)
2007	Worthing	12	(2)
2007	Haywards Heath Town	18	(5)
2007	UCD	24	(0)
2007	Cork City	45	(2)
2009	St Patricks Athletic	35	(1)
2010	Stevenage Borough	0	(0)
2010	Whitehawk	1	(0)
2010	Crawley Town	8	(0)
2011	Southern Stars	44	(2)
- * Club domestic league appearances and goals

Darragh Ryan (born 21 May 1980 in Cuckfield, West Sussex), is a former footballer who last played for Southern Stars in the Victorian State League Division 1.

== Playing career ==
He began his career with Brighton & Hove Albion, for whom he played nine league games, scoring twice. Ryan then moved on to play for another Sussex outfit, Crawley Town. Following this, the player moved to Ireland, signing for UCD. He made his debut for them at home to Waterford, and after a number of years at the club, he returned to England, where he played non-League football with Bognor Regis Town, Worthing and Haywards Heath Town. Ryan then returned to UCD, this time for a more brief spell. Following this, he signed for Cork City where he was part of the 2007 Setanta Cup winning team against Glentoran. He then moved on to St Patrick's Athletic where he got sent off on his European debut at Valletta F.C. He made two appearances in the 2009–10 UEFA Europa League as Pats were knocked out by Steaua Bucharest at the play off stage.

In January 2010, Ryan signed for Conference National side Stevenage Borough on a non-contract basis. He also played at left back in the FA Vase sixth round for Whitehawk at Gresley Rovers, to solve an injury crisis as a favour for the Hawks' manager Darren Freeman. He played two games in similar circumstances the following season, including an FA Trophy match at Margate. He was later released by Stevenage Borough after failing to make a first-team appearance. Shortly after his release, he trialled with one of his former clubs, Crawley Town. Several months after this appearance, it was announced that Ryan had been signed by Crawley. This was the second time that the player had signed for Crawley, having spent time at the club several years previously. Ryan left the club by mutual agreement in September 2010.

== Personal life ==
Ryan's father Gerry played eighteen times for Ireland between 1978 and 1984, scoring once, at home in a European Championship defeat to West Germany.

== Honours ==
Cork City

- Setanta Sports Cup: 2008
