= Darren Lockhart =

Northern Irish footballer and manager

Personal information
- Date of birth: 12 November 1973 (age 52)
- Place of birth: Belfast, Northern Ireland
- Position: Midfielder

Senior career*
Years	Team	Apps	(Gls)
1994–1996	H&W Welders		
1996–1997	Carrick Rangers		
1997–2000	Crusaders		
2000–2007	Glentoran		
2007–2008	Crusaders		
2008–2009	Bangor		
2009–2010	Ballymena United		
2010–2011	Ards		

Managerial career
- 2012–2014: Sirocco Works
- 2015: Dundela
- * Club domestic league appearances and goals

Darren Lockhart (born 12 November 1973) is a Northern Irish football manager and former player.

== Playing career ==
Born in Belfast, Lockhart began his professional career with Crusaders after playing at semi-professional level with H&W Welders and Carrick Rangers. After three years with Crusaders, he later played with Glentoran, where he spent seven years and won numerous trophies, before returning to Crusaders in 2007. Lockhart retired from professional football in April 2008, but was later persuaded to return to the game by Bangor. He signed for Ballymena United in 2009 and left join Championship 1 side Ards for the start of the 2010–11 season where he spent one year.

== Managerial career ==
Lockhart joined Northern Amateur Football League side Sirocco Works in the summer of 2011 initially as a coach. He took over as manager in 2012, and left this position in October 2014.

In April 2015 Lockhart was appointed as manager of Dundela. He was still managing the club as of November 2015.

== Playing style ==
Lockhart was described as having "an engine to burn and a no-nonsense approach to tackling [...] during a distinguished career in the local game."
