= Damien Hancock =

Irish football referee

Damien Hancock (born 10 March 1965) is an Irish soccer referee from Dublin. He has been on the National League panel since 1995, and regularly referees matches at the top level of the League of Ireland.

He was fourth official for the 2002 FAI Cup Final, and in March 2006 refereed the League of Ireland Cup Final at Belfield Park between UCD and Derry City, which Derry won 2-1.

In Europe, he was fourth official for the UEFA Cup match between Valur and Brøndby IF on 27 July 2006, which finished 0-0.

On 3 December 2006 he took charge of his first FAI Cup Final, but the last for the 86-year-old trophy, as a new one was to be introduced for 2007. Derry City beat St Patrick's Athletic 4-3 in the Final, in very windy conditions. This match was also the last soccer game to be played at the old Lansdowne Road before its redevelopment.

== See also ==
- List of football referees
