= 2005 FAI Cup =

Football Association of Ireland Senior Challenge Cup

Tournament details
- Country: Ireland

Final positions
- Champions: Drogheda United
- Runners-up: Cork City F.C.

The 2005 FAI Cup, known as the Carlsberg FAI Cup for sponsorship reasons, was the 85th staging of the Football Association of Ireland Challenge Cup. The tournament is the primary domestic cup competition for association football in the Republic of Ireland. This edition featured teams from the League of Ireland Premier Division and First Division, as well as teams from the regional leagues of the Republic of Ireland football league system.

It officially kicked off in late April, when twenty clubs from the junior and intermediate leagues battled it out for the chance to face League of Ireland opposition in the second round. The ten winners of those ties were joined in the second round by the 22 eircom League of Ireland clubs. The competition ran until early December, with the final taking place on Sunday, December 4.

== First round ==
Matches played on the weekend of Saturday, 24 April 2005.

Tie no	Home team	Score	Away team
1	Lissadel United	3–0	Rockmount
2	St Mary's A.F.C.	1–4	Avondale United
3	Cherry Orchard	0–0	Belgrove
replay	Belgrove	1–2	Cherry Orchard
4	Bangor Celtic	1–2	Wayside Celtic
5	Douglas Hall	2–0	Moyle Park
6	Mount Merrion	2–2	Galway Hibernians
replay	Galway Hibernians	0–0 (3–0 p)	Mount Merrion
7	St Peter's, Athlone	0–0	Carew Park
replay	Carew Park	3–2	St Peter's, Athlone
8	Waterford Crystal	2–0	Bonagee United
9	Westport United	1–2	Fanad United
10	Malahide United	3–2	Glenmore / Dundrum

== Second round ==
Matches were played on the weekend of Sunday, 12 June 2005.

Tie no	Home team	Score	Away team
1	UCD	2–0	Dublin City
2	Shelbourne	0–2	Derry City
3	Drogheda United	2–0	Limerick
4	Waterford United	0–1	St Patrick's Athletic
5	Bohemians	2–0	Athlone Town
6	Galway United	0–0	Cork City
replay	Cork City	1–0	Galway United
7	Avondale United	0–1	Bray Wanderers
8	Carew Park	1–3	Douglas Hall
9	Kilkenny City	0–1	Finn Harps
10	Sligo Rovers	1–1	Malahide United
replay	Malahide United	0–2	Sligo Rovers
11	Kildare County	4–1	Galway Hibernians
12	Longford Town	5–0	Waterford Crystal
13	Cobh Ramblers	0–1	Wayside Celtic
14	Lissadel United	0–4	Cherry Orchard
15	Shamrock Rovers	2–0	Fanad United
16	Monaghan United	1–7	Dundalk

== Third round ==
Matches played on the weekend of Sunday, 28 August 2005.

Tie no	Home team	Score	Away team
1	Dundalk	0–2	Drogheda United
2	Bray Wanderers	1–0	Cherry Orchard
3	Bohemians	2–2	Wayside Celtic
replay	Wayside Celtic	1–2	Bohemians
4	Longford Town	1–1	UCD
replay	UCD	2–1	Longford Town
5	Derry City	3–1	Kildare County
6	Sligo Rovers	2–1	St Patrick's Athletic
7	Shamrock Rovers	2–0	Douglas Hall
8	Cork City	0–0	Finn Harps
replay	Finn Harps	2–3	Cork City

== Quarter-finals ==
23 September 2005

Bray Wanderers	3–2	UCD
Murphy 12'; Tyrell 26'; O'Brien 61'		Martin 64'; McWalter 83'

Carlisle Grounds, Bray

23 September 2005

Drogheda United	2–1	Bohemians
Keegan 2'; Lynch 16'		O'Keefe 50'

United Park, Drogheda

23 September 2005

Cork City	3–1	Sligo Rovers
Murray 45'; O'Flynn 77'; O'Callaghan 84' (pen.)		Low 40'

Turners Cross, Cork

24 September 2005

Derry City	1–0	Shamrock Rovers
Beckett 67'

The Brandywell, Derry

== Semi-finals ==
21 October 2005

Cork City	1–0	Derry City
O'Callaghan 90' (pen.)

Turners Cross, Cork

23 October 2005

Drogheda United	2–1	Bray Wanderers
O'Brien 29'; Sandvliet 80'		Tresson 82'

United Park, Drogheda

== Final ==
4 December 2005
15:15

Cork City	0–2	Drogheda United
	Match Report	G. Whelan 52'; D. O'Brien 83'

Lansdowne Road, Dublin
Attendance: 24,521
Referee: Ian Stokes

Winner of FAI Cup 2005
Drogheda United
1st Title
