= Billy Woods (Irish footballer) =

Irish footballer

Personal information
- Date of birth: 24 October 1973 (age 53)
- Place of birth: Cork, Ireland
- Position: Winger

Youth career
- –1991: Midleton

Senior career*
| Years | Team | Apps | (Gls) |
| 1991–1993 | Coventry City | 0 | (0) |
| 1993–1995 | Cork City | 35 | (10) |
| 1995–1997 | Tranmere Rovers | 1 | (0) |
| 1996–1997 | → Blackpool (loan) | 3 | (0) |
| 1997–1998 | Portadown | 27 | (5) |
| 1998–2002 | Shamrock Rovers | 119 | (14) |
| 2002–2008 | Cork City | 170 | (14) |
| 2010 | Cork City | 14 | (0) |
| Total | | 369 | (43) |

International career
| 1991 | Republic of Ireland U17 | 2 | (1) |
| 1995 | League of Ireland XI | 1 | (1) |
| 1995–1996 | Republic of Ireland U21 | 6 | (0) |
- * Club domestic league appearances and goals as of 18:21, 21 June 2013 (UTC)

William Woods (born 24 October 1973) is an Irish former professional footballer. He is now the Under 15s Coach with Cork City.

== Career ==
Woods played all his schoolboy football with Midleton before spending two and a half years at Coventry City. He joined Cork City in 1993 and made his debut in October, playing under manager Damien Richardson during his first stint as manager when City played in Bishopstown.

He joined Tranmere Rovers in July 1995 . After plying his trade there he returned to Ireland and signed for Portadown F.C. for one season in 1997.

Woods signed for Shamrock Rovers in 1998 in time to make his debut away to Altay S.K. in the UEFA Intertoto-Cup on 21 June. He made two appearances for the Hoops in Europe.

A few weeks later he won a FAI Super Cup medal.

In the 1999–00 season he was the club's joint-top goalscorer and even appeared in goal on one occasion.. Woods scored a very memorable goal in the FAI Cup quarter final replay in 2001. His last game for the club was against Galway United on 31 March 2002.

After Richardson left the club at the end of the 2002 season, Woods rejoined his hometown club.

Woods won the League of Ireland Championship in November 2005. Cork City beat Derry City 2–0 on 18 November 2005 to secure the title in the last game of the season. Although Woods did not play in that game, he had been an integral part of the squad through the year.

After the departure of Liam Kearney to Shelbourne in the 2006 season, Woods filled the gap left by Kearney at left wing.

Woods scored Cork City's winning goal in the UEFA Champions League qualifier in July 2006 against Cypriot champions Apollon Limasoll. Woods was a key player in City's run to the second qualifying round, in which Cork City were beaten by Serbian and former European and World Club Champions Red Star Belgrade 4–0 on aggregate.

Woods agreed to stay with Cork City for another year in February 2007. Once again, he signed a part-time contract with the club so as to dovetail his job as car salesman with training and playing for City.

In February 2008 he signed a new contract to remain at Cork City, but retired in October 2008.

In June 2010, Billy returned to play for Cork City. He made 14 appearances for City that season and was appointed as First Team Coach in December 2010. He is currently doing the UEFA 'B' licence and will be enrolling on the course to do his 'A' Licence in the coming year.
