= Anthony Buttimer =

Irish football referee

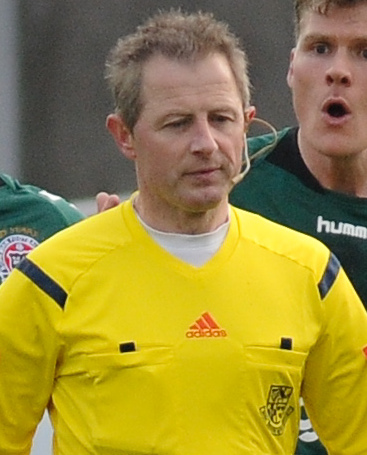
- Buttimer during a 2015 League of Ireland game with Bohemians vs. Galway United at Eamon Deacy Park
- Full name: Anthony Buttimer
- Born: 13 July 1965 (age 61); Drogheda, Ireland

Domestic
Years	League	Role
2007	LOI First Division	Referee
2008	LOI Premier Division	Referee
2010	UEFA Champions League	Referee

International
Years	League	Role
?	UEFA listed	Referee

Anthony Buttimer (born 13 July 1965) is an Irish FIFA-level soccer referee from County Cork. A League of Ireland official, he took charge of the 2008 FAI Cup Final in the RDS, Dublin.

== Career ==
Buttimer regularly referees matches in the League of Ireland. In the past he has been dispatched to referee local derbies including the Connacht Derby contested between Sligo Rovers and Galway United in August 2007. He was also deployed in the 2013 FAI Cup Semi Final and Louth Derby between Dundalk and Drogheda.

In September 2007, Buttimer took issue with the colour of the goalkeeper's jerseys in a game between Dundalk and Shelbourne. It was eventually agreed that the Dundalk goalkeeper would wear a t-shirt with a white strip of tape on the back whilst the Shelbourne goalkeeper would wear a training top for the match. A similar incident occurred in March 2008, when he said that the kit worn by Sligo Rovers was too similar to the kit worn by St Patrick's Athletic.

Buttimer took charge of the 2008-09 UEFA Cup qualifier first round second leg match between KS Vllaznia Shkodër and FC Koper at the Loro-Boriçi Stadium in Shkodër, Albania. The match finished 0 – 0, with him issuing three yellow cards.

On 23 November, Buttimer took charge of the 2008 FAI Cup Final, in which Bohemians beat Derry City This was the first FAI Cup Final to feature a penalty shoot-out.
