= Liam Kearney =

Irish footballer

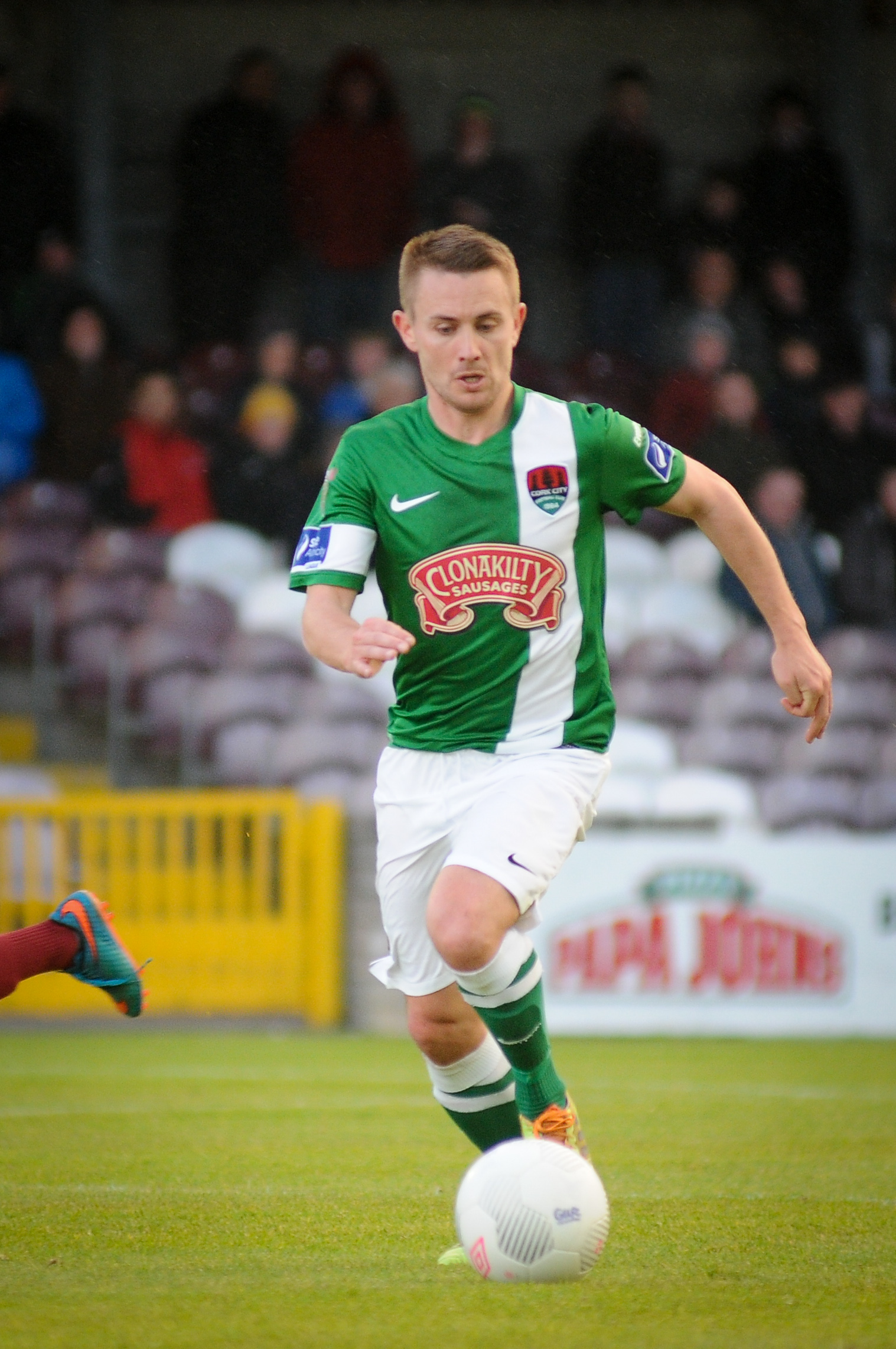
- Liam Kearney in action for Cork City against Galway United in the 2015 League of Ireland

Personal information
- Date of birth: 10 January 1983 (age 43)
- Place of birth: Conna, County Cork, Ireland
- Position: Winger

Youth career
- Valley Rangers
- Fermoy United
- 1999–2001: Nottingham Forest

Senior career*
Years	Team	Apps	(Gls)
2001–2003	Nottingham Forest	0	(0)
2003–2005	Cork City	70	(9)
2006	Shelbourne	10	(1)
2007–2008	Cork City	61	(4)
2009	Derry City	18	(1)
2010	Waterford United	30	(5)
2011–2013	Dandenong Thunder	42	(9)
2014–2015	Cork City	35	(2)

International career
1999–2000	Republic of Ireland U16	7	(0)
2004–2005	Republic of Ireland U21	7	(1)

Managerial career
- 2025: Cork City (co-interim manager)
- * Club domestic league appearances and goals

Liam Kearney (Irish: Liam Ó Cearnaigh; born 10 January 1983), nicknamed "The Conna Maradona", is an Irish former professional footballer associated primarily with Cork City in the League of Ireland. As of 2021, Kearney was "Head of Academy" at Cork City FC.

Kearney played mainly on the left wing and represented the Republic of Ireland U21 team on seven occasions, scoring once.

== Career ==
=== Nottingham Forest ===
Kearney joined Nottingham Forest from Fermoy United after previously playing for Valley Rangers. He was the star of the Cork Schoolboys League Kennedy Cup team in 1998 and as a result signed with Nottingham Forest in 1999. Whilst with Forest, Kearney won the U19 FA Premier League. Kearney appeared many times for several of the underage Irish national teams, from U16 to U20. He played in the U16 European championships in Israel and finished 3rd in Norway in the U19 European Championships. He also attracted interest from Cheltenham manager Bobby Gould.

=== Cork City ===
Kearney returned to Ireland in 2003, joining Cork City. In 2004, he made his Republic of Ireland U21 debut against Italian opposition. Kearney won seven U21 caps whilst with Cork scoring once in a 1–0 victory over Italy. 2005 saw Cork City and Kearney embark on a campaign that would ultimately see them win the league title on the final day, beating Derry City 2–0 in which Kearney scored the second goal. The club also progressed into the First Round of the UEFA Cup, having started as an unseeded side in the first qualifying round, eliminating FK Ekranas from Lithuania and the eventual Swedish champions Djurgårdens IF, before being knocked out by Slavia Prague. Kearney left Cork City for Shelbourne in 2006 following an offer from Dutch Premier Division side Heerenveen was denied to the disappointment of the player.

=== Shelbourne ===
Kearney joined Shelbourne from the then league champions, Cork City, on a free transfer in January 2006. He was limited to few first team opportunities, making just 10 league appearances throughout the season, scoring once. Shelbourne manager Pat Fenlon agreed to a temporary freezing of Kearney's contract whilst he took a few weeks away from football during the 2006 season to regain his hunger and focus. Kearney returned in time to take a left wing berth in a friendly against English Championship side Sunderland. Kearney failed to break into the first team upon his return, but was rewarded with his second league winners medal in two years, as Shelbourne clinched the title on the last day. He has described his time in Dublin as "disappointing".

=== Return to Cork City ===
Kearney departed Shelbourne on 22 January 2007 to rejoin Cork City, signing a two-year contract. Later that year he criticised the club for not settling players' contracts. In August 2008 he said that, despite Cork City's poor financial position and difficulties in re-signing and paying its players, he would prefer to stay with the club. He scored the winning goal in Cork City's Setanta Sports Cup final win over Glentoran but because of City's failure to offer him a new contract due to financial turmoil, Kearney left for Derry City after being approached by Stephen Kenny.

=== Derry City ===
Derry City signed Kearney on the first day of the 2009 January transfer window. He started off well to his career at the Brandywell, however he sustained a broken leg during a match in May against Galway United and was out for three months. By the end of July it was still unclear as to when he would return. He also missed Derry's UEFA Europa League games, which saw them knock out Skonto Riga and run CSKA Sofia close. He expressed his disappointment at not being able to participate in Europe however he said once he regained fitness he was looking forward to helping the Candystripes challenge for the League of Ireland title.

=== Waterford United ===
Kearney signed for Waterford United in what was a significant coup for the club. He became a fans' favourite within his first 5 games scoring the winner against his old club Derry City in his second game. Kearney was a big influence in Waterford United's push for the promotion towards the end of the season. He scored 5 league goals and played 30 league games before leaving the club.

=== Dandenong Thunder SC ===
Kearney signed for Australian Victorian Premier League side Dandenong Thunder SC in January 2011.

=== Return to Cork City 2014 ===
Kearney returned to Cork City FC at the start of the 2014 season from Avondale United, having been denied in joining halfway through the 2013 season due to amateur player regulations. He left the club after the 2015 season in which Cork City were runners up to Dundalk in both the Airtricity League Premier Division and FAI Cup.

=== International career ===
Kearney represented the Republic of Ireland Under-16 team at the 2000 UEFA European Under-16 Championship and the Under-19 team at the 2002 UEFA European Under-19 Championship.

== Coaching career ==
In his last year as a player, Kearney completed his UEFA B Licence and then moved to the United States after his retirement at the end of 2015, where he spent a year coaching full-time at Premier UK Soccer in Raleigh-Durham, North Carolina Area. In January 2017, he returned to Ireland and joined his last club, Cork City, as a first team coach. Kearney later also assumed the role of head coach of the club's Under 17 side. On 17 December 2019 the club confirmed, that Kearney had decided to leave the club.

In March 2020, Kearney was hired as a sports and events coordinator for the Fota Island Resort hotel near Cork. In January 2021, Kearney took a role as "Head of Academy" with Cork City FC, having previously held coaching roles at Galway United.

On 14 May 2025, he was named co-interim manager of Cork City alongside Greg Yelverton following the resignation of manager Tim Clancy. The following day Gerard Nash was appointed manager of the club, but Kearney & Yelverton would still take charge of the club's game away to St Patrick's Athletic the following day before ending their spell as interim managers.

== Honours ==
Cork City

- League of Ireland: 2005
- FAI Cup: 2007
- Setanta Sports Cup: 2008

Shelbourne

- League of Ireland: 2006
