= Dan Murray (English footballer) =

English footballer

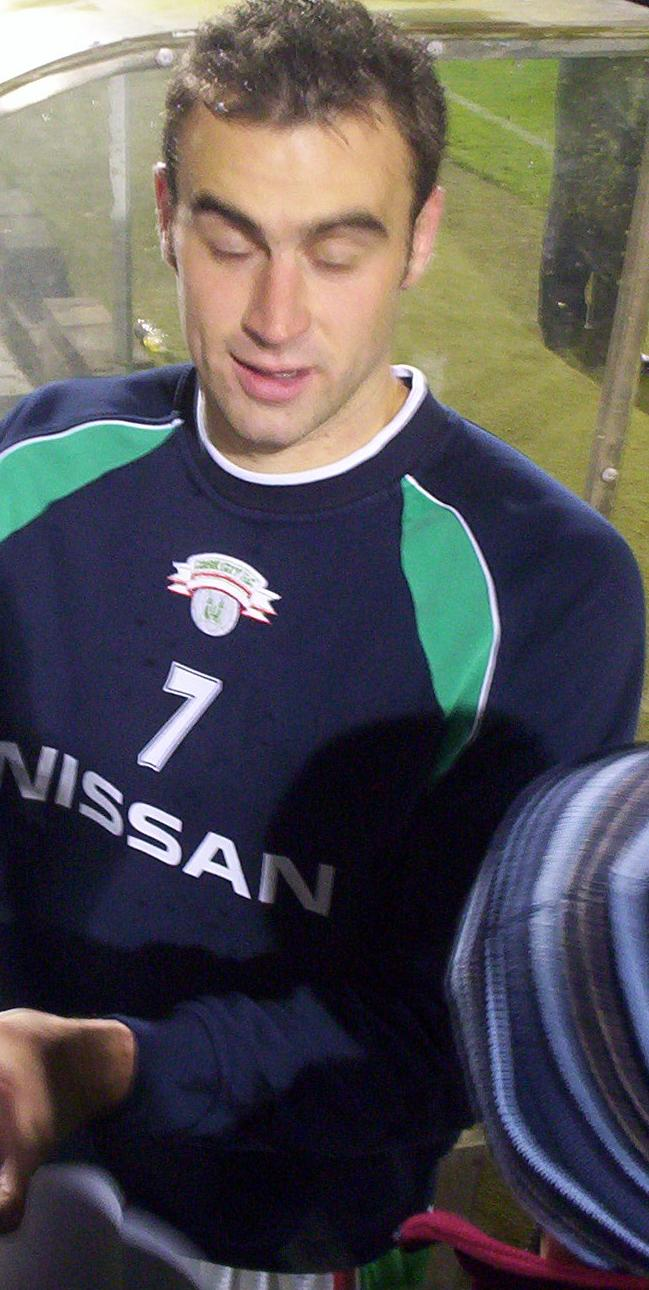

Personal information
- Full name: Daniel Owen Murray
- Date of birth: 16 May 1982 (age 44)
- Place of birth: Cambridge, England
- Height: 1.88 m (6 ft 2 in)
- Position: Centre back

Youth career
- 1998: Cambridge United

Senior career*
| Years | Team | Apps | (Gls) |
| 1999–2002 | Peterborough United | 5 | (0) |
| 2002–2009 | Cork City | 212 | (17) |
| 2010–2011 | Shamrock Rovers | 60 | (5) |
| 2012–2015 | Cork City | 95 | (2) |
- * Club domestic league appearances and goals

Dan Murray (born 16 May 1982) is an English retired footballer who is most known for his time at Cork City.

== Career ==
=== Cork City ===
Born in Cambridge, Murray initially signed for Cork City on loan in 2002, under former manager Liam Murphy, from Peterborough United. One year later, he signed permanently for Cork. During his time on Leeside, he scored vital goals in European competition against Malmö FF in the UEFA Intertoto Cup (2004), Apollon Limassol in the UEFA Champions League qualifier in 2006 and FC Haka in the UEFA Cup in 2008. He is Cork's highest scorer in European competition.

He was booked twice in their run during the 2006 UEFA Champions League qualifiers, once for an imitation of an Apollon Limassol player diving, and secondly during Cork's home game against Crvena Zvezda, when over-eagerly recovering a ball from an opposition player for a throw-in. This saw him miss the away leg in the Marakana, with his replacement being the untested Brian O'Callaghan.

In 2005, Murray was the captain of the League of Ireland Championship winning team that won the title on the last day against Derry City.

Murray's displays in the League of Ireland attracted interest from abroad, his name being linked with English Championship and League One clubs. During the 2008 campaign, with Murray an ever-present at the heart of the Cork defence, Cork kept 31 clean sheets in all competitions.

In January 2010, the continuing degradation of his relationship with Cork City chairman Tom Coughlan and incoming manager Roddy Collins - including the removal of his captaincy to be given to recurrent City signing George O'Callaghan - resulted in a mutual cancellation of his contract with Cork City. Murray admitted that money was a factor in his move; the continuous waiting for payment from the nearly bankrupt club placing strain upon his family life.

=== Shamrock Rovers ===
He signed for Shamrock Rovers on 5 February 2010, and made his debut that night as a second-half substitute in a pre-season friendly win over Shelbourne. He was appointed captain in February 2010. In his two seasons at Rovers he won 2 League of Ireland Premier Division titles, the Setanta Cup and played in the group stages of the Europa League.

He played in 14 European games for Rovers, where he was captain in all 8 games in the Hoops' historic 2011–12 UEFA Europa League campaign.

Murray was released in January 2012.

=== Return to Cork City ===
Murray signed for Cork City once again on 19 January 2012. It was announced that he would also regain his Captaincy. Murray retired after the 2015 season at the age of 33 after a total of 10 years at the club, scoring 19 times in 307 league appearances.

== Honours ==
Cork City

- League of Ireland (1): 2005
- FAI Cup (1): 2007
- Setanta Sports Cup (1): 2008

Shamrock Rovers

- League of Ireland (2): 2010, 2011
- Setanta Sports Cup (1): 2011
