= George O'Callaghan =

Irish footballer and manager

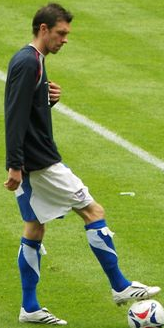
- O'Callaghan as an Ipswich Town player (May 2007).

Personal information
- Full name: George Paul O'Callaghan
- Date of birth: 5 September 1979 (age 47)
- Place of birth: Cork, Ireland
- Height: 6 ft 1 in (1.85 m)
- Position: Attacking midfielder

Youth career
- 1995–1998: Port Vale

Senior career*
Years	Team	Apps	(Gls)
1998–2002	Port Vale	34	(4)
2002–2007	Cork City		
2007–2008	Ipswich Town	12	(1)
2007	→ Brighton & Hove Albion (loan)	14	(0)
2008	Cork City		
2008–2009	Tranmere Rovers	6	(0)
2009	Dundalk	11	(0)
2009	Yeovil Town	12	(0)
2010	Waterford United	8	(2)
2010	Cork City	13	(0)
2011	Cambridge United		
2011	DPMM FC		
2012	Dover Athletic	1	(0)
2016–2017	Rockmount		
Total		111	(7)

Managerial career
- 2014–2015: Sabah
- * Club domestic league appearances and goals

George Paul O'Callaghan (born 5 September 1979) is an Irish former football player and manager.

O'Callaghan started his career with Port Vale in 1995; he made 41 appearances for the club before joining Cork City in 2002. He spent five years at his home town club, making 150 league appearances. This was followed by a return to English football with Ipswich Town before a brief return to Cork in 2008. In the summer of 2008, he signed with Tranmere Rovers before brief spells with Dundalk and Yeovil Town in 2009. He then returned to his homeland for short stays at Waterford United and former club Cork City. He was briefly with Cambridge United in 2011 before he emigrated to Brunei to briefly play for DPMM FC. He joined Dover Athletic for a brief stay in September 2012. He began his management career with the Malaysian side Sabah in 2014, but it lasted only months in the role. He came out of retirement to play for Rockmount in December 2016.

== Playing career ==
O'Callaghan went on trial with Port Vale at the age of 15, and was signed up almost immediately. After two years, he was offered a professional contract. After being named the club's Young Player of the Year, O'Callaghan was on the point of breaking into the first-team in the 1998–99 season, until John Rudge was sacked. Brian Horton took over as manager. O'Callaghan was put back into the youth squad. 13 months later, he made a return to the senior squad, scoring in a draw with Crewe Alexandra. He stayed in the side for the rest of the season and signed a new two-year deal with the club despite an offer from Tottenham Hotspur. Port Vale were relegated to the Second Division that year. O'Callaghan was the top-scorer seven games into the 2000–01 season but was suddenly dropped after a 3–0 loss to Cardiff City. It would be his last game for the "Valiants".

He returned home to Cork in 2002 after his contract ended at Port Vale. Shortly after, he signed for his hometown club Cork City, making his debut in the opening game of the 2002–03 season against Shelbourne in 3–0 home win in which he scored. He went on to form a useful striking partnership with John O'Flynn. Following the arrival of Neale Fenn in 2004, O'Callaghan was moved to midfield by then manager Pat Dolan to accommodate the new player.

In 2005, Cork City picked up their first league title in twelve years, and O'Callaghan picked up a winners medal. He scored eleven goals in all competitions, including in the 2005–06 UEFA Cup, and was also announced as the eircom League Player of the Year for 2005. He also played in the 2005 FAI Cup final defeat to Drogheda United at Lansdowne Road. He also was named as League of Ireland Player of the Year.

In July 2006 he was given time off due to a falling out between himself and manager Damien Richardson. In September 2006, O'Callaghan joined English club Ipswich Town on trial with a view to a permanent deal. He remained training at Ipswich for the following two months, unable to formally sign because of UEFA's transfer window system. In January 2007, the clubs finally negotiated a deal despite strong words on both sides, concluding in an undisclosed fee (speculated to be around £60,000) which saw him sign an 18-month contract with Ipswich. On his full Ipswich debut, he was sent off playing in the FA Cup against Watford, after an alleged stamp on defender Danny Shittu. However, after a successful appeal, O'Callaghan was to escape a further three-match ban. On 7 May 2007, O'Callaghan scored his first goal for the "Tractor Boys" in the 5–1 win over Barnsley.

In August 2007, Ipswich agreed terms with Brighton & Hove Albion to sell O'Callaghan for around £85,000, rising to £105,000 based on appearances. However, this transfer fell through as the club and player were unable to reach an agreement on personal terms. He did, however, move to Withdean on loan until the end of December 2007. He rejected the chance to sign permanently at Brighton, stating that chairman Dick Knight was being unrealistic with the wages he was offering both himself and fellow striker Bas Savage. Both players left the club at the end of December 2007.

In January 2008 he decided to terminate his contract with Ipswich, having played 17 games for the club, manager Jim Magilton explained: "George is a great lad but he's 28 now and needs to be playing regular first-team football. We have not been able to give him that here and we won't stand in his way of moving on now." On 31 January 2008, O'Callaghan returned home to Cork City, signing a three-year deal under new manager Alan Mathews. O'Callaghan debuted in a friendly against Shelbourne on 7 February. He then made his competitive debut against Dungannon Swifts in the Setanta Cup on 26 February, scoring two goals.

After numerous man of the match displays at Cork City, it was announced on 9 July that O'Callaghan, along with ex-teammate Bas Savage, had joined Tranmere Rovers on a two-year contract. However, on 13 February 2009, O'Callaghan had his contract cancelled by Tranmere Rovers after suffering illness and failing to settle at the club. Returning to his native Ireland, O'Callaghan signed for Dundalk in February 2009, scoring against Celtic on his debut. He left the club after just four months.

In July 2009, English club Yeovil Town confirmed won O'Callaghan's signature. On 23 December 2009 it was announced that his contract would not be renewed, after seven starts and five substitute appearances in six months, leaving him without a club. He returned to Cork City for a third time under new boss Roddy Collins. After the departure of Dan Murray, he was named captain. O'Callaghan and the rest of the club's staff became free agents after the winding up of the club in February 2010. He turned out for the club in a pre-season friendly at Crosshaven but decided against playing for his local club due to the uncertainty surrounding their future. George signed for Waterford United on 8 April 2010. He debuted in the away day defeat to Monaghan United. In his second game for the club he scored a 35 yards (32 m) wonder goal against Tramore in the Munster Cup. He scored five goals in the "Blues" 9–0 victory over Tralee Dynamos in the League of Ireland Cup on 11 May 2010, becoming the first Waterford player to score five in a game since Alfie Hale.

At the end of June 2010 George decided to return to Cork City to help the club's attempt to achieve promotion from the First Division. He made his debut on 23 July against Finn Harps. He left the club once again before the end of the year. In February 2011, he joined League One side Brentford on a two-week trial. He signed for Conference National club Cambridge United on non-contract terms in April 2011. However, the club never utilised him in his brief time there. In October 2011, he signed for DPMM FC, the only professional football club in Brunei. He had previously spent a brief period at the club between his time at Port Vale and Cork City. He had decided to leave the club and the country as his family did not enjoy life in the Far East. O'Callaghan signed for Dover Athletic of the Conference South in September 2012.

He came out of retirement to play for Rockmount of the Munster Senior League Senior Premier Division in December 2016.

== Management career ==
O'Callaghan was appointed as manager of Sabah in the Malaysia Premier League in 2014. He was sacked in January 2015, along with Singapore international Fazrul Nawaz, after the pair began missing training sessions.

== Personal life ==
O'Callaghan is the cousin of Donncha O'Callaghan, who played for the Ireland national rugby union team.

O'Callaghan drove through a red light in Cork at 2:40 am on 13 October 2004, and upon his arrest admitted that he had "had seven or eight pints, a few shots and a few cocktails". It took three years before his case went to court, at which point the court handed him a €300 fine and gave him a two-year driving ban; he stated that "I have learned from my mistake".

O'Callaghan pleaded guilty in 2026 to stealing €23,000 between 2020 and 2021 from a fitness centre in Ballincollig. His lawyers said he had had addiction issues at the time.

== Career statistics ==
Appearances and goals by club, season and competition
Club	Season	League			National cup (Note: Includes FA Cup, FAI Cup)		Other		Total	
Club	Season	Division	Apps	Goals	Apps	Goals	Apps	Goals	Apps	Goals
Port Vale	1998–99	Second Division	4	0	1	0	0	0	5	0
Port Vale	1999–2000	Second Division	11	0	0	0	0	0	11	0
Port Vale	2000–01	First Division	8	1	1	0	1	0	10	1
Port Vale	2001–02	First Division	11	3	1	0	3	0	15	3
Port Vale	Total		34	4	3	0	4	0	41	4
Ipswich Town	2006–07	Championship	11	1	1	0	0	0	12	1
Ipswich Town	2007–08	Championship	1	0	0	0	0	0	1	0
Ipswich Town	Total		12	1	1	0	0	0	13	1
Brighton & Hove Albion (loan)	2007–08	League One	14	0	1	0	2	0	17	0
Tranmere Rovers	2008–09	League One	6	0	0	0	2	0	8	0
Dundalk	2009	League of Ireland; Premier Division	11	0	0	0	0	0	11	0
Yeovil Town	2009–10	League One	12	0	1	0	2	0	15	0
Waterford United	2010	League of Ireland; First Division	8	2	0	0	0	0	8	2
Cork City	2010	League of Ireland; First Division	13	0	0	0	0	0	13	0
Dover Athletic	2012–13	Conference South	1	0	0	0	0	0	1	0
Career total			111	7	6	0	10	0	127	7

== Honours ==
Cork City

- Munster Senior Cup: 2003, 2004 & 2005
- League of Ireland: 2005
- FAI Cup runner-up: 2005

Individual

- Port Vale Young Player of the Year: 1997
- League of Ireland Player of the Year: 2005
