= Clive Delaney =

Irish footballer

Personal information
- Date of birth: 2 January 1980 (age 46)
- Place of birth: Dublin, Ireland
- Position: Defender

Senior career*
Years	Team	Apps	(Gls)
1998–2003	UCD	146	(10)
2003	West Ham United	0	(0)
2003	St Patrick's Athletic	?	(2)
2004–2006	Derry City	62	(1)
2007	Bray Wanderers	18	(3)
2008–2009	Derry City	48	(2)

International career
2000	Republic of Ireland U21	1	(0)
1999	Republic of Ireland U18		
- * Club domestic league appearances and goals

Clive Delaney (born 2 January 1980) is an Irish former footballer.

== Career ==
Clive started his career on a scholarship at University College Dublin AFC in 1997 within the club's reserve team, transitioning to the League of Ireland halfway through the season. He played five seasons at UCD and played in the UEFA Intertoto Cup against Bulgarian side Levski Sofia.

Clive was selected for the U18 Irish squad in 1998 and represented Ireland in the UEFA U-19 Championship in Sweden in 1999, where he scored the winning goal as Ireland defeated Greece to win the bronze medal. Clive represented his country at U18, U19 and U21 levels.

In 2002, Clive signed for West Ham United where he became a regular in the Reserve side under Roger Cross, however, was released when the club were relegated to the EFL Championship. He had successful trials at Queens Park Rangers and Mick McCarthy's Sunderland in pre-season 2003/2004, however he chose to return to Ireland to finish his Chartered Accounting qualification and play semi-professional football with St Patrick's Athletic in Dublin.

Clive had two spells at Derry City FC, the first between 2004 and 2006. that included a successful stint in the UEFA European Championships against Gretna, IFK Göteborg and Paris Saint-Germain FC, then again in February 2008, after the successful negotiation of a transfer fee with Bray Wanderers FC, where he captained the side in the 2007/08 season. He played in the 2003 FAI Cup Final, scored in the 2006 Final to take the game to extra time, and captained the Derry City side in 2008 to FAI League Cup success.

Clive emigrated to Australia in 2010 playing in the NSW NPL League for three years before joining amateur club Dunbar Rovers FC, then retiring in 2017 when the club were promoted to the NSW NPL league.

His uncle Leo O'Reilly won League of Ireland championships with Shamrock Rovers and Dundalk in the 1950s and 1960s.

== Honours ==
- FAI Cup
  - Derry City - 2006
- FAI League Cup: 3
  - Derry City - 2005, 2006, 2008
