= 2002–03 in English football =

Football in England
- Season: 2002–03

Men's football
- FA Premier League: Manchester United
- First Division: Portsmouth
- Second Division: Wigan Athletic
- Third Division: Rushden & Diamonds
- Football Conference: Yeovil Town
- FA Cup: Arsenal
- Football League Trophy: Bristol City
- League Cup: Liverpool
- Community Shield: Arsenal

Women's football
- Premier League National Division: Fulham
- Premier League Northern Division: Aston Villa
- Premier League Southern Division: Bristol Rovers
- FA Women's Cup: Fulham
- Premier League Cup: Fulham

The 2002–03 season was the 123rd season of competitive football in England. In this season, Premier League was won by Manchester United, FA Cup was won by Arsenal.

== Overview ==
- Wigan Athletic marked their 25th season of Football League membership by winning the Division Two championship and reaching the league's second tier for the very first time.
- Sheffield Wednesday was demoted to Division Two, just ten years after reaching the finals of both domestic cup competitions and eleven years after coming two places short of the league title.

== Diary of the season ==
- 27 June 2002 – Leeds United sack manager David O'Leary after four years in charge. The sacking is thought by many to be down to a combination of both spending more than £100 million on players but never winning a trophy and the publication of his book "Leeds United on Trial", detailing his experiences as manager during the previous season when both Lee Bowyer and Johnathan Woodgate had been on trial for assault.
- 3 July 2002 – Middlesbrough pay a club record £8.15million for Empoli and Italy striker Massimo Maccarone.
- 8 July 2002 – Leeds United appoint Terry Venables as their new manager.
- 10 July 2002 – AFC Wimbledon, a club founded by former supporters of Wimbledon following The FA's approval of the latter club's move to Milton Keynes, play their first match, losing 4–0 in a preseason friendly to Sutton United in front of over 4,600 fans.
- 11 July 2002 – Arsenal sign defender Pascal Cygan from Lille for £2.1million.
- 12 July 2002 – Newcastle United sign 20-year-old defender Titus Bramble from Ipswich Town for £5million.
- 22 July 2002 – Manchester United break the English transfer record for the third time in just over a year. They pay Leeds United £29 million for central defender Rio Ferdinand, amidst reports that the Yorkshire club are in severe financial difficulties after overspending during the previous 3 seasons, and having a crippling loan debt.
- 24 July 2002 – Everton sign Arsenal goalkeeper Richard Wright for £3.5million.
- 26 July 2002 – Manchester United sell out-of-favour striker Dwight Yorke to Blackburn Rovers for £2million, with Graeme Souness partnering Yorke with his former Manchester United strike partner Andy Cole.
- 30 July 2002 – Birmingham City, newly promoted to the Premier League, pay a club record £4.25million for Crystal Palace striker Clinton Morrison.
- 2 August 2002 – Juninho signs for Middlesbrough for the third time in a £6million move from Atlético Madrid.
- 4 August 2002 – Leicester City move into their new 32,500-seat Walkers Stadium after 111 years at Filbert Street. They drew 1–1 in a friendly with Athletic Bilbao.
- 5 August 2002 – Middlesbrough sign Aston Villa midfielder George Boateng for £5million.
- 7 August 2002 – Players' Union chairman Gordon Taylor calls for the Football League, currently in a financial crisis following the collapse of ITV Digital, to combine with the 12 Scottish Premier League clubs to form an expanded Football League. There has recently been talk of Rangers and Celtic resigning from the Scottish Premier League to join Division One of the English league, and for several years it has frequently been suggested by various sources that the two clubs should join the Premier League.
- 8 August 2002 – Leeds United sign Liverpool midfielder Nick Barmby for £2.75million.
- 15 August 2002 – Liverpool sell defender Stephen Wright to Sunderland for £3million.
- 17 August 2002 – The FA Premier League season begins. West Bromwich Albion's first top division game for 17 years ends in a 1–0 away defeat to Manchester United.
- 21 August 2002 – Sunderland sign Leicester City midfielder Matt Piper for £3.5million.
- 29 August 2002 – Lee Hughes rejoins West Bromwich Albion for £2.5million after a year at Coventry City, and is joined for £2.25million by Tranmere Rovers midfielder Jason Koumas.
- 30 August 2002 – Sunderland sign striker Marcus Stewart from Ipswich Town for £3.25million.
- 31 August 2002
  - Leeds United sell striker Robbie Keane to Tottenham Hotspur for £7 million, as Glenn Hoddle's team look to push for the Premier League title after three wins and a draw from their opening four games take them to the top of the league as August draws to a close. Arsenal (defending champions), Liverpool, Leeds United and Charlton Athletic complete the top five. Bolton Wanderers, who have lost both of their games this month, prop up the top flight, while winless West Ham United and Southampton complete the bottom three. Sunderland pay a club record £6.75million for Rangers striker Tore Andre Flo. West Bromwich Albion beat Fulham 1–0 to record their first top division win since March 1986.
  - Portsmouth, who were generally not considered as serious promotion challenge, are the surprise leaders of Division One, with their nearest competition coming from last season's beaten playoff finalists Norwich City. Leicester City, Wolverhampton Wanderers, Rotherham United and Nottingham Forest complete the top six.
- 10 September 2002
  - Sunderland sign goalkeeper Mart Poom from Derby County for £2.5million.
  - A Kevin Nolan goal gives Bolton Wanderers a surprise 1–0 league win over Manchester United at Old Trafford.
- 14 September 2002 – Manchester United's dismal start to the season continues as they lose 1–0 at Leeds United. They are now ninth in the league, one place below a newly promoted West Bromwich Albion side who have achieved three consecutive league wins.
- 16 September 2002 – Birmingham City beat Aston Villa 3–0 at St Andrew's in the first Second City derby in the league for 15 years, and the first in the top flight for 17 years.
- 17 September 2002 – After a slow start to the season, the pressure is growing on Sunderland manager Peter Reid. The Daily Mirror tips George Graham to be named as Sunderland manager if Reid is ousted.
- 21 September 2002 – Ruud van Nistelrooy scores the winning goal from the penalty spot as Manchester United get back on track with a 1–0 home league win over Tottenham.
- 23 September 2002 – Peter Reid gains unexpected support from Sir Bobby Robson, manager of Sunderland's local rivals Newcastle United, who defends him over the club's recent shortcomings.
- 26 September 2002 – A poll among Sunderland supporters names David O'Leary as the man they would most like to see as manager in place of under-fire Peter Reid.
- 30 September 2002 – September finishes with defending champions Arsenal top of the Premier League, two points ahead of second-placed Liverpool. Manchester United, held back by two defeats this month, are fourth in the league and level on points with third-placed Middlesbrough who are mounting a surprise title challenge. Chelsea occupy fifth place, with last month's leaders Tottenham Hotspur now down to sixth. West Ham United, Charlton Athletic and Southampton occupy the bottom three places. Portsmouth and Leicester City lead the way in Division One, with the playoff zone being occupied by Norwich City, Nottingham Forest, Rotherham United and Sheffield United.
- 7 October 2002 – Peter Reid is sacked by FA Premier League strugglers Sunderland after seven-and-a-half years in charge.
- 9 October 2002 – Republic of Ireland manager Mick McCarthy is named as a contender for the Sunderland manager's job.
- 10 October 2002 – After just four months as manager of Stoke City, manager Steve Cotterill leaves the club with a statement revealing that he has agreed to take a role at another club, sparking speculation that he has been appointed as Sunderland's new manager. Hours later, however, it was revealed that Howard Wilkinson has ended his five-year role as technical director of The Football Association to become Sunderland's new manager, with Cotterill as his assistant.
- 12 October 2002 – England open their Euro 2004 qualifying series with a 2–1 win over Slovakia in Bratislava. David Beckham and Michael Owen score for England.
- 19 October 2002 – Everton striker Wayne Rooney becomes the youngest-ever goalscorer in FA Premier League history when he scores a last-minute winner against Arsenal, five days before his 17th birthday, to end the opposition's 30-match unbeaten Premiership run. West Ham United winger Trevor Sinclair takes the pressure off his manager Glenn Roeder by scoring the only goal in an away league win over Sunderland, who are playing their first game under the management of Howard Wilkinson.
- 26 October 2002 – After waiting 12 years to renew old rivalries, Andrew Johnson scores a hat-trick as Crystal Palace crush Brighton 5–0 in a Division One game at Selhurst Park.
- 27 October 2002 – James Beattie scores a hat-trick as Southampton beat Fulham 4–2 in the league at St Mary's Stadium.
- 30 October 2002 – Adam Crozier announced his resignation as chief executive of The Football Association after two years in this role.
- 31 October 2002 – October draws to a close with Liverpool having leapfrogged Arsenal into second place, opening up a four-point gap and looking in a stronger position than ever before to end their league title wait that began in 1990. Chelsea, Manchester United and Tottenham Hotspur complete the top five. Bolton Wanderers, Sunderland and West Bromwich Albion occupy the three relegation places. Portsmouth now have a seven-point lead over nearest rivals Leicester City at the top of Division One. The play-off zone is occupied by Norwich City, Sheffield United, Watford and Nottingham Forest.
- 9 November 2002 – A Shaun Goater double sees Manchester City beat Manchester United 3–1 in the last Manchester derby at Maine Road. It is the first time since September 1989 that City have beaten United in a competitive game, and the first time since March 1993 that United have failed to beat City at Maine Road.
- 10 November 2002 – Sunderland achieve their first league win under Howard Wilkinson by beating Tottenham 2–0 at the Stadium of Light.
- 18 December 2002 – Football mourns the deaths of Football Association chairman Sir Bert Millichip, 88, and former Leicester City and Shrewsbury Town striker Arthur Rowley, 76, who scored a record 434 English league goals during his 19-year career.
- 23 November 2002 – Ruud van Nistelrooy scores a hat-trick as Manchester United end a dismal run of league form by beating Newcastle United 5–3 at Old Trafford.
- 30 November 2002 – As November draws to a close, Liverpool are on a dismal run of form which has seen Arsenal overtake them into first place in the Premier League by a single point. Everton are putting up a surprise title challenge after more than a decade of mediocrity as they occupy third place and are just three points off the top. Chelsea and Manchester United complete the top five. West Ham United, West Bromwich Albion and Bolton Wanderers finish the month in the relegation zone. Portsmouth and Leicester City continue to lead the way in Division One. Nottingham Forest, Norwich City, Reading (newly promoted) and Sheffield United complete the top six.
- 7 December 2002 – Manchester United's revival continues with a 2–0 home league win over defending champions Arsenal.
- 14 December 2002 – Manchester United continue to close in on the top of the table with a 3–0 home win over West Ham. Sunderland boost their survival challenge with a 2–1 home win over Liverpool, whose title challenge is continuing to fall away. Marc-Vivien Foé scores twice for Manchester City in a 2–2 draw at Charlton Athletic.
- 26 December 2002 – Hull City celebrate their first competitive game at their new Kingston Communications Stadium with a 2–0 win over Hartlepool United in Division Three.
- 31 December 2002 – 2002 ends with Arsenal top of the Premier League, four points ahead of second-placed Chelsea and with a game in hand. Manchester United occupy third place, Everton are fourth and Liverpool have declined to fifth place just two months after they had a comfortable lead at the top. Southampton's recent resurgence is putting pressure on the top five as they occupy seventh place and look on course for their highest finish since 1995. West Ham United remain bottom and are still looking for their first home win of the season, while West Bromwich Albion and Sunderland complete the bottom three. Portsmouth and Leicester City's two-horse race at the top of Division One continues, with the playoff zone unchanged from last month.
- 4 January 2003 – Shrewsbury Town beat Everton 2–1 in an FA Cup third round tie at Gay Meadow.
- 12 January 2003 – Robbie Keane scores a hat-trick as Tottenham beat Everton 4–3 in the league at White Hart Lane.
- 19 January 2003 – Thierry Henry scores a hat-trick as Arsenal beat West Ham United 3–1 at Highbury.
- 30 January 2003 – Still struggling with debt, Leeds United sell Robbie Fowler to Manchester City for £6million.
- 31 January 2003 – January draws to a close with Arsenal still top of the Premier League, two points above second placed Manchester United and within a game in hand. Newcastle United, Chelsea and Everton complete the top five. Liverpool's decline continues as they occupy eighth place, deepening fears that a side looking all set for title glory three months ago might now not even qualify for the UEFA Cup. Meanwhile, West Bromwich Albion's dismal form continues as they and West Ham United prop up the rest of the top flight on goal difference. Sunderland occupy the last relegation place. Middlesbrough boost their bid for a UEFA Cup place by spending a total of £8.5million on new signings Chris Riggott, Malcolm Christie and Michael Ricketts. The true extent of Leeds United's financial difficulties becomes public knowledge during a press conference to announce the sale of Jonathan Woodgate to Newcastle United for £9million, during which Terry Venables states that he had been assured players wouldn't need to be sold. Portsmouth and Leicester City remain in pole position at the top of Division One, and apart from Coventry City edging Reading out of the playoff zone the top six of the division is unchanged from last month.
- 9 February 2003 – Manchester United drop two priceless points in the Premier League title race as they can only manage a 1–1 draw with City in the Manchester derby at Old Trafford. It is the first time since the 1991–92 season that they have failed to beat City in either derby games.
- 12 February 2003 – A record of eight black players are capped in the England side's 3–1 home defeated by Australia at Upton Park.
- 16 February 2003 – One of the most decisive games of the season sees Arsenal cancel out Manchester United in the double race with a 2–0 win at Old Trafford. After the game, David Beckham suffers a gash to his face which is reportedly the result of Sir Alex Ferguson throwing a basket full of boots across the changing room after his side's defeat.
- 22 February 2003 – Manchester United drop points once again when relegation threatened Bolton hold them to a 1–1 draw at the Reebok Stadium.
- 28 February 2003 – The month-end leaders for February are Arsenal, who now lead Manchester United by five points. Newcastle United, Chelsea and Everton complete the top five. There will now be a place in the UEFA Cup for the Premier League's sixth place team if Manchester United or Liverpool (who contest this weekend's League Cup final) finish in the top five. Currently in sixth place are Charlton Athletic, while Liverpool are still only seventh in a division which they had looked set to win a few months ago. Portsmouth have a two-point lead over Leicester City at the top of Division One. Reading, Nottingham Forest and Sheffield United remain in the playoff zone, but an improving Wolverhampton Wanderers side have edged Norwich City out of the top six. Rotherham United are in contention for promotion after an impressive season so far.
- 2 March 2003 – Liverpool win the League Cup for the seventh time in their history thanks to a 2–0 win over Manchester United in the final at Millennium Stadium in Cardiff. On the same day, Arsenal establish an eight-point lead at the top of the league and look all set for a second successive league title.
- 5 March 2003 – Manchester United cut Arsenal's Premier League lead to five points with a 2–1 home win over struggling Leeds United.
- 10 March 2003 – Howard Wilkinson is sacked as Sunderland manager (along with his assistant Steve Cotterill) after his team won just two out of 20 Premiership matches under his management. The hunt for his successor begins, with Mick McCarthy, David O'Leary and George Burley the three names being particularly strongly linked with the vacancy.
- 12 March 2003 – Sunderland appoint former Republic of Ireland national coach Mick McCarthy as their new manager.
- 15 March 2003 – Arsenal are now just two points ahead of Manchester United at the top of the league, after they lose 2–0 at Blackburn and their rivals win 1–0 at Aston Villa.
- 19 March 2003 – Two goals in three minutes for Forest sets them on their way to a 3–0 victory over Derby County.
- 21 March 2003 – Leeds United, 16th in the FA Premier League and £120million in debt, sack Terry Venables after eight months in charge. Peter Reid is named as his successor on a temporary contract until the end of the season, but it is far from clear whether Reid will get the job on a permanent basis.
- 22 March 2003
  - Derby County (in Division One) suspend manager John Gregory over allegations of misconduct and replace him with George Burley as interim manager.
  - Manchester United beat Fulham 3–0 at Old Trafford, with Ruud van Nistelrooy scoring all three goals, to go top of the Premier League just three weeks after their title hopes had appeared dead.
- 23 March 2003 – Arsenal return to the top of the Premier League with a narrow 2–1 win over Everton.
- 31 March 2003 – March draws to a close with Manchester United now leading the Premier League just a month after Arsenal looked to have won it, though Arsène Wenger's team are only a point behind with a game in hand. Three points now separate Portsmouth and Leicester City at the top of Division One. Sheffield United, Reading, Nottingham Forest and Wolverhampton Wanderers remain in the play-off zone. Ipswich Town's resurgence has seen them creep to the fringe of the top six, but Rotherham United's playoff hopes are evaporating.
- 5 April 2003 – Manchester United seize the initiative in the title challenge by beating Liverpool 4–0 at Old Trafford as Arsenal can only manage a 1–1 draw at Aston Villa. Leeds United move closer to survival with a 6–1 away win over a Charlton side which effectively ends their opposition's hopes of European qualification.
- 12 April 2003 – Paul Scholes scores a hat-trick as Manchester United beat Newcastle United 6–2 on Tyneside to extend their lead at the top of the Premier League. Newcastle's neighbours Sunderland's relegation is confirmed by a 2–0 defeat at Birmingham City.
- 16 April 2003 – The much-anticipated "title decider" between Arsenal and Manchester United at Highbury ends in a 2–2 draw, meaning that Arsenal are now three points behind Manchester United but with a game in hand and a remotely superior goal difference.
- 19 April 2003 – Paul Scholes is on the scoresheet twice as a 3–1 home win over Blackburn Rovers edges Manchester United closer to their eighth Premier League title in 11 seasons, despite Arsenal's 2–0 win at Middlesbrough. West Bromwich Albion are relegated despite a 2–1 away win over already relegated Sunderland. Leicester City seal promotion to the Premier League with a 2–0 win over Brighton.
- 21 April 2003 – West Ham manager Glenn Roeder is hospitalised with a suspected stroke; director of football Trevor Brooking is placed in charge of the first team until Roeder is well enough to resume control.
- 26 April 2003 – Arsenal suffer a huge blow to their double hopes, as they surrender a 2–0 lead in their game-in-hand to draw 2–2 with Bolton at the Reebok Stadium – well and truly shifting the title race in Manchester United's favour with three games to go.
- 27 April 2003 – Portsmouth defeated Rotherham 3–2 to win the Division One championship and gain promotion to the Premier League for the first time since the league's inception. Apart from the 1987–88 season, they have not played top division football since the 1950s. On the same day, Alan Shearer receives the Premier League "Player of the Decade" award at a PFA ceremony.
- 29 April 2003 – Glenn Roeder's illness is diagnosed as a brain tumour which will be operated upon shortly.
- 30 April 2003 – Sunderland, without a point since January and win since December, end the month, and West Bromwich Albion, with only six wins in their first top division campaign for nearly 20 years, end April with their relegation battle lost. West Ham United complete the Premier League bottom three but their survival bid is still very much alive as they are posing a threat to Bolton Wanderers, Birmingham City, Fulham, Aston Villa and a Leeds United team who began the season among the teams expected to challenge for the title but are now battling relegation as well as huge debts.
- 3 May 2003 – A Ruud van Nistelrooy hat-trick contributes to Manchester United's 4–1 home win over Charlton Athletic and puts them on the brink of title glory.
- 4 May 2003 – Arsenal lose 3–2 at home to Leeds United, a result which ensures Leeds United's safety and ends Arsenal's defence of the title. Manchester United are crowned league champions for the eighth time in 11 seasons. Sunderland are relegated from the Premier League with a record low of 4 wins, 19 points and 21 goals. Shrewsbury Town are relegated to the Conference, ending 53 years of Football League membership. Exeter City finished 23rd in Division Three and are also relegated to the Conference – the first club to suffer automatic relegation without finishing bottom of the league. Peter Schmeichel calls time on his footballing career six months before his 40th birthday after helping Manchester City to finish ninth in the Premiership.
- 9 May 2003 – Derby County confirm that suspended manager John Gregory will not be returning, and his contract is terminated to make way for George Burley to receive the job on a permanent basis.
- 11 May 2003 – West Ham United are relegated after 10 years in the Premier League after failing to get the better of a Birmingham side who hold them to a 2–2 draw. Bolton are safe after a 2–1 home win over Middlesbrough. Sunderland's 4–0 home defeat to Arsenal sees them end the season as officially the worst Premier League team ever with a record low of four wins, 19 points and 21 goals. Not since Stoke City in the old First Division 18 years ago has any top flight club attained such a poor record in the top flight. Ninth-placed Manchester City bid farewell to Maine Road after 80 years, their last game before relocation to the City of Manchester Stadium being watched by a 35,000 capacity crowd as they lost 1–0 to eighth placed Southampton. The final goal at the stadium is scored by Saints defender Michael Svensson.
- 17 May 2003 – Arsenal ease their Premier League disappointment by winning the FA Cup for the ninth time in their history, beating Southampton 1–0 at the Millennium Stadium courtesy of a first-half Robert Pires goal.
- 22 May 2003 – Everton sign Joseph Yobo from Olympique Marseille for £3.5million.
- 26 May 2003 – Wolverhampton Wanderers return to the top flight after a 19-year exile by beating Sheffield United 3–0 in the Division One play-off final.
- 4 June 2003 – After 13 years as goalkeeper for Arsenal, David Seaman joins Manchester City on a free transfer, signing a one-year contract.
- 17 June 2003 – David Beckham agrees to join Real Madrid in a £25 million deal after 12 years at Manchester United.
- 26 June 2003 – Marc-Vivien Foé, who spent the 2002–03 season on loan to Manchester City, collapses and dies at the age of 28 during a Confederations Cup tie for Cameroon.

== England national team ==
Date	Venue	Opponents	Score	Competition	England scorers
7 September 2002	Villa Park, Birmingham	Portugal	1–1	F	Alan Smith
12 October 2002	Tehelné pole, Bratislava	Slovakia	2–1	ECQ	David Beckham, Michael Owen
16 October 2002	St Mary's Stadium, Southampton	Macedonia	2–2	ECQ	David Beckham, Steven Gerrard
12 February 2003	Upton Park, London	Australia	1–3	F	Francis Jeffers
29 March 2003	Rheinpark Stadion, Vaduz	Liechtenstein	2–0	ECQ	Michael Owen, David Beckham
2 April 2003	Stadium of Light, Sunderland	Turkey	2–0	ECQ	Darius Vassell, David Beckham
22 May 2003	Kings Park Stadium, Durban	South Africa	2–1	F	Gareth Southgate, Emile Heskey
3 June 2003	Walkers Stadium, Leicester	Serbia and Montenegro	2–1	F	Steven Gerrard, Joe Cole
11 June 2003	Riverside Stadium, Middlesbrough	Slovakia	2–1	ECQ	Michael Owen (2)

Key: ECQ = 2004 European Championship qualifiers, F = Friendly; scores are written England first

== European club competitions ==
=== UEFA Champions League ===
- Manchester United – quarter-finals
- Arsenal – Second group phase
- Newcastle United – Second group phase
- Liverpool – First group phase (dropped into UEFA Cup)

=== UEFA Cup ===
- Liverpool – quarter-finals
- Fulham – third round
- Leeds United – third round
- Blackburn Rovers – second round
- Chelsea – first round
- Ipswich Town – second round

=== UEFA Intertoto Cup ===
- Fulham – winners (qualified for UEFA Cup)
- Aston Villa – semi-finals

== Honours ==
Competition	Winners
FA Premier League	Manchester United
FA Cup	Arsenal
Worthington Cup	Liverpool
Football League Division One	Portsmouth
Football League Division Two	Wigan Athletic
Football League Division Three	Rushden & Diamonds
Football League Trophy	Bristol City
FA Trophy	Burscough
FA Vase	Brigg Town
FA Youth Cup	Manchester United

== League competitions ==
=== FA Premier League ===
Manchester United, unbeaten in the league after 26 December, overhauled Arsenal during the final three months of the season to clinch their eighth Premiership title in 11 seasons, while the other two Champions League places went to Newcastle United and Chelsea. Going into the UEFA Cup were Liverpool (who made an excellent start to the league, going unbeaten in their first three months before a sudden collapse and falling to 7th but with a late good form to finish 5th) and Blackburn Rovers who were bouncing in mid table at February, although they missed out on Champions League qualification thanks to staying in mid table for a long time, finished 6th, along with FA Cup runners-up Southampton (who also achieved their best Premiership finish of 8th place) and Fair Play award winners Manchester City (who finished an impressive ninth on their Premiership comeback). Southampton had not played in European competitions for nearly 20 years, while Manchester City's last European campaign was a quarter of a century ago.

Everton finished seventh in their first full season under the management of David Moyes, the club's highest finish for seven years, in a campaign where the club was the centre of national media and public attention following the performances of 17-year-old striker Wayne Rooney, who became the youngest full England international after the season's end.

Compensation for Arsenal after their spectacular failure to retain the league title came in the form of retaining the FA Cup – the first side to do so for 21 years.

Leeds United's season was plagued by a loss of form and mounting debts, and having to sell several key players, as they slipped to 15th place – their lowest finish for 10 years and a stark contrast to the previous five campaigns, where they had never finished outside the top five. Manager Terry Venables was axed towards the end of March after eight months in charge, with Peter Reid taking over for the final weeks of the season to secure survival and earn himself a permanent contract. Aston Villa's 16th-place finish was their lowest for eight years, although their strong home form ensured their survival in the Premier League. However, they sat above Blackburn Rovers in February but only poor form at the end prevented them from qualifying for the UEFA Cup.

Sunderland's season started badly and got worse as they finished with a record Premiership low of 4 wins, 19 points and 21 goals, losing their final 15 league games in the process. The Wearside club went through three managers, with Peter Reid (one of the league's longest-serving managers) leaving in early October to be replaced by Howard Wilkinson, who lasted just five months before Mick McCarthy was appointed. They were joined by West Bromwich Albion, who attained just 26 points in their first top flight season for nearly 20 years and won just three times in the league after September. Last to go down were West Ham United, who went down with 42 points – the highest points tally of any club to be relegated from the Premiership under the 20-club format.

Pos	Team	Pld	W	D	L	GF	GA	GD	Pts	Qualification or relegation
1	Manchester United (C)	38	25	8	5	74	34	+40	83	Qualification for the Champions League group stage
2	Arsenal	38	23	9	6	85	42	+43	78	Qualification for the Champions League group stage
3	Newcastle United	38	21	6	11	63	48	+15	69	Qualification for the Champions League third qualifying round
4	Chelsea	38	19	10	9	68	38	+30	67	Qualification for the Champions League third qualifying round
5	Liverpool	38	18	10	10	61	41	+20	64	Qualification for the UEFA Cup first round (Note: Since Liverpool qualified for the UEFA Cup via the league, their place in the UEFA Cup as League Cup winners reverted to the league and was awarded to Blackburn Rovers as the highest-placed team not already qualified for European competitions.)
6	Blackburn Rovers	38	16	12	10	52	43	+9	60	Qualification for the UEFA Cup first round
7	Everton	38	17	8	13	48	49	−1	59	
8	Southampton	38	13	13	12	43	46	−3	52	Qualification for the UEFA Cup first round (Note: Since Arsenal qualified for the Champions League, their place in the UEFA Cup as FA Cup winners went to Southampton, who were the FA Cup runners-up.)
9	Manchester City	38	15	6	17	47	54	−7	51	Qualification for the UEFA Cup qualifying round (Note: Manchester City qualified as the highest-ranked team not already qualified for European competitions of Premiership Fair Play League by The Football Association, the top association among UEFA Fair Play ranking winners.)
10	Tottenham Hotspur	38	14	8	16	51	62	−11	50	
11	Middlesbrough	38	13	10	15	48	44	+4	49	
12	Charlton Athletic	38	14	7	17	45	56	−11	49	
13	Birmingham City	38	13	9	16	41	49	−8	48	
14	Fulham	38	13	9	16	41	50	−9	48	
15	Leeds United	38	14	5	19	58	57	+1	47	
16	Aston Villa	38	12	9	17	42	47	−5	45	
17	Bolton Wanderers	38	10	14	14	41	51	−10	44	
18	West Ham United (R)	38	10	12	16	42	59	−17	42	Relegation to Football League First Division
19	West Bromwich Albion (R)	38	6	8	24	29	65	−36	26	Relegation to Football League First Division
20	Sunderland (R)	38	4	7	27	21	65	−44	19	Relegation to Football League First Division

Source: Premier League
Rules for classification: 1) points; 2) goal difference; 3) number of goals scored.
(C) Champions; (R) Relegated
Notes:

Leading goalscorer: Ruud van Nistelrooy (Manchester United), 25

=== Football League First Division ===
Portsmouth won the Division One title by some distance, passing manager Harry Redknapp's old club, West Ham, on the way down and ending their own 15-year exile from the top flight. They were rarely outside the top two at any point of the season.

Leicester City earned a somewhat controversial promotion, as administration and a Creditor's Voluntary Agreement wrote off much of their £30million debt. Partly as a result of this, the League would introduce a 10-point subtraction for any teams entering administration from the next season onwards (though they still would have been automatically promoted had it been applied this season). The play-offs were won by Wolves, returning to the top flight after nearly 20 years and finally allowing owner Sir Jack Hayward to see the return he wanted on his years of investment. Their opponents, Sheffield United, were semi-finalists in both domestic cups.

Gillingham enjoyed their most successful season to date, finishing a club record eleventh place in the division, the highest in their history. Despite having some of the lowest attendances in senior football after the relocation to Milton Keynes was announced, Wimbledon managed a 10th-place finish in the league, but then went into administration – putting the future of the club under yet more doubt.

Grimsby were relegated, after struggling in the division for five years on extremely limited resources. Both Brighton and Sheffield Wednesday suffered awful starts to the season (Brighton managing only a single win from their first sixteen matches), and despite good runs of form late in the season, neither were able to survive, although Brighton at least had the satisfaction of staying in the hunt for survival up to the last game.

Pos	Team	Pld	W	D	L	GF	GA	GD	Pts	Promotion or relegation
1	Portsmouth (C, P)	46	29	11	6	97	45	+52	98	Promotion to 2003–04 FA Premier League
2	Leicester City (P)	46	26	14	6	73	40	+33	92	Promotion to 2003–04 FA Premier League
3	Sheffield United	46	23	11	12	72	52	+20	80	Qualification for First Division Playoffs
4	Reading	46	25	4	17	61	46	+15	79	Qualification for First Division Playoffs
5	Wolverhampton Wanderers (O, P)	46	20	16	10	81	44	+37	76	Qualification for First Division Playoffs
6	Nottingham Forest	46	20	14	12	82	50	+32	74	Qualification for First Division Playoffs
7	Ipswich Town	46	19	13	14	80	64	+16	70	
8	Norwich City	46	19	12	15	60	49	+11	69	
9	Millwall	46	19	9	18	59	69	−10	66	
10	Wimbledon	46	18	11	17	76	73	+3	65	
11	Gillingham	46	16	14	16	56	65	−9	62	
12	Preston North End	46	16	13	17	68	70	−2	61	
13	Watford	46	17	9	20	54	70	−16	60	
14	Crystal Palace	46	14	17	15	59	52	+7	59	
15	Rotherham United	46	15	14	17	62	62	0	59	
16	Burnley	46	15	10	21	65	89	−24	55	
17	Walsall	46	15	9	22	57	69	−12	54	
18	Derby County	46	15	7	24	55	74	−19	52	
19	Bradford City	46	14	10	22	51	73	−22	52	
20	Coventry City	46	12	14	20	46	62	−16	50	
21	Stoke City	46	12	14	20	45	69	−24	50	
22	Sheffield Wednesday (R)	46	10	16	20	56	73	−17	46	Relegation to 2003–04 Second Division
23	Brighton & Hove Albion (R)	46	11	12	23	49	67	−18	45	Relegation to 2003–04 Second Division
24	Grimsby Town (R)	46	9	12	25	48	85	−37	39	Relegation to 2003–04 Second Division

Updated to match(es) played on 11 May 2003. Source: Soccerway
Rules for classification: 1) points; 2) goal difference; 3) number of goals scored.
(C) Champions; (O) Play-off winners; (P) Promoted; (R) Relegated

Leading goalscorer: Svetoslav Todorov (Portsmouth), 26

=== Football League Second Division ===
Tranmere Rovers had to settle for seventh place – not even enough for a playoff place – despite collecting 80 points, a tally which at times had been enough for some teams to win automatic promotion. Plymouth Argyle and Luton Town both achieved top half finishes a season after promotion.

A managerial change mid-season helped send Northampton down. Mansfield Town's first season out of the bottom division in over a decade ended as their previous spell had; with immediate relegation in a season awash with over 160 goals where they had no problems scoring goals but unfortunately leaked goals at an alarming rate. Huddersfield started badly, and a financial crisis later in the season helped condemn them to relegation, only three years after they looked Premiership-bound. Cheltenham came close to survival, but a defeat on the final day of the season saw them return to Division Three.

Pos	Team	Pld	W	D	L	GF	GA	GD	Pts	Promotion or relegation
1	Wigan Athletic (C, P)	46	29	13	4	68	25	+43	100	Promotion to Football League First Division
2	Crewe Alexandra (P)	46	25	11	10	76	40	+36	86	Promotion to Football League First Division
3	Bristol City	46	24	11	11	79	48	+31	83	Qualification for the Second Division play-offs
4	Queens Park Rangers	46	24	11	11	69	45	+24	83	Qualification for the Second Division play-offs
5	Oldham Athletic	46	22	16	8	68	38	+30	82	Qualification for the Second Division play-offs
6	Cardiff City (O, P)	46	23	12	11	68	43	+25	81	Qualification for the Second Division play-offs
7	Tranmere Rovers	46	23	11	12	66	57	+9	80	
8	Plymouth Argyle	46	17	14	15	63	52	+11	65	
9	Luton Town	46	17	14	15	67	62	+5	65	
10	Swindon Town	46	16	12	18	59	63	−4	60	
11	Peterborough United	46	14	16	16	51	54	−3	58	
12	Colchester United	46	14	16	16	52	56	−4	58	
13	Blackpool	46	15	13	18	56	64	−8	58	
14	Stockport County	46	15	10	21	65	70	−5	55	
15	Notts County	46	13	16	17	62	70	−8	55	
16	Brentford	46	14	12	20	47	56	−9	54	
17	Port Vale	46	14	11	21	54	70	−16	53	
18	Wycombe Wanderers	46	13	13	20	59	66	−7	52	
19	Barnsley	46	13	13	20	51	64	−13	52	
20	Chesterfield	46	14	8	24	43	73	−30	50	
21	Cheltenham Town (R)	46	10	18	18	53	68	−15	48	Relegation to Football League Third Division
22	Huddersfield Town (R)	46	11	12	23	39	61	−22	45	Relegation to Football League Third Division
23	Mansfield Town (R)	46	12	8	26	66	97	−31	44	Relegation to Football League Third Division
24	Northampton Town (R)	46	10	9	27	40	79	−39	39	Relegation to Football League Third Division

Rules for classification: In the Football League goals scored (GF) takes precedence over goal difference (GD).
(C) Champions; (O) Play-off winners; (P) Promoted; (R) Relegated

Leading goalscorer: Robert Earnshaw (Cardiff City), 31

=== Football League Third Division ===
Rushden & Diamonds continued their meteoric rise, winning the divisional title. They were helped in no small part by runners-up Hartlepool suffering a shocking late-season collapse, which cost them the title and manager Mike Newell his job. Wrexham took the last automatic promotion spot and bounced back from the previous season's relegation, as did play-off winners AFC Bournemouth, who beat Lincoln City in the final.

Oxford United were promotion contenders a season after finishing fourth from bottom, but in the end just missed out on the playoffs. Despite almost going out of business, York City managed to finish 10th – their highest finish since relegation to Division Three in 1999. Hull City finished 13th under new manager Peter Taylor, who took over from Jan Molby just before the club completed its relocation from Boothferry Park to the new KC Stadium, which gave the club the highest crowds at this level, although the upturn in form was not enough to get them anywhere near the top of the table. Boston United managed a 15th-place finish in their first season as a league club, despite having four points deducted for financial irregularities.

A shock FA Cup victory over Everton did little to help Shrewsbury, and they finished bottom of the League. Exeter City were bought out pre-season in a high-profile takeover spearheaded by Uri Geller; unfortunately, Geller's associates proceeded to asset-strip the club, and despite a late-season run of form, Exeter fell victim to the first-ever dual relegation from the League.

Yeovil Town, who had spent decades making the headlines by defeating league opposition in the FA Cup, finally reached the Football League as Conference champions. The first Conference playoffs were won by Doncaster Rovers, who returned to the league after a five-year exile with the financial backing of John Ryan, who now had a new all-seater stadium in the pipeline.

Pos	Team	Pld	W	D	L	GF	GA	GD	Pts	Promotion or relegation
1	Rushden & Diamonds (C, P)	46	24	15	7	73	47	+26	87	Promotion to Football League Second Division
2	Hartlepool United (P)	46	24	13	9	71	51	+20	85	Promotion to Football League Second Division
3	Wrexham (P)	46	23	15	8	84	50	+34	84	Promotion to Football League Second Division
4	Bournemouth (O, P)	46	20	14	12	60	48	+12	74	Qualification for the Third Division play-offs
5	Scunthorpe United	46	19	15	12	68	49	+19	72	Qualification for the Third Division play-offs
6	Lincoln City	46	18	16	12	46	37	+9	70	Qualification for the Third Division play-offs
7	Bury	46	18	16	12	57	56	+1	70	Qualification for the Third Division play-offs
8	Oxford United	46	19	12	15	57	47	+10	69	
9	Torquay United	46	16	18	12	71	71	0	66	
10	York City	46	17	15	14	52	53	−1	66	
11	Kidderminster Harriers	46	16	15	15	62	63	−1	63	
12	Cambridge United	46	16	13	17	67	70	−3	61	
13	Hull City	46	14	17	15	58	53	+5	59	
14	Darlington	46	12	18	16	58	59	−1	54	
15	Boston United	46	15	13	18	55	56	−1	54 (Note: Boston United had 4 points deducted for financial irregularities.)	
16	Macclesfield Town	46	14	12	20	57	63	−6	54	
17	Southend United	46	17	3	26	47	59	−12	54	
18	Leyton Orient	46	14	11	21	51	61	−10	53	
19	Rochdale	46	12	16	18	63	70	−7	52	
20	Bristol Rovers	46	12	15	19	50	57	−7	51	
21	Swansea City	46	12	13	21	48	65	−17	49	
22	Carlisle United	46	13	10	23	52	78	−26	49	
23	Exeter City (R)	46	11	15	20	50	64	−14	48	Relegation to Football Conference
24	Shrewsbury Town (R)	46	9	14	23	62	92	−30	41	Relegation to Football Conference

Rules for classification: In the Football League goals scored (GF) takes precedence over goal difference (GD).
(C) Champions; (O) Play-off winners; (P) Promoted; (R) Relegated
Notes:

Leading goalscorer: Andy Morrell (Wrexham), 34

=== Football Conference ===
- Champions:
  - Yeovil Town
- Also promoted to Third Division:
  - Doncaster Rovers (playoff winners)
- Relegated:
  - Nuneaton Borough (to Southern League)
  - Southport (to Northern Premier League)
  - Kettering Town (to Isthmian League)

=== National League System ===
	League	Champions
Step 2 Leagues	Northern Premier League	Accrington Stanley
Step 2 Leagues	Southern League	Tamworth
Step 2 Leagues	Isthmian League	Aldershot Town
Step 3 Leagues	Northern Premier League Division One	Alfreton Town
Step 3 Leagues	Southern League Midland/West Division	Merthyr Tydfil
Step 3 Leagues	Southern League South/East Division	Dorchester Town
Step 3 Leagues	Isthmian League Division One North	Northwood
Step 3 Leagues	Isthmian League Division One South	Carshalton Athletic
Step 4 Leagues	Northern League	Brandon United
Step 4 Leagues	Northern Counties East League	Bridlington Town
Step 4 Leagues	North West Counties League	Prescot Cables
Step 4 Leagues	Midland Alliance	Stourbridge
Step 4 Leagues	United Counties League	Holbeach United
Step 4 Leagues	Eastern Counties League	A.F.C. Sudbury
Step 4 Leagues	Hellenic League	North Leigh
Step 4 Leagues	Western League	Team Bath
Step 4 Leagues	Isthmian League Division Two	Cheshunt
Step 4 Leagues	Essex Senior League	Enfield Town
Step 4 Leagues	Spartan South Midlands League	Dunstable Town
Step 4 Leagues	Combined Counties League	Withdean 2000
Step 4 Leagues	Wessex League	Eastleigh
Step 4 Leagues	Sussex County League	Burgess Hill Town
Step 4 Leagues	Kent League	Cray Wanderers

== Women's football ==
=== Women's Premier League ===
==== National Division ====
Pos	Team	Pld	W	D	L	GF	GA	GD	Pts	Qualification or relegation
1	Fulham (C)	18	16	2	0	63	13	+50	49 (Note: Deducted 1 point for fielding ineligible player (Jess Wright) against Charlton Athletic on October 23, 2002.)	Qualification for the UEFA Cup qualifying round
2	Doncaster Belles	18	13	2	3	34	19	+15	41	
3	Arsenal	18	13	1	4	53	21	+32	40	
4	Charlton Athletic	18	10	4	4	44	20	+24	34	
5	Birmingham City	18	6	3	9	26	31	−5	21	
6	Tranmere Rovers	18	6	3	9	25	48	−23	21	
7	Leeds United	18	5	4	9	33	42	−9	19	
8	Everton	18	5	1	12	18	38	−20	16	
9	Southampton Saints (R)	18	2	5	11	10	30	−20	11	Relegation to the Southern Division
10	Brighton & Hove Albion (R)	18	1	1	16	18	62	−44	4	Relegation to the Southern Division

Source: FA WPL
(C) Champions; (R) Relegated

==== Northern Division ====
Pos	Team	Pld	W	D	L	GF	GA	GD	Pts	Promotion or relegation
1	Aston Villa (C, P)	22	16	4	2	59	18	+41	52	Promotion to the National Division
2	Sunderland	22	15	4	3	48	25	+23	49	
3	Oldham Curzon	22	14	2	6	48	29	+19	44	
4	Bangor City	22	11	4	7	46	37	+9	37	
5	Wolverhampton Wanderers	22	9	5	8	28	26	+2	32	
6	Liverpool	22	7	8	7	37	32	+5	29	
7	Lincoln City	22	6	7	9	38	46	−8	25	
8	Manchester City	22	5	6	11	31	37	−6	21	
9	Middlesbrough	22	6	2	14	25	44	−19	20	
10	Sheffield Wednesday	22	5	5	12	15	36	−21	20	
11	Ilkeston Town (R)	22	5	4	13	24	44	−20	19	Relegation to the Midland Combination League
12	Garswood Saints (R)	22	4	7	11	26	51	−25	19	Relegation to the Northern Combination League

Source: FA WPL
(C) Champions; (P) Promoted; (R) Relegated

==== Southern Division ====
Pos	Team	Pld	W	D	L	GF	GA	GD	Pts	Promotion or relegation
1	Bristol Rovers (C, P)	20	17	1	2	76	19	+57	52	Promotion to the National Division
2	Ipswich Town	20	11	2	7	49	36	+13	35	
3	Millwall Lionesses	20	10	4	6	41	33	+8	34	
4	Barnet	20	10	4	6	29	24	+5	34	
5	Bristol City	20	9	5	6	46	35	+11	32	
6	Chelsea	20	10	2	8	33	31	+2	32	
7	Merthyr Tydfil	20	9	3	8	30	34	−4	30	
8	Langford	20	8	5	7	38	35	+3	29	
9	Wimbledon	20	6	1	13	28	47	−19	19	Club dissolved at the end of the season, but reformed as AFC Wimbledon
10	Enfield Town	20	3	2	15	32	59	−27	11	
11	Barking (R)	20	2	1	17	22	71	−49	7	Relegation to the South East Combination League
12	Barry Town (X)	0	0	0	0	0	0	0	0	Folded before the new season began

Source: FA WPL
(C) Champions; (P) Promoted; (R) Relegated; (X) ?

=== FA Women's Cup ===
==== Final ====
5 May 2003
13:00 BST

Charlton Athletic	0–3	Fulham
	Report	Moore 18'; Hills 36' (o.g.); Williams 61' (o.g.)

Selhurst Park, London
Attendance: 10,389
Referee: George Cain (Liverpool)

== Transfer deals ==
=== Summer transfer window ===
The summer transfer window ran from the end of the previous season until 31 August.

2 May 2002

- Franck Queudrue from Lens to Middlesbrough, £2.5m

14 August 2002

- Juninho Paulista from Atlético Madrid to Middlesbrough, £6m

30 August 2002

- Tore André Flo from Rangers to Sunderland, £8m

31 August 2002

=== January transfer window ===
The mid-season transfer window ran from 1 to 31 January 2003.

31 January 2003

- Jonathan Woodgate from Leeds United to Newcastle United, £9m

For subsequent transfer deals see 2003–04 in English football.

== Famous debutants ==
- Wayne Rooney, 16-year-old striker, makes his debut for Everton in a 2–2 home draw with Tottenham Hotspur on 17 August 2002.
- James Milner, 16-year-old winger, makes his debut for Leeds United in a 4–3 away win over West Ham United on 10 November 2002.
- Milan Baroš, 20-year-old Czech striker, scores twice on his Liverpool debut as they beat Bolton Wanderers 3–2 at the Reebok Stadium on 14 September 2002.
- Leon Osman, 21-year-old midfielder, makes his debut for Everton in their 4–3 defeat at Tottenham Hotspur on 12 January 2003.

== Retirements ==
11 August 2002: Tony Adams, 35, retires after spending his entire 19-year career at Arsenal, and was team Captain for 14 seasons.

11 May 2003: Peter Schmeichel, 39, retires from playing after spending 10 of the last 12 seasons in England, the final of which was spent at Manchester City, though he is best remembered for his eight-year spell at Manchester United during which he established himself as a world class goalkeeper.

== Deaths ==
- 7 July 2002: Ray Wood, 71, Manchester United and England goalkeeper, who was a survivor of the Munich Air Disaster and won two league championship medals.
- 17 August 2002: John Charles, 57, played 118 league games at full-back for his only club West Ham United between 1962 and 1971 before his playing career was ended by injury. He died of cancer, which had been diagnosed in 2001.
- 5 November 2002: Rob Hindmarch, 41, former Sunderland, Wolverhampton Wanderers and Derby County centre-half, died of motor neurone disease.
- 30 November 2002: Alan Ashman, 74, former football manager who took Carlisle United into the old First Division in 1974 and West Bromwich Albion to F.A Cup glory in 1968.
- 18 December 2002:
  - – Bert Millichip, 88, chairman of The Football Association from 1981 until 1996 and a former director of West Bromwich Albion.
  - – Angus Morrison, 78, played 329 games in the English league after moving from his native Scotland in 1946, scoring a total of 95 goals from the left wing for Derby County, Preston North End and Millwall. Although he did not collect any silverware, he was on the losing side with Preston in the 1954 FA Cup Final.
- 19 December 2002: Arthur Rowley, 76, a former centre forward of Leicester City player and Football League record scorer who scored an English league career record of 434 goals.
- 31 December 2002: Billy Morris, 84, was an FA Cup runner-up with Burnley in 1947, and scored 47 league goals for the Turf Moor club. He was capped five times by Wales and had two short spells as Wrexham manager in the 1960s.
- 3 February 2003: Trevor Morris, 82, former Ipswich Town player who made one appearance for the club before his playing career was ended due to injury in a wartime match. Went on to manage Cardiff City and Swansea Town and was appointed secretary of the Football Association of Wales in 1971. Was also later awarded an OBE for his services to Welsh football.
- 5 February 2003: Dale Roberts, 46, assistant manager of Ipswich Town from 1995 to 2002, died of cancer. He played 24 league games at centre-half for the Suffolk club between 1974 and 1980 before signing for Hull City, spending six years at Boothferry Park and helping the club rise from the Fourth Division to the Second, narrowly missing out on a place in the First Division before he retired through injury in 1986 after 182 league games for the Tigers. He was in charge of Hull's youth team from 1989 to 1993 and was also assistant to George Burley at Ayr United and Colchester United before following him back to Portman Road, where he helped the club win promotion to the Premier League in 2000 and finish fifth a year later, although relegation back to Division One occurred after just two seasons.
- 29 May 2003: Trevor Ford, 79, played 401 games in English and Dutch leagues as a forward for Swansea, Aston Villa, Sunderland, Cardiff City, PSV Eindhoven and Newport County between 1946 and 1961, scoring 199 goals – peaking at Sunderland where he scored 67 goals in 108 games. He was also one of the leading goalscorers for the Welsh national side, scoring 23 times in 38 appearances, but was not included in the squad for the 1958 World Cup.
- 26 June 2003: Marc-Vivien Foé, 28, Cameroon midfielder who spent the 2002–03 season on loan to Manchester City from French side Lyon, collapsed and died during a FIFA Confederations Cup game. A post mortem revealed that Foé, who had played for West Ham United earlier in his career, had suffered from an undetected heart condition.

== Events ==
Chelsea are fined £5,000 for the state of the pitch at Stamford Bridge for their Premier League match against Charlton Athletic on 11 January. Chelsea were going to relay their pitch immediately after the match and had removed the old grass surface, leaving only the sand base on which the new pitch would be laid. Chelsea did not inform Charlton of the poor state of the pitch prior to the game, which Chelsea won 4–1.
