= List of Cork City F.C. players =

Cork City
- Full name: Cork City Football Club
- Nicknames: "City", "Rebel Army"
- Founded: 1984
- Ground: Turners Cross, Cork, County Cork
- Capacity: 7,485, all seated
Home colours	Away colours

Cork City F.C. (Irish: Cumann Peile Chathair Chorcaigh) is an Irish association football club who play in the League of Ireland. City were founded and elected to the league in 1984. Here is a list of all former players.

== A ==
- Tobi Adebayo-Rowling
- John Andrews
- Stuart Ashton

== B ==
- Paul Bannon
- Cian Bargary
- Aaron Barry
- Dave Barry
- Brian Barry-Murphy
- Steven Beattie
- Denis Behan
- Dougie Bell
- Alan Bennett
- Aaron Bolger
- Greg Bolger
- Liam Bossin
- Paul Bowdren
- Gary Boylan
- Trevor Brooking
- Tiernan Brooks
- Kenny Browne
- Willie Bruton
- Louis Britton
- Anthony Buckley
- Garry Buckley
- Alec Byrne
- Jody Byrne
- Ollie Byrne
- Willie Byrne

== C ==
- Achille Campion
- Mel Capleton
- Colm Carroll
- Ollie Cahill
- Matthew Carr
- Alan Carey
- Brian Carey
- Dan Casey
- Ryan Casey
- John Caulfield
- Karl Caulfield
- Peter Cherrie
- Kieran Coates
- Cian Coleman
- Anthony Connolly
- Dan Connor
- Mick Conroy
- Jimmy Corcoran
- Cormac Cotter
- Derek Coughlan
- Paul Coughlan
- Ronan Coughlan
- Kieran Crotty
- Conor Crowley
- Gareth Cronin
- Graham Cummins
- Kevin Custovic

== D ==
- Deshane Dalling
- Declan Daly
- Shane Daly-Butz
- Conor Davis
- Iarfhlaith Davoren
- Paul Deasy
- Billy Dennehy
- Darren Dennehy
- Damien Delaney
- Ryan Delaney
- Michael Devine
- Reyon Dillon
- Kieran Djilali
- Gerald Dobbs
- Jack Doherty
- Stephen Dooley
- James Doona
- Aidan Dowling
- Kevin Doyle
- Lawrie Dudfield
- Craig Duggan
- Shane Duggan
- Pat Duggan
- John Dunleavy

== E ==
- Tony Eeles
- Anthony Elding
- Connor Ellis
- Vincent Escude-Candau

== F ==
- Neale Fenn
- Kelvin Flanagan
- Charlie Fleming
- Stephen Folan
- Eoin Forde
- Danny Furlong
- Patsy Freyne

== G ==
- Joe Gamble
- Steve Gaughan
- Ross Gaynor
- Tommy Gaynor
- Matty Gillam
- Ally Gilchrist
- Fergal Giltenan
- Johnny Glynn
- Shane Guthrie
- Shane Griffin

== H ==
- Paul Hague
- Jonas Häkkinen
- David Harrington
- Phil Harrington
- Noel Hartigan
- Colin Healy
- Noel Healy
- Pat Healy
- Matt Healy
- George Heaven
- Robbie Hedderman
- Cathal Heffernan
- Willie Heffernan
- Stephen Henderson
- Ian Hennessy
- Mark Herrick
- Dave Hill
- Rob Hindmarch (Player Manager)
- Gavan Holohan
- Josh Honohan
- Colm Horgan
- Daryl Horgan
- Neal Horgan
- Joe Hurley
- Ronan Hurley
- Declan Hyde

== I ==
- Dominic Iorfa

== K ==
- Jason Kabia
- Jaze Kabia
- Danny Kane
- Uniss Kargbo
- Daryl Kavanagh
- Gavin Kavanagh
- John Kavanagh
- Jimmy Keohane
- John Kelleher
- Paul Kelleher
- Liam Kearney
- Sean Kelly
- Mike Kerley
- Tim Kiely
- Ciarán Kilduff
- Andriy Kravchuk
- Daniel Krezic
- Faz Kuduzovic

== L ==
- Ray Lally
- Rob Lehane
- Brian Lenihan
- Kevin Long
- Philip Long
- Shane Long
- Thomas Long
- Oswald Lopes
- Cillian Lordan
- Cathal Lordan
- Alex Ludzic

== M ==
- Sean Maguire
- Garan Manley
- Gerry McCabe
- Conor McCarthy
- Conor McCormack
- Terry McDermott
- Dylan McGlade
- Sean McLoughlin
- Barry McNamee
- Mark McNulty
- Leon McSweeney
- Micky Mellon
- David Meyler
- Liam Miller
- Dave Mooney
- Noel Mooney
- Dave Moore
- Pat Morley
- Cillian Morrison
- Danny Morrissey
- Gearoid Morrissey
- Rory Morrissey
- Dave Mulcahy
- Kevin Mulcahy
- Stephen Mulcahy
- Michael Mulconroy
- Jimmy Mulligan
- Cian Murphy
- Danny Murphy
- Darren Murphy
- Liam Murphy
- Kevin Murray
- Dan Murray
- Kieran Myers

== N ==
- Christian Nanetti
- Stephen Napier
- Kieran Nagle
- Ollie Nagle
- Liam Nash
- Jamie Nolan
- Michael Nwankwo
- Phil Neiland
- Philip Neiland Sr.
- Barry Neiland
- Tony Neiland

== O ==
- Colin P. O'Brien
- Colin T. O'Brien
- Derek O'Brien
- Liam O'Brien
- Trevor O'Brien
- Beneoin O'Brien-Whitmarsh
- Joe O'Brien-Whitmarsh
- George O'Callaghan
- Brian O'Callaghan
- Henry Ochieng
- Damian O'Connell
- Eoghan O'Connell
- Alan O'Connor
- Daire O'Connor
- Kevin O'Connor
- Rory O'Connor
- Shane O'Connor
- Stephen O'Donnell
- Fergus O'Donohgue
- John O’Donovan
- Roy O'Donovan
- John O'Flynn
- Stephen O'Flynn
- Chiedozie Ogbene
- Conor O'Grady
- Greg O'Halloran
- Josh O'Hanlon
- Don O'Keeffe
- Mark O'Mahony
- Joseph Olowu
- Tobi Oluwayemi
- Davin O'Neill
- Josh O'Shea
- Mark O'Sullivan
- Tunde Owolabi

== P ==
- Andy Packer
- Pierce Phillips
- Gary Philpott
- Tadhg Purcell
- Keigan Parker

== R ==
- Michael Rafter
- Darragh Rainsford
- Joe Redmond
- Declan Roche
- Dave Rogers
- Adam Rundle
- Darragh Ryan
- Tadhg Ryan

== S ==
- Kieran Sadlier
- Rimvydas Sadauskas
- Admir Softic
- Karl Sheppard
- Guntars Siligailis
- Alan Smith
- Dan Smith
- Kalen Spillane
- Matthew Srbely
- Kyron Stabana
- Rokas Stanulevicius
- Pat Sullivan
- Vinny Sullivan

== T ==
- James Tilley
- Ian Turner
- Tony Tynan

== U ==
- Chidoze Ukoh
- Jaden Umeh

== W ==
- Brad Wade
- Gordon Walker
- David Warren
- Robbie Williams
- Albin Winbo
- Nathan Wood
- Billy Woods
- Ben Worman
