= Colin Murphy (footballer, born 1944) =

English football manager (1944–2023)

Personal information
- Full name: Colin Victor Murphy
- Date of birth: 21 January 1944
- Place of birth: Croydon, England
- Date of death: 16 September 2023 (aged 79)

Senior career*
Years	Team	Apps	(Gls)
	Epsom & Ewell	41	(0)
- Gravesend and Northfleet
- Folkestone
- Hastings United

Managerial career
- 1976–1977: Derby County
- 1978–1985: Lincoln City
- 1985: Stockport County
- 1986–1987: Stockport County
- 1987–1990: Lincoln City
- 1992–1993: Southend United
- 1994–1995: Shelbourne
- 1995–1996: Notts County
- 1997–1998: Vietnam
- 2000: Cork City
- 2002–2007: Hull City (assistant)
- 2006: Hull City (caretaker)
- * Club domestic league appearances and goals

Colin Victor Murphy (21 January 1944 – 16 September 2023) was an English football player and manager who took charge of numerous clubs during a long management career, including Derby County, Lincoln City, Stockport County, Al Ittihad, Southend United, Shelbourne, Notts County, Cork City, and the Vietnam and Burma national teams.

== Playing career ==
Murphy had a brief career in semi-professional football for several non-league clubs in the 1960s and early 1970s starting at Croydon Amateurs and then moving to Epsom & Ewell in November 1962 where he remained for three seasons. Other clubs included Gravesend & Northfleet, Folkestone Town and Hastings United. However, he failed to break through into professional football.

== Coaching career ==
=== Early career ===
A qualified FA coach, Murphy was appointed reserve team coach at Nottingham Forest in November 1972 as part of newly appointed manager Dave Mackay's restructuring of his coaching staff. After Mackay departed the City Ground at the end of October 1973 to become manager of Derby County, Murphy initially remained in post helping prepare the first team. However, following the appointment of Allan Brown as the club's new manager, Murphy departed to rejoin Mackay at the Baseball Ground as reserve team coach. He was catapulted into the spotlight when Derby County surprisingly appointed him as their manager in November 1976. However, he lasted only ten months in the role before being sacked in September 1977, having led Derby to just seven wins in 35 games. He was replaced by Tommy Docherty. He was not out of work long as just two weeks later he was appointed assistant manager to Jimmy Sirrel at Notts County.

=== Lincoln City ===
Murphy left his role as assistant manager at Notts County to take charge of a struggling Lincoln City side that was beset by financial problems and had just completed a lacklustre campaign in the Fourth Division. In arguably his most successful period in management, Murphy secured Lincoln's promotion to the Third Division in the 1980–81 season with a second-place finish behind Southend United, thanks in large measure to Gordon Hobson's 21 goals. The following season was almost as successful, with the Imps knocking out First Division side Leicester City in the League Cup, eventually losing to Tottenham Hotspur, and leading the Third Division table for four months. A loss of form, possibly in part caused by a boardroom row over transfer budgets, resulted in a dramatic loss of form for Lincoln who ended the season in a disappointing sixth place.

The next two seasons were less impressive and Murphy eventually resigned in May 1985, after seven years at Sincil Bank. His departure came just ten days before Lincoln played Bradford City on the final day of the season in the game where 56 spectators died in the Valley Parade fire. The Murphy era is remembered fondly by the Imps faithful, with players such as Steve Thompson, Glenn Cockerill, Trevor Peake, Mick Harford, Tony Cunningham, Dave Felgate and John Fashanu contributing to one of the finest teams in Lincoln's history. However, his departure from the club was followed by back-to-back relegations, resulting in Lincoln becoming the first team to suffer automatic relegation from the Football League.

=== Stockport County and return to Lincoln City ===
Murphy quickly returned to management on 8 August 1985 as manager of Stockport County, but left the club on 24 October after a disappointing start to their Fourth Division campaign. He joined Al Ittihad in Saudi Arabia as part of the coaching staff under Bob Houghton, manager of Malmo in the 1979 European Cup Final. However, Murphy returned to Stockport in November 1986. Murphy masterminded the club's dramatic escape from relegation to the Conference at the expense of Lincoln City, who were relegated in the final minutes of the season.

Just a few weeks after the end of the 1986–87 season, Murphy resigned as Stockport manager and began a second spell at Lincoln City on 26 May 1987. Over the next three years he was able to guide Lincoln back into the Football League in his first season, and secure consecutive 10th placed finishes in the Fourth Division. Despite this renewed success, Murphy left the club by mutual consent on 20 May 1990 and spent the next two years coaching for Leicester City's youth team.

=== 1990s ===
Murphy returned to football as manager of Southend United on 8 May 1992, but resigned on 1 April 1993, taking the post as director of football and being replaced by Barry Fry. Notably, he signed Stan Collymore from Crystal Palace for £150,000, and sold him for £2.65 million to Nottingham Forest. His next post in management was at the League of Ireland side Shelbourne from December 1994 to May 1995. He took the club from the edge of the relegation zone to a final day finish that left Shelbourne just a few points short of the title. The club were also the beaten finalists in that year's FAI Cup.

Murphy then left to manage Notts County on 5 June 1995. Although the Magpies narrowly missed out on promotion to the second tier in his first season in charge after a 2–0 defeat to Bradford City in the playoff final at Wembley, the 1996–97 season was a disaster for Murphy and the club, with a series of heavy defeats that eventually led to his sacking on 23 December 1996.

In July 1997 he was appointed coach of the Vietnam national side, leading the team to a bronze medal at the 1997 Southeast Asian Games. In March 1998 he was appointed director of Tottenham Hotspur's youth academy. He resigned the post in July 1999 to take up the position of coach of the Burma national team with Peter Suddaby replacing him as academy director. When Dave Barry announced his intention to step down as manager of Cork City at the end of the 1999–2000 League of Ireland season, Murphy emerged as the favoured candidate to succeed him. He was duly appointed and led the club in their first game of the 2000–01 season, a Super Cup clash with Bohemians on 30 June 2000, but resigned a week later to become football co-ordinator at Premiership club Leicester City, working under their newly appointed manager Peter Taylor.

=== Hull City ===
Murphy joined Hull City in 2002, as assistant manager to Peter Taylor.

With the arrival of Phil Parkinson as manager, with Frank Barlow as his assistant, at the start of the 2006–07 season, Murphy took up the new role of director of development at the club – responsible for all scouting and youth development. He reverted to assistant manager, however, when Barlow left the club in October. After Parkinson also left the club, Murphy and first team coach Phil Brown were appointed joint caretaker managers. Brown was later appointed permanent manager, and Murphy reverted to his assistant role for the remainder of the season. With the appointment of Brian Horton, he resumed the role of director of development.

== Retirement and death ==
Murphy suffered a stroke in November 2007, and retired from his role at Hull City in January 2009. He died on 16 September 2023, at the age of 79.

== Honours ==
Lincoln City

- Football League Group Cup runner-up: 1982–83

== Sources ==
- Mears, Sally (2022). Murphy's Mission: Colin Murphy – Football Adventures from Sincil Bank to Saigon. Mersea Press. ISBN 978-1-7397104-0-8.
