= Tom Coughlan =

Tom Coughlan may refer to:

- Tom Coughlan (hurler)
- Tom Coughlan (football)
- Tom Coughlan (rugby union)
