= Cillian Morrison =

Irish Gaelic footballer

Personal information
- Born: December 1991 (age 34)

Sport
- Sport: Gaelic football
Club
- Years: Club
- 20??–: St Eunan's
Club titles
- Donegal titles: 1
Inter-county
- Years: County
- 20??–: Donegal
- Ulster titles: 1

Cillian Morrison (born December 1991) is an Irish Gaelic footballer who has played for St Eunan's and the Donegal county team. He has also played association football in the League of Ireland.

== Early life ==
Morrison is from Glebe in Letterkenny. His father is Seamus and his mother is Marjorie. He attended St Eunan's College. He went to University College Dublin (UCD) to study civil engineering after receiving a sports scholarship.

== Association football ==
Morrison played for Ballyraine as well as the Letterkenny and District schoolboys' team. He then played for Derry City under-age teams. He later scored a number of goals with UCD in the League of Ireland, having joined the team under their scholarship scheme. He later joined Cork City F.C. on an eighteen-month contract in 2014. It was his first professional contract. He roomed with brothers Billy and Darren Dennehy, as well as Iarfhlaith Davoren. He did not feature very much for Cork City. Before joining Cork, he asked Cork captain John Dunleavy and Cork manager John Caulfield, who had managed Morrison when he played for the Irish university football team the previous year, about what it was like. Morrison returned to northern soccer club Derry City in 2015.

== Gaelic football ==
Morrison made a second-half substitute appearance for Donegal in the quarter-final of the 2010 Ulster Under-21 Football Championship. He came on as a first half substitute for Antoin McFadden in the final of the 2010 All-Ireland Under-21 Football Championship. He won the penalty that Michael Murphy hit against the crossbar.

He started the final of the 2009 Donegal Senior Football Championship before Conor Gibbons replaced him late in the game.

After his club had won the 2014 Donegal Senior Football Championship, Morrison played in their 2014 Ulster Senior Club Football Championship campaign. Having dedicated his time to (association) football, he made his first start for his club in four years against Omagh in the semi-final, almost tying the game with a late goal. He had earlier appeared as a substitute in the quarter-final against Roslea Shamrocks.

Morrison featured again for his county in the 2016 Dr McKenna Cup under the management of Rory Gallagher.

Declan Bonner has shown interest in him in the past.

== Honours ==
Donegal

- All-Ireland Under-21 Football Championship runner-up: 2010
- Ulster Under-21 Football Championship: 2010

St Eunan's

- Donegal Senior Football Championship: 2009

UCD

- Collingwood Cup: 2013

== See also ==
- List of former Cork City F.C. players
