= Robert Hindmarch =

Robert Hindmarch may refer to:

- Bob Hindmarch (1930–2021), Canadian professor and ice hockey coach
- Rob Hindmarch (1961–2002), English footballer
