= Conor Gibbons =

Irish Gaelic footballer

Personal information
- Native name: Conchúr Ó Giobúin (Irish)
- Occupation: Primary school teacher

Sport
- Sport: Gaelic football
Club
- Years: Club
- 200?–?: St Eunan's
Club titles
- Donegal titles: 3
Inter-county
- Years: County
- 201?–?: Donegal

Conor Gibbons is an Irish Gaelic footballer who plays for St Eunan's and the Donegal county team.

== Playing career ==
Gibbons won three Donegal Senior Football Championships with his club: in 2009, 2012 and 2014.

He made a substitute appearance during the 2009 final, replacing Cillian Morrison. He started the final of the 2012 Donegal Senior Football Championship before being replaced in the second half.

Gibbons scored 0–2 in the final of the 2014 Donegal Senior Football Championship, including a crucial point that meant his team led at the break. The Irish Times described him as his team's "sharpest forward" in that game.

He scored a late point for Donegal to win a game in the 2013 Dr McKenna Cup, the team's first victory of the 2013 season.

Under the management of Rory Gallagher, Gibbons made a substitute appearance for his county against Kerry in the 2017 National Football League. He scored 0–1. He was named to start his first league game for his county in the following fixture against Roscommon. However, it was as a substitute that he ultimately appeared in that game.
