= Bert Millichip =

English footballer (1914–2002)

Sir Frederick Albert Millichip (5 August 1914 – 18 December 2002) was an English association footballer best known for his sometimes controversial contributions to the administration of the game.

== Biography ==
Raised in the West Midlands and educated at Solihull School in Solihull, Millichip played as a centre back for the third team of West Bromwich Albion in the years before World War II. During the war, he served in North Africa, Canada, Sicily and Italy, rising from an enlisted man to the rank of captain.

On demobilisation in 1945, he returned to his solicitor's practice and became a director of West Bromwich Albion. He took on the role of chairman in 1974, when the club was failing to make progress in the Second Division under manager Don Howe. Under Millichip's chairmanship, the club re-established itself in the First Division and recruited manager Ron Atkinson, building a team that was among the most exciting in English football circa 1980.

In 1981, Millichip was elected chairman of The Football Association and held the position during a period in which the English game suffered a succession of crises including the Heysel Stadium disaster, the Bradford City stadium fire and the Hillsborough disaster. His vacillation over the appointment of Terry Venables as manager of the national team, when the latter was under investigation and criticism for his business dealings, led journalist Brian Glanville to dub him Bert the inert.

He retired from the FA in 1996. In 1998, he was awarded a FIFA Order of Merit award.

== Personal life ==
On 24 February 1943 Millichip married Patricia Mary Long, the eighteen-year-old daughter of Arthur Long, a company director. The marriage was short-lived, and he later omitted it from his Who's Who entry.

On 27 December 1950 he married (Joan) Barbara Brown, a 24-year-old nursing sister. They had a son and a daughter. His son, Peter Millichip, who also followed his father into law, was also an ardent fan of West Bromwich Albion. He was a close friend of Sir Bobby Robson, and as Robson entered his final years, they worked together to establish the Sir Bobby Robson Football Academy, in Birmingham.

== Death ==
Bert Millichip died suddenly on 18 December 2002 at Selly Oak Hospital, Birmingham, following a heart attack which struck while he was attending an annual dinner at Edgbaston golf club. He was survived by his wife, Barbara, and their two children.
