= Tom Coughlan (football chairman) =

Tom Coughlan was chairman of Cork City from 2008 to 2010. Originally taking over the club following examinership in 2008, he was banned from the game in 2009 for twelve months. Due to accounting failures, the holding company of Cork City, Cork City Investments Fc Limited, was denied a League of Ireland Premier Division licence and later wound up.

== Background ==
In 1997, Coughlan ran for election to the Dáil as a candidate for the Progressive Democrats in Cork South-Central. He was not elected. He had previously been associated with Fianna Fáil and was election agent for Billy Kelleher's unsuccessful first run for the Dáil in 1992.

== Cork City FC ==
=== Takeover and management changes ===
In August 2008, Cork City went into examinership with debts of up to €1.3 million. The club had two potential buyers, but by the end of September, Coughlan was the preferred bidder. Cork City FC was taken out of examinership on 16 October 2008, with the club being taken over by Coughlan, and within two weeks the club were in the Setanta Sports Cup Final. They won this competition, and received prize money of €150,000. One of the first of many major decisions made by Coughlan at the club was to sack manager Alan Mathews on 9 December 2008. Mathews later stated he had been sacked by phone with Coughlan telling him "out of the blue" that he was no longer a part of the club. Mathews threatened legal action - but it was not pursued in the courts.

=== Winding-up order ===
In May 2009, the club were issued with a winding up order over unpaid taxes to the Revenue Commissioners. The club needed to raise €400,000 in a few weeks to keep the club from being wound-up. Despite raising some funds by selling some players, it was not enough, and the club was wound up on 27 July 2009. The club however successfully appealed the decision with the announcement of a friendly (and expected gate receipts) with Scottish club Celtic.

Around this time an issue arose before a game against St Pats in which the bus company would not take the team to the match - because the company had not been paid to do so. This resulted in what a player described as a "humiliating" plea from the team, as they sat stranded near the bus, on radio station Cork's 96FM for urgent donations from the general public to get them to the game on time.

=== Ban and closure ===
In response to his management practices, the FAI banned Coughlan from all football related activities for a year. On Thursday 17 December 2009, the FAI held a meeting, in which they were to accuse Coughlan of "bringing the game into disrepute". This meeting had been intended to take place on Monday 7 December 2009, but Coughlan was granted two adjournments. On the day of the rescheduled meeting, Coughlan and his solicitor left FAI headquarters, as they had been "left waiting an hour for proceedings to begin". Upon leaving, Coughlan was contacted by the FAI, who offered him to return or for the meeting to take place via video. Coughlan however refused, and as the maximum allowable adjournment had elapsed, the Independent Disciplinary Committee held the meeting in his absence. He was sanctioned with a one-year ban from football related activities, along with a €5,000 fine.

Coughlan later appealed this decision in the High Court, bypassing the FAI's appeal system. On Wednesday 26 January 2010, Coughlan lost this appeal, as the judge ruled that it was not a public matter. Justice John Hedigan referred to this as the "latest episode" in "the sad saga of Cork City's financial difficulties". Coughlan subsequently complied with the FAI ban, and stepped aside as chairman of the club.

Following his departure as chairman, the Cork City supporters group, backed by the investment firm Quintas, approached Coughlan for a takeover of the club. This takeover however ultimately failed - with responsibility for the failure (and ultimate winding up of the club) leveled at Coughlan by Quintas.

== See also ==
- League of Ireland in Cork city
