= Pat Morley (footballer) =

Irish footballer (born 1965)

Personal information
- Full name: Patrick Morley
- Date of birth: 18 May 1965 (age 61)
- Place of birth: Cork, Ireland
- Position: Forward

Senior career*
Years	Team	Apps	(Gls)
1984–1985	Waterford United	20	(10)
1985–1987	Limerick City	37	(19)
1987–1988	Waterford United	27	(9)
1989	Sunshine George Cross	8	(3)
1989–1996	Cork City	218	(90)
1996–1998	Shelbourne	34	(15)
1998–2002	Cork City	93	(39)

International career
1994–1997	League of Ireland XI	3	(3)
- * Club domestic league appearances and goals

Pat Morley (born 18 May 1965) is an Irish former footballer who played as a forward for Cork City, Shelbourne, Limerick and Waterford United. He also works for Irish broadcaster Raidió Teilifís Éireann as a commentator and analyst on Monday Night Soccer.

== Career ==
A former Celtic trialist Morley made his League of Ireland debut for Waterford United away to Finn Harps on 25 November 1984 scoring a hat trick in a 4–1 win. He scored in the final of the 1985 FAI League Cup for the Blues.

Morley also scored a hat-trick on his Limerick City debut in a Munster Senior Cup clash.

He scored four goals in European competition: 1993–94 European Cup clash with Cwmbran Town A.F.C., an infamous 1998–99 UEFA Cup game for Shelbourne against Rangers F.C., a 1999–2000 UEFA Cup winner against IFK Goteborg and an away goal against FK Liepājas Metalurgs in a 2001 UEFA Intertoto Cup tie after missing an injury time penalty in the first leg.

He is the third highest goalscorer in the history of the League of Ireland and was top scorer in the League of Ireland Premier Division in 1992–93 and 1999–2000.

As of 2008, he remained one of Cork City's all-time record goalscorers.

Morley represented the Republic of Ireland national team at youth level.

His father, Jackie Morley, played for Waterford United where he won four League of Ireland titles in the 1970s.

== Later life ==
In January 2009 Morley opened a menswear showroom in his native Cork.
