= Cork City F.C. =

Irish association football club

Cork City
- Full name: Cork City Football Club
- Nickname: The Rebel Army
- Short name: City
- Founded: 1984; 42 years ago
- Ground: Turners Cross
- Capacity: 7,485
- Owner: Dermot Usher
- Manager: Barry Robson
- League: League of Ireland Premier Division
- 2026: League of Ireland First Division, 1st of 10 (promoted)
- Website: www.corkcityfc.ie
Home colours	Away colours

Cork City Football Club is an Irish association football club based in Cork. The club was founded and elected to the League of Ireland in 1984.

Cork City was one of the first clubs in Ireland (and the first in Cork) to field a team of professional footballers. With the progression of professionalism at the club, continued development of the Turners Cross stadium and the transition to summer football, the club became one of the biggest and best supported clubs in the country. In a survey published in 2020, the club was the highest supported League of Ireland (LOI) club.

Cork City won its third LOI Premier Division title, and first FAI Cup double, during the 2017 season. After relegation to the First Division at the end of the 2025 season, the club secured promotion to the Premier Division in September 2026.

The club's traditional colours are green and white with red trim, and the crest is a variant of the Cork coat of arms. City's home games are played at Turners Cross.

== History ==
=== Pre-1980s ===
The current club are not the first to use the name Cork City. During the 1920s, teams referred to as Cork City competed in both the Munster Senior League and the Munster Senior Cup. A team named Cork City finished as Munster Senior Cup runners up in 1924–1925. Another Cork City F.C. also played in the League of Ireland between 1938 and 1940.

=== 1980s ===
Following the bankruptcy of Cork United in 1982, senior football returned to the city with the formation of a new Cork City FC in 1984. Founded by officials from several Cork clubs (including Cork United and Avondale United), the new club was elected to the League of Ireland. Bobby Tambling was the first manager appointed to the club, but he was replaced by Tony 'Tucker' Allen after only 13 games.

In its first and second seasons, the young club barely averted relegation to the new First Division – failing to win a single game at home in Flower Lodge and avoiding relegation only on goal difference. The club reached the semi-finals of the FAI Cup, but were knocked-out by Shamrock Rovers – in the last match played at the Lodge.

In 1986, the club moved to a new home at Turners Cross, where new manager Noel O'Mahony brought Cork to a midtable finish. The following year, former Ireland striker Eamon O'Keefe arrived as manager, delivering the Munster Senior Cup, and the League of Ireland Cup (the club's first national silverware).

By 1988, O'Mahony was re-installed as manager, and the side finished eighth in the league, and a loss to champions Derry City in the FAI Cup final earned the club its first European ticket. While Torpedo Moscow knocked the club out of the 1989–90 European Cup Winners' Cup, City earned a fifth-place finish in the Premier Division, and the Munster Senior Cup was reclaimed.

=== 1990s ===
The early 1990s saw lengthy unbeaten league runs, high league positions, retention of the Munster Senior Cup through four years, and a number of games in European competition. The most notable European game was a UEFA Cup tie with Bayern Munich, which saw City hold the Germans 1:1 at Musgrave Park before falling 0:2 to late goals in Bavaria. 1993 saw Cork City land the League of Ireland Premier Division title for the first time, after a complicated three team play-off. O'Mahoney resigned and the club moved to a new stadium in Bishopstown at the end of the season.

Damien Richardson took the helm and the 1993/94 season began with City coming from three goals down to beat Welsh side Cwmbran Town in the UEFA Champions League. In the following round, they suffered odd-goal defeats both home and away to Turkish side Galatasaray. City finished in runners-up position in the league that year.

1994/95 was a varied season for Cork City. After a strong start to the season, financial pressures forced Richardson to resign and with Bishopstown not being developed to plan, games were switched to Cobh, Turners Cross, and an enforced trip to Tolka Park. Noel O'Mahony was re-appointed as manager but the title challenge collapsed. The club did have successes in the Munster Senior Cup and League of Ireland Cup that season however.

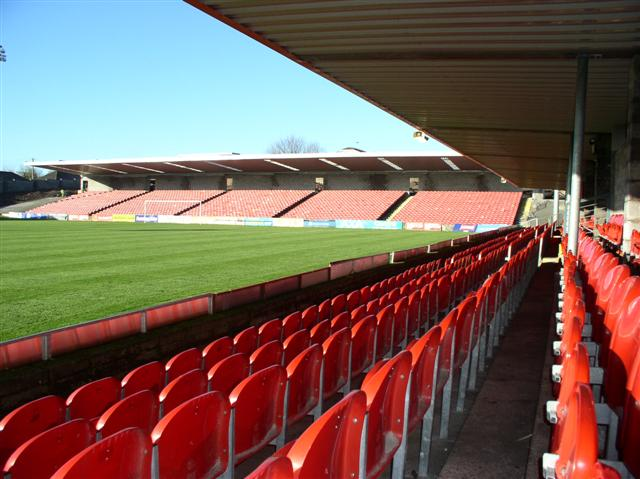
Cork City returned to Turners Cross in 1996

At the start of the 1995/96 season Rob Hindmarch took the reins, but the club was in trouble. With the stadium dragging it under, the receiver was called in and the club left 'homeless'. Efforts to save the situation saw a new board installed and a move back to Turners Cross. With limited funds, Hindmarch had skimmed along but relegation still threatened, and an FAI Cup exit saw Dave Barry appointed. The team managed a ninth-place finish in the league, and for the first time in five years City lost the Munster Cup – to Waterford junior side Waterford Crystal.

1996/97 saw City finish in fourth place. The club also narrowly lost out in the League Cup with an unexpected loss to First Division Galway United. Crowds began to increase, and the Munster Senior Cup was recaptured. The following season, Cork performed well in the InterToto Cup and the team improved to third in the league. Dave Barry's reign reached its high point in that year, when City won the 1998 FAI Cup. Cork began the following season with eight straight wins but in the end had to settle for second place, as three defeats to champions St Patrick's Athletic were costly. After finishing runner-up for the second season in a row in 1999/2000, Barry resigned to be replaced by Colin Murphy.

=== 2000s ===
Colin Murphy stayed for one FAI Super Cup game before departing to Leicester City just days before a UEFA Cup game. His replacement, Derek Mountfield, lasted less than a season and was replaced by former player Liam Murphy. Under Murphy, City embarked on a 13-game unbeaten run that brought an Intertoto ticket and a tenth Munster Cup success.

In 2001, a controversial link-up was proposed between City, English side Leicester City and local outfit Mayfield United. Fans protested however, and the link-up never materialised. Also in 2001, the board of directors stepped down and businessman Brian Lennox assumed control and lead the club to a professional era.

2002 was most notable as a time of transition, as several older players, who had been a mainstay of the team in the 1990s, left the club or joined the coach staff. They were replaced by younger signings – such as George O'Callaghan, John O'Flynn and Dan Murray.

In February 2003, ex-St. Pat's manager Pat Dolan was unveiled as the new boss and he led City to third place in the new summer season. Dolan's second season as manager also proved successful, as City surpassed Malmö FF and NEC Nijmegen in the Intertoto Cup and secured second place in the league.

Dolan was controversially sacked in pre-season 2005 and replaced by former manager Damien Richardson. In 2005, Richardson lead Cork City to their second league championship – winning on the final day of the season with a 2–0 victory over Derry City. In the same year, Cork City finished runners-up the FAI Cup.

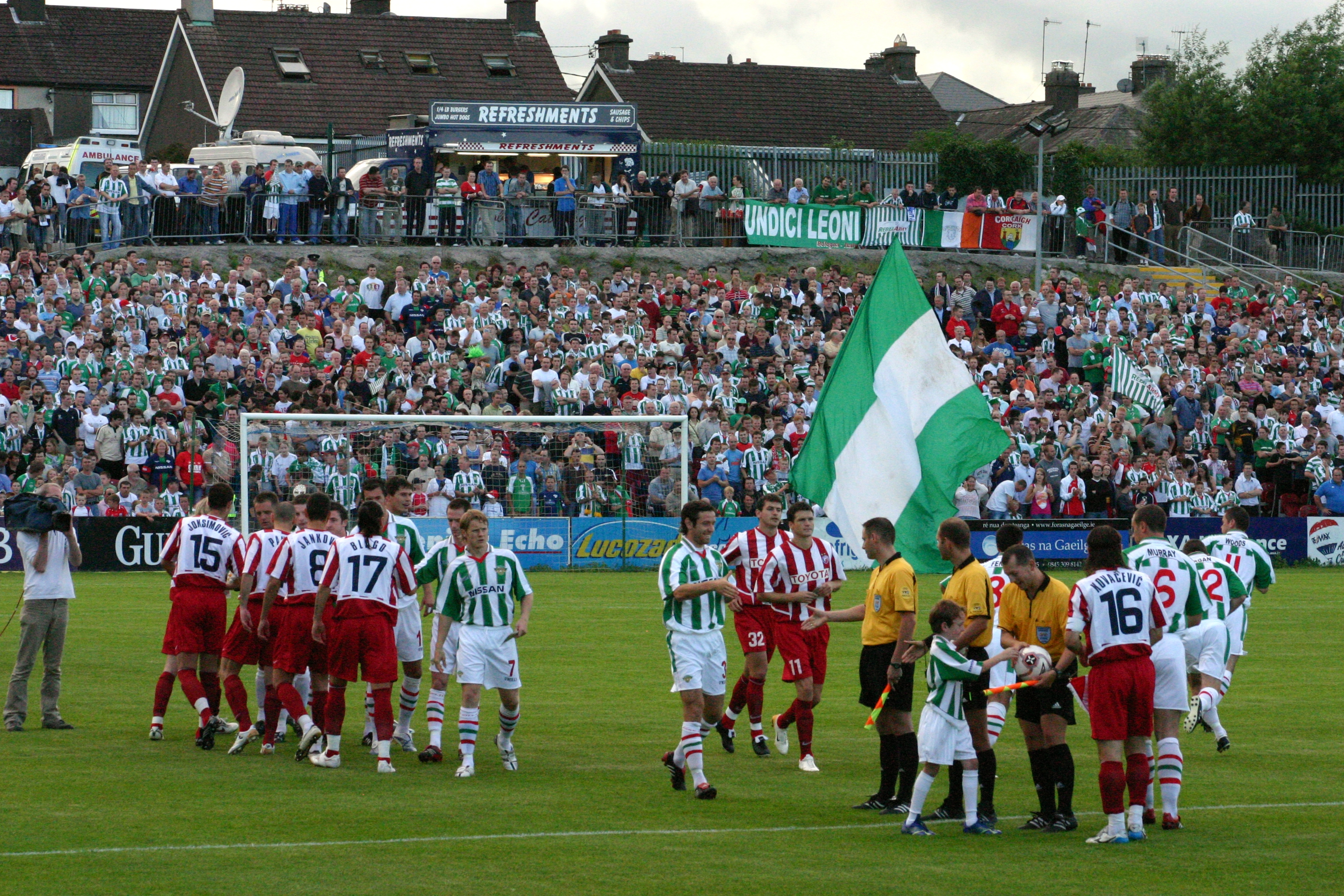
2006 UEFA Champions League qualifier- Cork City v Crvena Zvezda

2006 saw further upgrade work begin at Turners Cross and City met Apollon Limassol and Red Star Belgrade in the UEFA Champions League. The club lost to Drogheda United in the Setanta Cup Final, finished 4th in the league, and secured a place in the Intertoto and Setanta Cup.

At the start of the 2007 season, two new signings were deemed ineligible for play. This mirrored an inconsistent season start, with elimination from the Setanta Cup, a home win against St. Pat's and a record-equaling 4–1 defeat to Sligo Rovers. In August 2007, Roy O'Donovan left for Sunderland for a record LOI fee of €500,000. 2007 also saw the club's ownership change hands: from chairman Brian Lennox to venture capital firm "Arkaga". Despite an FAI Cup win, manager Damien Richardson's future at the club was in doubt, and – after some acrimony – he and the club parted ways.

In January 2008, former Longford Town boss Alan Mathews became manager, and the club signed several players – including taking advantage of FIFA's changes to the "3 club" rule by re-signing George O'Callaghan from Ipswich Town. However O'Callaghan was later dropped and released. City were knocked out of the first qualifying round in European competition by FC Haka. While David Mooney retained the league's top scorer spot, City failed to take points from Bohemians or St. Pats and finished fifth in the league. The club did however gain some silverware, beating Glentoran in the Setanta Sports Cup final. Off the pitch the club suffered a considerable threat when, in August 2008, after investment difficulties with venture capital firm Arkaga, the club entered into examinership. With debts of up to €800,000, cost-cutting measures were implemented. Under related rules, the club was docked 10 points in the league. In October 2008 the High Court ruled in favour of Tom Coughlan's bid to take over the club, and ended the examinership.

Paul Doolin replaced Mathews as manager for the 2009 season, and the side gained a number of positive results early in 2009 – including defeating Roy Keane's touring Ipswich Town 2–0. Despite these on pitch results however, the club's future was left in considerable doubt following a High Court decision on outstanding Revenue receipts. A "winding up" order was issued when no agreement could be reached on tax payments. The club were given several extensions to pay or to appeal, and the club narrowly staved off closure by meeting a final deadline. Doolin left at the end of 2009, after leading the club to a third-place finish in the 2009 League of Ireland Premier Division.

=== 2010s ===
Fallout from the financial and management difficulties in 2008 and 2009 followed the club into the new decade. Roddy Collins was appointed manager before the start of the 2010 season, despite questions over his contract status at Floriana F.C. Mounting pressure on owner Tom Coughlan (including threatened boycotts and censure by the FAI) resulted in his resignation as chairman. Club participation in the Premier Division was also left in doubt as licensing decisions were deferred pending changes in club ownership and payment of outstanding tax receipts.

Despite some temporary stays, and several months of court and legal wrangling, the club ultimately failed to gain a licence, meaning a deal on new ownership could not be secured, and the courts enforced a winding-up order on Cork City Investment FC Limited. Cork City fans entered the 2010 League of Ireland First Division with a new company under the name Cork City FORAS Co-op in the immediate aftermath of the winding up of the holding company CCIFC Ltd. The name of the club was restored on 1 June 2010 when a supporters' trust, FORAS, completed the purchase of the rights from Cork City Investments FC Ltd's liquidator. The team continued to compete in the League of Ireland as Cork City FORAS Co-op for the remainder of the season – though the club and most Irish media returned to calling the club Cork City FC, and supporters used this name during the entire period regardless.

Tommy Dunne (formerly assistant manager to Paul Doolin) was appointed first team manager, and oversaw the 2010 season. A number of players were called-up and played for the Ireland U23s, and others to the Ireland U21s. Shane Duggan, and Graham Cummins were both named in the PFAI First Division Team of the Year, while Cummins won the PFAI First Division Player of the Year award and was joint top-scorer in the First Division with 18 league goals. Cork ultimately finished sixth in the First Division in 2010.

In 2011, the club won the First Division, on the last day of the season, securing promotion to the Premier Division. The team also reached the league cup final, which was won by Derry City. The club were knocked-out of the 2012 FAI Cup by Shamrock Rovers in the third round, and finished sixth in the 2012 Premier Division league competition.

Results at the start of the 2013 season led to the removal of Tommy Dunne as manager by August, with Stuart Ashton overseeing the remainder of the season and a sixth-place finish. Former veteran player and record scorer John Caulfield was appointed manager in 2014, and oversaw unbeaten runs at the start and end of the season – keeping pressure on league-leaders Dundalk. However, despite pushing the title to a final day decider, Caulfield's side failed to pick up points from Dundalk and finished second in the 2014 Premier Division competition. The club were also runners-up in the 2015 season, again finishing second to Dundalk. This won them a place in the qualifying rounds of the UEFA Europa League, where they made it to the third round, their best European record since 1997. For the third consecutive year, Cork City finished second to Dundalk in the 2016 Premier Division. However, in November they beat Dundalk in the 2016 FAI Cup final after Sean Maguire scored a last minute extra time goal to win Caulfield his first major trophy as manager.

The 2017 season started with a 22-game unbeaten run, however a number of less favourable results mid-season (and the departure of league top-scorer Sean Maguire to the UK and international duty) pushed City's "inevitable" championship win until later in the season. Cork City were named 2017 League of Ireland Premier Division champions on 17 October 2017 - with several games in hand. The club completed its first league and cup 'double', by winning the 2017 FAI Cup Final a few weeks later on 5 November 2017.

City started 2018 with a third successive President's Cup final win over Dundalk - in a game overshadowed by the death of former player Liam Miller, who died earlier in February 2018. As with the preceding four seasons, Dundalk were Cork's main rivals in the 2018 League of Ireland Premier Division and 2018 FAI Cup, with Dundalk ultimately winning both.

A series of poor results at the start of the 2019 season, saw the departure of John Caulfield as manager. Neale Fenn was appointed as Caulfield's replacement in August 2019, following a period where Frank Kelleher and John Cotter held interim management and coaching positions. Cork City finished the 2019 season in 8th position, with just 9 wins and 37 points.

=== 2020s ===
With five games remaining in the 2020 season, and the club at the bottom of the table with just 2 wins, Neale Fenn was replaced as manager by Colin Healy. The club's relegation to the League of Ireland First Division was sealed on 24 October 2020, as their bottom of the table 10th-place finish was confirmed following a Finn Harps win over Bohemians.

In late October 2020, the supporters' trust agreed to sell the club to Preston North End owner Trevor Hemmings through his company Grovemoor Limited. However, in mid-December 2020, it was reported that the proposed sale would not progress, as Grovemoor Limited could not agree "terms on a lease agreement with the Munster Football Association" for the use of Turner's Cross. Hemmings, who had previously "rescue[d] Cork City" by increasing the payments offered for several player sell-on clauses, died in 2021. Relegated to the first division for the 2021 season, the club finished in sixth place, outside the premier division promotion places.

After winning the 2022 LOI First Division title in October 2022, with "two games to spare", the club secured promotion back to the premier division for the subsequent season. In late 2022, FORAS voted to transfer ownership of the club to businessman Dermot Usher, via a new company (Cathair Chorcaí 2022 FC Limited), subject to the execution of "deeds of surrender" on the call-option agreed with Grovemoor Limited in 2020. Liam Buckley was appointed as sporting director in early May 2023, and Colin Healy resigned as first team manager shortly afterwards. In September 2023, Richie Holland was named manager. In November 2023, after finishing ninth and losing to an extra-time penalty in the 2023 playoff decider, Cork City were again relegated to the LOI First Division for the 2024 season.

Tim Clancy replaced Richie Holland as coach towards the end of 2023, and was first team manager at the start of the 2024 season. A "youthful" and "experiment[al]" Cork City side were knocked out of the 2023-2024 Munster Senior Cup by Wilton United at the last-16 stage. The club started the 2024 League of Ireland First Division season with a 17-game unbeaten run. In August 2024, with the club "closing on an immediate return" to the Premier Division, Cork City re-signed former players Ruairí Keating (released from St Patrick's Athletic) and Sean Maguire (released from Carlisle United). With six games to spare and after a 12-game unbeaten run, Cork City secured the First Division title and automatic promotion after a win against UCD in early September 2024.

After a series of losses during the 2025 Premier Division season, and owing to an "accumulation of factors", Tim Clancy quit as Cork City manager following a 2-1 defeat to Derry City in May 2025. While Ger Nash, who replaced Clancy, lead the club to the 2025 FAI Cup final, Cork City were relegated to the First Division during October 2025, with three league games still to play. While the FAI Cup final in November provided what Nash called a "chance for a bit of redemption", defeat to Shamrock Rovers in the cup final concluded what was described in the Irish Examiner as a "miserable season". Nash resigned in December 2025, and was replaced by Barry Robson in January 2026.

Cork City started the 2026 season with an 11-game unbeaten run, before losing to Cobh Ramblers in their 12th game following a "contentious" penalty at Turners Cross. The club won its first Munster Senior Club title since 2019 in May 2026. With six games remaining in the 2026 season, Cork City won the First Division title (and promotion to the 2027 Premier Division) following a draw with Bray on 4 September 2026. It was the club's third such promotion in six years.

== Ownership ==
Until 2022, Cork City FC was owned by its supporters through a supporters' trust – the Friends of the Rebel Army Society (FORAS). FORAS came into existence during 2008, when financial issues resulted in a period of examinership, and the club's then holding company was wound up in 2010. FORAS entered a team into the 2010 League of Ireland First Division, before re-acquiring rights to the name "Cork City Football Club", and being promoted back to the premier division for the 2012 season. As of February 2022, the club remained within the ownership of the trust, however in December 2022, FORAS members approved the transfer of ownership to businessman Dermot Usher, former CEO of Sonas Bathrooms, with 86% support for the proposal.

After Usher took over, some fans expressed dissatisfaction at a perceived "disproportionate" increase in ticket prices at the start of the 2025 season. Usher held a fan forum, in mid-2025, where he reportedly reasserted his financial commitment to the club, but stated that a decrease in ticket prices "would not be financially sustainable for the club". A fan protest, focused on Usher's ownership, team performance and ticket prices, was held ahead of Cork City's win against St. Pats on 3 October 2025 in the 2025 FAI Cup semi-final.

== Stadium ==
Cork City play their home games at Turners Cross – a 7,365 all-seater stadium on the southside of Cork City. The stadium, officially known as the "Munster FA Turners Cross Stadium" since early 2026, is rented from the Munster FA as part of a long-term agreement.

== Honours and records ==
=== Honours ===
One of Cork City's crests

Title	Year/s
League of Ireland Premier Division (3)	1992–93, 2005, 2017
League of Ireland First Division (4)	2011, 2022, 2024, 2026
FAI Cup (4)	1998, 2007, 2016, 2017
League of Ireland Cup (3)	1987–88, 1994–95, 1998–99
President's Cup (3)	2016, 2017, 2018
Munster Senior Cup (20)	1987–88, 1989–90, 1990–91, 1991–92, 1992–93, 1993–94, 1996–97, 1997–98, 1998–99, 1999–2000, 2000–01, 2001–02, 2002–03, 2003–04, 2004–05, 2007–08, 2016–17, 2017–18, 2018–19, 2025–26
Setanta Sports Cup (1)	2008
A Championship Shield (1)	2008
Dr Tony O'Neill Cup (7)	2002–03, 2003, 2008–09, 2011–12, 2012–13, 2013–14, 2015
Enda McGuill Cup (5)	2004, 2006, 2011–12, 2012–13, 2016
FAI Youth Cup (4)	2000, 2006, 2009, 2011
Capital of Culture Cup (1)	2005
FAI Futsal Cup (1)	2009

=== Records ===
General
Record league victory	(a) v Athlone Town 7–0, 10 September 2011
Record league defeat	(a) v Shamrock Rovers 0–6, 21 February 2020
Longest unbeaten run	24, 1 April 1990 – 13 January 1991
Most Successive wins	12, 24 February 2017 – 5 May 2017
Appearances
Most appearances	John Caulfield – 455
Most starts	John Caulfield – 376
Most consecutive starts	Mark McNulty – 147
Most substitute appearances	John Caulfield – 79
League Goals
Aggregate	John Caulfield – 129, Pat Morley – 129
Season	Graham Cummins – 24 – 2011 (First Division), Pat Morley – 20 (Twice), Sean Maguire - 20 (Premier Division)
Game (including national cup competitions)	Ciarán Kilduff – 4 Vs. Shelbourne, 10 October 2013
Clean sheets	Phil Harrington – 112
European Goals
Aggregate	Sean Maguire – 5

=== Hall of Fame ===
Year	Inductee
2006 *	Dave Barry
2006	Patsy Freyne
2007	Declan Daly
2007	Phil Harrington
2008	John Caulfield
2008	Pat Morley
2009	Liam Murphy
2009	Colin T O'Brien
2010	Dave Hill Derek Coughlan
2011	Fergus O'Donoghue
2012	Philip Long
2015	Billy Woods
2017	Stephen Napier
2018	Patrick Shine
2019	George O'Callaghan
2019	John O'Flynn
* The "Cork City Official Supporters Club Hall of Fame" was inaugurated in 2006, with Dave Barry and Patsy Freyne as the inaugural inductees.

=== League placings ===
Chart of yearly table positions for Cork City in League of Ireland

Season	Points	Position	Season	Points	Position	Season	Points	Position	Season	Points	Position
1984–85	28	9th	1996–97	54	4th	2008	46^{C}	5th	2020	11	10th^{F}
1985–86	13	10th	1997–98	53	3rd	2009	60	3rd	2021^{D}	33	6th
1986–87	18	7th	1998–99	70	2nd	2010^{D}	52	6th	2022^{D}	68	1st
1987–88	34	7th	1999–2000	58	2nd	2011^{D}	69	1st	2023^{F}	31	9th
1988–89	26	8th	2000–01	56	3rd	2012^{E}	36	6th	2024^{D}	78	1st
1989–90	37	5th	2001–02	49	6th	2013	46	6th	2025^{F}	24	10th
1990–91	50	2nd	2002–03	39	4th	2014	72	2nd			
1991–92	43	3rd	2003^{A}	53	3rd	2015	67	2nd			
1992–93	48	1st	2004	65	2nd	2016	70	2nd			
1993–94	59	2nd	2005	74^{B}	1st	2017	76	1st			
1994–95	49	7th	2006	56	4th	2018	77	2nd			
1995–96	41	9th	2007	55	4th	2019	37	8th			
Change to "summer" season • Premier Division points record • Docked 10 points • First Division • Premier Division • Relegated

== European record ==
=== Overview ===
Competition	P	W	D	L	GF	GA
UEFA Champions League	10	2	1	7	7	16
UEFA Cup / Europa League	32	7	7	18	23	46
European Cup Winners' Cup / UEFA Cup Winners' Cup	4	1	0	3	2	9
UEFA Intertoto Cup	16	4	6	6	11	13
TOTAL	62	14	14	34	43	84

=== Matches ===
Season	Competition	Round	Opponent	Home	Away	Aggregate
1989–90	European Cup Winners' Cup	1R	(Russia) Torpedo Moscow	0–1	0–5	0–6
1991–92	UEFA Cup	1R	(Germany) Bayern Munich	1–1	0–2	1–3
1993–94	UEFA Champions League	PR	(Wales) Cwmbran Town	2–1	2–3	4–4 (a)
1993–94	UEFA Champions League	1R	(Turkey) Galatasaray	0–1	1–2	1–3
1994–95	UEFA Cup	PR	(Czech Republic) Slavia Prague	0–4	0–2	0–6
1997	UEFA Intertoto Cup	Group 4	(Belgium) Standard Liège	0–0	—N/a	4th
1997	UEFA Intertoto Cup	Group 4	(Israel) Maccabi Petah Tikva	—N/a	0–0	4th
1997	UEFA Intertoto Cup	Group 4	(Germany) Köln	0–2	—N/a	4th
1997	UEFA Intertoto Cup	Group 4	(Switzerland) Aarau	—N/a	0–0	4th
1998–99	UEFA Cup Winners' Cup	QR	(Ukraine) CSKA Kyiv	2–1	0–2	2–3
1999–00	UEFA Cup	QR	(Sweden) Göteborg	1–0	0–3	1–3
2000–01	UEFA Cup	QR	(Switzerland) Lausanne Sports	0–1	0–1	0–2
2001	UEFA Intertoto Cup	1R	(Latvia) Liepāja	0–1	1–2	1–3
2004	UEFA Intertoto Cup	1R	(Sweden) Malmö	3–1	1–0	4–1
2004	UEFA Intertoto Cup	2R	(Netherlands) Nijmegen	1–0	0–0	1–0
2004	UEFA Intertoto Cup	3R	(France) Nantes	1–1	1–3	2–4
2005–06	UEFA Cup	1QR	(Lithuania) Ekranas	0–1	2–0	2–1
2005–06	UEFA Cup	2QR	(Sweden) Djurgården	0–0	1–1	1–1 (a)
2005–06	UEFA Cup	1R	(Czech Republic) Slavia Prague	1–2	0–2	1–4
2006–07	UEFA Champions League	1QR	(Cyprus) Apollon Limassol	1–0	1–1	2–1
2006–07	UEFA Champions League	2QR	(Serbia) Red Star	0–1	0–3	0–4
2007	UEFA Intertoto Cup	1R	(Iceland) Valur	0–1	2–0	2–1
2007	UEFA Intertoto Cup	2R	(Sweden) Hammarby	1–1	0–1	1–2
2008–09	UEFA Cup	1QR	(Finland) Haka	2–2	0–4	2–6
2015–16	UEFA Europa League	1QR	(Iceland) KR	1–1	1–2 (a.e.t.)	2–3
2016–17	UEFA Europa League	1QR	(Northern Ireland) Linfield	1–1	1–0	2–1
2016–17	UEFA Europa League	2QR	(Sweden) Häcken	1–0	1–1	2–1
2016–17	UEFA Europa League	3QR	(Belgium) Genk	1–2	0–1	1–3
2017–18	UEFA Europa League	1QR	(Estonia) Levadia Tallinn	4–2	2–0	6–2
2017–18	UEFA Europa League	2QR	(Cyprus) AEK Larnaca	0–1	0–1	0–2
2018–19	UEFA Champions League	1QR	(Poland) Legia Warsaw	0–1	0–3	0–4
2018–19	UEFA Europa League	3QR	(Norway) Rosenborg	0–2	0–3	0–5
2019–20	UEFA Europa League	1QR	(Luxembourg) Progrès Niederkorn	0–2	2–1	2–3

== Players ==
=== First-team squad ===
As of 11 November 2026

Note: Flags indicate national team as defined under FIFA eligibility rules; some limited exceptions apply. Players may hold more than one non-FIFA nationality.

No.	Pos.	Nation	Player
1	GK	IRL	Conor Brann
3	DF	IRL	Matthew Kiernan
4	DF	IRL	Fiacre Kelleher
9	FW	IRL	Ruairí Keating
10	FW	NED	Hans Mpongo
15	DF	IRL	Conor Drinan
17	DF	IRL	Darragh Crowley
20	FW	IRL	Josh Fitzpatrick
23	DF	CAN	Chris N'sa

No.	Pos.	Nation	Player
24	FW	IRL	Sean Maguire
25	MF	IRL	Matthew Murray
28	DF	IRL	Rory Feely
31	DF	IRL	Ike Major-Georgewill
34	FW	IRL	Charlie Hanover
37	DF	IRL	Luke Downey
38	FW	IRL	Brody Lee
39	MF	IRL	Cillian Murphy
—	MF	IRL	Tom McGrath

=== Retired numbers ===
12 – Club supporters (the 12th man)

== Technical staff ==
As of February 2026, technical staff members supporting the first team included:

Position	Staff member
Head coach	Barry Robson
Assistant manager	David Meyler
Doctor	Gerard Murphy
Kit manager	Mick Ring
Head of academy	Colin O'Brien
Director of football	Liam Kearney

== Managers ==
Year/s	Manager
1984	(England) Bobby Tambling
1984–1985	(Republic of Ireland) Tony 'Tucker' Allen
1986	(Republic of Ireland) Noel O'Mahony
1987	(Republic of Ireland) Eamon O'Keefe
1988–1992	(Republic of Ireland) Noel O'Mahony
1992–1993	(Republic of Ireland) Damien Richardson
1993–1994	(Republic of Ireland) Noel O'Mahony
1994–1995	(England) Rob Hindmarch
1995–2000	(Republic of Ireland) Dave Barry
2000	(England) Colin Murphy
2000	(England) Derek Mountfield
2000–2003	(Republic of Ireland) Liam Murphy
2003–2004	(Republic of Ireland) Pat Dolan
2005–2007	(Republic of Ireland) Damien Richardson
2008	(Republic of Ireland) Alan Mathews
2009	(Republic of Ireland) Paul Doolin
2010	(Republic of Ireland) Roddy Collins
2010–2013	(Republic of Ireland) Tommy Dunne
2013	(England) Stuart Ashton (interim)
2014–2019	(Republic of Ireland) John Caulfield
2019–2020	(Republic of Ireland) Neale Fenn
2020–2023	(Republic of Ireland) Colin Healy
2023–2025	(Republic of Ireland) Tim Clancy
2025	(Republic of Ireland) Ger Nash
2026	(Scotland) Barry Robson

== Kit and colours ==
Original kit 1984–1989	Recurring black Away kit
Red Home kit 1997–2002	v. Nijmegen 2004
Per corkcitykits.com

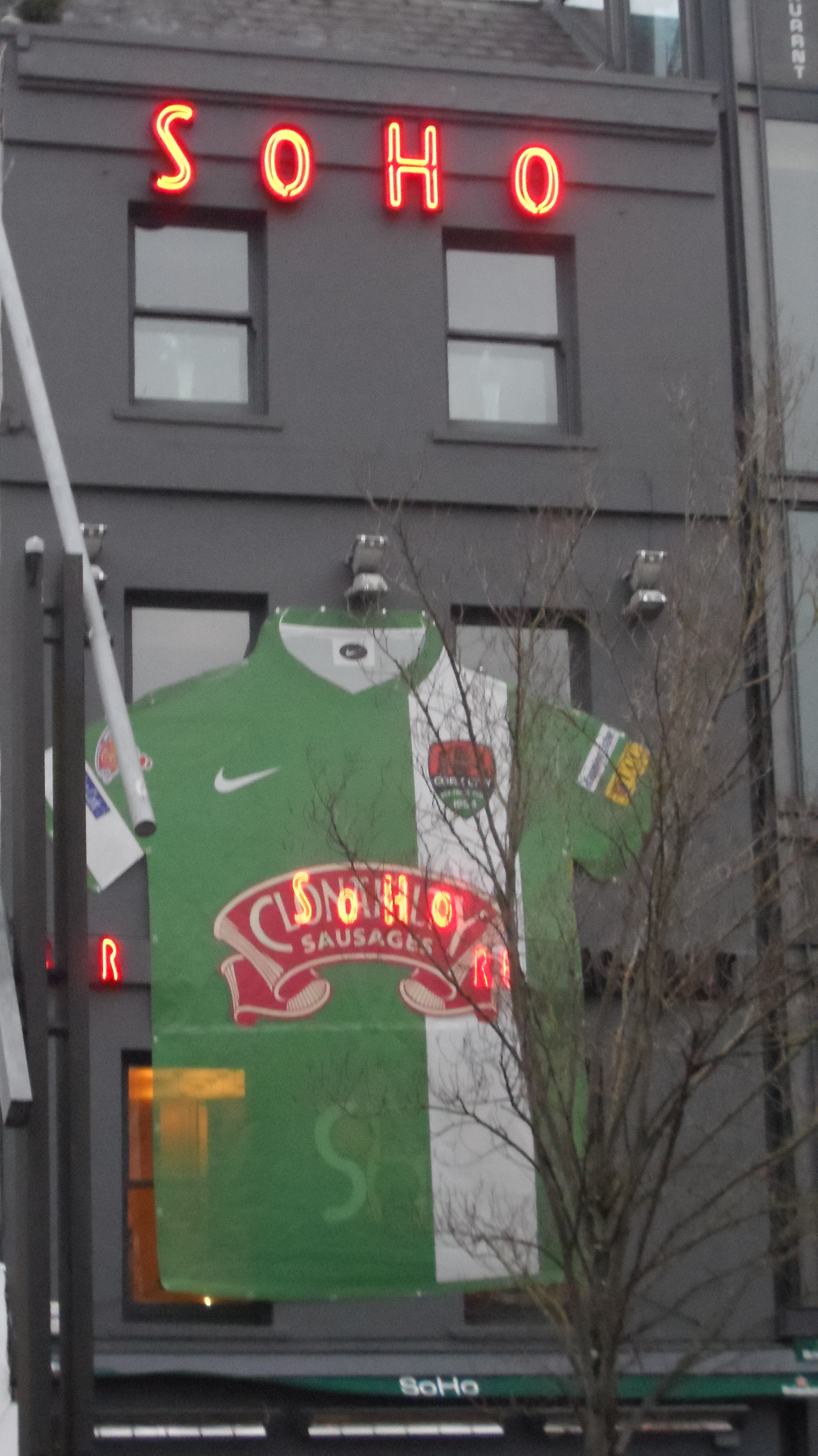
Graphic of a Cork City shirt decorating a bar on Grand Parade

The club's colours largely reflected the traditional colours of association football in Cork, with green and white featuring heavily. Since the club's inception in 1984, the kits also featured a red trim – influenced in part by the traditional Gaelic Athletic Association (GAA) colours of County Cork. Over the years, these base colours were worn in different combinations: originally green and white hoops in 1984, then white shirts with green and red trim in 1989.

In 1997, the club broke with tradition to use a red and white kit – similar to the Cork County GAA kits. Subsequently, the club reverted to the green and white theme in 2002, initially with white sidings rather than stripes, but eventually returning to green white and red stripes.

In 2004, when playing Intertoto cup opponents NEC Nijmegen, the referee deemed that both of Cork City's kits clashed with both of NEC's kits, and the club was forced to hurriedly source an alternative. The team ultimately wore borrowed all-white kits with a makeshift crest and sponsorship.

There was a recurring theme of black away kits – often with yellow trim – reflecting the kits of former Cork clubs. In 2004, a Cork XI selection featuring a number of City players faced Bolton Wanderers, wearing yellow and black. Black again became the colour of the team's away jersey in 2008, with a jersey from Danish maker Hummel.

In 2010, the club kept with tradition by wearing a green home kit with red and white trim manufactured by Hummel. The away kit for 2010 and 2011 was red with white trim, similar to Cork GAA kits. City wore red at home for the first time since the 2001/02 season on 10 September 2010 against Mervue United to show support for the Cork Gaelic footballers who were due to face Down in the All-Ireland Senior Football Championship Final the following weekend.

In November 2011, the club announced Umbro Ireland as the club's official kit partner. For the 2015, 2016 and 2017 seasons, the club's official kit partner was Nike, with gear provided by Teamwear Ireland. Starting from the 2018 season, the club's kit was supplied by Adidas. As of 2024, Adidas remained the kit provider.

== Supporters and rivalries ==
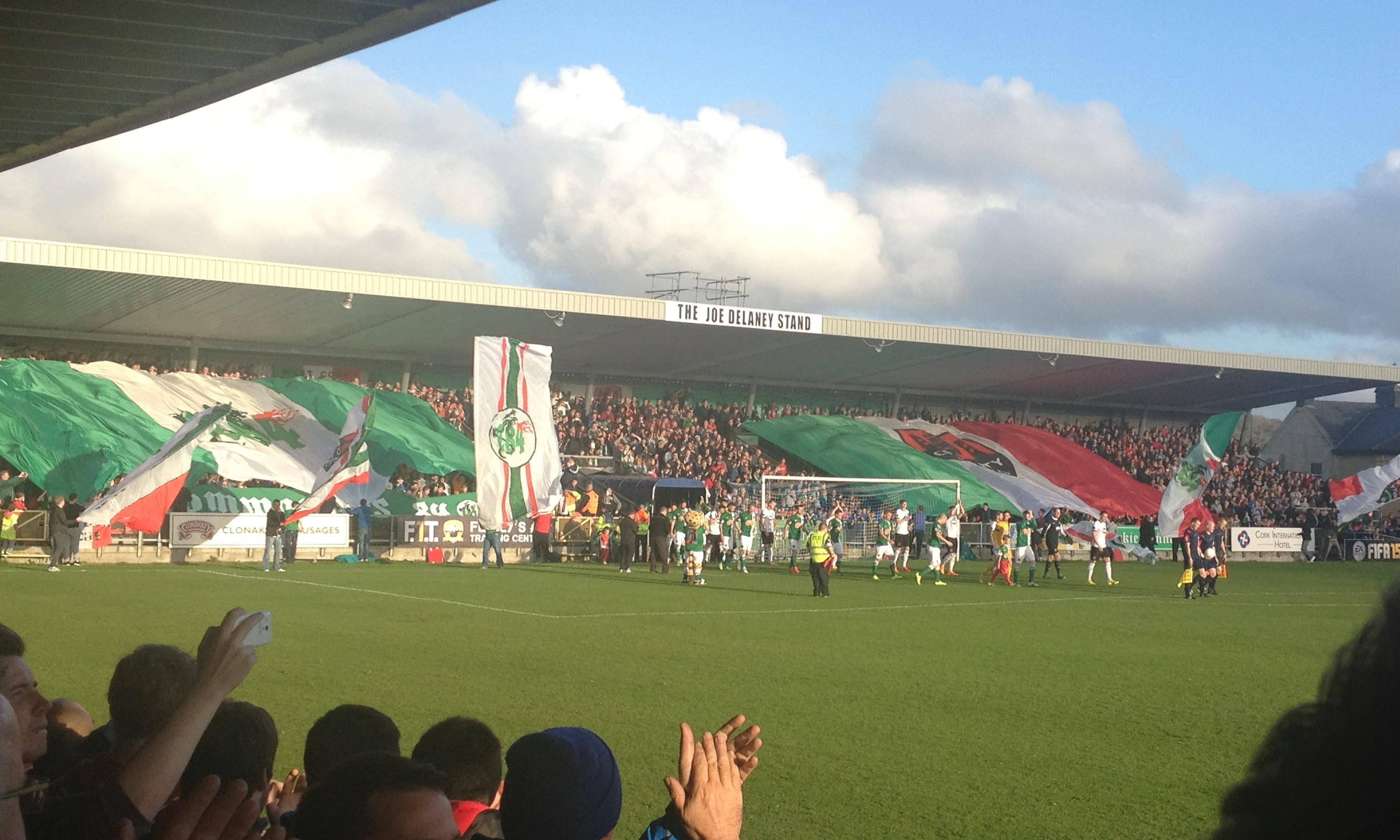
Colour from "shed-end" supporters ahead of a near-capacity game in April 2015

Cork City have one of the biggest support bases in the League of Ireland, and for example in early 2017 had average attendances of between four and five thousand per home game, compared to a league average of approximately 1,500. The club had an average attendance of 4,453 during the 2015 season, the highest in Ireland, and approximately 1,000 higher than the next highest averages. A 2020 survey indicated that Cork City had the highest number of supporters among League of Ireland clubs, and was the sixth highest supported football club in Ireland overall (between Chelsea and Barcelona).

"The Shed" is a section of seating in the Curragh Road stand which is home to Cork City's more vocal supporters and ultras group "Commandos 84". Before redevelopment, this was the location of the 'Shed End' terrace, which was knocked in 2005. The Family Enclosure is a specified area in the 'Donie Forde' stand, where families and children watch games in a less boisterous atmosphere than that of the Shed End. Commandos 84 were formed in 2004 with the aim of adding organised displays, noise and colour to the Shed with drums, flags, banners and pyrotechnics.

While there has never been any significant rivalry between the clubs, the only other league side in the Cork area is Cobh Ramblers F.C. Cork City has had some historical rivalry with Dundalk, as the two were Ireland's two biggest clubs between 2014 and 2017. As of 2017, games against Limerick F.C. were sometimes referred to as the 'Munster Derby'. Prior to 2010, this term was also sometimes applied to games against Waterford FC. Rivalry has also existed with some Dublin clubs, such as Shamrock Rovers. Following a game in May 2023, "disgusting" chants (which referred to his young son with leukemia) were directed from outside Cork City's ground at Shamrock Rovers' manager Stephen Bradley. The incident was condemned by local businesses and the club, and Bradley subsequently thanked the "genuine fans of Cork City" for their support. The club issued lifetime bans to those involved.

Former fanzines have included "FourFiveOne", "No More Plastic Pitches", "I was out there once!" (IWOTO), and "Going Commando".

== See also ==
- League of Ireland in Cork city
- List of Cork City F.C. players
