= Glossary of football terms =

Glossary of football terms may refer to:

- Glossary of American football
- Glossary of association football terms
- Glossary of Australian rules football
- Glossary of Canadian football
- Glossary of Gaelic games terms
- Glossary of rugby league terms
- Glossary of rugby union terms
