= Dave Barry (Irish footballer) =

Irish footballer

Personal information
- Native name: Daithí de Barra (Irish)
- Born: 16 September 1961 (age 65) Cork, Ireland
- Height: 1.78 m (5 ft 10 in)

Sport
- Sport: Gaelic football
- Position: Right half-forward
Club
- Years: Club
- 1978–1993: St Finbarr's
Club titles
- Cork titles: 4
- Munster titles: 4
- All-Ireland Titles: 2
Inter-county
Years	County	Apps (scores)
1980–1991	Cork	31 (6–54)
Inter-county titles
- Munster titles: 4
- All-Irelands: 2
- NFL: 1
- All Stars: 1

Dave Barry
Personal information
- Date of birth: 16 September 1961 (age 65)
- Place of birth: Cork, Ireland

Youth career
- Tramore Athletic

Senior career*
Years	Team	Apps	(Gls)
1984–1995	Cork City		

Managerial career
- 1995–2000: Cork City
- * Club domestic league appearances and goals

Dave Barry (born 16 September 1961) is an Irish former Gaelic football player and association football player.

== Career ==
=== Gaelic football ===
Barry played Gaelic football with his local club St Finbarr's and was a member at senior level of the Cork county team from 1980 until 1991.

=== Association football ===
Barry also played association football for Tramore Athletic, and played with (and managed) Cork City, making his League of Ireland debut in Cork's first ever League game on 16 September 1984. As a player, he won a league title, several national cups and played in numerous European ties for the club. When in charge, he won City's second FAI Cup and the side were also at the top end of the League of Ireland table under his stewardship. Perhaps his most famous moment is scoring the goal that put Cork City 1–0 up against giants Bayern Munich at Musgrave Park in the 1991–92 UEFA Cup. He also scored against Galatasaray at the Ali Sami Yen Stadium in the 1993–94 UEFA Champions League first round.

== Sources ==
- Brian Kennedy (2011). Just Follow the Floodlights. Liffey Press. ISBN 978-1-908308-03-0.
