= Rob Hindmarch =

English footballer (1961–2002)

Personal information
- Full name: Robert Hindmarch
- Date of birth: 27 April 1961
- Place of birth: Morpeth, Northumberland, England
- Date of death: 5 November 2002 (aged 41)
- Place of death: New Jersey, United States
- Height: 6 ft 1 in (1.85 m)
- Position: Central defender

Youth career
- Wallsend Boys Club

Senior career*
Years	Team	Apps	(Gls)
1977–1984	Sunderland	115	(2)
1983–1984	→ Portsmouth (loan)	2	(0)
1984–1990	Derby County	164	(9)
1990–1991	Wolverhampton Wanderers	40	(2)
- Telford United

International career
1978	England Youth	5	(1)

Managerial career
- 1995–1996: Cork City
- * Club domestic league appearances and goals

Robert Hindmarch (27 April 1961 – 5 November 2002) was an English footballer who played as a central defender. He once scored for Wolverhampton Wanderers against West Bromwich Albion in a Black Country derby, making him a folklore legend for the Wolves.

== Career ==
Hindmarch made his debut for Sunderland on 14 January 1978 against Leyton Orient in a 2–2 draw at Brisbane Road. In total, he made 115 league appearances – the vast majority in the First Division – scoring two goals for the club.

The defender signed for Derby County in July 1984 where he spent six seasons at the club, making 164 appearances, scoring nine goals, and helping them to two successive promotions to reach the top flight. He joined Second Division Wolverhampton Wanderers in 1990 for £350,000 and was appointed club captain, but spent just a single season at Molineux. His time with the club was perhaps most known for a last minute equaliser he scored in the Black Country derby at West Bromwich Albion.

He dropped into the non-league with Telford United in May 1993, having gone two years without first team action at Wolves, and had a spell as player-manager of Irish club Cork City in the 1995–96 season. He later continued his coaching career by moving to New Jersey in the United States to work at a coaching school.

== Death ==
He died on 6 November 2002 after suffering from Motor neurone disease. He had two sons, Carl and Lee.
