= 1923–24 League of Ireland =

League of Ireland
- Season: 1923–24
- Dates: 8 September 1923 - 13 May 1924
- Champions: Bohemians (1st title)
- Matches played: 90
- Goals scored: 335 (3.72 per match)
- Top goalscorer: Dave Roberts (20 goals)
- Biggest home win: Jacobs 7-1 Midland Athletic; Athlone Town 6-0 Midland Athletic
- Biggest away win: Pioneers 1-7 Bohemians; Pioneers 1-7 Shelbourne; Midland Athletic 0-6 Shelbourne; Pioneers 0-6 Brooklyn
- Highest scoring: St. James's Gate 3-6 Shelbourne

The 1923–24 League of Ireland was the third season of top-tier football in the Republic of Ireland. It began on 8 September 1923 and ended on 13 May 1924.

Shamrock Rovers were the defending champions.

== Changes from 1922–23 ==
Three teams were not re-elected to the league: Dublin United, Olympia and Rathmines Athletic. Only one new team was elected: Brooklyn, reducing the League to ten teams.

Elected	Not Re-elected
Brooklyn	Dublin United; Olympia; Rathmines Athletic

== Season overview ==
Bohemians won their first title.

== Teams ==
Locations of the 1923–24 League of Ireland teams

Team	Home city	Home ground
Athlone Town	Athlone	Sports Ground
Bohemians	Dublin (Phibsborough)	Dalymount Park
Brooklyn	Dublin (Merchants Quay)	Chalgrove Terrace
Jacobs	Dublin (Crumlin)	Rutland Avenue
Midland Athletic	Dublin (Whitehall)	The Thatch
Pioneers	Dublin (Whitehall)	The Thatch
St. James's Gate	Dublin (Dolphin's Barn)	St. James's Park
Shamrock Rovers	Dublin (Milltown)	Milltown Park
Shelbourne	Dublin (Ringsend)	Shelbourne Park
Shelbourne United	Dublin (Milltown)	Milltown Park

== Standings ==
Pos	Team	Pld	W	D	L	GF	GA	GD	Pts
1	Bohemians (C)	18	16	0	2	56	20	+36	32
2	Shelbourne	18	13	2	3	55	21	+34	28
3	Jacobs	18	11	2	5	36	21	+15	24
4	Athlone Town	18	8	5	5	34	24	+10	21
5	St. James's Gate	18	9	2	7	38	27	+11	20
6	Shelbourne United	18	8	3	7	30	31	−1	19
7	Shamrock Rovers	18	7	3	8	35	32	+3	17
8	Brooklyn	18	4	2	12	23	37	−14	10
9	Pioneers	18	2	1	15	15	60	−45	5
10	Midland Athletic	18	2	0	16	13	62	−49	4

Rules for classification: 1) points; 2) goal difference; 3) number of goals scored.
(C) Champions

== Results ==
Home \ Away	ATH	BOH	BRK	JAC	MID	PIO	STG	SHA	SHE	SHU
Athlone Town	—	0–1	4–1	3–1	6–0	3–0	3–2	1–2	2–3	0–0
Bohemians	4–1	—	3–1	2–1	4–0	3–2	2–1	4–1	2–0	5–0
Brooklyn	0–2	0–2	—	1–1	1–0	0–2	0–1	1–3	1–3	1–3
Jacobs	1–2	1–2	3–0	—	7–1	1–0	2–1	2–1	2–1	1–0
Midland Athletic	0–2	2–4	0–3	1–6	—	1–0	0–3	2–4	0–6	2–6
Pioneers	1–1	1–7	0–6	1–2	1–4	—	2–6	2–1	1–7	1–3
St. James's Gate	4–0	1–3	2–0	1–1	2–0	5–0	—	2–0	3–6	1–1
Shamrock Rovers	3–3	2–0	1–1	1–2	3–0	5–1	2–3	—	2–2	0–2
Shelbourne	0–0	5–2	5–1	3–1	2–0	2–0	2–0	3–2	—	4–0
Shelbourne United	1–1	1–6	2–5	0–1	2–0	3–0	3–0	1–2	2–1	—

Legend: Blue = home team win; Yellow = draw; Red = away team win.

== Top goalscorers ==
Pos	Player	Club	Goals
1	Dave Roberts	Bohemians	20
2	Christy Robinson	Bohemians	12
2	Frank Rushe	Shelbourne	12

== See also ==
- 1923–24 FAI Cup
