= 1922–23 League of Ireland =

League of Ireland
- Season: 1922–23
- Dates: 16 September 1922 - March 1923
- Champions: Shamrock Rovers (1st title)
- Matches: 130
- Goals: 529 (4.07 per match)
- Top goalscorer: Bob Fullam (27 goals)
- Biggest home win: Shamrock Rovers 9-1 Midland Athletic; Bohemians 8-0 Olympia; Jacobs 8-0 Midland Athletic
- Biggest away win: Pioneers 0-9 Shelbourne
- Highest scoring: Shamrock Rovers 9-1 Midland Athletic

The 1922–23 League of Ireland was the second season of the League of Ireland. It started on 16 September 1922 and ended in March 1923.

St James's Gate were the defending champions.

== Changes from 1921–22 ==
After being founded as the Football League of Ireland, the league was renamed the Free State League at the end of the competition's first season.

=== Team changes ===
Despite finishing in sixth and eighth place the previous season, Frankfort and YMCA were not re-elected.

Six new teams were elected, extending the League to twelve teams: Athlone Town, Midland Athletic, Pioneers, Rathmines Athletic, Shelbourne United and Shamrock Rovers. Athlone Town became the first team from outside Dublin to compete in the League.

| Elected | Not Re-elected |
|---|---|
| Athlone Town; Midland Athletic; Pioneers; Rathmines Athletic; Shelbourne United; Shamrock Rovers | Frankfort; YMCA |

== Season overview ==
Two matches were not played:

- The match between Rathmines Athletic and Dublin United was awarded as a scoreless win to Dublin United, as Rathmines Athletic resigned from the League before the end of the season.
- The match between Olympia and Athlone Town was awarded as a scoreless draw.

Shamrock Rovers won their first title.

== Teams ==
Locations of the 1922-23 League of Ireland teams

| Team | Home city | Home ground |
|---|---|---|
| Athlone Town | Athlone | Sports Ground |
| Bohemians | Dublin (Phibsborough) | Dalymount Park |
| Dublin United | Dublin (Donnybrook) | Anglesea Road |
| Jacobs | Dublin (Crumlin) | Rutland Avenue |
| Midland Athletic | Dublin (Whitehall) | The Thatch |
| Olympia | Dublin (Inchicore) | Bellevue Lodge |
| Pioneers | Dublin (Clontarf) | Strand Hall |
| Rathmines Athletic | Dublin (Rathmines) | Rathmines Park |
| St. James's Gate | Dublin (Dolphin's Barn) | St. James's Park |
| Shamrock Rovers | Dublin (Milltown) | Milltown Ground |
| Shelbourne | Dublin (Ringsend) | Shelbourne Park |
| Shelbourne United | Dublin (Donnybrook) | Anglesea Road |

== Table ==
| Pos | Team | Pld | W | D | L | GF | GA | GD | Pts |
|---|---|---|---|---|---|---|---|---|---|
| 1 | Shamrock Rovers (C) | 22 | 18 | 3 | 1 | 77 | 19 | +58 | 39 |
| 2 | Shelbourne | 22 | 15 | 4 | 3 | 72 | 14 | +58 | 34 |
| 3 | Bohemians | 22 | 14 | 4 | 4 | 72 | 23 | +49 | 32 |
| 4 | Shelbourne United | 22 | 12 | 3 | 7 | 43 | 37 | +6 | 27 |
| 5 | St. James's Gate | 22 | 11 | 3 | 8 | 49 | 35 | +14 | 25 |
| 6 | Athlone Town | 22 | 11 | 3 | 8 | 46 | 33 | +13 | 25 |
| 7 | Jacobs | 22 | 6 | 8 | 8 | 38 | 34 | +4 | 20 |
| 8 | Pioneers | 22 | 8 | 3 | 11 | 38 | 65 | −27 | 19 |
| 9 | Midland Athletic | 22 | 7 | 2 | 13 | 30 | 68 | −38 | 16 |
| 10 | Dublin United | 22 | 4 | 3 | 15 | 30 | 70 | −40 | 11 |
| 11 | Olympia | 22 | 2 | 7 | 13 | 13 | 57 | −44 | 11 |
| 12 | Rathmines Athletic | 22 | 2 | 1 | 19 | 21 | 74 | −53 | 5 |

Rules for classification: 1) points; 2) goal difference; 3) number of goals scored.
(C) Champions

== Results ==
| Home \ Away | ATH | BOH | DBU | JAC | MID | OLY | PIO | RAT | STG | SHA | SHE | SHU |
|---|---|---|---|---|---|---|---|---|---|---|---|---|
| Athlone Town | — | 2–1 | 6–1 | 2–1 | 2–1 | 4–0 | 5–0 | 4–2 | 1–3 | 0–1 | 0–0 | 3–3 |
| Bohemians | 2–0 | — | 7–1 | 1–1 | 4–0 | 8–0 | 7–0 | 4–1 | 2–2 | 0–2 | 1–4 | 1–0 |
| Dublin United | 0–4 | 0–6 | — | 2–2 | 2–2 | 3–3 | 2–3 | 6–1 | 1–0 | 1–7 | 0–6 | 4–2 |
| Jacobs | 1–2 | 1–4 | 2–1 | — | 8–0 | 0–0 | 2–2 | 5–2 | 2–0 | 2–4 | 1–1 | 1–2 |
| Midland Athletic | 0–4 | 2–6 | 3–2 | 1–0 | — | 2–1 | 2–3 | 5–3 | 1–4 | 1–3 | 0–3 | 1–0 |
| Olympia | – (Note: The match between Olympia and Athlone Town was awarded as a scoreless draw.) | 1–1 | 1–0 | 1–3 | 1–4 | — | 0–0 | 2–1 | 0–1 | 0–6 | 0–3 | 0–4 |
| Pioneers | 1–2 | 1–2 | 3–1 | 2–0 | 4–0 | 1–1 | — | 2–1 | 1–5 | 1–5 | 0–9 | 5–1 |
| Rathmines Athletic | 2–0 | 1–4 | – (Note: The match between Rathmines Athletic and Dublin United was awarded as a scoreless win to Dublin United, as Rathmines Athletic resigned from the League before the end of the season.) | 0–0 | 1–2 | 1–0 | 0–4 | — | 1–7 | 1–5 | 0–6 | 1–2 |
| St. James's Gate | 4–1 | 1–5 | 4–1 | 3–1 | 4–1 | 1–1 | 5–2 | 2–0 | — | 1–1 | 0–2 | 1–2 |
| Shamrock Rovers | 4–2 | 2–0 | 3–1 | 2–2 | 9–1 | 6–0 | 4–1 | 3–1 | 2–1 | — | 0–0 | 0–1 |
| Shelbourne | 3–1 | 1–1 | 3–0 | 0–1 | 3–0 | 6–0 | 7–0 | 5–0 | 3–0 | 2–7 | — | 4–0 |
| Shelbourne United | 3–1 | 0–5 | 2–1 | 2–2 | 1–1 | 2–1 | 4–2 | 6–1 | 4–0 | 0–1 | 2–1 | — |

Legend: Blue = home team win; Yellow = draw; Red = away team win.

== Top goalscorers ==
| Pos | Player | Club | Goals |
|---|---|---|---|
| 1 | Bob Fullam | Shamrock Rovers | 27 |
| 2 | Ralph Ardiff | Shelbourne | 26 |
| 3 | Stephen Doyle | Shelbourne | 14 |
| 3 | Patrick Duncan | St James's Gate | 14 |
| 3 | Christy Robinson | Bohemians | 14 |

== See also ==
- 1922–23 FAI Cup
