= Midland Athletic F.C. =

Midland Athletic
- Full name: Midland Athletic Football Club
- Nickname(s): The Railway Men
- Founded: 1904
- Ground: The Thatch; Whitehall, Dublin
- League: League of Ireland; Leinster Senior League

Midland Athletic Football Club was an Irish association football club. During the 1920s they played in both the League of Ireland and the Leinster Senior League. Despite the name, the club was based in Dublin and not the Midlands. Like several fellow early League of Ireland clubs, such as St James's Gate, Jacobs, Fordsons and Dundalk, Midland had their origins as a factory or works team. They were originally the football team of the Midland Great Western Railway based in Broadstone, Dublin. The club celebrated its 50th anniversary of its founding by holding a golden jubilee dinner in Moran's Hotel, Dublin on 10 December 1955. The occasion was noted in a Dublin newspaper with a photograph of the team and officials who represented them in the 1909–10 season.

== History ==
=== Early years ===
Midland Athletic were founded in 1904 and among its founding members was a young Joe Wickham. Wickham played as a centre-half with Midland Athletic and started his career as a football administrator when he became the club secretary.

=== Leinster Senior League ===
In 1921–22 Midland Athletic were playing in the Leinster Senior League. Other teams in this league this season included Shamrock Rovers, Bohemians B, St James's Gate B, Bray Unknowns, Shelbourne United, Pioneers, Brooklyn, Merrion, Glasnevin, CYMS and Richmond.

=== League of Ireland ===
The 1922–23 season saw the League of Ireland expand from eight to twelve teams. After Frankfort and YMCA dropped out, Midland Athletic became one of six new teams to join the league. The others were Shamrock Rovers, Shelbourne United, Pioneers, Athlone Town and Rathmines Athletic. During their two seasons in the League of Ireland Midland played their home games at The Thatch in Whitehall, Dublin. Midland eventually finished in 9th place in 1922–23 and 10th and last place in 1923–24. Midland Athletic also played in both the 1922–23 and 1923–24 FAI Cups. On both occasions they were knocked out in the first round by the eventual winners, Alton United and Athlone Town respectively. At the end of the 1923–24 season Midland Athletic were not re-elected. They were replaced in the league by Bray Unknowns.

== League of Ireland Stats ==
Stat	Opponent	Score	Competition	Date
Record Win	Olympia; Pioneers; Athlone Town	4–1; 4–1; 3–0	League of Ireland; League of Ireland; League of Ireland Shield	2 December 1922; 30 December 1923; 22 March 1924
Record Defeat	Shamrock Rovers; Jacobs	1–9; 0–8	League of Ireland; League of Ireland	3 March 1923; 17 February 1923

== Notable former players ==
=== Ireland ===
The following Midland Athletic players represented Ireland and/or the Republic of Ireland at full international level.

- (Republic of Ireland) (Ireland) Tom Davis

=== FAI official ===
- (Republic of Ireland) Joe Wickham
