= 1924–25 League of Ireland =

League of Ireland
- Season: 1924–25
- Dates: 6 September 1924 - 25 April 1925
- Champions: Shamrock Rovers (2nd title)
- Matches played: 88
- Goals scored: 344 (3.91 per match)
- Top goalscorer: Billy Farrell (25 goals)
- Biggest home win: Shelbourne 8-0 Brooklyn
- Biggest away win: Pioneers 1-7 Shamrock Rovers; St. James's Gate 1-7 Shelbourne
- Highest scoring: Shelbourne 8-0 Brooklyn; Pioneers 1-7 Shamrock Rovers; St. James's Gate 1-7 Shelbourne; Jacobs 6-2 Brooklyn; Brooklyn 2-6 Shamrock Rovers; Bray Unknowns 3-5 Pioneers; Pioneers 5-3 St. James's Gate

The 1924–25 League of Ireland was the fourth season of top-tier football in the Republic of Ireland. It began on 6 September 1924 and ended on 25 April 1925.

Bohemians were the defending champions.

== Changes from 1923–24 ==
Two teams withdrew from the League: Midland Athletic were not re-elected while Shelbourne United withdrew on 7 September 1924, the day after the season began.

Two teams were elected: Bray Unknowns and Fordsons, from Cork the latter being the first team from Munster to compete in the League.

Elected	Not Re-elected
Bray Unknowns; Fordsons	Midland Athletic; Shelbourne United

== Season overview ==
Both matches involving Athlone Town and Bohemians were not played, with both matches awarded as wins to Bohemians.

Shamrock Rovers won their second title.

== Teams ==
Locations of the 1924–25 League of Ireland teams

Team	Home city	Home ground
Athlone Town	Athlone	Sports Ground
Bohemians	Dublin (Phibsborough)	Dalymount Park
Bray Unknowns	Bray	Woodbrook Ground
Brooklyn	Dublin (Merchants Quay)	Chalgrove Terrace
Fordsons	Cork	Ballinlough Road
Jacobs	Dublin (Crumlin)	Rutland Avenue
Pioneers	Dublin (Whitehall)	The Thatch
St. James's Gate	Dublin (Crumlin)	St. James's Park
Shamrock Rovers	Dublin (Milltown)	Milltown Park
Shelbourne	Dublin (Ringsend)	Shelbourne Park

== Table ==
Pos	Team	Pld	W	D	L	GF	GA	GD	Pts
1	Shamrock Rovers (C)	18	13	5	0	67	12	+55	31
2	Bohemians	18	11	6	1	40	11	+29	28
3	Shelbourne	18	12	3	3	55	20	+35	27
4	Fordsons	18	10	1	7	35	32	+3	21
5	Jacobs	18	8	1	9	36	35	+1	17
6	St. James's Gate	18	5	7	6	30	36	−6	17
7	Athlone Town	18	5	4	9	15	32	−17	14
8	Brooklyn	18	4	3	11	24	57	−33	11
9	Bray Unknowns	18	3	3	12	21	44	−23	9
10	Pioneers	18	2	1	15	21	65	−44	5

Rules for classification: 1) points; 2) goal difference; 3) number of goals scored.
(C) Champions

== Results ==
Home \ Away	ATH	BOH	BRA	BRO	FOR	JAC	PIO	STJ	SHA	SHE
Athlone Town	—	– (Note: The match between Athlone Town and Bohemians was not played and awarded as a scoreless win to Bohemians.)	1–1	0–0	1–0	0–3	1–0	3–2	0–5	0–3
Bohemians	– (Note: The match between Bohemians and Athlone Town was not played and awarded as a scoreless win to Bohemians.)	—	1–1	5–1	4–0	5–0	0–0	3–3	1–1	2–2
Bray Unknowns	3–1	0–2	—	4–3	1–3	1–4	3–5	0–1	0–3	2–3
Brooklyn	0–1	0–4	1–0	—	0–3	3–1	3–0	2–2	2–6	0–2
Fordsons	2–1	0–3	3–1	3–3	—	3–0	3–1	4–1	0–6	2–0
Jacobs	1–1	1–2	3–2	6–2	2–0	—	4–1	2–0	1–4	1–3
Pioneers	1–3	0–6	1–2	1–2	1–5	1–6	—	5–3	1–7	1–6
St. James's Gate	1–1	0–1	0–0	5–1	3–2	2–0	1–0	—	2–2	1–7
Shamrock Rovers	6–0	1–1	6–0	6–1	3–0	3–0	5–1	0–0	—	1–1
Shelbourne	4–1	1–0	3–0	8–0	1–2	2–1	5–1	3–3	1–2	—

Legend: Blue = home team win; Yellow = draw; Red = away team win.

== Top goalscorers ==
Pos	Player	Club	Goals
1	Billy Farrell	Shamrock Rovers	25
2	Bob Fullam	Shamrock Rovers	20
3	Ned Brooks	Bohemians	12

== See also ==
- 1924–25 FAI Cup
