= 1921–22 League of Ireland =

League of Ireland
- Season: 1921–22
- Dates: 17 September – 17 December 1921
- Champions: St. James's Gate (1st title)
- Matches played: 56
- Goals scored: 204 (3.64 per match)
- Top goalscorer: Jack Kelly (11 goals)
- Biggest home win: Dublin United 6-0 Frankfort
- Biggest away win: YMCA 0-5 Bohemians
- Highest scoring: Frankfort 4-4 YMCA

The 1921–22 League of Ireland was the inaugural season of top-tier football in the Republic of Ireland. It began on 17 September and ended on 17 December 1921.

== Teams ==
Locations of the 1921-22 League of Ireland teams

Team	Location	Stadium
Bohemians	Dublin (Phibsborough)	Dalymount Park
Dublin United	Dublin (Donnybrook)	Beech Hill
Jacobs	Dublin (Crumlin)	Rutland Avenue
Frankfort	Dublin (Drumcondra)	Richmond Road
Olympia	Dublin (Inchicore)	Bellevue Lodge
St. James's Gate	Dublin (Crumlin)	St. James's Park
Shelbourne	Dublin (Ringsend)	Shelbourne Park
YMCA	Dublin (Sandymount)	Claremount Road

== Season overview ==
The first season of the League of Ireland featured eight teams in a single division, all of whom were based in Dublin. All eight teams had spent the previous season playing in the Leinster Senior League, while Bohemians and Shelbourne had also played in the 1919–20 Irish League.

The league was won by St James's Gate, who went on to complete a treble by winning both the FAI Cup and the Leinster Senior Cup, while Shelbourne won the League of Ireland Shield.

Frankfort and YMCA withdrew from the league at the end of the season, and together with Rathmines Athletic and Reds United they make up a group of four clubs who have played just one season in the top level of the League of Ireland.

== Standings ==
Pos	Team	Pld	W	D	L	GF	GA	GD	Pts
1	St. James's Gate (C)	14	11	1	2	31	8	+23	23
2	Bohemians	14	10	1	3	35	13	+22	21
3	Shelbourne	14	8	2	4	31	21	+10	18
4	Olympia	14	5	4	5	20	21	−1	14
5	Jacobs	14	4	4	6	23	27	−4	12
6	Frankfort	14	3	5	6	22	32	−10	11
7	Dublin United	14	5	0	9	25	39	−14	10
8	YMCA	14	0	3	11	17	43	−26	3

Rules for classification: 1) points; 2) goal difference; 3) number of goals scored.
(C) Champions

== Results ==
Home \ Away	BOH	DBU	FRA	JAC	OLY	STG	SHE	YMC
Bohemians	—	4–2	0–0	2–0	1–0	1–2	2–0	5–0
Dublin United	2–5	—	6–0	3–1	0–3	2–0	1–2	3–2
Frankfort	1–3	5–0	—	3–0	3–3	2–1	0–4	4–4
Jacobs	1–3	4–0	4–1	—	2–1	0–0	1–4	3–1
Olympia	1–3	2–0	1–1	2–2	—	0–4	1–1	2–1
St. James's Gate	1–0	5–1	2–0	4–2	0–1	—	4–1	2–0
Shelbourne	2–1	2–3	3–1	1–1	3–1	0–2	—	4–1
YMCA	1–5	2–4	1–1	2–2	0–2	0–2	2–4	—

Legend: Blue = home team win; Yellow = draw; Red = away team win.

== Top goalscorers ==
Pos	Player	Club	Goals
1	Jack Kelly	St James's Gate	11
2	Patrick Smith	Jacobs	10
3	Edward Pollock	Bohemians	9

== See also ==
- 1921–22 FAI Cup
