= Shelbourne United F.C. =

Shelbourne United
- Full name: Shelbourne United Football Club
- Nickname: Shels
- Ground: Beech Hill; Anglesea Road; Glenmalure Park
- League: Leinster Senior League; League of Ireland

Shelbourne United Football Club was an Irish association football club based in Dublin. They are often confused with the similarly named current League of Ireland team Shelbourne. Both teams had their origins in the same Ringsend suburb and both teams played in the Leinster Senior League and the League of Ireland during the 1920s. However they were completely different teams.

== History ==
=== Leinster Senior League ===
In 1920–21 Shelbourne United won the Leinster Senior League Senior Division title. After Bohemians, Shelbourne and St James's Gate, they became the fourth civilian team to win the league. Shelbourne United spent the 1921–22 season in the same league. Other teams in the Leinster Senior League Senior Division this season included Shamrock Rovers, Bohemians B, St James's Gate B, Bray Unknowns, Midland Athletic, Pioneers, Brooklyn, Merrion, Glasnevin, CYMS and Richmond. During this season Shelbourne United played some home games at Beech Hill, Donnybrook.

=== League of Ireland ===
The 1922–23 season saw the League of Ireland expand from eight to twelve teams. After Frankfort and YMCA dropped out, Shelbourne United became one of six new teams to join the league. The others were Shamrock Rovers, Midland Athletic, Pioneers, Athlone Town and Rathmines Athletic. Shelbourne United and Rathmines Athletic originally had their applications to join the league rejected at a meeting on 17 August 1922. They were only reconsidered after one of the original proposed expansion teams, University College Dublin, dropped out after concerns about their ability to field a team throughout the season. The League was also concerned about Shelbourne United's plans to play their home games at Anglesea Road, on a pitch already used by Dublin United. However, after observing a friendly between the two teams, the league finally accepted Shelbourne United following another meeting on Monday, 4 September 1922. Less than two weeks later, they made their League of Ireland debut on Saturday, 16 September 1922, in a 1–0 away win against Shamrock Rovers. The 1922–23 season eventually saw Shelbourne United finish fourth behind Rovers, Shelbourne and Bohemians. In the 1922–23 FAI Cup they defeated Bohemians 2–1 in the round of sixteen and in the quarter-finals they lost over two games to the eventual winners Alton United. In their second and final season, 1923–24, they played their home games at Milltown Ground and finished sixth. They were quarter-finalists again in the 1923–24 FAI Cup, this time losing 2–1 to St James's Gate. Shelbourne United withdrew from the League of Ireland on 7 September 1924, the day after the 1924–25 season had started. Their place in the league was awarded to Fordsons.

== Honours ==
- Leinster Senior League: 1
  - 1920–21
