= Tom Davis (footballer, born 1911) =

Irish footballer

Personal information
- Full name: Thomas Lawrence Davis
- Date of birth: 3 February 1911
- Place of birth: County Dublin, Ireland-
- Date of death: 9 September 1987 (aged 76)
- Height: 5 ft 10 in (1.78 m)
- Position: Centre forward

Senior career*
Years	Team	Apps	(Gls)
- Frankfort
- Beaumont
- Midland Athletic
- Shelbourne
- Cork
1931–1932	→ Exeter City (trial)	0	(0)
1932	Boston Town		
1932–1933	Torquay United	4	(1)
1933–1935	New Brighton	77	(50)
1935	Metz	1	(0)
1935–1937	Oldham Athletic	72	(51)
1937–1938	Tranmere Rovers	10	(6)
1938–1939	Cork City		
1939–1940	Dundalk		
- Workington
- Drumcondra
- Shelbourne
	Distillery	?	(24)

International career
1938	Ireland (IFA)	1	(1)
1936–1938	Ireland (FAI)	4	(4)

Managerial career
- 1947-1948: VVV Venlo
- * Club domestic league appearances and goals

Thomas Lawrence Davis (3 February 1911 – 9 September 1987) was an Irish association footballer who played as a centre forward for several clubs in the League of Ireland and the English Football League. Davis was also a dual international footballer—playing for both the Republic of Ireland (FAI) and Ireland (IFA), scoring a total of five goals in five caps. He was born in County Dublin.

== Club career ==
Davis spent his early career playing junior football with former League of Ireland clubs such as Frankfort and Midland Athletic before playing in the League of Ireland itself with Shelbourne and then Cork. His goalscoring form brought Davis a trial with Exeter City early in the 1931–32, but it was with Boston Town that he enjoyed his first settled spell in English football.

Davis arrived in the English League proper with Torquay United, but it was a move to New Brighton in the Third Division North that brought him to the attention of the wider world. Signed by French side FC Metz in 1935, he failed to settle, and broke his contract to return to England with Oldham Athletic. After serving a three-month ban for breaking his contract, he returned to his goalscoring ways. His tally of 35 goals during the 1936–37 season is still a record for an Oldham player. He scored four hat-tricks and scored seven goals in a seven-game run – five in the league and two in the FA Cup.

Midway through the 1937–38 season Davis signed for Tranmere Rovers and his return of six goals in ten matches helped push the club to the English Third Division North title, and promotion to the English Second Division for the first time in the club's history. At the outbreak of the Second World War, Davis returned to the League of Ireland, playing with Cork City, Drumcondra and Shelbourne. He did briefly return to England where he made a handful of appearances for Workington. He also had a spell with Distillery, where he netted 24 goals in a single season.

In 1947 Davis was appointed as manager of Dutch side VVV Venlo, and there was correspondence between Davis and The Irish Press suggesting a possible tour by the club to Ireland.

== Irish international ==
When Davis began his international career in 1936 there were, in effect, two Ireland teams, chosen by two rival associations. Both associations, the Northern Ireland – based IFA and the Irish Free State – based FAI claimed jurisdiction over the whole of Ireland and selected players from the whole island. As a result, several notable Irish players from this era, including Davis, played for both teams.

=== FAI XI ===
Between 1936 and 1938 Davis made 4 appearances and scored 4 goals for the FAI XI. He made his international debut on 17 October 1936 in a 5–2 win against Germany at Dalymount Park. He marked the occasion with two goals. Davis scored the FAI XI's second goal when he converted a penalty in the 40th minute. Then in the 75th minute when Paddy Moore shot from 25 yards and the German goalkeeper fumbled, Davis was on hand to get the fifth goal. Davis won his second FAI cap on 6 December 1936 and scored again in a 3–2 home defeat against Hungary. In May 1938 he was included in an FAI squad that briefly toured Central European. Davis led the attacking line in both matches. On 18 May he scored his fourth and final goal for the FAI XI in a 2–2 draw against Czechoslovakia. He made his final appearance for the FAI XI in a 6–0 defeat against Poland. This was the only international match in which Davis played that he failed to score.

=== IFA XI ===
On 18 November 1936, Davis made his one and only appearance for the IFA XI in a 3–1 defeat against England in the 1937 British Home Championship. Davis maintained his impressive international scoring record when he scored the only goal for the IFA XI.

== Honours ==
Tranmere Rovers

- Third Division North: 1937–38:

Cork City

- Munster Senior Cup: 1939
