= Pioneers F.C. (Dublin) =

Pioneers
- Full name: Pioneers Football Club
- Founded: 1908
- Ground: ALSAA Sports Complex; Dublin Airport
- Manager: Gary Deegan
- League: Leinster Senior League; Amateur Football League; League of Ireland
| Home colours | Away colours |

Pioneers Football Club is an Irish association football club based in Dublin. It was founded in 1908 by members of the Pioneer Total Abstinence Association. Between 1922–23 and 1925–26 they played four seasons in the League of Ireland. In 2009–10 Pioneers were playing in the Amateur Football League. In 2015 Pioneers were revived after a five-season period of inactivity. They recently played in the Leinster Senior League before disbanding in 2017.

== History ==
=== Leinster Senior League ===
In 1921–22 Pioneers were playing in the Leinster Senior League Senior Division. Other teams in this league this season included Shamrock Rovers, Bohemians B, St James's Gate B, Bray Unknowns, Shelbourne United, Midland Athletic, Brooklyn, Merrion, Glasnevin, CYMS and Richmond.

=== League of Ireland ===
The 1922–23 season saw the League of Ireland expand from eight to twelve teams. After Frankfort and YMCA dropped out, Pioneers became one of six new teams to join the league. The others were Shamrock Rovers, Shelbourne United, Rathmines Athletic, Athlone Town and Midland Athletic. Pioneers subsequently spent four seasons playing in the League of Ireland. They finished the 1922–23 season in 8th place, the 1923–24 season in 9th place and both the 1924–25 and 1925–26 seasons in 10th and last place. At the end of the 1925–26 season they failed to get re–elected and they were replaced by Dundalk. Pioneers also played in four FAI Cup campaigns. Their best result was a quarter final appearance in 1924–25.

=== Pioneer XI v Gallia ===
In 1923 Gallia Club Paris visited Dublin to play two friendly matches against Bohemians and Pioneers. The tour was significant as it saw the French Football Federation officially recognize the Football Association of Ireland. On Saturday, 31 March, Gallia played a 1–1 draw against Bohemians at Dalymount Park. Then on Sunday, 1 April, at same venue, a Pioneer XI played a 0–0 draw with Gallia. The FAI originally hoped that Gallia would play a League of Ireland XI. However the FFF had only sanctioned club matches. The Pioneer XI, however, was entirely made up of guest players and was effectively a League of Ireland XI. None of the players selected played for Pioneers. The guest players included, among others, Frank Collins, Ernie MacKay, Charlie Dowdall, Ned Brooks, Bob Fullam and Christy Robinson.

== League of Ireland Stats ==
| Stat | Opponent | Score | Date |
|---|---|---|---|
| Record Win | Midland Athletic; Rathmines Athletic | 4–0; 4–0 | 7 October 1922; 4 November 1922 |
| Record Defeat | Shelbourne | 0–9 | 16 December 1922 |

== Ground ==
During their four seasons in the League of Ireland, Pioneers played their home games at two different venues. During the 1922–23 season they played at Strand Hall, Clontarf. The following three seasons, 1923–24 to 1925–26 saw them play at The Thatch in Whitehall. During the 1923–24 season they shared this venue with Midland Athletic. While playing in the Amateur Football League Pioneers played at Saint Anne's Park. Since 2015 they have been based at the ALSSA Sports Complex, near Dublin Airport.

== Notable former players ==
=== Ireland internationals ===
The following Pioneer F.C. players represented Ireland at full international level.

- (Republic of Ireland) Paddy O'Reilly 1924
