= Fran Watters =

Irish footballer

Personal information
- Full name: Francis Watters
- Position: Centre forward

Senior career*
Years	Team	Apps	(Gls)
- Olympia
19xx–1926	Shelbourne		
1926–1927	Brideville		
- Drumcondra
1928–19xx	Shamrock Rovers		

International career
1926	Ireland	1	(0)
- * Club domestic league appearances and goals

Fran Watters was an Ireland international footballer. Watters played for several clubs in the League of Ireland and in 1925–26 scored 15 goals for Shelbourne, helping them win their first ever League of Ireland title.

== Playing career ==
=== Olympia ===
In 1917–18, together with Jack McCarthy, Watters was a member of the Olympia team that won both the Leinster Junior Cup and Leinster Senior Cup and reached the final of the IFA Junior Cup. In the Leinster Senior Cup final against Shelbourne, Watters scored the only goal in a 1–0 win.

=== League of Ireland ===
In the 1925–26 season while playing for Shelbourne, Watters formed a successful partnership with John Simpson. Between them Watters and Simpson scored 32 goals, helping Shelbourne win their first League of Ireland title. Watters 15 goals also saw him called up to the Ireland squad. The following season, he played for Brideville and helped them reach the 1926–27 FAI Cup final which they lost 1–0 after a replay to Drumcondra. In 1928–29 Watters joined Shamrock Rovers. On 28 October 1928 he scored a hat–trick for Rovers in an 11–0 win against Bray Unknowns. John Joe Flood also scored a hat–trick while Bob Fullam scored twice. This result remains Rovers all-time record win.

=== Ireland international ===
On 21 March 1926, while playing for Shelbourne, Watters made his one and only appearance for Ireland in an away friendly against Italy. Watters was originally included in the squad as a reserve. However, when Ned Brooks had to withdraw due to the death of his son, Watters found himself in the starting eleven.

== Honours ==
=== Olympia ===
- Leinster Senior Cup
  - Winners: 1917–18
- Leinster Junior Cup
  - Winners: 1917–18
- IFA Junior Cup
  - Runners Up: 1917–18

=== Shelbourne ===
- League of Ireland
  - Winners: 1925–26

=== Brideville ===
- FAI Cup
  - Runners Up: 1926–27
