= 1923–24 FAI Cup =

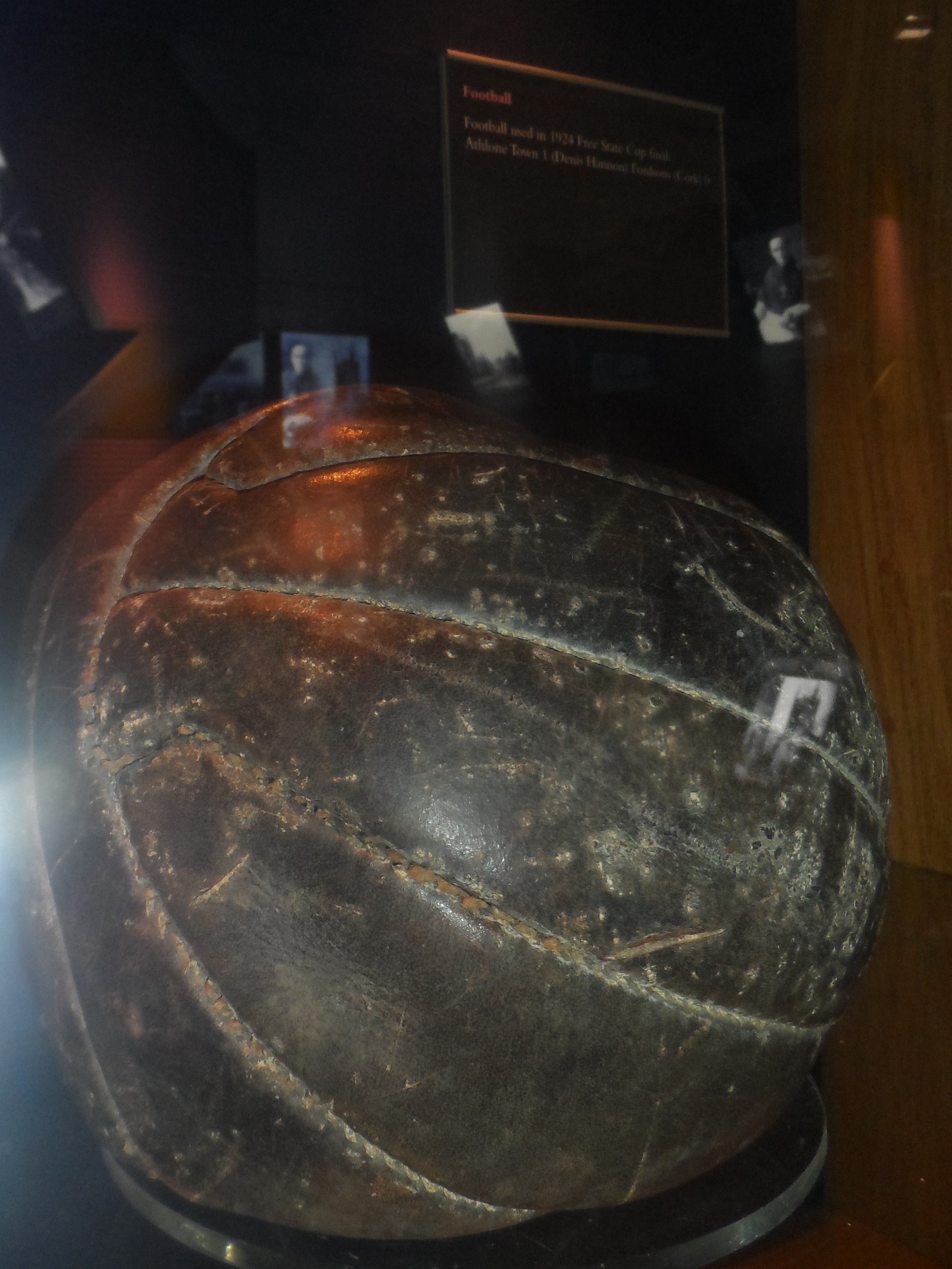
- Football used in the final; on display at the museum in Athlone Castle

Tournament details
- Country: Ireland
- Dates: 5 January 1924 – 17 March 1924
- Teams: 13

Final positions
- Champions: Athlone Town (1st title)
- Runners-up: Fordsons

Tournament statistics
- Matches played: 13
- Goals scored: 28 (2.15 per match)

The FAI Cup 1923–24^{[A]} was the third edition of Ireland's premier cup competition, The Football Association of Ireland Challenge Cup or FAI Cup. The tournament began on 5 January 1924 and concluded on 17 March with the final held at Dalymount Park, Dublin. An official attendance^{[B]} of 18,000 people watched Dinny Hannon secure Athlone Town's sole FAI Cup title by defeating Cork side Fordsons.

== First round ==
Tie no	Home team	Score	Away team	Date
1	Athlone Town	2-0	Midland Athletic	5 January 1924
2	Bohemians	1-0	Shamrock Rovers	5 January 1924
3	Brooklyn	1-2	Bray Unknowns	5 January 1924
4	St James's Gate	3-2	Pioneers	5 January 1924
5	Clifton	0-2	Shelbourne United	3 February 1924

Bye	Fordsons
Bye	Jacobs
Bye	Shelbourne

== Second round ==
Tie no	Home team	Score	Away team	Date
1	Bohemians	1-0	Bray Unknowns	19 January 1924
2	Shelbourne	0-2	Athlone Town	19 January 1924
3	Jacobs	0-2	Fordsons	27 January 1924
4	St James's Gate	2-1	Shelbourne United	17 February 1924

== Semi-finals ==
16 February, 1924

Bohemians	0–0	Athlone Town

Shelbourne Park, Dublin

2 March, 1924

Fordsons	4–0	St James's Gate
Collins; Pinkney

The Mardyke, Cork

=== Replay ===
1 March, 1924

Athlone Town	2–0	Bohemians
Ghent; Lyster

Shelbourne Park, Dublin

== Final ==
17 March, 1924

Athlone Town	1–0	Fordsons
Hannon

Dalymount Park, Dublin
Attendance: 18,000

Winner of FAI Cup 1923–24
Athlone Town
1st Title

== Notes ==
A. From 1923 to 1936, the FAI Cup was known as the Free State Cup.

B. Attendances were calculated using gate receipts which limited their accuracy as a large proportion of people, particularly children, attended football matches in Ireland throughout the 20th century for free by a number of means.
