= Dublin United F.C. =

Former Irish soccer club

Dublin United
- Full name: Dublin United Football Club
- Ground: Beech Hill; Anglesea Road
- League: Leinster Senior League; League of Ireland

Dublin United Football Club was an Irish association football club based in Donnybrook, Dublin. They played in the Leinster Senior League and the League of Ireland during the 1920s. In 1921–22 they played their home games at Beech Hill, while in 1922–23 they played their home games at Anglesea Road. In both seasons they shared their ground with Shelbourne United.

== History ==
In 1920–21 Dublin United were playing in the Leinster Senior League. They also won the Leinster Senior Cup, defeating St James's Gate 1–0 in the final. In 1921–22, together with Shelbourne, Bohemians, St James's Gate, Jacobs, Olympia, YMCA and Frankfort, Dublin United became founder members of the League of Ireland. Like Dublin United, the other seven founding members had spent the 1920–21 season playing in the Leinster Senior League. During the inaugural League of Ireland season, Dublin United defeated Frankfort 6–0 and thus achieved the league's biggest home win. They eventually finished the season in seventh place. In the 1921–22 FAI Cup Dublin United defeated Frankfort 8–1 in the first round. In the second round they lost 5–1 to the eventual winners Shamrock Rovers. In their second and last season in the League of Ireland, 1921–22, they finished in tenth place. In their final league game Dublin United were due to play Rathmines Athletic. However Rathmines resigned from the league without playing the match. The match was later awarded as a win for Dublin United. In the 1922–23 FAI Cup Dublin United took three games to beat Sligo Celtic in the round of sixteen. In the quarter-finals they lost 3–2 to Fordsons. Together with Olympia, Dublin United were not re-elected for the 1923–24 League of Ireland season.

== Honours ==
- Leinster Senior Cup: 1
  - 1920–21
