= Brooklyn F.C. (Ireland) =

Brooklyn
- Full name: Brooklyn Football Club
- Ground: Chalgrove Terrace
- League: League of Ireland; Leinster Senior League

Brooklyn Football Club was an Irish association football club, originally based in the Merchants Quay district of Dublin. Brooklyn were active in the 1920s and played in the Leinster Senior League, the League of Ireland and the FAI Cup. They took their name from Brooklyn Terrace and played their home games at nearby Chalgrove Terrace. Both locations no longer exist and have since been redeveloped.

== History ==
=== Leinster Senior League ===
In 1921–22 Brooklyn were playing in the Leinster Senior League. Other teams in this league this season included Shamrock Rovers, Bohemians B, St James's Gate B, Bray Unknowns, Shelbourne United, Pioneers, Midland Athletic, Merrion, Glasnevin, CYMS and Richmond.

=== League of Ireland ===
Brooklyn played in the League of Ireland for just two seasons – 1923–24 and 1924–25. On both occasions they finished 8th in a ten team league. They also competed in the 1923–24 and 1924–25 FAI Cups. At the end of their second season in the league, Brooklyn failed to get re-elected and were subsequently replaced by Brideville for the 1925–26 season.

== Notable former players ==
=== Ireland internationals ===
The following Brooklyn players represented Ireland at full international level. Joe Kendrick and Tony Hunston both represented Ireland while playing for Brooklyn.

- (Republic of Ireland) Jimmy Bermingham
- (Republic of Ireland) Tony Hunston
- (Republic of Ireland) Joe Kendrick
