= 1922–23 FAI Cup =

Tournament details
- Country: Ireland
- Dates: 6 January–17 March 1923
- Teams: 16

Final positions
- Champions: Alton United (1st title)
- Runners-up: Shelbourne

Tournament statistics
- Matches played: 19
- Goals scored: 63 (3.32 per match)

The FAI Cup 1922–23^{[A]} was the second edition of Ireland's premier cup competition, The Football Association of Ireland Challenge Cup or FAI Cup. The tournament began on 6 January 1923 and concluded on 17 March with the final held at Dalymount Park, Dublin. An official attendance^{[B]} of 14,000 people watched Belfast side Alton United of the Falls League defeat Shelbourne 1–0. The Falls League's affiliation to the FAI,^{[C]} rather than the IFA, allowed the club to compete in the cup.

== First round ==
Tie no	Home team	Score	Away team	Date
1	Alton United	4-0^{[D]}	Midland Athletic	6 January 1923
refix^{[D]}	Alton United	5-0	Midland Athletic	13 January 1923
2	Athlone Town	1-2	Shamrock Rovers	6 January 1923
3	Bohemians	1-2	Shelbourne United	6 January 1923
4	Fordsons	W.O.	Rathmines Athletic	6 January 1923
5	Jacobs	4-0	Pioneers	6 January 1923
6	Olympia	0-1	St James's Gate	6 January 1923
7	Shelbourne	9-0	Bray Unknowns	6 January 1923
8	Dublin United	3-3	Sligo Celtic	7 January 1923
replay	Sligo Celtic	0-0	Dublin United	14 January 1923
replay(2)	Dublin United	3-1	Sligo Celtic	28 January 1923

== Second round ==
Tie no	Home team	Score	Away team	Date
1	Shelbourne United	1-1	Alton United	20 January 1923
replay	Alton United	2-0	Shelbourne United	27 January 1923
2	St James's Gate	1-2	Shelbourne	20 January 1923
3	Shamrock Rovers	1-2	Jacobs	21 January 1923
4	Dublin United	2-3	Fordsons	4 February 1923

== Semi-finals ==
17 February, 1923

Alton United	4–2	Fordsons
Ward(3); Brennan(pen)		Buckle(2)

Dalymount Park, Dublin

3 March, 1923

Shelbourne	2–0	Jacobs
Harvey; Williams

Dalymount Park, Dublin

== Final ==
17 March, 1923

Alton United	1–0	Shelbourne
Ward

Dalymount Park, Dublin
Attendance: 14,000

Winner of FAI Cup 1922–23
Alton United
1st Title

== Notes ==
A. From 1923 to 1936, the FAI Cup was known as the Free State Cup.

B. Attendances were calculated using gate receipts which limited their accuracy as a large proportion of people, particularly children, attended football matches in Ireland throughout the 20th century for free by a number of means.

C. The FAI applied to join FIFA in 1923 and was admitted as the FAIFS (Football Association of the Irish Free State).

D. ^{a} Fixture abandoned during 2nd half due to bad light. Re-Fixture played on 13 January.
