= Joe Wickham =

Joe Wickham (1890 in Phibsboro, Dublin – 3 November 1968 in Katowice, Poland) was the General Secretary of the Football Association of Ireland from the 1930s until his death in 1968 at the age of 78. He took over from Jack Ryder in 1936, having previously worked as a supervisor in the coach-building workshop in the Broadstone depot of the Midland Great Western Railway. At the time, he had been the longest-serving secretary of any of the world's national soccer organisations.

== Life and career ==
Wickham was educated at the local St Peter's National School, and the Congregation of Christian Brothers' O'Connell School. He started his working life as an apprentice with the Freeman's Journal, before taking a job in the railway carriage and wagon works at the Broadstone, until taking over from Jack Ryder in the FAI.

He had been a founder member of Midland Athletic, and had figured in the losing side of the 1920 Leinster Senior Cup Final against St. James's Gate. He later became the club secretary before holding the post of honorary treasurer and secretary of Bohemians.

He received much attention for his decision not to cancel the soccer match between the Irish team and Yugoslavia in October 1955, under pressure from the Catholic Archbishop of Dublin, John Charles McQuaid, on the premise that Ireland had to play its role in resisting Communism. Both Radio Éireann and the Army Band made themselves unavailable, but this did not deter a crowd of 21,400 supporters arriving at Dalymount Park and passing the picket of Legion of Mary members who carried anti-Communist placards. Ireland eventually lost the match 4–1, and Wickham was denounced from the pulpit in his parish church in Larkhill (for insisting the match be played, not for the result).

He presided over the formation of the Wexford and District League in April 1960 as well as the expansion of the Limerick Desmond League in October 1966.

In 1964, he won the Irish Soccer Writers' Association award for their Personality of the Year. It had been the first time in four years the award had been given to a legislator. It had been given on the back of a highly successful year for the Irish team, which reached the last 8 of a European Nations' Cup Tournament as well as a successful continental tour.

He suffered a heart attack on 30 October 1968 at half time (around 6 p.m. local time) of an international match between Ireland and Poland in Chorzów.
