= 1921–22 FAI Cup =

Tournament details
- Country: Ireland
- Dates: 14 January–8 April 1922
- Teams: 11

Final positions
- Champions: St James's Gate (1st title)
- Runners-up: Shamrock Rovers

Tournament statistics
- Matches played: 13
- Goals scored: 48 (3.69 per match)

The FAI Cup 1921–22 was the first ever edition of Ireland's premier cup competition, The Football Association of Ireland Challenge Cup or FAI Cup. The tournament began on 14 January 1922 and concluded on 8 April with the final replay held at Dalymount Park, Dublin. An official attendance^{[A]} of 10,000 people watched St James's Gate complete the League and Cup Double by defeating Shamrock Rovers in a fixture marred by violence. The winning goal was scored by John "Jack" Kelly.

== First round ==
Tie no	Home team	Score	Away team	Date
1	Dublin United	8-1	Frankfort	14 January 1922
2	Olympia	1-3	Shamrock Rovers	14 January 1922
3	St James's Gate	3-1	Jacobs	14 January 1922
4	West Ham Belfast	0-0	Shelbourne	14 January 1922
replay	Shelbourne	2-1	West Ham Belfast	21 January 1922
5	YMCA	3-4	Athlone Town	14 January 1922

Bye	Bohemians

== Second round ==
Tie no	Home team	Score	Away team	Date
1	Bohemians	7-1	Athlone Town	28 January 1922
2	Shamrock Rovers	5-1	Dublin United	28 January 1922

Bye	Shelbourne
Bye	St James's Gate

== Semi-finals ==
18 February, 1922

St James's Gate	0–0	Shelbourne

Dalymount Park, Dublin

25 February, 1922

Shamrock Rovers	1–0	Bohemians
Flood

Dalymount Park, Dublin

=== Semi-final Replay ===
4 March, 1922

St James's Gate	2–1	Shelbourne
Duncan; Dowdall		Hamilton

Dalymount Park, Dublin

== Final ==
17 March, 1922

St James's Gate	1–1	Shamrock Rovers
Kelly		Campbell

Dalymount Park, Dublin
Referee: M. Broderick Athlone

St James's Gate:
GK	(Ireland) Coleman
FB	(Ireland) Murphy
HB	(Ireland) Kavanagh
FW	(Ireland) McKay
FW	(Ireland) Heaney
FW	(Ireland) Carter
FW	(Ireland) Carey
FW	(Ireland) Kelly
FW	(Ireland) Duncan
FW	(Ireland) Dowdall
FW	(Ireland) Gargan

Shamrock Rovers:
GK	(Ireland) Nagle
FB	(Ireland) Kelly
FB	(Ireland) Warren
HB	(Ireland) Glen
FW	(Ireland) Byrne
FW	(Ireland) Birthistle
FW	(Ireland) Campbell
FW	(Ireland) Cowzer
FW	(Ireland) Flood
FW	(Ireland) Fullam
FW	(Ireland) Doyle

=== Final replay ===
8 April, 1922

St James's Gate	1–0	Shamrock Rovers
Kelly 43

Dalymount Park, Dublin
Referee: M. Broderick Athlone

St James's Gate:
GK	(Ireland) Coleman
FB	(Ireland) Murphy
HB	(Ireland) Kavanagh
FW	(Ireland) McKay
FW	(Ireland) Heaney
FW	(Ireland) O'Shea
FW	(Ireland) Carey
FW	(Ireland) Kelly
FW	(Ireland) Duncan
FW	(Ireland) Dowdall
FW	(Ireland) Gargan

Shamrock Rovers:
GK	(Ireland) Nagle
FB	(Ireland) Kelly
FB	(Ireland) Warren
HB	(Ireland) Glen
FW	(Ireland) Byrne
FW	(Ireland) Birthistle
FW	(Ireland) Campbell
FW	(Ireland) Cowzer
FW	(Ireland) Flood
FW	(Ireland) Fullam
FW	(Ireland) Doyle

== Notes ==
A. Attendances were calculated using gate receipts which limited their accuracy as a large proportion of people, particularly children, attended football matches in Ireland throughout the 20th century for free by a number of means.
