= League of Ireland =

Association football league in Ireland

- Founded: 1921; 105 years ago
- Country: (Republic of Ireland) Ireland (34 teams)
- Other club from: Northern Ireland (1 team)
- Confederation: UEFA
- Divisions: Premier Division; First Division; National League; Women's Premier Division; MU20 Division; MU17 Division; WU17 Division; MU15 Division; MU14 Division
- Number of clubs: 55
- Level on pyramid: 1–3
- Domestic cup(s): FAI Cup; President's Cup
- League cup: League of Ireland Cup
- Current champions: Shamrock Rovers F.C. (22nd title) (2025)
- Most championships: Shamrock Rovers (22 titles)
- Most appearances: (Republic of Ireland) Al Finucane (612)
- Top scorer: Brendan Bradley (235)
- Broadcasters: Virgin Media Television; BBC NI; LOI TV
- Website: leagueofireland.ie
- Current: 2026 League of Ireland

The League of Ireland is a national association football league consisting of professional clubs in the Republic of Ireland and Derry City F.C. in Northern Ireland. It is governed by the Football Association of Ireland. It was the name of the single division top-level football league in the Republic of Ireland from its foundation in 1921 until the introduction of a second division in 1985, upon which it became the name of the league in its entirety.

There are three divisions in the league as of the end of the 2025 season – the Premier Division and First Division for men, and the Women's Premier Division. From 2026, a third tier for men, the National League is anticipated to begin play.

The men's league is divided into the Premier Division and the First Division with ten teams in each division, and promotion and relegation between the highest-placed teams in the First Division and the lowest-placed teams in the Premier Division. From 2026, the National League will consist of a further twenty teams in two parallel conferences of ten teams, North and South. Underage divisions include the U19 Division, U17 Division, U15 Division, and most recently the U14 Division.

Of the twenty teams currently in the Premier Division and First Division, nineteen teams are located in the Republic of Ireland, while one – Derry City – is located in Northern Ireland. League teams also participated in two knockout cup competitions: the FAI Cup, organised by the FAI, and until its suspension in 2020, the League of Ireland Cup.

The league has always worked closely with the FAI, with which it formally merged in 2006. The league is currently sponsored by SSE Airtricity, and as such is known as the SSE Airtricity League for sponsorship reasons. In 2007, it became one of the first leagues in Europe to introduce a salary cap.

== History ==
=== First level ===
The League of Ireland was founded in 1921 as a single division known as the A Division. The inaugural season featured eight teams from County Dublin, all of whom had spent the 1920–21 season playing in the Leinster Senior League: Bohemians, Dublin United, Frankfort, Jacobs, Olympia, St James's Gate, Shelbourne and YMCA. Bohemians and Shelbourne had previously played in the 1919–20 Irish League. St James's Gate were the inaugural champions, and also went on to complete a treble, having also won both the FAI Cup and the Leinster Senior Cup.

The League expanded to twelve teams in 1922–23. Among the new members were Shamrock Rovers, who would win the title at the first attempt, and Athlone Town, who became the first team from outside County Dublin to compete in the League. Along with Bohemians and Shelbourne, Shamrock Rovers would go on to dominate the League during the 1920s and 1930s.

Bray Unknowns and Fordsons became the second and third teams from outside County Dublin to join the League in 1924–25, the latter also becoming the first team from Munster to play in the league. The League continued to expand both numerically and geographically during its first two decades, with Dundalk being elected in 1926–27 and subsequently becoming the first team from outside County Dublin to win the title in 1932–33. Dundalk were subsequently joined by Waterford in 1930–31, Cork Bohemians in 1932–33, Sligo Rovers in 1934–35 and Limerick in 1937–38. Sligo Rovers became only the second team from outside County Dublin to win the title in 1936–37.

Cork United emerged as the strongest team in the League during the Emergency, winning five titles between 1940–41 and 1945–46, three of which in succession. However, they subsequently resigned from the League in 1948.

The 1950s was marked by the emergence of St Patrick's Athletic and the re-emergence of Shamrock Rovers, with the former winning the title at the first attempt in 1951–52 and claiming two more in the middle of the decade, and the latter winning their first title in fifteen years in 1953–54. While Drumcondra and Dundalk won two titles each during the 1960s, Waterford were the dominant team of the decade by winning four titles, including three in succession between 1967–68 and 1969–70. Six different teams won the title during the 1970s, with Bohemians, Dundalk and Waterford each winning two titles. While Athlone Town won two titles at the start of the 1980s, the decade was marked by the four successive titles won by Shamrock Rovers between 1983–84 and 1986–87.

Following the conclusion of the 1984–85 season, the League was restructured and the A Division was replaced by the Premier Division.

In 2002, the league was branded as the Eircom League after sponsors, Eircom.

=== Second level ===
A second division known as the B Division was introduced in 1964–65, featuring reserve teams and emerging senior teams. This led to the original league occasionally being referred to as the A Division. While there was no formal promotion and relegation to and from the A Division, a number of B Division teams — including Athlone Town, Bray Wanderers, Home Farm, Longford Town, Monaghan United and UCD — were subsequently elected to the A Division.

In 1985, the B Division was replaced as the second-level of the football pyramid when the First Division was introduced to the League of Ireland. The First Division consisted solely of first teams, with promotion to and relegation from the new Premier Division.

=== Third level ===
A third division known as the A Championship was introduced in 2008, and like the former B Division featured reserve teams and emerging senior teams. However, unlike the B Division, there was promotion and relegation between the Premier Division, First Division and A Championship.

The A Championship was disbanded following the conclusion of the 2011 season.

The FAI announced a new third tier, the National League, on 12 December 2024. The National League will be integrated into the existing football pyramid in Ireland, offering a clear route for promotion and relegation to and from the League of Ireland. The FAI aims to recruit 20 clubs in total for the new league, split into north and south divisions. On 19 December 2025, fifteen clubs were announced as the founding teams of the FAI National League, a new step in the Republic of Ireland football league pyramid. The competition is expected to commence with a truncated league season, beginning in Autumn 2026.

=== Youth leagues ===
A number of youth leagues have also been introduced since the 2000–01 season.

- The original men's youth league was an under-21 division, and later became an under-20 division before becoming an under-19 division, the winners of which are awarded the Dr Tony O'Neill Cup. In February 2024, the league returned to under-20 status.
- A women's under-19 youth league was introduced in 2021. In September 2025, this was replaced by an expanded under-23 development league, funded by UEFA.
- A men's under-17 division was introduced in 2015. A women's under-17 division followed in July 2018.
- An under-15 division for boys was introduced with a truncated season in 2017, before fully aligning with the league calendar in 2018. A limited number of overage players are allowed to play in this division.
- An Under-13 division for boys was introduced in March 2019. The 20 League of Ireland teams were joined by four non-league entities in entering a team; the four entities were Kildare & District Underage League, Kerry League, Mayo League and Monaghan/Cavan FP. The 24 teams were divided into four leagues of six teams each, with the top two teams from each league, along with two best-placed third-placed teams, set to qualify for a finals stage. The Coronavirus pandemic sports shutdown forced this to become an Under-14 division, to accommodate players who had lost a year, and this change later became permanent.

== Competition ==
=== League structure ===
There are 20 teams in the League, organised into two divisions: the Premier Division (formerly the A Division) and the First Division (formerly the B Division), which were renamed in 1985. There are ten teams in each division, and in a given season each team plays the other nine four times: twice at home and twice away, resulting in a total of 36 games per season.

Teams gain three points for a win, one for a draw, and zero for a loss. At the end of the season, the last-placed team in the Premier Division is relegated, with the winner of the First Division being promoted in their place. The second- to fourth-placed teams in the First Division compete in a playoff series, the winner of which plays the ninth-placed team in the Premier Division to determine the final place in the Premier Division for the following season.

| Division | Promotion and relegation |
|---|---|
| Premier Division | 1 direct relegation 0 or 1 relegation via playoffs |
| First Division | 1 direct promotion 0 or 1 promotion via playoffs |

=== Transfer regulations ===
Player transfers may only take place within predetermined transfer windows. The winter transfer window for the League of Ireland is open from 1 December to February 22, making it one of the longest in the men’s professional game. Player registrations cannot be exchanged outside these windows.

== Teams ==
=== 2026 Premier Division ===
Locations of Premier Division teams
Locations of Dublin Premier Division teams

| Team | Home city/suburb | Stadium | Capacity |
|---|---|---|---|
| Bohemians | Dublin (Phibsborough) | Dalymount Park | 4,500 |
| Derry City | Derry | Brandywell | 6,300 |
| Drogheda United | Drogheda | United Park | 2,500 |
| Dundalk | Dundalk | Oriel Park | 4,500 |
| Galway United | Galway | Eamonn Deacy Park | 5,000 |
| St Patrick's Athletic | Dublin (Inchicore) | Richmond Park | 5,500 |
| Shamrock Rovers | Dublin (Tallaght) | Tallaght Stadium | 10,716 |
| Shelbourne | Dublin (Drumcondra) | Tolka Park | 5,700 |
| Sligo Rovers | Sligo | The Showgrounds | 4,200 |
| Waterford | Waterford | RSC | 5,160 |

=== 2026 First Division ===
Locations of the First Division teams

| Team | Home city/suburb | Stadium |
|---|---|---|
| Athlone Town | Athlone | Athlone Town Stadium |
| Bray Wanderers | Bray | Carlisle Grounds |
| Cobh Ramblers | Cobh | St. Colman's Park |
| Cork City | Cork | Turners Cross |
| Finn Harps | Ballybofey | Finn Park |
| Kerry | Tralee | Mounthawk Park |
| Longford Town | Longford | Bishopsgate |
| Treaty United | Limerick | Markets Field |
| UCD | Dublin | UCD Bowl |
| Wexford | Crossabeg | Ferrycarrig Park |

=== Former League of Ireland clubs ===
Apart from the current twenty members, at least 38 other clubs have competed in the League of Ireland at one time or another. Some of these clubs are still active, playing in intermediate and junior leagues. The list below only includes teams that played in the A Division, the Premier Division and the First Division.

| Team | Home town/suburb | Home ground | Current league |
|---|---|---|---|
| Albert Rovers | Cork | Flower Lodge | |
| Bray Unknowns | Bray | Carlisle Grounds | |
| Brideville | The Liberties, Dublin | Richmond Park; Harold's Cross Stadium | |
| Brooklyn | Merchants Quay | Chalgrove Terrace | |
| Cabinteely | Cabinteely, Dublin | Kilbogget Park | |
| Cork | Cork | The Mardyke | |
| Cork City | Cork | The Mardyke | |
| Cork Alberts | Cork | Flower Lodge; Turners Cross | |
| Cork Athletic | Cork | The Mardyke | |
| Cork Bohemians | Cork | Turners Cross | |
| Cork Hibernians | Cork | The Mardyke | |
| Cork United | Cork | The Mardyke | |
| Dolphin | Dolphin's Barn | Dolphin Park; Harold's Cross Stadium; Tolka Park | |
| Drumcondra | Drumcondra, Dublin | Tolka Park | Leinster Senior League |
| Dublin City | Fingal | various | |
| Dublin United | Donnybrook, Dublin | Beech Hill; Anglesea Road | |
| Evergreen United / Cork Celtic | Cork | Turners Cross | |
| Fordsons | Cork | Ballinlough Road | |
| Frankfort | Drumcondra, Dublin | Richmond Road | |
| Home Farm | Whitehall, Dublin | Tolka Park | Leinster Senior League |
| Jacobs | Crumlin, Dublin | Rutland Avenue | |
| Kildare County | Newbridge, County Kildare | Station Road | |
| Kilkenny City | Kilkenny | Buckley Park | |
| Limerick | Limerick | Markets Field | |
| Mervue United | Galway | Fahy's Field | Galway & District League |
| Midland Athletic | Whitehall, Dublin | The Thatch | |
| Monaghan United | Monaghan | Gortakeegan | Monaghan Cavan League |
| Newcastlewest | Newcastle West | Ballygowan Park | Limerick Desmond League |
| Olympia | The Coombe, Dublin | Bellevue Lodge | |
| Pioneers | Dublin | Strand Hall; The Thatch | Leinster Senior League |
| Rathmines Athletic | Rathmines | Rathmines Park | |
| Reds United | Ringsend | Glenmalure Park | |
| Salthill Devon | Salthill | Drom Soccer Park | Galway & District League |
| St. Francis | The Liberties/Clondalkin | John Hyland Park | Leinster Senior League |
| St. James's Gate | Crumlin, Dublin | Iveagh Grounds | Leinster Senior League |
| Shelbourne United | Ringsend | Beech Hill; Anglesea Road; Glenmalure Park | |
| Shamrock Rovers B | Tallaght | Tallaght Stadium | |
| Sporting Fingal | Fingal | Morton Stadium | |
| Thurles Town | Thurles | Thurles Greyhound Stadium | North Tipperary District League |
| Transport | Bray/Harold's Cross | Carlisle Grounds; Harold's Cross Stadium | Leinster Senior League |
| YMCA | Sandymount | YMCA Sports Grounds | |

== Champions ==
=== First level ===
==== A Division ====
| Season | Champions | Runners-up | Third place |
|---|---|---|---|
| 1921–22 | St. James's Gate (1) | Bohemians | Shelbourne |
| 1922–23 | Shamrock Rovers (1) | Shelbourne | Bohemians |
| 1923–24 | Bohemians (1) | Shelbourne | Jacobs |
| 1924–25 | Shamrock Rovers (2) | Bohemians | Shelbourne |
| 1925–26 | Shelbourne (1) | Shamrock Rovers | Fordsons |
| 1926–27 | Shamrock Rovers (3) | Shelbourne | Bohemians |
| 1927–28 | Bohemians (2) | Shelbourne | Shamrock Rovers |
| 1928–29 | Shelbourne (2) | Bohemians | Shamrock Rovers |
| 1929–30 | Bohemians (3) | Shelbourne | Shamrock Rovers |
| 1930–31 | Shelbourne (3) | Dundalk | Bohemians |
| 1931–32 | Shamrock Rovers (4) | Cork | Waterford |
| 1932–33 | Dundalk (1) | Shamrock Rovers | Shelbourne |
| 1933–34 | Bohemians (4) | Cork | Shamrock Rovers |
| 1934–35 | Dolphin (1) | St. James's Gate | Sligo Rovers |
| 1935–36 | Bohemians (5) | Dolphin | Cork |
| 1936–37 | Sligo Rovers (1) | Dundalk | Waterford |
| 1937–38 | Shamrock Rovers (5) | Waterford | Dundalk |
| 1938–39 | Shamrock Rovers (6) | Sligo Rovers | Dundalk |
| 1939–40 | St. James's Gate (2) | Shamrock Rovers | Sligo Rovers |
| 1940–41 | Cork United (1) | Waterford | Bohemians |
| 1941–42 | Cork United (2) | Shamrock Rovers | Shelbourne |
| 1942–43 | Cork United (3) | Dundalk | Drumcondra |
| 1943–44 | Shelbourne (4) | Limerick | Shamrock Rovers |
| 1944–45 | Cork United (4) | Limerick | Shamrock Rovers |
| 1945–46 | Cork United (5) | Drumcondra | Waterford |
| 1946–47 | Shelbourne (5) | Drumcondra | Shamrock Rovers |
| 1947–48 | Drumcondra (1) | Dundalk | Shelbourne |
| 1948–49 | Drumcondra (2) | Shelbourne | Dundalk |
| 1949–50 | Cork Athletic (1) | Drumcondra | Shelbourne |
| 1950–51 | Cork Athletic (2) | Sligo Rovers | Drumcondra |
| 1951–52 | St. Patrick's Athletic (1) | Shelbourne | Shamrock Rovers |
| 1952–53 | Shelbourne (6) | Drumcondra | Shamrock Rovers |
| 1953–54 | Shamrock Rovers (7) | Evergreen United | Drumcondra |
| 1954–55 | St. Patrick's Athletic (2) | Waterford | Shamrock Rovers |
| 1955–56 | St. Patrick's Athletic (3) | Shamrock Rovers | Waterford |
| 1956–57 | Shamrock Rovers (8) | Drumcondra | Sligo Rovers |
| 1957–58 | Drumcondra (3) | Shamrock Rovers | Evergreen United |
| 1958–59 | Shamrock Rovers (9) | Evergreen United | Waterford |
| 1959–60 | Limerick (1) | Cork Celtic | Shelbourne |
| 1960–61 | Drumcondra (4) | St. Patrick's Athletic | Waterford |
| 1961–62 | Shelbourne (7) | Cork Celtic | Shamrock Rovers |
| 1962–63 | Dundalk (2) | Waterford | Drumcondra |
| 1963–64 | Shamrock Rovers (10) | Dundalk | Limerick |
| 1964–65 | Drumcondra (5) | Shamrock Rovers | Bohemians |
| 1965–66 | Waterford (1) | Shamrock Rovers | Bohemians |
| 1966–67 | Dundalk (3) | Bohemians | Sligo Rovers |
| 1967–68 | Waterford (2) | Dundalk | Cork Celtic |
| 1968–69 | Waterford (3) | Shamrock Rovers | Cork Hibernians |
| 1969–70 | Waterford (4) | Shamrock Rovers | Cork Hibernians |
| 1970–71 | Cork Hibernians (1) | Shamrock Rovers | Waterford |
| 1971–72 | Waterford (5) | Cork Hibernians | Bohemians |
| 1972–73 | Waterford (6) | Finn Harps | Bohemians |
| 1973–74 | Cork Celtic (1) | Bohemians | Cork Hibernians |
| 1974–75 | Bohemians (6) | Athlone Town | Finn Harps |
| 1975–76 | Dundalk (4) | Finn Harps | Waterford |
| 1976–77 | Sligo Rovers (2) | Bohemians | Drogheda United |
| 1977–78 | Bohemians (7) | Finn Harps | Drogheda United |
| 1978–79 | Dundalk (5) | Bohemians | Drogheda United |
| 1979–80 | Limerick United (2) | Dundalk | Athlone Town |
| 1980–81 | Athlone Town (1) | Dundalk | Limerick United |
| 1981–82 | Dundalk (6) | Shamrock Rovers | Bohemians |
| 1982–83 | Athlone Town (2) | Drogheda United | Dundalk |
| 1983–84 | Shamrock Rovers (11) | Bohemians | Athlone Town |
| 1984–85 | Shamrock Rovers (12) | Bohemians | Athlone Town |

==== Premier Division ====
| Season | Champions | Runners–up | Third place |
|---|---|---|---|
| 1985–86 | Shamrock Rovers (13) | Galway United | Dundalk |
| 1986–87 | Shamrock Rovers (14) | Dundalk | Bohemians |
| 1987–88 | Dundalk (7) | St Patrick's Athletic | Bohemians |
| 1988–89 | Derry City (1) | Dundalk | Limerick City |
| 1989–90 | St Patrick's Athletic (4) | Derry City | Dundalk |
| 1990–91 | Dundalk (8) | Cork City | St Patrick's Athletic |
| 1991–92 | Shelbourne (8) | Derry City | Cork City |
| 1992–93 | Cork City (1) | Bohemians | Shelbourne |
| 1993–94 | Shamrock Rovers (15) | Cork City | Galway United |
| 1994–95 | Dundalk (9) | Derry City | Shelbourne |
| 1995–96 | St Patrick's Athletic (5) | Bohemians | Sligo Rovers |
| 1996–97 | Derry City (2) | Bohemians | Shelbourne |
| 1997–98 | St Patrick's Athletic (6) | Shelbourne | Cork City |
| 1998–99 | St Patrick's Athletic (7) | Cork City | Shelbourne |
| 1999–00 | Shelbourne (9) | Cork City | Bohemians |
| 2000–01 | Bohemians (8) | Shelbourne | Cork City |
| 2001–02 | Shelbourne (10) | Shamrock Rovers | St Patrick's Athletic |
| 2002–03 | Bohemians (9) | Shelbourne | Shamrock Rovers |
| 2003 | Shelbourne (11) | Bohemians | Cork City |
| 2004 | Shelbourne (12) | Cork City | Bohemians |
| 2005 | Cork City (2) | Derry City | Shelbourne |
| 2006 | Shelbourne (13) | Derry City | Drogheda United |
| 2007 | Drogheda United (1) | St Patrick's Athletic | Bohemians |
| 2008 | Bohemians (10) | St Patrick's Athletic | Derry City |
| 2009 | Bohemians (11) | Shamrock Rovers | Cork City |
| 2010 | Shamrock Rovers (16) | Bohemians | Sligo Rovers |
| 2011 | Shamrock Rovers (17) | Sligo Rovers | Derry City |
| 2012 | Sligo Rovers (3) | Drogheda United | St Patrick's Athletic |
| 2013 | St Patrick's Athletic (8) | Dundalk | Sligo Rovers |
| 2014 | Dundalk (10) | Cork City | St Patrick's Athletic |
| 2015 | Dundalk (11) | Cork City | Shamrock Rovers |
| 2016 | Dundalk (12) | Cork City | Derry City |
| 2017 | Cork City (3) | Dundalk | Shamrock Rovers |
| 2018 | Dundalk (13) | Cork City | Shamrock Rovers |
| 2019 | Dundalk (14) | Shamrock Rovers | Bohemians |
| 2020 | Shamrock Rovers (18) | Bohemians | Dundalk |
| 2021 | Shamrock Rovers (19) | St Patrick's Athletic | Sligo Rovers |
| 2022 | Shamrock Rovers (20) | Derry City | Dundalk |
| 2023 | Shamrock Rovers (21) | Derry City | St Patrick's Athletic |
| 2024 | Shelbourne (14) | Shamrock Rovers | St Patrick's Athletic |
| 2025 | Shamrock Rovers (22) | Derry City | Shelbourne |
| 2026 | Shamrock Rovers (23) | Bohemians | St Patrick's Athletic |

== List of champions ==
=== By number of titles ===
| Club | First level | Second level | Total |
|---|---|---|---|
| Shamrock Rovers | 23 | 1 | 24 |
| Dundalk | 14 | 3 | 17 |
| Shelbourne | 14 | 2 | 16 |
| Bohemians | 11 | 0 | 11 |
| St Patrick's Athletic | 8 | 0 | 8 |
| Waterford | 6 | 4 | 10 |
| Cork United | 5 | 0 | 5 |
| Drumcondra | 5 | 0 | 5 |
| Cork City | 3 | 3 | 6 |
| Sligo Rovers | 3 | 2 | 5 |
| Limerick United | 2 | 3 | 5 |
| Athlone Town | 2 | 2 | 4 |
| Derry City | 2 | 2 | 4 |
| Cork Athletic | 2 | 0 | 2 |
| St James's Gate | 2 | 0 | 2 |
| Drogheda United | 1 | 5 | 6 |
| Cork Celtic | 1 | 0 | 1 |
| Cork Hibernians | 1 | 0 | 1 |
| Dolphin | 1 | 0 | 1 |
| Bray Wanderers | 0 | 3 | 3 |
| UCD | 0 | 3 | 3 |
| Galway United | 0 | 2 | 2 |
| Cobh Ramblers | 0 | 1 | 1 |
| Dublin City | 0 | 1 | 1 |
| Finn Harps | 0 | 1 | 1 |
| Kilkenny City | 0 | 1 | 1 |
| Longford Town | 0 | 1 | 1 |
| Wexford | 0 | 1 | 1 |

=== By team ===
| Club | Titles | Seasons | Runners-up | Seasons |
|---|---|---|---|---|
| Shamrock Rovers | 23 | 1922–23, 1924–25, 1926–27, 1931–32, 1937–38, 1938–39, 1953–54, 1956–57, 1958–59, 1963–64, 1983–84, 1984–85, 1985–86, 1986–87, 1993–94, 2010, 2011, 2020, 2021, 2022, 2023, 2025, 2026 | 16 | 1925–26, 1932–33, 1939–40, 1941–42, 1955–56, 1957–58, 1964–65, 1965–66, 1968–69, 1969–70, 1970–71, 1981–82, 2001-02, 2009, 2019, 2024 |
| Dundalk | 14 | 1932–33, 1962–63, 1966–67, 1975–76, 1978–79, 1981–82, 1987–88, 1990–91, 1994–95, 2014, 2015, 2016, 2018, 2019 | 12 | 1930–31, 1936–37, 1942–43, 1947–48, 1963–64, 1967–68, 1979–80, 1980–81, 1986–87, 1988–89, 2013, 2017 |
| Shelbourne | 14 | 1925–26, 1928–29, 1930–31, 1943–44, 1946–47, 1952–53, 1961–62, 1991–92, 1999–2000, 2001–02, 2003, 2004, 2006, 2024 | 10 | 1922–23, 1923–24, 1926–27, 1927–28, 1929–30, 1948–49, 1951–52, 1997–98, 2000–01, 2002–03 |
| Bohemians | 11 | 1923–24, 1927–28, 1929–30, 1933–34, 1935–36, 1974–75, 1977–78, 2000–01, 2002–03, 2008, 2009 | 15 | 1921–22, 1924–25, 1928–29, 1966–67, 1973–74, 1976–77, 1978–79, 1983–84, 1984–85, 1992–93, 1995–96, 1996–97, 2003, 2010, 2020 |
| St Patrick's Athletic | 8 | 1951–52, 1954–55, 1955–56, 1989–90, 1995–96, 1997–98, 1998–99, 2013 | 5 | 1960–61, 1987–88, 2007, 2008, 2021 |
| Waterford | 6 | 1965–66, 1967–68, 1968–69, 1969–70, 1971–72, 1972–73 | 4 | 1937–38, 1940–41, 1954–55, 1962–63 |
| Drumcondra | 5 | 1947–48, 1948–49, 1957–58, 1960–61, 1964–65 | 5 | 1945–46, 1946–47, 1949–50, 1952–53, 1956–57 |
| Cork United | 5 | 1940–41, 1941–42, 1942–43, 1944–45, 1945–46 | 0 | |
| Cork City | 3 | 1992–93, 2005, 2017 | 9 | 1990–91, 1993–94, 1998–99, 1999–2000, 2004, 2014, 2015, 2016, 2018 |
| Sligo Rovers | 3 | 1936–37, 1976–77, 2012 | 3 | 1938–39, 1950–51, 2011 |
| Derry City | 2 | 1988–89, 1996–97 | 8 | 1989–90, 1991–92, 1994–95, 2005, 2006, 2022, 2023, 2025 |
| Limerick | 2 | 1959–60, 1979–80 | 2 | 1943–44, 1944–45 |
| St James's Gate | 2 | 1921–22, 1939–40 | 1 | 1934–35 |
| Athlone Town | 2 | 1980–81, 1982–83 | 1 | 1974–75 |
| Cork Athletic | 2 | 1949–50, 1950–51 | 0 | |
| Cork Celtic | 1 | 1973–74 | 4 | 1953–54, 1958–59, 1959–60, 1961–62 |
| Drogheda United | 1 | 2007 | 2 | 1982–83, 2012 |
| Dolphin | 1 | 1934–35 | 1 | 1935–36 |
| Cork Hibernians | 1 | 1970–71 | 1 | 1971–72 |
| Finn Harps | 0 | | 3 | 1972–73, 1975–76, 1977–78 |
| Cork | 0 | | 2 | 1931–32, 1933–34 |
| Galway United | 0 | | 1 | 1985–86 |

=== By county ===
| County | Titles | Most successful club |
|---|---|---|
| Dublin | 60 | Shamrock Rovers (22) |
| Louth | 15 | Dundalk (14) |
| Cork | 12 | Cork United (5) |
| Waterford | 6 | Waterford (6) |
| Sligo | 3 | Sligo Rovers (3) |
| Derry | 2 | Derry City (2) |
| Limerick | 2 | Limerick (2) |
| Westmeath | 2 | Athlone Town (2) |

=== By season ===
For each season, the number of teams competing (in brackets) are shown.

==== Premier Division ====
| Team | 2020 | 2021 | 2022 | 2023 | 2024 | 2025 | 2026 | 2027 | Years |
|---|---|---|---|---|---|---|---|---|---|
| Bohemians | 2nd | 5th | 6th | 6th | 8th | 4th | 2nd | - | 8 |
| Cork City | 10th | | | 9th | | 10th | | - | 4 |
| Derry City | 7th | 4th | 2nd | 2nd | 4th | 2nd | 5th | - | 8 |
| Drogheda United | | 7th | 8th | 7th | 9th | 6th | 9th | | 6 |
| Dundalk | 3rd | 6th | 3rd | 5th | 10th | | 6th | - | 7 |
| Finn Harps | 8th | 8th | 10th | | | | | | 3 |
| Galway United | | | | | 5th | 8th | 8th | - | 4 |
| Longford Town | | 10th | | | | | | | 1 |
| Shamrock Rovers | 1st | 1st | 1st | 1st | 2nd | 1st | 1st | - | 8 |
| Shelbourne | 9th | | 7th | 4th | 1st | 3rd | 4th | - | 7 |
| Sligo Rovers | 4th | 3rd | 5th | 8th | 6th | 7th | 10th | | 7 |
| St Patrick's Athletic | 6th | 2nd | 4th | 3rd | 3rd | 5th | 3rd | - | 8 |
| UCD | | | 9th | 10th | | | | - | 3 |
| Waterford | 5th | 9th | | | 7th | 9th | 7th | - | 5 |

==== First Division ====
| Team | 2020 | 2021 | 2022 (Note: Following the merger of Bray Wanderers and Cabinteely, no new teams applied for a First Division licence so the league only had 9 teams in 2022.) | 2023 | 2024 | 2025 | 2026 | 2027 | Years |
|---|---|---|---|---|---|---|---|---|---|
| Athlone Town | 9th | 7th | 8th | 5th | 4th | 10th | 7th | - | 8 |
| Bray Wanderers | 2nd | 5th | 7th | 7th | 5th | 3rd | 3rd | - | 8 |
| Cabinteely | 7th | 9th | | | | | | | 2 |
| Cobh Ramblers | 6th | 8th | 9th | 3rd | 8th | 2nd | 6th | - | 8 |
| Cork City | | 6th | **1st** | | **1st** | | **1st** | | 4 |
| Drogheda United | **1st** | | | | | | | | 1 |
| Dundalk | | | | | | **1st** | | | 1 |
| Finn Harps | | | | 9th | 6th | 8th | 10th | - | 5 |
| Galway United | 5th | 2nd | 3rd | **1st** | | | | | 4 |
| Kerry | | | | 10th | 10th | 9th | 4th | - | 5 |
| Longford Town | **4th** | | 4th | 8th | 9th | 6th | 5th | - | 7 |
| Shamrock Rovers II | 8th | | | | | | | | 1 |
| Shelbourne | | **1st** | | | | | | | 1 |
| Sligo Rovers | | | | | | | | - | 1 |
| Treaty United | | 4th | 5th | 6th | 7th | 5th | 9th | - | 7 |
| UCD | 3rd | **3rd** | | | 2nd | 4th | **2nd** | | 5 |
| Waterford | | | 2nd | **2nd** | | | | | 2 |
| Wexford | 10th | 10th | 6th | 4th | 3rd | 7th | 8th | - | 8 |

Bold indicates teams who were promoted.

== Media coverage ==
League of Ireland games are broadcast free-to-air on Virgin Media Television and available on LOI TV, the league's official streaming site, via subscription.

TV3 owned the rights to a long-running weekly League of Ireland highlights programme until 2007. In 2008, an agreement was reached between RTÉ and the Football Association of Ireland (FAI) on broadcasting rights for the League of Ireland up to 2013. As a part of the deal, RTÉ would broadcast a weekly show called 'Monday Night Soccer' and show live matches on its 'Airtricty League Live' programme. The first edition was broadcast on Monday, 10 March 2008, and presented by Tony O'Donoghue.

It was announced in August 2014 that RTÉ would show 78 live Premier Division and FAI Cup games as part of a new agreement with the FAI. The agreement was set to run until November 2018. From March 2014, RTÉ also broadcast a highlights show, Soccer Republic, throughout the season.

In 2015 the FAI agreed a deal with TrackChamp to stream all Premier Division and First Division games outside Ireland, but the deal was criticised by customers as the streaming service required registration for a betting platform.

On 27 January 2025, it was announced that Virgin Media Television would become the "sole and exclusive free-to-air broadcaster of the SSE Airtricity Men’s Premier Division" for the next four years, pledging to show one live game from each round of the division. A new radio deal for broadcasting on Newstalk was announced just before the season started. In June 2026, the league announced a broadcasting partnership with BBC Sport NI to show Derry City's home fixtures across the United Kingdom on the BBC iPlayer.

== Attendance ==
In 2024 attendances across the League of Ireland broke the million mark for the first time ever; a total of 1,001,630 fans went to games in the SSE Airtricity Men's Premier Division, First Division, SSE Airtricity Women’s Premier Division, men's and women's FAI Cups, the All-Island Cup and European matches. The following year 1,127,155 spectators attended games involving League of Ireland teams.

=== Premier Division ===
| Season | Total | Average | Highest | Ref. |
|---|---|---|---|---|
| 2005 | – | – | 7,000 | |
| 2006 | 257,745 | 1,562 | 6,080 | |
| 2007 | – | – | – | |
| 2008 | – | – | 6,870 | |
| 2009 | – | – | 6,000 | |
| 2010 | – | – | 5,500 | |
| 2011 | – | – | 5,916 | |
| 2012 | 281,925 | 1,575 | 6,097 | |
| 2013 | 307,355 | 1,552 | 4,703 | |
| 2014 | 295,384 | 1,523 | 6,219 | |
| 2015 | 324,332 | 1,638 | 6,900 | |
| 2016 | 291,258 | 1,471 | 5,453 | |
| 2017 | 377,362 | 1,906 | 6,983 | |
| 2018 | 384,520 | 2,136 | 6,672 | |
| 2019 | 375,705 | 2,087 | 7,021 | |
| 2020 | 65,700 | 2,986 | 7,522 | (Note: Total attendance and average attendance figures only account for the first four weeks of the season after which no spectators were allowed due to the COVID-19 pandemic) |
| 2021 | – | – | 7,765 | |
| 2022 | 486,365 | 2,687 | 7,726 | |
| 2023 | 596,196 | 3,294 | 8,021 | |
| 2024 | 628,178 | 3,490 | 10,094 | |
| 2025 | 683,208 | 3,775 | 33,208 | |

Key
| | Record high |
| | Record low |
| * | Affected by the COVID-19 pandemic |

=== First Division ===
| Season | Total | Average | Highest | Ref. |
|---|---|---|---|---|
| 2016 | 52,987 | 477 | – | |
| 2017 | 53,342 | 476 | – | |
| 2018 | 59,946 | 422 | – | |
| 2019 | 75,795 | 561 | – | |
| 2020 | – | – | – | |
| 2021 | – | – | – | |
| 2022 | 178,000 | 1,193 | – | |
| 2023 | 196,050 | 1,089 | – | |
| 2024 | 165,163 | 918 | 5,507 | |
| 2025 | 157,095 | 872 | 3,358 | |

== European record ==
=== European Cup/UEFA Champions League ===
| Season | Club | Round | Opponent | Home | Away | Agg |
|---|---|---|---|---|---|---|
| 1957–58 | Shamrock Rovers | PR | (England) Manchester United | 0–6 | 2–3 | 2–9 |
| 1958–59 | Drumcondra | PR | (Spain) Atlético Madrid | 1–5 | 0–8 | 1–13 |
| 1959–60 | Shamrock Rovers | PR | (France) Nice | 1–1 | 2–3 | 3–4 |
| 1960–61 | Limerick | PR | (Switzerland) Young Boys | 0–5 | 2–4 | 2–9 |
| 1961–62 | Drumcondra | PR | (Germany) 1. FC Nürnberg | 1–4 | 0–5 | 1–9 |
| 1962–63 | Shelbourne | PR | (Portugal) Sporting CP | 0–2 | 1–5 | 1–7 |
| 1963–64 | Dundalk | PR | (Switzerland) Zürich | 0–3 | 2–1 | 2–4 |
| 1964–65 | Shamrock Rovers | PR | (Austria) Rapid Wien | 0–2 | 0–3 | 0–5 |
| 1965–66 | Drumcondra | PR | (East Germany) Vorwärts Berlin | 1–0 | 0–3 | 1–3 |
| 1966–67 | Waterford | PR | (East Germany) Vorwärts Berlin | 1–6 | 0–6 | 1–12 |
| 1967–68 | Dundalk | R1 | (Hungary) Vasas | 0–1 | 1–8 | 1–9 |
| 1968–69 | Waterford | R1 | (England) Manchester United | 1–3 | 1–7 | 2–10 |
| 1969–70 | Waterford | R1 | (Turkey) Galatasaray | 2–3 | 0–2 | 2–5 |
| 1970–71 | Waterford | R1 | (Northern Ireland) Glentoran | 1–0 | 3–1 | 4–1 |
| 1970–71 | Waterford | R2 | (Scotland) Celtic | 0–7 | 2–3 | 2–10 |
| 1971–72 | Cork Hibernians | R1 | (Germany) Borussia Mönchengladbach | 0–5 | 1–2 | 1–7 |
| 1972–73 | Waterford | R1 | (Cyprus) Omonia | 2–1 | 0–2 | 2–3 |
| 1973–74 | Waterford | R1 | (Hungary) Újpest | 2–3 | 0–3 | 2–6 |
| 1974–75 | Cork Celtic | R1 | (Cyprus) Omonia | w/o (Note: Omonia withdrew due to the Turkish invasion of Cyprus.) | | |
| 1974–75 | Cork Celtic | R2 | (Soviet Union) Ararat Yerevan | 1–2 | 0–5 | 1–7 |
| 1975–76 | Bohemians | R1 | (Scotland) Rangers | 1–1 | 1–4 | 2–5 |
| 1976–77 | Dundalk | R1 | (Netherlands) PSV Eindhoven | 1–1 | 0–6 | 1–7 |
| 1977–78 | Sligo Rovers | R1 | (Socialist Federal Republic of Yugoslavia) Red Star Belgrade | 0–3 | 0–3 | 0–6 |
| 1978–79 | Bohemians | R1 | (Cyprus) Omonia | 1–0 | 1–2 | 2–2 (a) |
| 1978–79 | Bohemians | R2 | (East Germany) Dynamo Dresden | 0–0 | 0–6 | 0–6 |
| 1979–80 | Dundalk | PR | (Northern Ireland) Linfield | 1–1 | 2–0 | 3–1 |
| 1979–80 | Dundalk | R1 | (Malta) Hibernians | 2–0 | 0–1 | 2–1 |
| 1979–80 | Dundalk | R2 | (Scotland) Celtic | 0–0 | 2–3 | 2–3 |
| 1980–81 | Limerick | R1 | (Spain) Real Madrid | 1–2 | 1–5 | 2–7 |
| 1981–82 | Athlone Town | R1 | (Denmark) KB | 1–1 | 2–2 | 3–3 (a) |
| 1982–83 | Dundalk | R1 | (England) Liverpool | 1–4 | 0–1 | 1–5 |
| 1983–84 | Athlone Town | R1 | (Belgium) Standard Liège | 2–3 | 2–8 | 4–11 |
| 1984–85 | Shamrock Rovers | R1 | (Northern Ireland) Linfield | 0–0 | 1–1 | 1–1 (a) |
| 1985–86 | Shamrock Rovers | R1 | (Hungary) Budapest Honvéd | 1–3 | 0–2 | 1–5 |
| 1986–87 | Shamrock Rovers | R1 | (Scotland) Celtic | 0–1 | 0–2 | 0–3 |
| 1987–88 | Shamrock Rovers | R1 | (Cyprus) Omonia | 0–1 | 0–0 | 0–1 |
| 1988–89 | Dundalk | R1 | (Socialist Federal Republic of Yugoslavia) Red Star Belgrade | 0–5 | 0–3 | 0–8 |
| 1989–90 | Derry City | R1 | (Portugal) Benfica | 1–2 | 0–4 | 1–6 |
| 1990–91 | St Patrick's Athletic | R1 | (Romania) Dinamo București | 1–1 | 0–4 | 1–5 |
| 1991–92 | Dundalk | R1 | (Hungary) Kispest Honvéd | 2–0 | 1–1 | 1–3 |
| 1992–93 | Shelbourne | PR | (Ukraine) Tavriya Simferopol | 0–0 | 1–2 | 1–2 |
| 1993–94 | Cork City | PR | (Turkey) Galatasaray | 0–1 | 1–2 | 1–3 |
| 1997–98 | Derry City | 1QR | (Slovenia) Maribor | 0–2 | 0–1 | 0–3 |
| 1998–99 | St Patrick's Athletic | 1QR | (Scotland) Celtic | 0–2 | 0–0 | 0–2 |
| 1999–00 | St Patrick's Athletic | 1QR | (Moldova) Zimbru Chișinău | 0–5 | 0–5 | 0–10 |
| 2000–01 | Shelbourne | 1QR | (North Macedonia) Sloga Jugomagnat | 1–1 | 1–0 | 2–1 |
| 2000–01 | Shelbourne | 2QR | (Norway) Rosenborg | 1–3 | 1–1 | 2–4 |
| 2001–02 | Bohemians | 1QR | (Estonia) Levadia Maardu | 3–0 | 0–0 | 3–0 |
| 2001–02 | Bohemians | 2QR | (Sweden) Halmstads BK | 1–2 | 0–2 | 1–4 |
| 2002–03 | Shelbourne | 1QR | (Malta) Hibernians | 0–1 | 2–2 | 2–3 |
| 2003–04 | Bohemians | 1QR | (Belarus) BATE Borisov | 3–0 | 0–1 | 3–1 |
| 2003–04 | Bohemians | 2QR | (Norway) Rosenborg | 0–1 | 0–4 | 0–5 |
| 2004–05 | Shelbourne | 1QR | (Iceland) KR | 0–0 | 2–2 | 2–2 (a) |
| 2004–05 | Shelbourne | 2QR | (Croatia) Hajduk Split | 2–0 | 2–3 | 4–3 |
| 2004–05 | Shelbourne | 3QR | (Spain) Deportivo La Coruña | 0–0 | 0–3 | 0–3 |
| 2005–06 | Shelbourne | 1QR | (Northern Ireland) Glentoran | 4–1 | 2–1 | 6–2 |
| 2005–06 | Shelbourne | 2QR | (Romania) Steaua București | 0–0 | 1–4 | 1–4 |
| 2006–07 | Cork City | 1QR | (Cyprus) Apollon Limassol | 1–0 | 1–1 | 2–1 |
| 2006–07 | Cork City | 2QR | (Serbia) Red Star Belgrade | 0–1 | 0–3 | 0–4 |
| 2007–08 | Derry City (Note: Second-placed Derry City were admitted to Champions League after the previous year's champions Shelbourne were denied a Premier Division license for 2007 due to financial violations.) | 1QR | (Armenia) Pyunik | 0–0 | 0–2 | 0–2 |
| 2008–09 | Drogheda United | 1QR | (Estonia) Levadia Tallinn | 2–1 | 1–0 | 3–1 |
| 2008–09 | Drogheda United | 2QR | (Ukraine) Dynamo Kyiv | 1–2 | 2–2 | 3–4 |
| 2009–10 | Bohemians | 2QR | (Austria) Red Bull Salzburg | 0–1 | 1–1 | 1–2 |
| 2010–11 | Bohemians | 2QR | (Wales) The New Saints | 1–0 | 0–4 | 1–4 |
| 2011–12 | Shamrock Rovers | 2QR | (Estonia) FC Flora Tallinn | 1–0 | 0–0 | 1–0 |
| 2011–12 | Shamrock Rovers | 3QR | (Denmark) F.C. Copenhagen | 0–1 | 0–2 | 0–3 |
| 2012–13 | Shamrock Rovers | 2QR | (Lithuania) FK Ekranas | 0–0 | 1–2 | 1–2 |
| 2013–14 | Sligo Rovers | 2QR | (Norway) Molde FK | 0–1 | 0–2 | 0–3 |
| 2014–15 | St Patrick's Athletic | 2QR | (Poland) Legia Warsaw | 0–5 | 1–1 | 1–6 |
| 2015–16 | Dundalk | 2QR | (Belarus) BATE Borisov | 0–0 | 1–2 | 1–2 |
| 2016–17 | Dundalk | 2QR | (Iceland) FH | 1–1 | 2–2 | 3–3 (a) |
| 2016–17 | Dundalk | 3QR | (Belarus) BATE Borisov | 3–0 | 0–1 | 3–1 |
| 2016–17 | Dundalk | PO | (Poland) Legia Warsaw | 0–2 | 1–1 | 1–3 |
| 2017–18 | Dundalk | 2QR | (Norway) Rosenborg BK | 1–1 | 1–2 | 2–3 (a.e.t.) |
| 2018–19 | Cork City | 1QR | (Poland) Legia Warsaw | 0–1 | 0–3 | 0–4 |
| 2019–20 | Dundalk | 1QR | (Latvia) Riga FC | 0–0 | 0–0 | 0–0 (5–4 (p)) |
| 2019–20 | Dundalk | 2QR | (Azerbaijan) Qarabag | 1–1 | 0–3 | 1–4 |
| 2020–21 | Dundalk | 1QR | (Slovenia) NK Celje | 0–3 (Note: Only one match was played at a neutral venue.) | | 0–3 |
| 2021–22 | Shamrock Rovers | 1QR | (Slovakia) Slovan Bratislava | 2–1 | 0–2 | 2–3 |
| 2022–23 | Shamrock Rovers | 1QR | (Malta) Hibernians | 3–0 | 0–0 | 3–0 |
| 2022–23 | Shamrock Rovers | 2QR | (Bulgaria) Ludogorets Razgrad | 0–3 | 2–1 | 2–4 |
| 2023–24 | Shamrock Rovers | 1QR | (Iceland) Breiðablik | 0–1 | 1–2 | 1–3 |
| 2024–25 | Shamrock Rovers | 1QR | (Iceland) Víkingur Reykjavík | 2–1 | 0–0 | 2–1 |
| 2024–25 | Shamrock Rovers | 2QR | (Czech Republic) Sparta Prague | 0–2 | 2–4 | 2–6 |
| 2025–26 | Shelbourne | 1QR | (Northern Ireland) Linfield | 1–0 | 1-1 | 2-1 |
| 2025–26 | Shelbourne | 2QR | (Azerbaijan) Qarabağ | 0-3 | 0-1 | 0-4 |
| 2026–27 | Shamrock Rovers | 1QR | (Malta) Floriana | | | |

PR = Preliminary round; R1/R2 = Round 1/2; 1QR/2QR/3QR = First/Second/Third qualifying round; PO = Playoff

=== UEFA Cup/Europa League ===
| Season | Club | Round | Opponent | Home | Away | Agg |
|---|---|---|---|---|---|---|
| 1971–72 | Shelbourne | R1 | (Hungary) Vasas | 1–1 | 0–1 | 1–2 |
| 1972–73 | Bohemians | R1 | (Germany) Köln | 0–3 | 1–2 | 1–5 |
| 1973–74 | Finn Harps | R1 | (Scotland) Aberdeen | 1–3 | 1–4 | 2–7 |
| 1974–75 | Bohemians | R1 | (Germany) Hamburg | 0–1 | 0–3 | 0–4 |
| 1975–76 | Athlone Town | R1 | (Norway) Vålerengen | 3–1 | 1–1 | 4–2 |
| 1975–76 | Athlone Town | R2 | (Italy) Milan | 0–0 | 0–3 | 0–3 |
| 1976–77 | Finn Harps | R1 | (England) Derby County | 1–4 | 0–12 | 1–16 |
| 1977–78 | Bohemians | R1 | (England) Newcastle United | 0–0 | 0–4 | 0–4 |
| 1978–79 | Finn Harps | R1 | (England) Everton | 0–5 | 0–5 | 0–10 |
| 1979–80 | Bohemians | R1 | (Portugal) Sporting CP | 0–0 | 0–2 | 0–2 |
| 1980–81 | Dundalk | R1 | (Portugal) Porto | 0–0 | 0–1 | 0–1 |
| 1981–82 | Limerick United | R1 | (England) Southampton | 0–3 | 1–1 | 1–4 |
| 1982–83 | Shamrcok Rovers | R1 | (Iceland) Fram | 4–0 | 3–0 | 7–0 |
| 1982–83 | Shamrcok Rovers | R2 | (Romania) Universitatea Craiova | 0–2 | 0–3 | 0–5 |
| 1983–84 | Drogheda United | R1 | (England) Tottenham | 0–6 | 0–8 | 0–14 |
| 1984–85 | Bohemians | R1 | (Scotland) Rangers | 3–2 | 0–2 | 3–4 |
| 1985–86 | Bohemians | R1 | (Scotland) Dundee United | 2–5 | 2–2 | 4–7 |
| 1986–87 | Galway United | R1 | (Netherlands) Groningen | 1–3 | 1–5 | 2–8 |
| 1987–88 | Bohemians | R1 | (Scotland) Aberdeen | 0–0 | 0–1 | 0–1 |
| 1988–89 | St Patrick's Athletic | R1 | (Scotland) Hearts | 0–2 | 0–2 | 0–4 |
| 1989–90 | Dundalk | R1 | (Switzerland) Wettingen | 0–2 | 0–3 | 0–5 |
| 1990–91 | Derry City | R1 | (Netherlands) Vitesse | 0–1 | 0–0 | 0–1 |
| 1991–92 | Cork City | R1 | (Germany) Bayern Munich | 1–1 | 0–2 | 1–3 |
| 1992–93 | Derry City | R1 | (Netherlands) Vitesse | 1–2 | 0–3 | 1–5 |
| 1993–94 | Bohemians | R1 | (France) Bordeaux | 0–1 | 0–5 | 0–6 |
| 1994–95 | Shamrock Rovers | PR | (Poland) Górnik Zabrze | 0–1 | 0–7 | 0–8 |
| 1994–95 | Cork City | PR | (Czech Republic) Slavia Prague | 0–4 | 0–2 | 0–6 |
| 1995–96 | Dundalk | PR | (Sweden) Malmö | 0–2 | 0–2 | 0–4 |
| 1995–96 | Shelbourne | PR | (Iceland) ÍA | 0–3 | 0–3 | 0–6 |
| 1996–97 | St Patricks Athletic | PR | (Slovakia) Slovan Bratislava | 3–4 | 0–1 | 3–5 |
| 1996–97 | Bohemians | PR | (Belarus) Dinamo Minsk | 1–1 | 0–0 | 1–1 (a) |
| 1997–98 | Bohemians | 1QR | (Hungary) Ferencváros | 0–1 | 0–5 | 0–6 |
| 1998–99 | Shelbourne | 1QR | (Scotland) Rangers | 3–5 | 0–2 | 3–7 |
| 1999–00 | Bray Wanderers | 1QR | (Switzerland) Grasshopper | 0–4 | 0–4 | 0–8 |
| 1999–00 | Cork City | 1QR | (Sweden) IFK Göteborg | 1–0 | 0–3 | 1–3 |
| 2000–01 | Cork City | 1QR | (Switzerland) Lausanne-Sport | 0–1 | 0–1 | 0–2 |
| 2000–01 | Bohemians | 1QR | (Scotland) Aberdeen | 0–1 | 2–1 | 2–2 (a) |
| 2000–01 | Bohemians | R1 | (Germany) 1. FC Kaiserslautern | 1–3 | 1–0 | 2–3 |
| 2001–02 | Shelbourne | 1QR | (Denmark) Brøndby | 0–3 | 0–2 | 0–5 |
| 2001–02 | Longford Town | 1QR | (Bulgaria) Litex Lovech | 1–1 | 0–2 | 2–3 |
| 2002–03 | Shamrock Rovers | 1QR | (Sweden) Djurgården | 1–3 | 0–2 | 1–5 |
| 2002–03 | Dundalk | 1QR | (Croatia) NK Varteks | 0–4 | 0–5 | 0–9 |
| 2003–04 | Shelbourne | 1QR | (Slovenia) Olimpija Ljubljana | 2–3 | 0–1 | 2–4 |
| 2003–04 | Derry City | 1QR | (Cyprus) APOEL | 0–3 | 1–2 | 1–5 |
| 2004–05 | Longford Town | 1QR | (Liechtenstein) Vaduz | 2–3 | 0–1 | 2–4 |
| 2004–05 | Bohemians | 1QR | (Estonia) Levadia Tallinn | 0–0 | 1–3 | 1–5 |
| 2004–05 | Shelbourne | R1 | (France) Lille | 2–2 | 0–2 | 2–4 |
| 2005–06 | Longford Town | 1QR | (Wales) Carmarthen Town | 2–0 | 1–5 | 3–5 |
| 2005–06 | Cork City | 1QR | (Lithuania) Ekranas | 0–1 | 2–0 | 2–1 |
| 2005–06 | Cork City | 2QR | (Sweden) Djurgården | 1–1 | 0–0 | 1–1 (a) |
| 2005–06 | Cork City | R1 | (Czech Republic) Slavia Prague | 0–2 | 1–2 | 1–4 |
| 2006–07 | Derry City | 1QR | (Sweden) IFK Göteborg | 1–0 | 1–0 | 2–0 |
| 2006–07 | Derry City | 2QR | (Scotland) Gretna | 0–1 | 2–0 | 2–1 |
| 2006–07 | Derry City | R1 | (France) PSG | 0–0 | 0–2 | 0–2 |
| 2006–07 | Drogheda United | 1QR | (Finland) HJK | 3–1 | 1–1 | 4–2 (a.e.t.) |
| 2006–07 | Drogheda United | 2QR | (Norway) Start | 1–0 | 0–1 | 1–1 (10–11 (p)) |
| 2007–08 | Drogheda United | 1QR | (San Marino) Libertas | 3–0 | 1–1 | 4–1 |
| 2007–08 | Drogheda United | 2QR | (Sweden) Helsingborgs IF | 1–1 | 0–3 | 1–4 |
| 2007–08 | St Patricks Athletic | 1QR | (Denmark) Odense | 0–0 | 0–5 | 0–5 |
| 2008–00 | St Patricks Athletic | 1QR | (Latvia) Olimps/ASK | 2–0 | 1–0 | 3–0 |
| 2008–00 | St Patricks Athletic | 2QR | (Sweden) IF Elfsborg | 2–1 | 2–2 | 4–3 |
| 2008–00 | St Patricks Athletic | R1 | (Germany) Hertha BSC | 0–0 | 0–2 | 0–2 |
| 2008–00 | Cork City | 1QR | (Finland) Haka | 2–2 | 0–4 | 2–6 |
| 2009–10 | Sligo Rovers | 1QR | (Albania) Vllaznia Shkodër | 1–2 | 1–1 | 1–3 |
| 2009–10 | Derry City | 2QR | (Latvia) Skonto | 1–0 | 1–1 | 2–1 |
| 2009–10 | Derry City | 3QR | (Bulgaria) CSKA Sofia | 1–1 | 0–1 | 1–2 |
| 2009–10 | St Patrick's Athletic | 2QR | (Malta) Valletta | 1–1 | 1–0 | 2–1 |
| 2009–10 | St Patrick's Athletic | 3QR | (Russia) Krylia Sovetov | 1–0 | 2–3 | 3–3 (a) |
| 2009–10 | St Patrick's Athletic | PO | (Romania) Steaua București | 1–2 | 0–3 | 1–5 |
| 2010–11 | Dundalk | 1QR | (Luxembourg) Grevenmacher | 2–1 | 3–3 | 5–4 |
| 2010–11 | Dundalk | 2QR | (Bulgaria) Levski Sofia | 0–2 | 0–6 | 0–8 |
| 2010–11 | Sporting Fingal | 2QR | (Portugal) Marítimo | 2–3 | 2–3 | 4–6 |
| 2010–11 | Shamrock Rovers | 2QR | (Israel) Bnei Yehuda | 1–1 | 1–0 | 2–1 |
| 2010–11 | Shamrock Rovers | 3QR | (Italy) Juventus | 0–2 | 0–1 | 0–3 |
| 2011–12 | St Patrick's Athletic | 1QR | (Iceland) ÍBV | 2–0 | 0–1 | 2–1 |
| 2011–12 | St Patrick's Athletic | 2QR | (Kazakhstan) Shakhter Karagandy | 2–0 | 1–2 | 3–2 |
| 2011–12 | St Patrick's Athletic | 3QR | (Ukraine) Karpaty Lviv | 1–3 | 0–2 | 1–5 |
| 2011–12 | Bohemians | 2QR | (Slovenia) Olimpija Ljubljana | 1–1 | 0–2 | 1–3 |
| 2011–12 | Sligo Rovers | 3QR | (Ukraine) Vorskla Poltava | 0–2 | 0–0 | 0–2 |
| 2011–12 | Shamrock Rovers | PO | (Serbia) Partizan | 1–1 | 2–1 | 3–2 (a.e.t.) |
| 2011–12 | Shamrock Rovers | Group A | (Russia) Rubin Kazan | 0–3 | 1–4 | 4th |
| 2011–12 | Shamrock Rovers | Group A | (England) Tottenham Hotspur | 0–4 | 1–3 | 4th |
| 2011–12 | Shamrock Rovers | Group A | (Greece) PAOK | 1–3 | 1–2 | 4th |
| 2012–13 | Bohemians | 1QR | (Iceland) Þór Akureyri | 0–0 | 1–5 | 1–5 |
| 2012–13 | St Patrick's Athletic | 1QR | (Iceland) ÍBV | 1–0 | 1–2 | 2–2 (a) (a.e.t.) |
| 2012–13 | St Patrick's Athletic | 2QR | (Bosnia and Herzegovina) Široki Brijeg | 2–1 | 1–1 | 3–2 (a.e.t.) |
| 2012–13 | St Patrick's Athletic | 3QR | (Germany) Hannover 96 | 0–3 | 0–2 | 0–5 |
| 2012–13 | Sligo Rovers | 2QR | (Slovakia) Spartak Trnava | 1–1 | 1–3 | 2–4 |
| 2013–14 | Drogheda United | 1QR | (Sweden) Malmö FF | 0–0 | 0–2 | 0–2 |
| 2013–14 | St Patrick's Athletic | 1QR | (Lithuania) Žalgiris Vilnius | 1–2 | 2–2 | 3–4 |
| 2013–14 | Derry City | 2QR | (Turkey) Trabzonspor | 0–3 | 2–4 | 2–7 |
| 2014–15 | Dundalk | 1QR | (Luxembourg) Jeunesse Esch | 3–1 | 2–0 | 5–1 |
| 2014–15 | Dundalk | 2QR | (Croatia) Hajduk Split | 0–2 | 2–1 | 2–3 |
| 2014–15 | Derry City | 1QR | (Wales) Aberystwyth Town | 4–0 | 5–0 | 9–0 |
| 2014–15 | Derry City | 2QR | (Belarus) Shakhtyor Soligorsk | 0–1 | 1–5 | 1–6 |
| 2014–15 | Sligo Rovers | 1QR | (Lithuania) Banga Gargždai | 4–0 | 0–0 | 4–0 |
| 2014–15 | Sligo Rovers | 2QR | (Norway) Rosenborg BK | 1–3 | 2–1 | 3–4 |
| 2015–16 | UCD | 1QR | (Luxembourg) F91 Dudelange | 1–0 | 1–2 | 2–2 (a) |
| 2015–16 | UCD | 2QR | (Slovakia) Slovan Bratislava | 1–5 | 0–1 | 1–6 |
| 2015–16 | Cork City | 1QR | (Iceland) KR | 1–1 | 1–2 | 2–3 (a.e.t.) |
| 2015–16 | St Patrick's Athletic | 1QR | (Latvia) Skonto | 0–2 | 1–2 | 1–4 |
| 2015–16 | Shamrock Rovers | 1QR | (Luxembourg) Progrès Niederkorn | 3–0 | 0–0 | 3–0 |
| 2015–16 | Shamrock Rovers | 2QR | (Norway) Odds BK | 0–2 | 1–2 | 1–4 |
| 2016–17 | Cork City | 1QR | (Northern Ireland) Linfield | 1–1 | 1–0 | 2–1 |
| 2016–17 | Cork City | 2QR | (Sweden) BK Häcken | 1–0 | 1–1 | 2–1 |
| 2016–17 | Cork City | 3QR | (Belgium) Genk | 1–2 | 0–1 | 1–3 |
| 2016–17 | Shamrock Rovers | 1QR | (Finland) RoPS | 0–2 | 1–1 | 1–3 |
| 2016–17 | St Patrick's Athletic | 1QR | (Luxembourg) Jeunesse Esch | 1–0 | 1–2 | 2–2 (a) |
| 2016–17 | St Patrick's Athletic | 2QR | (Belarus) Dinamo Minsk | 0–1 | 1–1 | 1–2 |
| 2016–17 | Dundalk | Group D | (Netherlands) AZ | 0–1 | 1–1 | 4th |
| 2016–17 | Dundalk | Group D | (Israel) Maccabi Tel Aviv | 1–0 | 1–2 | 4th |
| 2016–17 | Dundalk | Group D | (Russia) Zenit | 1–2 | 1–2 | 4th |
| 2017–18 | Cork City | 1QR | (Estonia) FCI Levadia Tallinn | 4–2 | 2–0 | 6–2 |
| 2017–18 | Cork City | 2QR | (Cyprus) AEK Larnaca | 0–1 | 0–1 | 0–2 |
| 2017–18 | Derry City | 1QR | (Denmark) Midtjylland | 1–4 | 1–6 | 2–10 |
| 2017–18 | Shamrock Rovers | 1QR | (Iceland) Stjarnan | 1–0 | 1–0 | 2–0 |
| 2017–18 | Shamrock Rovers | 2QR | (Czech Republic) Mladá Boleslav | 2–3 | 0–2 | 2–5 |
| 2018–19 | Dundalk | 1QR | (Estonia) FCI Levadia Tallinn | 2–1 | 1–0 | 3–1 |
| 2018–19 | Dundalk | 2QR | (Cyprus) AEK Larnaca | 0–0 | 0–4 | 0–4 |
| 2018–19 | Derry City | 1QR | (Belarus) Dinamo Minsk | 0–2 | 2–1 | 2–3 |
| 2018–19 | Cork City | 3QR | (Norway) Rosenborg BK | 0–2 | 0–3 | 0–5 |
| 2018–19 | Shamrock Rovers | 1QR | (Sweden) AIK | 0–1 | 1–1 | 1–2 (a.e.t.) |
| 2019–20 | Cork City | 1QR | (Luxembourg) Progrès Niederkorn | 0–2 | 2–1 | 2–3 |
| 2019–20 | Dundalk | 3QR | (Slovakia) Slovan Bratislava | 1–3 | 0–1 | 1–4 |
| 2019–20 | Shamrock Rovers | 1QR | (Norway) SK Brann | 2–1 | 2–2 | 4–3 |
| 2019–20 | Shamrock Rovers | 2QR | (Cyprus) Apollon Limassol | 2–1 | 1–3 | 3–4 (a.e.t.) |
| 2019–20 | St Patrick's Athletic | 1QR | (Sweden) IFK Norrköping | 0–2 | 1–2 | 1–4 |
| 2020–21 | Shamrock Rovers | 1QR | (Finland) Ilves | 2–2 | —N/a | 2–2 (12–11 (p)) |
| 2020–21 | Shamrock Rovers | 2QR | (Italy) A.C. Milan | 0–2 | —N/a | 0–2 |
| 2020–21 | Bohemians | 1QR | (Hungary) Fehérvár | —N/a | 1–1 | 1–1 (2–4 (p)) |
| 2020–21 | Derry City | 1QR | (Lithuania) FK Riteriai | —N/a | 2–3 | 2–3 (a.e.t.) |
| 2020–21 | Dundalk | 2QR | (Andorra) Inter Club d'Escaldes | —N/a | 1–0 | 1–0 |
| 2020–21 | Dundalk | 3QR | (Moldova) Sheriff Tiraspol | —N/a | 1–1 | 1–1 (3–5 (p)) |
| 2020–21 | Dundalk | PO | (Faroe Islands) KÍ | 3–1 | —N/a | 3–1 |
| 2020–21 | Dundalk | Group B | (Norway) Molde FK | 1–2 | 1–3 | 4th |
| 2020–21 | Dundalk | Group B | (England) Arsenal | 2–4 | 0–3 | 4th |
| 2020–21 | Dundalk | Group B | (Austria) Rapid Wien | 1–3 | 3–4 | 4th |
| 2022–23 | Shamrock Rovers | 3QR | (North Macedonia) Shkupi | 3–1 | 2–1 | 5–2 |
| 2022–23 | Shamrock Rovers | PO | (Hungary) Ferencvaros | 1–0 | 0–4 | 1–4 |
| 2024–25 | Shamrock Rovers | 3QR | (Slovenia) Celje | 3–1 (a.e.t) | 0–1 | 3–2 |
| 2024–25 | Shamrock Rovers | PO | (Greece) PAOK | 0–2 | 0–4 | 0–6 |
| 2025–26 | Shelbourne | 3QR | (Croatia) Rijeka | 1–3 | 2–1 | 3–4 |
| 2026–27 | Derry City | 1QR | (Bulgaria) CSKA Sofia | 1–2 | 2–3 | 3–5 |

PR = Preliminary round; R1/R2 = Round 1/2; 1QR/2QR/3QR = First/Second/Third qualifying round; PO = Playoff; Group = Group stage

=== UEFA Conference League ===
| Season | Club | Round | Opponent | Home | Away | Agg |
|---|---|---|---|---|---|---|
| 2021–22 | Bohemians | 1QR | (Iceland) Stjarnan | 3–0 | 1–1 | 4–1 |
| 2021–22 | Bohemians | 2QR | (Luxembourg) F91 Dudelange | 1–0 | 3–0 | 4–0 |
| 2021–22 | Bohemians | 3QR | (Greece) PAOK | 2–1 | 0–2 | 2–3 |
| 2021–22 | Dundalk | 1QR | (Wales) Newtown | 4–0 | 1–0 | 5–0 |
| 2021–22 | Dundalk | 2QR | (Estonia) FCI Levadia Tallinn | 2–2 | 2–1 | 4–3 |
| 2021–22 | Dundalk | 3QR | (Netherlands) Vitesse | 1–2 | 2–2 | 3–4 |
| 2021–22 | Sligo Rovers | 1QR | (Iceland) FH | 0–1 | 1–2 | 1–3 |
| 2021–22 | Shamrock Rovers | 3QR | (Albania) Teuta | 1–0 | 2–0 | 3–0 |
| 2021–22 | Shamrock Rovers | PO | (Estonia) FC Flora Tallinn | 0–1 | 2–4 | 2–5 |
| 2022–23 | Sligo Rovers | 1QR | (Wales) Bala Town | 2–1 | 0–1 | 2–2 (4–3 (p)) |
| 2022–23 | Sligo Rovers | 2QR | (Scotland) Motherwell | 1–0 | 2–0 | 3–0 |
| 2022–23 | Sligo Rovers | 3QR | (Norway) Viking | 1–5 | 1–0 | 2–5 |
| 2022–23 | Derry City | 1QR | (Latvia) Riga | 0–2 | 0–2 | 0–4 |
| 2022–23 | St Patrick's Athletic | 2QR | (Slovenia) Mura | 1–1 | 0–0 | 1–1 (6–5 (p)) |
| 2022–23 | St Patrick's Athletic | 3QR | (Bulgaria) CSKA Sofia | 1–0 | 0–2 | 1–2 |
| 2022–23 | Shamrock Rovers | Group F | (Sweden) Djurgården | 0–0 | 0–1 | 4th |
| 2022–23 | Shamrock Rovers | Group F | (Belgium) Gent | 1–1 | 0–3 | 4th |
| 2022–23 | Shamrock Rovers | Group F | (Norway) Molde | 0–2 | 0–3 | 4th |
| 2023–24 | Dundalk | 1QR | (Gibraltar) Bruno’s Magpies | 0–0 | 3–1 | 3–1 |
| 2023–24 | Dundalk | 2QR | (Iceland) KA | 2–2 | 1–3 | 3–5 |
| 2023–24 | Derry City | 1QR | (Faroe Islands) HB | 1–0 | 0–0 | 1–0 |
| 2023–24 | Derry City | 2QR | (Finland) KuPS | 2–1 | 3–3 | 5–4 |
| 2023–24 | Derry City | 3QR | (Kazakhstan) Tobol | 1–0 | 0–1 | 1–1 (5–6 (p)) |
| 2023–24 | St Patrick's Athletic | 1QR | (Luxembourg) F91 Dudelange | 1–2 | 2–3 | 3–5 |
| 2023–24 | Shamrock Rovers | 2QR | (Hungary) Ferencvaros | 0–2 | 0–4 | 0–6 |
| 2024–25 | Derry City | 1QR | (Gibraltar) Bruno's Magpies | 2−1 | 0–2 | 2−3 (a.e.t.) |
| 2024–25 | Shelbourne | 1QR | (Gibraltar) St Joseph's | 2–1 | 1–1 | 3–2 |
| 2024–25 | Shelbourne | 2QR | (Switzerland) Zürich | 0–0 | 0–3 | 0–3 |
| 2024–25 | St Patrick's Athletic | 2QR | (Liechtenstein) Vaduz | 3–1 | 2–2 | 5–3 |
| 2024–25 | St Patrick's Athletic | 3QR | (Azerbaijan) Sabah | 1–0 | 1–0 | 2–0 |
| 2024–25 | St Patrick's Athletic | PO | (Turkey) İstanbul Başakşehir | 0–0 | 0–2 | 0–2 |
| 2024–25 | Shamrock Rovers | League Phase | (Cyprus) APOEL | 1–1 | —N/a | 10th |
| 2024–25 | Shamrock Rovers | League Phase | (Northern Ireland) Larne | —N/a | 4–1 | 10th |
| 2024–25 | Shamrock Rovers | League Phase | (Wales) The New Saints | 2–1 | —N/a | 10th |
| 2024–25 | Shamrock Rovers | League Phase | (Austria) Rapid Vienna | —N/a | 1–1 | 10th |
| 2024–25 | Shamrock Rovers | League Phase | (Bosnia and Herzegovina) Borac Banja Luka | 3–0 | —N/a | 10th |
| 2024–25 | Shamrock Rovers | League Phase | (England) Chelsea | —N/a | 1–5 | 10th |
| 2024–25 | Shamrock Rovers | KPPO | (Norway) Molde | 0–1 (a.e.t) | 1–0 | 1–1 (4–5 (p)) |
| 2025–26 | St Patrick's Athletic | 1QR | (Lithuania) Hegelmann | 1–0 | 2–0 | 3–0 |
| 2025–26 | St Patrick's Athletic | 2QR | (Estonia) Nõmme Kalju | 1–0 | 2–2 (a.e.t) | 3–2 |
| 2025–26 | St Patrick's Athletic | 3QR | (Turkey) Beşiktaş J.K. | 1–4 | 2–3 | 3–7 |
| 2025–26 | Shamrock Rovers | 2QR (Note: Drogheda United had originally qualified for the 2QR through them winning the 2024 FAI Cup however due to them being owned by the Trivela Group who also own Danish side Silkeborg, Drogheda became the first team to ever be kicked out of a UEFA competition through multi-club ownership rules. Shamrock Rovers who had originally qualified for the 1QR were given Drogheda’s spot in the 2QR.) | (Gibraltar) St Joseph's | 0–0 | 4–0 | 4–0 |
| 2025–26 | Shamrock Rovers | 3QR | (Kosovo) Ballkani | 4–0 | 0–1 | 4–1 |
| 2025–26 | Shamrock Rovers | PO | (Portugal) Santa Clara | 0–0 | 2–1 | 2–1 |
| 2025–26 | Shamrock Rovers | League Phase | (Czech Republic) Sparta Prague | —N/a | 1–4 | 31st |
| 2025–26 | Shamrock Rovers | League Phase | (Slovenia) Celje | 0–2 | —N/a | 31st |
| 2025–26 | Shamrock Rovers | League Phase | (Greece) AEK Athens | —N/a | 1–1 | 31st |
| 2025–26 | Shamrock Rovers | League Phase | (Ukraine) Shakhtar Donetsk | 1–2 | —N/a | 31st |
| 2025–26 | Shamrock Rovers | League Phase | (Iceland) Breiðablik | —N/a | 1–3 | 31st |
| 2025–26 | Shamrock Rovers | League Phase | (Malta) Hamrun Spartans | 3–1 | —N/a | 31st |
| 2025–26 | Shelbourne | | | | | |
| 2025–26 | Shelbourne | PO | (Northern Ireland) Linfield | 3–1 | 2–0 | 5–1 |
| 2025–26 | Shelbourne | League Phase | (Sweden) Häcken | 0–0 | —N/a | 34th |
| 2025–26 | Shelbourne | League Phase | (North Macedonia) Shkëndija | —N/a | 0–1 | 34th |
| 2025–26 | Shelbourne | League Phase | (Kosovo) Drita | 0–1 | —N/a | 34th |
| 2025–26 | Shelbourne | League Phase | (Netherlands) AZ | —N/a | 0–2 | 34th |
| 2025–26 | Shelbourne | League Phase | (England) Crystal Palace | 0–3 | —N/a | 34th |
| 2025–26 | Shelbourne | League Phase | (Slovenia) Celje | —N/a | 0–0 | 34th |
| 2026–27 | Bohemians | 1QR | (Gibraltar) St Joseph's | | | |
| 2026–27 | Shelbourne | 2QR | (Estonia) Nõmme Kalju | 5–2 | 1–2 | 6–4 |
| 2026–27 | Shelbourne | 3QR | (Netherlands) Ajax | 2–2 | 1–3 | 3–5 |

1QR/2QR/3QR = First/Second/Third qualifying round; PO = Playoff; KPPO = Knockout Phase Play-off round

=== European/UEFA Cup Winners' Cup ===
| Season | Club | Round | Opponent | Home | Away | Agg |
|---|---|---|---|---|---|---|
| 1961–62 | St Patrick's Athletic | PR | (Scotland) Dunfermline Athletic | 0–4 | 1–4 | 1–8 |
| 1962–63 | Shamrock Rovers | R1 | (Bulgaria) Botev Plovdiv | 0–4 | 0–1 | 0–5 |
| 1963–64 | Shelbourne | R1 | (Spain) Barcelona | 0–2 | 1–3 | 1–5 |
| 1964–65 | Cork Celtic | R1 | (Bulgaria) Slavia Sofia | 0–2 | 1–1 | 1–3 |
| 1965–66 | Limerick | R1 | (Bulgaria) CSKA Cherveno Zname | 1–2 | 0–2 | 1–4 |
| 1966–67 | Shamrock Rovers | R1 | Spora Luxembourg | 4–1 | 4–1 | 8–2 |
| 1966–67 | Shamrock Rovers | R2 | (Germany) Bayern Munich | 1–1 | 2–3 | 3–4 |
| 1967–68 | Shamrock Rovers | R1 | (Wales) Cardiff City | 1–1 | 0–2 | 1–3 |
| 1968–69 | Shamrock Rovers | R1 | (Denmark) Randers | 1–2 | 0–1 | 1–3 |
| 1969–70 | Shamrock Rovers | R1 | (Germany) Schalke | 2–1 | 0–3 | 2–4 |
| 1970–71 | Bohemians | PR | (Czech Republic) TJ Gottwaldov | 1–2 | 2–2 | 3–4 |
| 1971–72 | Limerick | R1 | (Italy) Torino | 0–1 | 0–4 | 0–5 |
| 1972–73 | Cork Hibernians | R1 | (Cyprus) Pezoporikos Larnaca | 4–1 | 2–1 | 6–2 (Note: Both matches were played in Cork due to the dangerous political situation in Cyprus at the time.) |
| 1972–73 | Cork Hibernians | R2 | (Germany) Schalke | 0–0 | 0–3 | 0–3 |
| 1973–74 | Cork Hibernians | R1 | (Czech Republic) Baník Ostrava | 1–2 | 0–1 | 1–3 |
| 1974–75 | Finn Harps | R1 | (Turkey) Bursaspor | 0–0 | 2–4 | 2–4 |
| 1975–76 | Home Farm | R1 | (France) Lens | 1–1 | 0–6 | 1–7 |
| 1976–77 | Bohemians | R1 | (Denmark) Esbjerg | 2–1 | 1–0 | 3–1 |
| 1976–77 | Bohemians | R2 | (Poland) Śląsk Wrocław | 0–3 | 0–1 | 0–4 |
| 1977–78 | Dundalk | R1 | (Socialist Federal Republic of Yugoslavia) Hajduk Split | 1–0 | 0–4 | 1–4 |
| 1978–79 | Shamrock Rovers | R1 | (Cyprus) APOEL | 2–0 | 1–0 | 3–0 |
| 1978–79 | Shamrock Rovers | R2 | (Czech Republic) Baník Ostrava | 1–3 | 0–3 | 1–6 |
| 1979–80 | Watreford | R1 | (Sweden) Göteborg | 1–1 | 0–1 | 1–2 |
| 1980–81 | Watreford | R1 | (Malta) Hibernians | 4–0 | 0–1 | 4–1 |
| 1980–81 | Watreford | R2 | (Soviet Union) Dinamo Tbilisi | 0–1 | 0–4 | 0–5 |
| 1981–82 | Dundalk | R1 | (Iceland) Fram | 4–0 | 1–2 | 5–2 |
| 1981–82 | Dundalk | R2 | (England) Tottenham | 1–1 | 0–1 | 1–2 |
| 1982–83 | Limerick | R1 | (Netherlands) AZ | 1–1 | 0–1 | 1–2 |
| 1983–84 | Sligo Rovers | R1 | (Finland) Haka | 0–1 | 0–3 | 0–4 |
| 1984–85 | UCD | R1 | (England) Everton | 0–0 | 0–1 | 0–1 |
| 1985–86 | Galway United | R1 | (Denmark) Lyngby | 2–3 | 0–1 | 2–4 |
| 1986–87 | Waterford United | R1 | (France) Bordeaux | 1–2 | 0–4 | 1–6 |
| 1987–88 | Dundalk | R1 | (Netherlands) Ajax | 0–2 | 0–4 | 0–6 |
| 1988–89 | Derry City | R1 | (Wales) Cardiff City | 0–0 | 0–4 | 0–4 |
| 1989–90 | Cork City | R1 | (Soviet Union) Torpedo Moscow | 0–1 | 0–5 | 0–6 |
| 1990–91 | Bray Wanderers | QR | (Turkey) Trabzonspor | 1–1 | 0–2 | 1–3 |
| 1991–92 | Galway United | QR | (Denmark) Odense | 0–3 | 0–4 | 0–7 |
| 1992–93 | Bohemians | R1 | (Romania) Steaua București | 0–0 | 0–4 | 0–4 |
| 1993–94 | Shelbourne | QR | (Ukraine) Karpaty Lviv | 3–1 | 0–1 | 3–2 |
| 1993–94 | Shelbourne | R1 | (Greece) Panathinaikos | 1–2 | 0–3 | 1–5 |
| 1994–95 | Sligo Rovers | QR | (Malta) Floriana | 1–0 | 2–2 | 3–2 |
| 1994–95 | Sligo Rovers | R1 | (Belgium) Club Brugge | 1–2 | 1–3 | 2–5 |
| 1995–96 | Derry City | QR | (Bulgaria) Lokomotiv Sofia | 1–0 | 0–2 | 1–2 |
| 1996–97 | Shelbourne | QR | (Norway) Brann | 1–3 | 1–2 | 2–5 |
| 1997–98 | Shelbourne | QR | (Scotland) Kilmarnock | 1–1 | 1–2 | 2–3 |
| 1998–99 | Cork City | QR | (Ukraine) CSKA Kyiv | 2–1 | 0–2 | 2–3 |

PR = Preliminary round; R1/R2 = Round 1/2; QR = Qualifying round

=== Inter-Cities Fairs Cup ===
| Season | Club | Round | Opponent | Home | Away | Agg |
|---|---|---|---|---|---|---|
| 1962–63 | Drumcondra | R1 | (Denmark) Odense XI (Note: This was an 11 of players from the city of Odense, not to be confused with OB who are a club from Odense) | 4–1 | 2–4 | 6–5 |
| 1962–63 | Drumcondra | R2 | (Germany) Bayern Munich | 1–0 | 0–6 | 1–6 |
| 1963–64 | Shamrock Rovers | R1 | (Spain) Valencia | 0–1 | 2–2 | 2–3 |
| 1964–65 | Shelbourne | R1 | (Portugal) Belenenses | 0–0 | 1–1 | Play-off; 2–1 |
| 1964–65 | Shelbourne | R2 | (Spain) Atlético Madrid | 0–1 | 0–1 | 0–2 |
| 1965–66 | Shamrock Rovers | R2 | (Spain) Real Zaragoza | 1–1 | 1–2 | 2–3 |
| 1966–67 | Drumcondra | R1 | (Germany) Eintracht Frankfurt | 0–2 | 1–6 | 1–8 |
| 1967–68 | St Patrick's Athletic | R1 | (France) Bordeaux | 1–3 | 3–6 | 4–9 |
| 1968–69 | Dundalk | R1 | (Netherlands) DOS Utrecht | 2–1 | 1–1 | 3–2 (a.e.t.) |
| 1968–69 | Dundalk | R2 | (Scotland) Rangers | 0–3 | 1–6 | 1–9 |
| 1969–70 | Dundalk | R1 | (England) Liverpool | 0–4 | 0–10 | 0–14 |
| 1970–71 | Cork Hibernians | R1 | (Spain) Valencia | 0–3 | 1–3 | 1–6 |

R1/R2 = Round 1/2

== See also ==
- List of association football competitions
- List of foreign League of Ireland players
