= Olympia F.C. (Dublin) =

Former Association Football club in Ireland

Olympia
- Full name: Olympia Football Club
- Ground: Bellevue Lodge; Grand Canal; Inchicore; Dublin
- League: League of Ireland; Leinster Senior League

Olympia Football Club was an Irish association football club, originally based in The Coombe, Dublin. In 1917–18 Olympia won a Leinster cup double, winning both the Leinster Junior Cup and Leinster Senior Cup in the same season. In 1921–22 they were also founder members of the League of Ireland.

== History ==
=== Leinster Double ===
In 1917–18, with team that included Jack McCarthy and Fran Watters, Olympia won both the Leinster Junior Cup and Leinster Senior Cup. In doing so they caused one of the biggest upsets in the history of Leinster football. After winning the Leinster Junior Cup they qualified for the Leinster Senior Cup. After receiving a bye in the first round, Olympia beat St James's Gate in the semi-final. In the final they faced Shelbourne. After Leinster Nomads, Shelbourne and Bohemians, Olympia became only the fourth team to win the Leinster Senior Cup. Up until now, Shelbourne and Bohemians had monopolised the competition between them, so it was something of surprise result when Olympia, with a goal scored by Fran Watters, defeated Shelbourne 1–0 in the final. According to Peter Byrne this also resulted in a popular giant killing chat – "Remember Olympia once beat Shels". In 1917–18 Olympia also reached the IFA Junior Cup final but lost to Raglan.

=== Jacobs incident ===
During the 1919–20 season, played against the background of the Irish War of Independence, Olympia were involved in controversial incident with Jacobs. After a Leinster Senior Cup game, a group of Jacobs players were found guilty of invading the Olympia dressing room. Two Jacobs players received lengthy suspensions from the Leinster Football Association as did an Olympia player when it emerged that Jacobs had been taunted for "playing (British Army) soldiers" in their team.

=== League of Ireland ===
In 1921–22, together with Shelbourne, Bohemians, St James's Gate, Jacobs, Frankfort, YMCA and Dublin United, Olympia became founder members of the League of Ireland. Like Olympia, the other seven founding members had spent the 1920–21 season playing in the Leinster Senior League. Olympia, however, spent just two seasons, 1921–22 and 1922–23 in the league. They finished in 4th and 11th place respectively. Olympia also competed in both the 1921–22 and 1922–23 FAI Cups. On both occasions they were knocked out in the first round.

== Honours ==
- Leinster Senior Cup
  - Winners (1): 1917–18
- Leinster Junior Cup
  - Winners (1): 1917–18:
- IFA Junior Cup
  - Runners-up (1): 1917–18:

== Home ground ==
While playing in the League of Ireland, Olympia played their home games at Belluvue Lodge, near the Grand Canal at Inchicore. This had been the original home ground of St James's Gate.

== League of Ireland Stats ==
Stat	Opponent	Score	Competition	Date
Record Win	YMCA; Dublin United	4–1; 3–0	League of Ireland Shield; 1921–22 League of Ireland	27 December 1921; 19 November 1921
Record Defeat	Bohemians	0–8	1922–23 League of Ireland	18 November 1922

== Notable former players ==
=== Ireland internationals ===
These former Olympia F.C. players represented Ireland and/or the Republic of Ireland at full international level.

- (Ireland) (Republic of Ireland) Jack McCarthy
- (Republic of Ireland) Joe Grace
- (Republic of Ireland) Fran Watters
