= Rathmines Athletic F.C. =

Association football club in Ireland

Rathmines Athletic
- Full name: Rathmines Athletic Football Club
- Ground: Rathmines Park; Rathmines; Dublin
- League: League of Ireland

Rathmines Athletic Football Club were an Irish association football club based in Rathmines, Dublin. Together with YMCA, Frankfort and Reds United, Rathmines Athletic are one of only four clubs to have played just one season in the top level of the League of Ireland. The 1922–23 season saw Rathmines Athletic finish in 12th and last place and withdraw from the league without playing their last game.

== History ==
=== League of Ireland ===
The 1922–23 season saw the League of Ireland expand from eight to twelve teams. After Frankfort and YMCA dropped out, Rathmines Athletic became one of six new teams to join the league. The others were Shamrock Rovers, Shelbourne United, Pioneers, Athlone Town and Midland Athletic. Rathmines Athletic and Shelbourne United originally had their applications to join the league rejected at a meeting on 17 August 1922. They were only reconsidered after one of the original proposed expansion teams, University College Dublin, dropped out after concerns about their ability to field a team throughout the season. In their final league game Rathmines Athletic were due to play Dublin United. However they resigned from the league without playing the match. The match was later awarded as a win for Dublin United. In the 1922–23 FAI Cup Rathmines Athletic were drawn in the first round against Fordsons but the latter team were awarded a walkover.

== League of Ireland Stats ==
Stat	Opponent	Score	Date
Record Win	Athlone Town	2–0	7 October 1922
Record Defeat	St. James's Gate; Shelbourne	1–7; 0–6	18 November 1921; 21 October 1921

== Top Scorers ==
Name	Goals	Season
Michael Merrigan	3	1922–23 League of Ireland
Bex	3	1922–23 League of Ireland
