= Jacobs F.C. =

Jacobs
- Full name: Jacobs Football Club
- Nickname: The Red Necks
- Ground: Rutland Avenue; Crumlin, Dublin
- League: League of Ireland; Leinster Senior League

Jacobs Football Club was an Irish association football club based in Crumlin, Dublin. Jacobs were one of the founding members of the League of Ireland and played in the league from 1921–22 until 1931–32.

Like several fellow early League of Ireland clubs, such as St James's Gate, Midland Athletic, Fordsons and Dundalk, Jacobs had their origins as a factory or works team. They were originally the football team of Jacobs Biscuit Factory. In total, they lasted eleven seasons in the League of Ireland. They remained active as a football club until at least the late 1960s, playing in the round of sixteen of the 1968–69 FAI Cup.

== History ==
=== Early years ===
In 1914–15 Jacobs played in the Leinster Junior League alongside Shamrock Rovers and in 1916–17 they were runners up in the IFA Junior Cup, losing in the final to a team representing the Royal Irish Rifles. During the 1919–20 season, played against the background of the Irish War of Independence, a group of Jacobs players were found guilty of invading the dressing room of their opponents, Olympia, after a Leinster Senior Cup game. Two Jacobs players received lengthy suspensions from the Leinster Football Association as did an Olympia player when it emerged that Jacobs had been taunted for "playing (British Army) soldiers" in their team.

=== League of Ireland ===
Chart of yearly table positions for Jacobs in League of Ireland

In 1921–22, together with Shelbourne, Bohemians, St James's Gate, Frankfort, Olympia, YMCA and Dublin United, Jacobs became founder members of the League of Ireland. Like Jacobs, the other seven founding members had spent the 1920–21 season playing in the Leinster Senior League. In the 1921–22 Leinster Senior Cup Jacobs were finalists, losing 1–0 to eventual treble winners, St James's Gate. The highlight of their time in the League of Ireland was a third-place finish in 1923–24. They were also FAI Cup semi-finalists in 1922–23 and 1925–26. After finishing bottom of the table three consecutive seasons, Jacobs failed to gain re-election at the end of the 1931–32. Together with Brideville they left the league which was reduced from twelve to ten clubs.

=== Leinster Senior League ===
After leaving the League of Ireland, Jacobs rejoined the Leinster Senior League. During the 1950s they enjoyed something of a revival. In 1949–50 they won the FAI Intermediate Cup after beating St Patrick's Athletic in the final. They were also runners up in this cup competition in 1952–53, 1953–54 and 1960–61. Between 1952–53 and 1954–55 they were Leinster Senior League champions on three consecutive seasons. In 1967–68 they won a fourth Leinster Senior League title.

== Honours ==
- Leinster Senior League
  - Winners: 1952–53, 1953–54, 1954–55, 1967–68: 4
- FAI Intermediate Cup
  - Winners: 1949–50: 1
  - Runners-up: 1952–53, 1953–54, 1960–61: 3
- Leinster Senior Cup
  - Runners Up: 1921–22: 1

== League of Ireland Stats ==
Stat	Opponent	Score	Date
Biggest League Win	Midland Athletic	8–0	17 February 1923
Biggest League Defeat	Shelbourne	1–9	19 October 1929

== Notable former players ==
=== Ireland internationals ===
The following Jacobs F.C. players represented Ireland and/or the Republic of Ireland at full international level.

- (Republic of Ireland) (Ireland) Frank Collins
- (Republic of Ireland) Tommy Dunne
- (Republic of Ireland) Shay Keogh

=== Goalscorers ===
- Top League Scorer (season): 13, Paddy Smith (1922–23).
- Top League Scorer (total): 55, Paddy Smith (1921–23 and 1924–29).
