= Frankfort F.C. =

Frankfort
- Full name: Frankfort Football Club
- Founded: 1900
- Ground: Saint Anne's Park; Raheny; Dublin 5
- Chairman: David O'Connor
- League: League of Ireland; Leinster Senior League; Athletic Union League; United Churches Football League; North Dublin Schoolboys/Girls League; Amateur Football League
Home colours	Away colours

Frankfort Football Club is an Irish association football club based in Raheny, Dublin. In the 1921–22 League of Ireland, they were founding members of the League of Ireland. Today they still remain an active junior club fielding teams in various local Dublin leagues such as the Athletic Union League, the United Churches Football League, the Amateur Football League, and the North Dublin Schoolboys/Girls League. The club has been managed by the O'Connor family since it was formed in 1900. Current chairman, David O'Connor, took control of the club in 1999.

== History ==
=== Early years ===
Frankfort F.C. was formed in 1900 in the Frankfort Place/Frankfort Cottages district of Dublin, off Amiens Street and near Connolly Station. The district in turn was named after Baron Frankfort. In 1915–16 Frankfort were IFA Intermediate Cup runners up, losing in the final to the reserve team of Glentoran.

=== League of Ireland ===
In 1921–22, together with Shelbourne, Bohemians, St James's Gate, Jacobs, Olympia, YMCA and Dublin United, Frankfort became founder members of the League of Ireland. Like Frankfort, the other seven founding members had spent the 1920–21 season playing in the Leinster Senior League. During the inaugural League of Ireland season Frankfort played their home games at Richmond Road in Drumcondra. During the season Dublin United defeated Frankfort 6–0 and thus achieved the league's biggest home win. Frankfort also drew 4–4 with YMCA in the highest scoring game of the season. They eventually finished the season in sixth place. In the 1921–22 FAI Cup Frankfort lost 8–1 to Dublin United in the first round. Along with YMCA, Frankfort subsequently withdrew from the league after just one season. Together with YMCA, Rathmines Athletic and Reds United, Frankfort are one of only four clubs to have played just one season in the top level of the League of Ireland.

== League of Ireland Stats ==
Stat	Opponent	Score	Competition	Date
Record Win	Dublin United	5–0	League of Ireland	24 September 1921
Record Defeat	Dublin United	1–8	FAI Cup	14 January 1922
League Victory	Dublin United	5–0	League of Ireland	24 September 1921
Record Defeat	Dublin United	0–6	League of Ireland	12 November 1921

== Notable former players ==
=== Ireland internationals ===
Two former Frankfort F.C. players represented Ireland and/or the Republic of Ireland at full international level.

- (Ireland) Patrick O'Connell
- (Republic of Ireland) (Ireland) Tom Davis
