= YMCA F.C. (Dublin) =

YMCA
- Full name: YMCA Football Club
- Founded: 1893
- Ground: YMCA Sports Grounds; Claremont Road; Sandymount; Dublin; Ireland
- League: Leinster Senior League; League of Ireland

YMCA Football Club was an Irish association football club based in Sandymount, Dublin. The club was founded in 1893 and, together with the YMCA Cricket Club and the YMCA Hockey Club, it was part of the YMCA group of sports clubs based at Claremount Road, Sandymount. Today this group also includes Mount Merrion YMCA F.C. who play in the Leinster Senior League.

In 2023, the YMCA grounds at Claremount Road were sold to Landsdowne F.C., a rugby union club.

== History ==
=== League of Ireland ===
In 1921–22, together with Shelbourne, Bohemians, St James's Gate, Jacobs, Olympia, Dublin United and Frankfort, YMCA were founder members of the League of Ireland. Like the other seven founding members, YMCA had spent the 1920–21 season playing in the Leinster Senior League. During the season they lost 5–0 at home to Bohemians, giving the latter the biggest away win of season. They also drew 4–4 with Frankfort in the highest scoring game of the season. YMCA eventually finished in 8th and last place after failing to win a single game. Along with Frankfort, YMCA subsequently withdrew from the league after just one season. In the 1921–22 FAI Cup YMCA lost 4–3 at home to Athlone Town in the first round. Together with Frankfort, Rathmines Athletic and Reds United, YMCA are one of only four clubs to have played just one season in the top level of the League of Ireland.

== League of Ireland stats ==
Stat	Opponent	Score	Competition	Date
Record Win	Frankfort	3–1	League of Ireland Shield	25 March 1922
Record Defeat	Bohemians	0–5	League of Ireland	17 September 1921
