= Whitehall, Dublin =

Northern suburb of Dublin, Ireland

Whitehall Fionnbhrú (Irish)
- Suburb
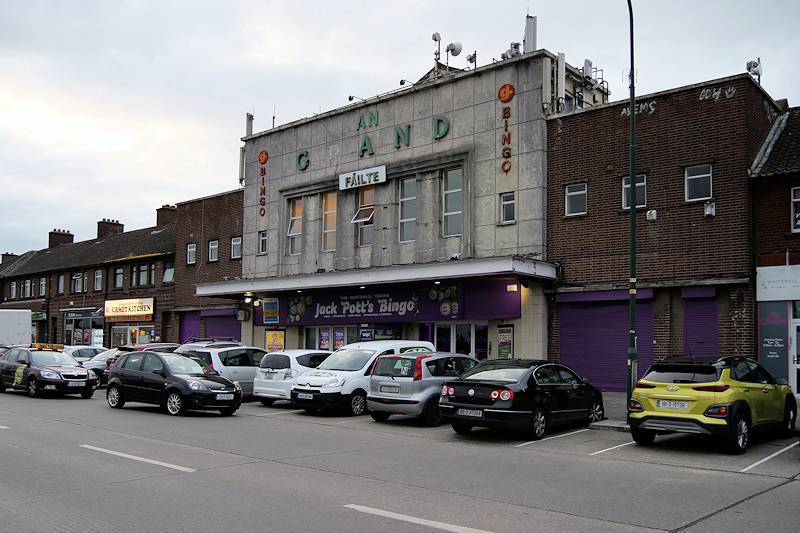
- Whitehall Grand, formerly a cinema

- Location in Dublin
- Coordinates: 53°23′12″N 6°14′54″W
- Country: Ireland
- Province: Leinster
- County: County Dublin
- Local authority: Dublin City Council
- Elevation: 3 m (9.8 ft)

Population (2016)
  - Total: 13,023
- Time zone: UTC+0 (GMT)
  - Summer (DST): UTC-1 (BST (GMT))
- Eircode routing key: D09
- Irish Grid Reference: O166388

Whitehall (Irish: Fionnbhrú) is a suburb on the northside of Dublin, Ireland.

Whitehall is a residential area on the northern outskirts of Dublin's inner city, located near the M1 motorway leading to Dublin Airport, Swords and Belfast. It is situated between the suburbs of Santry, Drumcondra and Glasnevin. North of Whitehall, the M1 motorway begins at its junction with the M50, past the Dublin Port Tunnel's northern entrance. The area is adjacent to Beaumont Hospital and to Dublin City University on Collins Avenue.

== Etymology ==
Whitehall takes its name from a house named White Hall, formerly located to the south of the village on Drumcondra Road Upper. The area commonly known as Whitehall Cross, at the intersection of Swords Road (R132) (north-south) and Collins Avenue (east-west), is in the townland of Clonturk. It was formerly the site of a public house called "The Thatch", the memory of which is preserved in the name of a nearby road.

== Education ==
Whitehall College of Further Education is situated on the old site of Whitehall House. Whitehall College was established in 1970 as Whitehall House Secretarial School and later changed its name to reflect its wider range of courses. The college has since moved to Mobhi Road from its former Swords Road building.

Also in the area are Plunket College of Further Education and St. Aidan's Christian Brothers School, whose past pupils include former Taoiseach Bertie Ahern and international footballer Liam Brady. The Holy Child Girls' National School and the Holy Child Boys' National School, both designed by Robinson and Keefe Architects, are also in Whitehall. Margaret Aylward School is a girls' secondary school beside Ellenfield Park and Whitehall church.

== Churches ==
The Roman Catholic Church of the Holy Child, often called Whitehall Church, serves the parish of Whitehall-Larkhill-Santry. It is a large redbrick church designed by John Robinson of Robinson Keefe and Devane Architects, visible from the N1. The design is similar in several respects to Galway Cathedral, designed by the same architect. Before the church's opening, the area was served by a temporary church in Larkhill known locally as the "Tin Church".

== Sport ==
National sporting interests are represented by Whitehall Colmcille GAA club, whose former players include All-Ireland medal winners Tommy Drumm, Paul Clarke, Paddy Moran and Declan McGrath. The club is the largest juvenile sporting body in the area, providing Gaelic football, ladies' football, hurling and camogie to boys and girls from age four upward. The area also houses the home ground of junior football club Home Farm F.C., and St. Kevin's Boys F.C., the schoolboy club for which Liam Brady, Ian Harte, Stephen Carr and Damien Duff played. Whitehall is also the site of one of the interchanges for the Dublin Port Tunnel with the M1. The Dubliners musician Luke Kelly also lived in Whitehall, and there is a commemorative stone in the area dedicated to him.

Whitehall Colmcille's clubhouse on Collins Avenue was formerly a tennis club (Thorndale). The club uses Ellenfield Park for its games and has developed new pitches at Whitehall Cross on land that was once a farm, later used during construction of the Port Tunnel.

Whitehall Rangers A.F.C. are a soccer club in the area, with a ladies' team playing at intermediate level. Whitehall Celtic is a football club competing in the Athletic Union League.

Dublin Archers practice at Plunket College grounds in Whitehall.

Whitehall Stadium is located in Whitehall, bordering Drumcondra, and is home to the club Home Farm.

== People ==
- Luke Kelly, a member of The Dubliners, lived in Whitehall during his childhood. In September 1988, a monument was erected to commemorate Kelly in the Larkhill area of Whitehall.

== History ==
=== Civil War ===
In the aftermath of the killing of Michael Collins on 25 August 1922, retaliatory killings occurred in Whitehall. Two Anti-Treaty Republicans, Alfie (Leo) Colley (20) and Sean Cole (18), members of Fianna Éireann, were abducted by Free State forces at the North Strand. Witnesses saw them being shot dead at The Thatch, Puck's Lane or Yellow Lane (now Yellow Road), in Whitehall. There is a small commemoration stone on Yellow Road to Cole and Colley. It was unveiled in December 1926 by Countess Markiewicz in front of a crowd of 800.

Another Civil War-era site in Whitehall is the memorial stone to Martin Hogan on Grace Park Road, whose body was found dumped there on 22 August 1923.

=== Whitehall Grand Cinema ===
The Whitehall Grand Cinema opened in July 1954 on Collins Avenue and seated 1,000 patrons. It also hosted bingo while still operating as a cinema, and ceased functioning as a cinema in 1974, when it was purchased by Gael Linn and operated solely as a bingo hall. It still serves as a bingo hall to this day.

== See also ==
- List of towns in the Republic of Ireland
