= List of Shamrock Rovers F.C. records and statistics =

Shamrock Rovers Football Club are a football club from Dublin, Ireland. They compete in the League of Ireland and are the most successful club in the history of football in the Republic of Ireland, having won 21 League of Ireland titles and 25 FAI Cups.

They have also won the League of Ireland Shield on 18 occasions and the League of Ireland Cup once. Shamrock Rovers have supplied more players to the Republic of Ireland national football team (64) than any other single club. This list comprises the major honours won by Shamrock Rovers and the records set by the players and managers of the club.

== Honours ==
=== National titles ===
- (Republic of Ireland) League of Ireland: 22 (record)
  - 1922–23, 1924–25, 1926–27, 1931–32, 1937–38, 1938–39, 1953–54, 1956–57, 1958–59, 1963–64
    1983–84, 1984–85, 1985–86, 1986–87, 1993–94, 2010, 2011, 2020, 2021, 2022
    2023, 2025
- FAI Cup: 26 (record)
  - 1925, 1929, 1930, 1931, 1932, 1933, 1936, 1940, 1944, 1945, 1948, 1955, 1956, 1962, 1964, 1965, 1966, 1967,
    1968, 1969, 1978, 1985, 1986, 1987, 2019, 2025
- League of Ireland Shield: 18
  - 1924–25, 1926–27, 1931–32, 1932–33, 1934–35, 1937–38, 1941–42, 1949–50, 1951–52, 1954–55, 1955–56,
    1956–57, 1957–58, 1962–63, 1963–64, 1964–65, 1965–66, 1967–68.
- League of Ireland Cup: 2
  - 1976–77
  - 2013
- League of Ireland First Division: 1
  - 2006
- Setanta Sports Cup: 2
  - 2011 Setanta Sports Cup
  - 2013 Setanta Sports Cup

=== Regional titles ===
- Leinster Senior Cup: 18
  - 1923, 1927, 1929, 1930, 1933, 1938, 1953, 1955, 1956, 1957, 1958, 1964, 1969, 1982, 1985, 1997, 2012, 2013

Complete list of honours

== European record ==
Shamrock Rovers have a long history in European competition. They were the first League of Ireland side to enter European competition, and featured regularly in the 1960s and 1980s. The club has had some relative success with victories in the Intertoto-Cup and the Europa League. Throughout their participation Rovers have beaten teams from Luxembourg, Cyprus, Iceland and Germany, and were the first Irish club to beat teams from Turkey, Poland, Israel, Serbia Slovakia, Albania and Hungary. Their first victory in the UEFA Champions League came in a 1–0 victory in the 2011–12 qualifying phase against FC Flora Tallinn at Tallaght Stadium .

Their biggest win was a 7–0 aggregate victory (3–0 away, 4–0 home) over Fram Reykjavik in the UEFA Cup first round in September 1982, which remains a record for League of Ireland clubs in European competition.

On 25 August 2011, they became the first Irish team to qualify for the UEFA Europa League group stage when they defeated Partizan Belgrade 2–1 after extra-time in Serbia, for a 3–2 aggregate victory.

Rovers qualified for the group stages of the 2022–23 UEFA Europa Conference League The Hoops finished bottom of their group with 2 points.

In the 2024–25 UEFA Europa Conference League Shamrock Rovers became the first League of Ireland side to qualify for the knockout stages of a UEFA club competition. With the 4-1 league stage win over Larne F.C., they also became the first League of Ireland side across five campaigns (three for Rovers and two for Dundalk) to win away from home in a UEFA group stage/league stage match.

In 2025, Rovers qualified for the UEFA Conference League for the second year in a row after a historic victory vs Santa Clara. The Hoops were knocked out in the league phase, finishing 32nd.

Some of their more notable European performances include:

- a 2–2 draw and 1–0 defeat to defending champions and finalists, Valencia CF in Inter-Cities Fairs Cup 1963–64
- a 1–1 draw and 2–1 defeat to finalists, Real Zaragoza in the Inter-Cities Fairs Cup 1965–66
- a 1–1 draw and 3–2 defeat to winners, Bayern Munich in the UEFA Cup Winners' Cup 1966–67
- a 2–1 win over FC Schalke 04 in the UEFA Cup Winners' Cup 1969–70
- a 2–1 win and 1–0 win over Odra Wodzisław in the UEFA Intertoto Cup 2003
- a 1-0 win over Bnei Yehuda in Tel Aviv in the 2010–11 UEFA Europa League.
- a 2-1 win over Partizan Belgrade in Belgrade in the 2011–12 UEFA Europa League play-off round to make history by becoming the first Irish team to qualify for the UEFA Europa League group stage.

=== Overview ===
Correct as of December 2024

Competition	P	W	D	L	GF	GA
European Cup / UEFA Champions League	32	5	8	19	21	50
Inter-Cities Fairs Cup / UEFA Cup / UEFA Europa League	50	13	9	28	49	88
UEFA Europa Conference League / UEFA Conference League	18	5	4	9	18	30
European Cup Winners' Cup / UEFA Cup Winners Cup	16	5	2	9	19	27
UEFA Intertoto Cup	6	3	0	3	7	10
TOTAL	122	31	23	68	114	205

== Exhibition games ==
=== Notable results ===
- 5–1 win against Red Star Belgrade, 16/7/1961, Polo Grounds, New York (Scorers: Tony Byrne (2), Frank O'Neill, Paddy Ambrose, Liam Tuohy).
- 1–0 win against Sporting Clube de Portugal, 16/8/1985, Estádio José Alvalade (1956) (Scorer: Harry Kenny)
- 1–0 win against Arsenal, 25/2/1986, Glenmalure Park (Scorer: Noel Larkin).
- 2–0 win against Manchester United, 14/8/1986, Shay Brennan testimonial, Glenmalure Park (Scorers: Michael Bennett (footballer), Liam O'Brien).

== Team records ==
Games
- 100th League Game: Shamrock Rovers 3–1 Athlone (24/9/1927)
- 500th League Game: Shamrock Rovers 2–0 Shelbourne (21/4/1948)
- 1000th League Game: Dundalk 1–0 Shamrock Rovers (20/2/1971)
- 1500th League Game: Shamrock Rovers 2–0 Athlone (22/1/1989)
- 1600th League Game: Shamrock Rovers 0–0 Waterford (24/1/1993)
- 1700th League Game: Galway 0–2 Shamrock Rovers (2/3/1996)
- 2000th League Game: Shamrock Rovers 1–2 Drogheda (22/10/2004)
- 2500th League Game: Shamrock Rovers 0-1 Dundalk (28/06/2019)

Results
- Largest victory:
  Shamrock Rovers 11–0 Bray Unknowns (28/10/1928)
- Largest defeat:
  St James's Gate 7–0 Shamrock Rovers (22/4/1937)
  Cork City 7–0 Shamrock Rovers (31/8/1938)
  Górnik Zabrze 7–0 Shamrock Rovers (1994–95)

- The club's 1000th League win came on Friday 18 August 2006 when Kilkenny City were beaten 2–0 at Tolka Park with goals by Anthony Flood and Tadhg Purcell.

At the end of the 2024 season the club's overall League record is:

Played:	Won:	Drew:	Lost:	GF:	GA:	Points:
2676	1331	652	693	4908	3117	3850

Padraig Amond scored Rovers 4000th League goal on 14 September 2007 in a 4–0 win over Galway United.

== Player statistics ==
=== Goalscorers ===
- Highest number of league goals in a season:
  - Bob Fullam – 1922–23 (27)
  - Gary Twigg – 2009 (24)
  - Stephen Geoghegan – 1993–94 (23)
- Top League scorers
  - Paddy Ambrose – 109
  - Paddy Coad – 104
  - Bob Fullam – 92
- Top FAI Cup scorers
  - Paddy Coad – 37
  - Liam Tuohy – 20

== Bibliography ==
- Rice, Eoghan (2005). We Are Rovers. Nonsuch. ISBN 1-84588-510-4.
- Paul Doolan, Robert Goggins (1993). The Hoops. Gill & Macmillan Ltd. ISBN 0-7171-2121-6.
