= Mick McCarthy (footballer, born 1911) =

Irish footballer

Personal information
- Full name: Michael Anthony McCarthy
- Date of birth: 22 December 1911
- Date of death: 21 May 1973 (aged 61)
- Position: Goalkeeper

Senior career*
Years	Team	Apps	(Gls)
- Cork Bohemians
19xx–1931	Fordsons		
1931–1934	Shamrock Rovers		
1934–1935	Sheffield United	9	(0)
1935–1936	Brideville		
1936–194x	Shamrock Rovers		

International career
1932	Ireland	1	(0)
1941	League of Ireland XI	1	(0)
- * Club domestic league appearances and goals

Mick McCarthy (22 December 1911 – 21 May 1973) was an Ireland international footballer who played as a goalkeeper. He spent the majority of his career playing in the League of Ireland for Shamrock Rovers, helping the club win three league titles and three FAI Cups.

== Playing career ==
=== Club career ===
McCarthy originally came from Blackrock, Cork and as a youth he played hurling as well as association football. He played for Cork Bohemians and Fordsons before signing for Shamrock Rovers on 6 November 1931. A number of Scottish clubs, as well as Birmingham City, made enquiries about signing him before he opted to join Rovers. In 1931–32 he was part of Rovers team that won the treble, winning the League of Ireland, the FAI Cup and the League of Ireland Shield. Other members of the team included Jimmy Daly, John Joe Flood, Paddy Moore, Owen Kinsella, David Byrne, John Burke and William Glen. After three years at Rovers, McCarthy joined Sheffield United. He was signed by United following an impressive performance in a 2–2 draw between Rovers and United in the Duggan Cup. He made his debut against Bradford City on 27 August 1934 in a 5–2 league win, making nine appearances in total and keeping two clean sheets. However a serious thigh injury forced him to return to Ireland. Despite been told he would never play again, McCarthy made a comeback and after a short spell at Brideville he rejoined Shamrock Rovers in 1936–37.

=== International career ===
==== Ireland ====
On 8 May 1932 McCarthy made his one and only appearance for Ireland in a 2–0 away win against the Netherlands at the Olympic Stadium.

==== League of Ireland XI ====
On 14 April 1941 McCarthy represented the League of Ireland XI against the Irish League XI at Windsor Park.

== Death ==
McCarthy died in his home in Clonskeagh in May 1973.

== Honours ==
Shamrock Rovers

- League of Ireland
  - 1931–32, 1937–38, 1938–39: 3
- FAI Cup
  - 1931–32, 1932–33, 1939–40: 3
- League of Ireland Shield
  - 1931–32, 1932–33, 1937–38: 3
- Leinster Senior Cup
  - 1932–33, 1937–38: 3
