= Cork Bohemians F.C. =

- Full name: Cork Bohemians Football Club
- Ground: Munster Agricultural Society; Greyhound Park; Turner's Cross
- League: League of Ireland; Munster Senior League

Cork Bohemians F.C. was an Irish association football club based in Cork. The club played in the League of Ireland for two seasons in 1932–33 and 1933–34. After Fordsons/Cork F.C., they became the second club from Cork city to join the league. Of the eight Cork city clubs to play in the league, Bohemians had the shortest stay. The club was successful at intermediate level both before and after its short spell in the League of Ireland, winning the Munster Senior League, the Munster Senior Cup and the FAI Intermediate Cup.

== History ==
=== Early years ===
Cork Bohemians F.C. were formed in the early 1900s. ^{(Note 1)} During the early 1920s they competed in the Munster Senior League, playing against, amongst others, Cobh Ramblers and Mallow United, as well as two clubs who shared their name with future League of Ireland clubs, Cork Celtic and Cork City. They also played in the Munster Senior Cup. They were finalists for the first time in 1925–26 but lost out to Fordsons. They subsequently went on to make three appearances in the final and won the cup in both 1926–27 and 1927–28. Cork Bohemians would go onto win the cup on four further occasions. In 1924–25 Cork Bohemians made their debut in the FAI Cup but lost 5–3 to the holders Athlone Town in the first round. Between 1927–28 and 1933–34, Cork Bohemians would make seven successive appearances in the FAI Cup. They were quarter finalists in 1928–29, 1930–31 and 1932–33. Cork Bohemians also competed in the FAI Intermediate Cup, winning the second ever competition in 1927–28. They were winners again in 1930–31. In subsequent seasons they were finalists on six occasions but never again winners. Between 1937–38 and 1940–41 they runners-up four times in a row.

=== League of Ireland ===
Cork Bohemians were elected to the League of Ireland in 1932–33 after Brideville and Jacobs failed to gain re-election and Waterford resigned from the league before the start of the season. After Cork F.C. (previously known as Fordsons) they became the second club from Cork city to join the league. Bohemians, following the example of Cork F.C., augmented local talent by importing players from Northern Ireland and England and their team included several former and future internationals. After an encouraging start to the 1932–33 season, which included 15,000 people watching a local derby against Cork F.C., they were forced to release eight professionals, and ended the season finishing fourth from the bottom. The 1933–34 season proved to be a lean one for all League of Ireland clubs and in particular Cork Bohemians. Travelling to fulfil away fixtures drained their meagre financial resources and receipts from their home games did not help. During the regular season their away game against Bray Unknowns was not played and the points were awarded to the Unknowns. Bohemians fell behind in their 5% of gate receipts payable to the league and found themselves suspended. Within a week the required amount was scraped together and the suspension lifted. However it proved only temporary relief and, after failing to raise the £15 which would have paid for them to travel to a League of Ireland Shield fixture with Dolphin at Harold's Cross Stadium on 28 April 1934, they resigned from the league on 22 April.‌

Season Placings

Season	Position
1932–33	7th
1933–34	10th

== Grounds ==
During its time in the League of Ireland, Cork Bohemians played their home games at three grounds. They initially played at the Munster Agricultural Society's showgrounds in Ballintemple, before moving to the Greyhound Park behind Páirc Uí Chaoimh. They also played at Turner's Cross.

== Notable former players ==
Ireland (FAI) internationals

On 25 February 1934, Miah Lynch became the only Cork Bohemians player to represent Ireland while playing for the club. Lynch played against Belgium in a 1934 FIFA World Cup qualifier at Dalymount Park.

- (Republic of Ireland) Bill Lacey
- (Republic of Ireland) Miah Lynch
- (Republic of Ireland) Mick McCarthy

Ireland (IFA) internationals

- (Ireland) Bill Lacey

== Honours ==
- Munster Senior League
  - Winners: 1930–31, 1937–38, 1940–41: 3
  - Runners Up: 1922–23, 1939–40, 1941–42, 1942–43: 4
- Munster Senior Cup
  - Winners: 1926–27, 1927–28, 1930–31, 1931–32, 1932–33, 1942–43: 6
  - Runners Up: 1925–26, 1929–30: 2
- FAI Intermediate Cup
  - Winners: 1927–28, 1930–31: 2
  - Runners Up: 1931–32, 1932–33, 1937–38, 1938–39, 1939–40, 1940–41: 6

== See also ==
- League of Ireland in Cork city

== Notes ==
- ^1 Cork Bohemians shared their name with a cricket club and a field hockey club, both of which co-existed with the football club. Cork Bohemians Cricket Club were based at the Mardyke. During the 1940s and 1950s one of their most notable players was Noel Cantwell. It is unclear if the three clubs were part of the same organisation.
