= Alf Rigby =

Irish footballer

Personal information
- Full name: Alfred Rigby
- Position: Forward

Senior career*
Years	Team	Apps	(Gls)
1931–1933	Bray Unknowns		
1933–1937	St James's Gate		
1937–1938	Dundalk		

International career
1934–1935	Ireland	3	(0)
- * Club domestic league appearances and goals

Alf Rigby was an Ireland international footballer. Rigby played for several clubs in the League of Ireland including Bray Unknowns, St James's Gate and Dundalk. He was also the top goalscorer in the League of Ireland for two successive seasons.

== Playing career ==
=== St James's Gate ===
In 1933–34 and 1934–35, while playing for St James's Gate, Rigby was the top scorer in the League of Ireland, scoring 13 and 17 goals respectively. On 17 March 1934 he also played for Gate in the FAI Cup final which Gate lost 2–1 to Cork. Rigby's goals helped Gate finish as runners–up in the 1934–35 League of Ireland season and then win the 1935–36 League of Ireland Shield.

=== International career ===
During the 1934–35 season Rigby played three times for Ireland. On 16 December 1934 he made his debut against Hungary in a 4–2 defeat at Dalymount Park. In May 1935 he was a member of an Ireland squad that went on a European tour. On 5 May he played in 1–0 against Switzerland. Then on 8 May he played in a 3–1 defeat against Germany. Rigby made all three of his international appearances while playing for St James's Gate.

== Honours ==
St James's Gate

- League of Ireland Shield
  - Winners: 1935–36
- League of Ireland
  - Runners Up: 1934–35
- FAI Cup
  - Runners Up: 1933–34

Individual

- League of Ireland Top Scorer:
  - 1933–34, 1934–35
