= 1936 in Ireland =

- Centuries: 18th; 19th; 20th; 21st
- Decades: 1910s; 1920s; 1930s; 1940s; 1950s
- See also: 1936 in Northern Ireland; Other events of 1936; List of years in Ireland

Events from the year 1936 in Ireland.

== Incumbents ==
- Governor-General: Domhnall Ua Buachalla (until 11 December)
- President of the Executive Council: Éamon de Valera (FF)
- Vice-President of the Executive Council: Seán T. O'Kelly (FF)
- Minister for Finance: Seán MacEntee (FF)
- Chief Justice:
  - Hugh Kennedy (until 1 December 1936)
  - Timothy Sullivan (from 1 December 1936)
- Dáil: 8th
- Seanad: 1934 Seanad (until 19 May 1936)

== Events ==
- 9 February – Brian de Valera, third son of Éamon de Valera, dies in a riding accident, aged 21.
- 5 March – five hundred delegates attend the Fine Gael Árd-Feis in Dublin. W. T. Cosgrave is once again nominated as its president.
- 4 April – a dispute between two unions over who makes coffins results in the coffin of an abandoned infant being turned away from Glasnevin Cemetery.
- 27 May – Aer Lingus makes its first flight. The five-seater plane, Iolar, travels from Baldonnel Aerodrome to Bristol.
- 28 May – the Dáil passes a motion abolishing the Senate of the Irish Free State.
- 20 June – the Irish Republican Army is (again) declared an illegal organisation by the government.
- 6 September – the new Roman Catholic Christ the King Cathedral, Mullingar, is dedicated. Granite from Barnacullia quarries in Dublin was used in its construction.
- 20 November – General Eoin O'Duffy leads six hundred men of his Irish Brigade to fight for Francisco Franco in the Spanish Civil War.
- December – first Irish socialist volunteers in the Spanish Civil War (including the Connolly Column) leave the Irish ports to fight for the Republican faction, initially on the Córdoba front.
- 11 December – the Oireachtas of the Irish Free State passes the Constitution (Amendment No. 27) Act 1936, removing most powers from the office of Governor-General of the Irish Free State with the intention of abolishing the post.
- 12 December – the Oireachtas's Executive Authority (External Relations) Act 1936 is signed into law, assenting to the abdication of Edward VIII of the United Kingdom (and passing of the throne to George VI) and restricting the power of the monarch in relation to Ireland to international affairs.

== Arts and literature ==
- Elizabeth Bowen publishes her novel The House in Paris.
- Austin Clarke publishes his second novel The Singing-Men at Cashel; like the first, it is prohibited in Ireland by the Censorship of Publications Board.
- Teresa Deevy's play Katie Roche premieres.
- James Joyce publishes his Collected Poems.
- Patrick Kavanagh publishes Ploughman, and Other Poems.
- Harry Kernoff paints In Davy's Parlour Snug: Self portrait with Davy Byrne and Martin Murphy.
- Cecil Day-Lewis publishes his poetry Noah and the Waters.
- Lord Longford founds the Longford Players.
- Louis MacNeice publishes his translation of The Agamemnon of Aeschylus.
- Seán Ó Faoláin publishes his novel Bird Alone; it is prohibited in Ireland by the Censorship of Publications Board.
- Peig Sayers publishes her autobiography Peig.
- George Shiels' plays The Passing Day and The Jailbird are first produced.
- W. B. Yeats delivers broadcast lectures on the BBC (continuing into 1937), makes recordings of his own verse and edits The Oxford Book of Modern Verse 1892-1935.
- Literary magazine Ireland Today, edited by Frank O'Connor, begins publication (June 1936 – March 1938).
- The Dawn is released; directed by Tom Cooper, it is the first sound film made in Ireland by an Irish company.

== Sport ==
=== Football ===
- League of Ireland
  Winners: Bohemians
  FAI Cup
  Winners: Shamrock Rovers 2–1 Cork

=== Golf ===
- Irish Open is won by Reg Whitcombe (England).

== Births ==
- 6 January – Syd Cheatle, playwright and novelist.
- 30 January – Howard Kilroy, businessman (died 2019).
- 2 February
  - Fergal O'Hanlon, Irish Republican Army member (killed 1957 with Seán South attacking the Royal Ulster Constabulary barracks in Brookeborough).
  - Tony Ryan, businessman and philanthropist, founder of Guinness Peat Aviation and a founder of Ryanair (died 2007).
- 12 February – Monica Barnes, Fine Gael Teachta Dála.
- 17 February – Joe Haverty, soccer player.
- 18 February – Ciarán Bourke, musician, an original member of The Dubliners (died 1988).
- 3 March – Christopher Jones, Bishop of Elphin (1994– ).
- 11 March – Pat Brady, soccer player.
- 14 March – Vincent Brady, Fianna Fáil politician, Government Chief Whip and Minister for Defence.
- 15 March – David Andrews, Fianna Fáil TD, Cabinet Minister and Chairman of the Irish Red Cross.
- 22 March – Patsy Dorgan, footballer (Blackburn Rovers, Cork Hibernians, Cork Celtic) (died 2021).
- 1 April – Gerry O'Sullivan, Labour Party (Ireland) TD, Minister of State and Lord Mayor of Cork (died 1994).
- 7 April – Mick McGrath, soccer player and manager.
- 17 April – Brendan Kennelly, poet and novelist (died 2021)
- 19 April – Séamus Pattison, Labour Party TD and Ceann Comhairle (died 2018).
- 1 May – Colm Hilliard, Fianna Fáil TD (died 2002).
- 7 May – Tony O'Reilly, rugby player and businessman (died 2024).
- 8 May – Michael O'Leary, Tánaiste and Labour Party leader (died 2006).
- 6 June – William Murphy, Bishop of Kerry (1995– ).
- 8 June – Michael O'Leary, leader of the Labour Party, Tánaiste and Cabinet Minister.
- 9 June – Mick O'Dwyer, Gaelic footballer and manager.
- 15 June – Gerry Culliton, rugby player (died 2012).
- 1 July – Gerard Brady, senior Fianna Fáil politician, Minister for Education (died 2020).
- 5 July – Brendan Halligan, economist and Labour Party politician (died 2020).
- 6 July – Dave Allen, born David Tynan O'Mahony, comedian (died 2005).
- 9 July – Bobby Molloy, Fianna Fáil/Progressive Democrats TD and Cabinet Minister (died 2016).
- 13 August – James Moriarty, Bishop of the Diocese of Kildare and Leighlin.
- 23 August – Godfrey Graham, cricketer.
- 1 September – Jim Kemmy, Labour Party and Democratic Socialist Party TD (died 1997).
- 15 September – Máirín Quill, Progressive Democrats TD.
- 18 September – Big Tom (McBride), country singer and musician (died 2018).
- 24 September – John Magee SPS, Bishop of Cloyne (1987– ), private secretary to Pope John Paul II.
- 27 September – Barry Cogan, Fianna Fáil TD and Senator.
- 1 October - Ernie Caffrey, Fine Gael Senator (died 2026).
- 5 October – Brian Hannon, Bishop of Clogher (Church of Ireland) from 1986 to 2001 (died 2022).
- 10 October – Dickie Rock, singer and songwriter (died 2024).
- 19 October – Patrick Masterson, writer and academic.
- 21 October – William Parsons, 7th Earl of Rosse, peer.
- 27 November – Feargal Quinn, businessman, founder of Superquinn, independent member of Seanad Éireann (died 2019).
- 12 December – Noel Sheridan, actor, artist, Director National College of Art and Design (1979–2003).
- 16 December – Jim Fitzsimons, Fianna Fáil TD, Cabinet Minister and MEP.
- Full date unknown
  - Brian Bourke, painter.
  - Mattie McDonagh, Gaelic footballer with Galway (died 2005).

== Deaths ==
- 10 January – William Kenny, soldier, recipient of the Victoria Cross for gallantry in 1914 near Ypres, Belgium (born 1880).
- 20 January – George V, King of the United Kingdom of Great Britain and Northern Ireland (born 1865).
- 26 January – Francis O'Neill, police officer in America and collector of Irish traditional music (born 1848).
- February – Harry Corley, cricketer (born 1878).
- 20 March – Justin Huntly McCarthy, politician and author (born 1859).
- 24 March – Henry Boyle Townshend Somerville, Royal Navy Hydrographic Surveyor, murdered by Irish Republican Army (born 1863).
- 6 June – Eamonn Duggan, solicitor, nationalist, member First Dáil (Pro Treaty), representing South Meath, Minister for Home Affairs (1922) (born 1874).
- 14 July – William Cosgrove, recipient of the Victoria Cross for gallantry in 1915 at the Battle of Gallipoli, Turkey (born 1888).
- 14 July – Patrick Hogan, Sinn Féin and Cumann na nGaedheal TD (born 1891).
- 22 July – Sir Osmond Esmonde, 12th Baronet, diplomat and politician (born 1896).
- 29 July – Frank Gavan Duffy, fourth Chief Justice of the High Court of Australia (born 1852).
- 6 August – Margaretta Eagar, nurse for the four daughters of Tsar Nicholas II and Tsarina Alexandra and memoirist (born 1863).
- 8 September – John Sweetman, politician, a founder of Sinn Féin and second President of the party in 1908 (born 1844).
- 27 October – William Jellett, Irish Unionist MP in the Parliament of the United Kingdom (born 1857).
- 30 November – Jimmy Elwood, footballer (born 1901).
- 1 December – Hugh Kennedy, only Attorney-General of Southern Ireland, first Attorney-General of the Irish Free State and first Chief Justice of the Irish Free State (born 1879).
- December – Tommy Wood, soldier in the International Brigades, fatally wounded in Battle of Lopera (Spanish Civil War) (born c. 1919).
