= 1933–34 League of Ireland =

League of Ireland
- Season: 1933–34
- Champions: Bohemians (4th title)
- Matches: 90
- Goals: 288 (3.2 per match)
- Top goalscorer: Alf Rigby (13 goals)

The 1933–34 League of Ireland was the thirteenth season of the League of Ireland. Dundalk were the defending champions.

Bohemians won their fourth title.

== Overview ==
No new teams were elected to the League.

== Teams ==
Locations of the 1933–34 League of Ireland teams

| Team | Location | Stadium |
|---|---|---|
| Bohemians | Dublin (Phibsborough) | Dalymount Park |
| Bray Unknowns | Bray | Woodbrook Ground |
| Cork | Cork (Mardyke) | Mardyke |
| Cork Bohemians | Cork (Ballintemple) | Munster Agricultural Society Showgrounds |
| Dolphin | Dublin (Dolphin's Barn) | Dolphin Park |
| Drumcondra | Dublin (Clonturk) | Clonturk Park |
| Dundalk | Dundalk | Athletic Grounds |
| St. James's Gate | Dublin (Crumlin) | St. James's Park |
| Shamrock Rovers | Dublin (Milltown) | Glenmalure Park |
| Shelbourne | Dublin (Ringsend) | Shelbourne Park |

== Table ==
| Pos | Team | Pld | W | D | L | GF | GA | GD | Pts |
|---|---|---|---|---|---|---|---|---|---|
| 1 | Bohemians | 18 | 11 | 5 | 2 | 38 | 23 | +15 | 27 |
| 2 | Cork | 18 | 11 | 4 | 3 | 47 | 26 | +21 | 26 |
| 3 | Shamrock Rovers | 18 | 9 | 4 | 5 | 28 | 23 | +5 | 22 |
| 4 | Dundalk | 18 | 9 | 3 | 6 | 33 | 25 | +8 | 21 |
| 5 | Dolphin | 18 | 7 | 3 | 8 | 23 | 21 | +2 | 17 |
| 6 | Shelbourne | 18 | 6 | 5 | 7 | 22 | 25 | −3 | 17 |
| 7 | Drumcondra | 18 | 6 | 4 | 8 | 27 | 28 | −1 | 16 |
| 8 | St James's Gate | 18 | 5 | 3 | 10 | 26 | 32 | −6 | 13 |
| 9 | Bray Unknowns | 18 | 6 | 1 | 11 | 26 | 44 | −18 | 13 |
| 10 | Cork Bohemians | 18 | 2 | 4 | 12 | 18 | 41 | −23 | 8 |

Source: www.rsssf.com

== Results ==
| Home \ Away | BOH | BRY | CFC | CBO | DOL | DRU | DUN | SHM | SHE | STG |
|---|---|---|---|---|---|---|---|---|---|---|
| Bohemians | — | 3–1 | 1–4 | 4–3 | 1–1 | 1–1 | 2–2 | 1–0 | 2–0 | 2–2 |
| Bray Unknowns | 1–0 | — | 3–4 | +:- (Note: The match between Bray Unknowns and Cork Bohemians was rated as a goalless win for Bray.) | 0–3 | 1–1 | 5–3 | 3–2 | 3–2 | 1–4 |
| Cork | 3–3 | 4–2 | — | 4–1 | 4–1 | 2–1 | 4–0 | 3–0 | 0–0 | 3–1 |
| Cork Bohemians | 1–3 | 2–0 | 1–4 | — | 2–0 | 1–3 | 1–1 | 1–2 | 1–1 | 0–0 |
| Dolphin | 0–2 | 4–1 | 0–0 | 3–0 | — | 1–0 | 3–0 | 0–1 | 2–0 | 0–1 |
| Drumcondra | 0–2 | 3–0 | 3–0 | 3–1 | 2–2 | — | 0–1 | 1–2 | 1–1 | 3–2 |
| Dundalk | 0–1 | 5–2 | 2–1 | 3–0 | 4–1 | 2–0 | — | 2–0 | 2–0 | 3–0 |
| Shamrock Rovers | 2–3 | 2–1 | 2–2 | 4–0 | 2–1 | 1–0 | 2–2 | — | 0–0 | 3–1 |
| Shelbourne | 2–6 | 1–0 | 2–4 | 3–0 | 1–0 | 5–1 | 1–0 | 1–1 | — | 0–1 |
| St James's Gate | 0–1 | 1–2 | 3–1 | 3–3 | 0–1 | 3–4 | 2–1 | 1–2 | 1–2 | — |

Legend: Blue = home team win; Yellow = draw; Red = away team win.

== Top goalscorers ==
| Pos | Player | Club | Goals |
|---|---|---|---|
| 1 | Alf Rigby | St James's Gate | 13 |
| 2 | Ray Rogers | Bohemians | 12 |
| 3 | Billy Merry | Drumcondra | 11 |
| 3 | Tim O'Keefe | Cork | 11 |

== See also ==
- 1933–34 FAI Cup
