= 1934–35 League of Ireland =

League of Ireland
- Season: 1934–35
- Champions: Dolphin (1st title)
- Matches: 90
- Goals: 380 (4.22 per match)
- Top goalscorer: Alf Rigby (17 goals)

The 1934–35 League of Ireland was the fourteenth season of the League of Ireland. Bohemians were the defending champions.

Dolphin won their first title.

== Overview ==
Cork Bohemians and Shelbourne were not re-elected to the League, while Waterford and Sligo Rovers were elected in their place. Waterford were re-elected after a two-year absence, while Sligo Rovers became the first team from Connacht to compete in the League.

== Teams ==
Locations of the 1934–35 League of Ireland teams

Team	Location	Stadium
Bohemians	Dublin (Phibsborough)	Dalymount Park
Bray Unknowns	Bray	Woodbrook Ground
Cork	Cork (Mardyke)	Mardyke
Dolphin	Dublin (Dolphin's Barn)	Dolphin Park
Drumcondra	Dublin (Clonturk)	Clonturk Park
Dundalk	Dundalk	Athletic Grounds
St. James's Gate	Dublin (Crumlin)	St. James's Park
Shamrock Rovers	Dublin (Milltown)	Glenmalure Park
Sligo Rovers	Sligo	The Showgrounds
Waterford	Waterford	Kilcohan Park

== Table ==
Pos	Team	Pld	W	D	L	GF	GA	GD	Pts
1	Dolphin	18	12	4	2	48	21	+27	28
2	St James's Gate	18	12	3	3	46	33	+13	27
3	Sligo Rovers	18	8	4	6	44	30	+14	20
4	Bohemians	18	9	2	7	44	36	+8	20
5	Dundalk	18	8	4	6	37	32	+5	20
6	Shamrock Rovers	18	5	6	7	27	33	−6	16
7	Bray Unknowns	18	6	3	9	39	56	−17	15
8	Waterford	18	4	4	10	43	54	−11	12
9	Drumcondra	18	4	4	10	22	39	−17	12
10	Cork	18	3	4	11	30	46	−16	10

Source: www.rsssf.com

== Results ==
Home \ Away	BOH	BRY	CFC	DOL	DRU	DUN	SHM	SLI	STG	WAT
Bohemians	—	5–3	4–1	0–4	2–2	2–3	1–1	1–2	3–1	4–0
Bray Unknowns	0–4	—	4–3	1–1	2–0	4–2	2–2	3–1	3–6	3–5
Cork	6–2	3–5	—	1–2	1–2	2–2	3–1	1–1	0–1	2–2
Dolphin	1–2	6–1	3–1	—	5–1	2–0	2–1	3–0	2–4	3–2
Drumcondra	1–0	1–2	4–1	0–0	—	0–4	2–1	1–3	0–2	1–1
Dundalk	5–1	3–2	0–1	2–2	4–3	—	0–0	4–2	1–3	2–1
Shamrock Rovers	2–5	3–1	1–1	0–2	2–1	3–1	—	2–2	0–2	3–2
Sligo Rovers	0–2	2–2	5–1	0–1	4–0	1–1	4–1	—	2–3	8–2
St James's Gate	3–2	1–0	4–2	2–2	1–1	3–1	1–3	1–4	—	5–4
Waterford	1–4	8–1	3–0	3–7	4–2	0–2	1–1	1–3	3–3	—

Legend: Blue = home team win; Yellow = draw; Red = away team win.

== Top goalscorers ==
Pos	Player	Club	Goals
1	Alf Rigby	St James's Gate	17
2	Charles McDaid	Sligo Rovers	16
3	Walter Walsh	Waterford	13

== See also ==
- 1934–35 FAI Cup
