= 1935–36 FAI Cup =

Tournament details
- Country: Ireland
- Dates: 1 January – 19 April 1936
- Teams: 16

Final positions
- Champions: Shamrock Rovers
- Runners-up: Cork

Tournament statistics
- Matches played: 22
- Goals scored: 101 (4.59 per match)

The FAI Cup 1935–36^{[A]} was the fifteenth edition of Ireland's premier cup competition, The Football Association of Ireland Challenge Cup or FAI Cup. The tournament began on 1 January 1936 and concluded on 19 April with the final held at Dalymount Park, Dublin. An official attendance^{[B]} of 30,946 people watched Shamrock Rovers claim their seventh title by defeating Cork.

== First round ==
Tie no	Home team	Score	Away team	Date
1	GSR	1-4	Reds United	1 January 1936
2	Bohemians	7-0	Waterford	11 January 1936
3	Cork	2-2	Bray Unknowns	12 January 1936
replay	Bray Unknowns	1-6	Cork	15 January 1936
4	Dolphin	1-0^{[C]}	Drumcondra	12 January 1936
refix^{[C]}	Dolphin	3-6	Drumcondra	16 January 1936
5	Dundalk	7-1	B&I	12 January 1936
6	Hospitals Trust	2-5	Sligo Rovers	12 January 1936
7	Shamrock Rovers	1-1	St James's Gate	12 January 1936
replay	St James's Gate	1-2	Shamrock Rovers	15 January 1936
8	Tramore Rookies	1-5	Brideville	12 January 1936

== Second round ==
Tie no	Home team	Score	Away team	Date
1	Bohemians	1-1	Cork	8 February 1936
replay	Cork	3-2	Bohemians	19 February 1936
2	Dundalk	2-1	Reds United	8 February 1936
3	Drumcondra	1-1	Sligo Rovers	9 February 1936
replay	Sligo Rovers	1-1	Drumcondra	12 February 1936
replay(2)	Drumcondra	3-2	Sligo Rovers	19 February 1936
4	Shamrock Rovers	5-1	Brideville	9 February 1936

== Semi-finals ==
1 March, 1936

Shamrock Rovers	2–2	Dundalk
Moore; Glen(pen)		Morgan; McCourt

Dalymount Park, Dublin

22 March, 1936

Cork	5–2	Drumcondra
Turnbull(3); King; O'Reilly		Meehan; Donnelly

The Mardyke, Cork

=== Replay ===
4 March, 1936

Shamrock Rovers	2–1	Dundalk
Ward; Scully		O' Neill(pen)

Iveagh Grounds, Crumlin, Dublin

== Final ==
19 April, 1936

Shamrock Rovers	2–1	Cork
Moore 46'; Reid 53'		Turnbull 80'

Dalymount Park, Dublin
Attendance: 30,946

Winner of FAI Cup 1935–36
Shamrock Rovers
7th Title

== Notes ==
A. From 1923 to 1936, the FAI Cup was known as the Free State Cup.

B. Attendances were calculated using gate receipts which limited their accuracy as a large proportion of people, particularly children, attended football matches in Ireland throughout the 20th century for free by a number of means.

C. ^{a} Fixture abandoned due to encroachment of spectators. Re-Fixture played on 16 January.
