= 1927–28 League of Ireland =

League of Ireland
- Season: 1927–28
- Champions: Bohemians (2nd title)
- Matches: 90
- Goals: 384 (4.27 per match)
- Top goalscorer: Charles Heinemann (24 goals)
- Biggest home win: Shelbourne 9-1 Athlone Town
- Biggest away win: Jacobs 0-7 Shelbourne
- Highest scoring: Shelbourne 9-1 Athlone Town; Shelbourne 8-2 Bray Unknowns; Bray Unknowns 3-7 Dundalk GNR

The 1927–28 League of Ireland was the seventh season of the League of Ireland. Shamrock Rovers were the defending champions.

Bohemians won their second title.

== Overview ==
For the first time since the league's founding, the lineup of teams remained unchanged from the previous season.

== Teams ==
Locations of the 1927–28 League of Ireland teams

Team	Location	Stadium
Athlone Town	Athlone	Sports Ground
Bohemians	Dublin (Phibsborough)	Dalymount Park
Bray Unknowns	Bray	Woodbrook Ground
Brideville	Dublin (The Liberties)	Richmond Park
Dundalk GNR	Dundalk	Athletic Grounds
Fordsons	Cork	Ballinlough Road
Jacobs	Dublin (Crumlin)	Rutland Avenue
St. James's Gate	Dublin (Crumlin)	St. James's Park
Shamrock Rovers	Dublin (Milltown)	Glenmalure Park
Shelbourne	Dublin (Ringsend)	Shelbourne Park

== Table ==
Pos	Team	Pld	W	D	L	GF	GA	GD	Pts
1	Bohemians	18	15	1	2	53	20	+33	31
2	Shelbourne	18	13	2	3	67	24	+43	28
3	Shamrock Rovers	18	9	7	2	41	18	+23	25
4	Fordsons	18	9	4	5	46	34	+12	22
5	Dundalk GNR	18	9	3	6	44	36	+8	21
6	Brideville	18	7	5	6	37	33	+4	19
7	St James's Gate	18	5	4	9	28	42	−14	14
8	Jacobs	18	2	5	11	20	46	−26	9
9	Bray Unknowns	18	1	4	13	29	70	−41	6
10	Athlone Town	18	2	1	15	19	61	−42	5

Source: www.rsssf.com
Rules for classification: 1) points; 2) goal difference; 3) number of goals scored.

== Results ==
Home \ Away	ATH	BOH	BRY	BRI	DUN	FOR	JAC	STG	SHM	SHE
Athlone Town	—	1–2	2–1	2–5	2–5	0–2	2–1	0–0	0–4	2–7
Bohemians	2–1	—	5–1	4–2	2–0	4–0	2–0	5–1	3–2	2–3
Bray Unknowns	4–2	1–5	—	1–3	3–7	2–5	0–0	1–3	2–5	0–4
Brideville	3–1	1–4	2–2	—	1–4	4–2	3–2	4–2	0–0	1–2
Dundalk GNR	1–0	1–4	3–1	2–1	—	2–3	2–0	4–1	3–3	2–4
Fordsons	5–0	2–0	5–2	1–1	2–2	—	4–2	5–0	2–2	2–1
Jacobs	4–1	1–4	3–3	1–1	0–3	2–2	—	0–0	1–3	0–7
St. James's Gate	3–1	2–3	3–3	2–5	2–1	2–1	1–2	—	1–1	3–1
Shamrock Rovers	3–1	0–0	5–0	0–0	5–0	2–0	3–1	2–1	—	1–1
Shelbourne	9–1	1–2	8–2	1–0	2–2	6–3	5–0	3–1	2–0	—

Legend: Blue = home team win; Yellow = draw; Red = away team win.

== Top goalscorers ==
Pos	Player	Club	Goals
1	Charles Heinemann	Fordsons	24
2	Paddy McIlvenny	Shelbourne	22
3	John McMillan	Shelbourne	17

== See also ==
- 1927–28 FAI Cup
