= 1926–27 FAI Cup =

Tournament details
- Country: Republic of Ireland

Final positions
- Champions: Drumcondra (1st title)

Tournament statistics
- Matches played: 12
- Goals scored: 44 (3.67 per match)

The FAI Cup 1926-27^{[A]} was the sixth edition of Ireland's premier cup competition, The Football Association of Ireland Challenge Cup or FAI Cup. The tournament began on 8 January 1927 and concluded on 9 April with the final replay held at Shelbourne Park, Dublin. An official attendance^{[B]} of 10,000 people watched Leinster Senior League side Drumcondra defeat Brideville in the first final to be decided in extra time. Drumcondra completed a cup double having already won the FAI Intermediate Cup

== First round ==
Tie no	Home team	Score	Away team	Date
1	Athlone Town	1–4	Shelbourne	8 January 1927
2	Bohemians	6–1	Dundalk	8 January 1927
3	Bray Unknowns	3–0	Shamrock Rovers	8 January 1927
4	Brideville	2–1	Cobh Ramblers	9 January 1927
5	Jacobs	0–3	Drumcondra	9 January 1927
6	Fordsons	2–1	St James's Gate	9 January 1927

== Second round ==
Tie no	Home team	Score	Away team	Date
1	Shelbourne	5–1	Bray Unknowns	22 January 1927
2	Fordsons	2–3	Bohemians	23 January 1927

Bye	Brideville
Bye	Drumcondra

== Semi-finals ==
5 February, 1927

Brideville	2–0	Shelbourne
Murtagh(2)

Dalymount Park, Dublin

19 February, 1927

Drumcondra	3–1	Bohemians
Swan; Coyle; Murray		Matthews

Shelbourne Park, Dublin

== Final ==
17 March, 1927

Drumcondra	1–1	Brideville
McCarney		McCarthy

Dalymount Park, Dublin
Attendance: 25,000
Referee: Jack Howcroft (Bolton)

=== Replay ===
9 April, 1927

Drumcondra	1–0	Brideville
Murray (aet.)

Shelbourne Park, Dublin
Attendance: 10,000

Winner of FAI Cup 1926–27
Drumcondra
1st Title

== Notes ==
A. From 1923 to 1936, the FAI Cup was known as the Free State Cup.

B. Attendances were calculated using gate receipts which limited their accuracy as a large proportion of people, particularly children, attended football matches in Ireland throughout the 20th century for free by a number of means.
