= 1932–33 League of Ireland =

League of Ireland
- Season: 1932–33
- Champions: Dundalk (1st title)
- Matches: 90
- Goals: 344 (3.82 per match)
- Top goalscorer: George Ebbs (20 goals)

The 1932–33 League of Ireland was the twelfth season of the League of Ireland. Shamrock Rovers were the defending champions.

Dundalk won their first title, becoming the first team from outside Dublin to do so.

== Overview ==
Two teams were not re-elected to the League (Brideville and Jacobs), while Waterford resigned voluntarily. Only one new team was elected (Cork Bohemians), resulting in the League reducing in size from twelve teams to ten.

== Teams ==
Locations of the 1932–33 League of Ireland teams

Team	Location	Stadium
Bohemians	Dublin (Phibsborough)	Dalymount Park
Bray Unknowns	Bray	Woodbrook Ground
Cork	Cork (Mardyke)	Mardyke
Cork Bohemians	Cork (Ballintemple)	Munster Agricultural Society Showgrounds
Dolphin	Dublin (Dolphin's Barn)	Dolphin Park
Drumcondra	Dublin (Clonturk)	Clonturk Park
Dundalk	Dundalk	Athletic Grounds
St. James's Gate	Dublin (Crumlin)	St. James's Park
Shamrock Rovers	Dublin (Milltown)	Glenmalure Park
Shelbourne	Dublin (Ringsend)	Shelbourne Park

== Table ==
Pos	Team	Pld	W	D	L	GF	GA	GD	Pts
1	Dundalk	18	13	3	2	44	21	+23	29
2	Shamrock Rovers	18	11	2	5	48	32	+16	24
3	Shelbourne	18	10	3	5	45	26	+19	23
4	Cork	18	10	1	7	35	35	0	21
5	Bray Unknowns	18	6	7	5	29	29	0	19
6	St James's Gate	18	8	1	9	39	41	−2	17
7	Cork Bohemians	18	4	6	8	30	38	−8	14
8	Dolphin	18	5	4	9	28	39	−11	14
9	Bohemians	18	4	5	9	24	40	−16	13
10	Drumcondra	18	1	4	13	22	43	−21	6

Source: www.rsssf.com

== Results ==
Home \ Away	BOH	BRY	CFC	CBO	DOL	DRU	DUN	SHM	SHE	STG
Bohemians	—	1–1	4–1	0–0	1–0	1–0	0–4	2–3	0–4	3–2
Bray Unknowns	0–0	—	3–0	1–0	2–2	3–3	1–1	3–2	1–1	2–1
Cork	2–0	2–1	—	3–0	3–0	4–3	2–5	3–1	1–2	4–1
Cork Bohemians	3–1	3–4	1–2	—	2–5	4–2	0–1	1–4	4–3	4–2
Dolphin	2–0	1–1	1–1	2–0	—	0–0	0–2	5–2	3–1	0–3
Drumcondra	2–2	0–1	1–3	3–3	2–1	—	1–3	0–2	0–1	1–2
Dundalk	4–2	2–1	1–0	1–1	5–2	2–1	—	0–2	3–0	4–2
Shamrock Rovers	2–2	6–2	5–1	1–1	4–2	5–1	2–1	—	3–2	1–3
Shelbourne	4–0	2–1	5–1	2–2	6–1	3–1	2–2	2–0	—	0–1
St James's Gate	6–5	2–1	1–2	1–1	4–1	3–1	2–3	1–3	2–5	—

Legend: Blue = home team win; Yellow = draw; Red = away team win.

== Top goalscorers ==
Pos	Player	Club	Goals
1	George Ebbs	St James's Gate	20

== See also ==
- 1932–33 FAI Cup
