= Pearson Ferguson =

Scottish footballer

Personal information
- Full name: Pearson Ferguson
- Date of birth: 1909
- Place of birth: Coalburn, Scotland
- Date of death: 1985 (aged 75–76)
- Place of death: Greenock, Scotland
- Position: Outside left

Senior career*
Years	Team	Apps	(Gls)
- Kello Rovers
1929–1931	Ayr United	54	(20)
1931–1932	Cork		(21)
1932–1933	Ayr United	18	(5)
1933	Queen of the South	4	(1)
1933–1935	Carlisle United	68	(19)
1935–1937	Morton	39	(30)
1937–1938	Montrose	17	(10)
1938–1939	East Stirlingshire	29	(13)
- * Club domestic league appearances and goals

Pearson Ferguson (1909–1985) was a Scottish professional footballer who played in the Scottish League for Ayr United, Queen of the South, Morton, Montrose and East Stirlingshire, for Cork in the Irish Free State League, and for Carlisle United in the English Football League. He played as an outside left.

== Life and career ==
Ferguson was born in Coalburn, South Lanarkshire, the younger brother of Willie Ferguson, who went on to play for Chelsea and play for and manage Queen of the South. Like his brother, Pearson began his football career with Kello Rovers, the junior team local to the family home in Kirkconnel, Dumfries and Galloway. He moved on to Ayr United, and was playing for that club in the First Division in the 1929–30 season.

He moved to Ireland in the 1931 close season to join Cork. He scored in the opening match of the season as Cork came back from two goals down to secure a 3–3 draw away to Dolphin, scored in the next match, a 2–2 draw with Shamrock Rovers, scored twice in the third, a 6–0 demolition of Jacobs, and in the fifth, exploited his pace to contribute four goals to a 5–3 defeat of Waterford. He finished the 22-game season with 21 goals, which made him the League of Ireland's top scorer (jointly with Waterford's Jack Forster) and helped his club finish runners-up to Shamrock Rovers.

Like most of the "cross-Channel" players who had played in Ireland that season, Ferguson returned home, where he rejoined Ayr United. He then played five times for Queen of the South in the second half of the 1932–33 season, before moving south of the border to join Carlisle United of the Third Division North. In the second of his two seasons in England, he was Carlisle's leading scorer, but with only eleven goals as they finished bottom of the league.

Ferguson then returned to Scotland and spent four more seasons in the second division: two with Morton (plus one appearance in the top tier at the start of a third after helping them to promotion in the 1936–37 season) before moving on to Montrose then East Stirlingshire for a year apiece.

== Honours ==
Individual

- League of Ireland Top Scorer:
  - 1931–32
