= Charles Heinemann =

English footballer

Personal information
- Full name: Charles Adolph Heinemann
- Date of birth: 29 February 1904
- Place of birth: Stafford, England
- Date of death: 1974 (aged 69–70)
- Position: Inside forward

Senior career*
Years	Team	Apps	(Gls)
1921–1922	EEC Siemens Works		
1922–1923	Riverscote		
1923–1925	Stafford Rangers		
1925–1926	Bristol Rovers	3	(0)
1926	Port Vale	0	(0)
1926	Stafford Rangers		
1926–1927	Fordsons		(24+)
1927–1928	Port Vale	0	(0)
1929–1930	Oakengates Town		
1930–193?	Wallingford Town		
Total		3+	(0+)

International career
1927	League of Ireland XI	2	(0)
- * Club domestic league appearances and goals

Charles Adolph Heinemann (29 February 1904 – 1974) was an English professional footballer who played as an inside forward. During his time with Fordsons, he became the top scorer for the 1927–28 League of Ireland season, scoring 24 times in league competition.

Heinemann also represented the League of Ireland XI in two representative matches against the Welsh League in 1927. He top-scored in the 1927–28 League of Ireland season with 24 goals.

== Career statistics ==
Appearances and goals by club, season and competition
Club	Season	League			FA Cup		Total	
Club	Season	Division	Apps	Goals	Apps	Goals	Apps	Goals
Bristol Rovers	1925–26	Third Division South	3	0	0	0	3	0
Port Vale	1926–27	Second Division	0	0	0	0	0	0
Port Vale	1927–28	Second Division	0	0	0	0	0	0
