= 1930–31 FAI Cup =

Tournament details
- Country: Republic of Ireland

Final positions
- Champions: Shamrock Rovers (4th title)

Tournament statistics
- Matches played: 19
- Goals scored: 73 (3.84 per match)

The FAI Cup 1930–31^{[A]} was the tenth edition of Ireland's premier cup competition, The Football Association of Ireland Challenge Cup or FAI Cup. The tournament began on 28 December 1930 and concluded on 9 May 1931 with the final replay held at Dalymount Park, Dublin. An official attendance^{[B]} of 10,000 people watched Shamrock Rovers claim the third of five FAI Cup titles in a row by defeating Dundalk.

== First round ==
| Tie no | Home team | Score | Away team | Date |
|---|---|---|---|---|
| 1 | Cork Bohemians | 3–2 | Drumcondra | 28 December 1930 |
| 2 | Shamrock Rovers | 2–1 | Shelbourne | 10 January 1931 |
| 3 | Cork | 0–0 | Bohemians | 11 January 1931 |
| replay | Bohemians | 1–0 | Cork | 15 January 1931 |
| 4 | Dolphin | 3–2 | Brideville | 11 January 1931 |
| 5 | Dundalk | 4–2 | Jacobs | 11 January 1931 |
| 6 | St James's Gate | 2–2 | Bray Unknowns | 11 January 1931 |
| replay | Bray Unknowns | 4–3 | St James's Gate | 15 January 1931 |
| 7 | St. Vincent's | 1–3 | Edenville | 11 January 1931 |
| 8 | Waterford | 5–3 | Rossville | 11 January 1931 |

== Second round ==
| Tie no | Home team | Score | Away team | Date |
|---|---|---|---|---|
| 1 | Bohemians | 5–1 | Edenville | 7 February 1931 |
| 2 | Dundalk | 3–1 | Cork Bohemians | 8 February 1931 |
| 3 | Shamrock Rovers | 5–1 | Bray Unknowns | 8 February 1931 |
| 4 | Waterford | 2–3 | Dolphin | 8 February 1931 |

== Semi-finals ==
8 March, 1931

| Dundalk | 1–1 | Dolphin |
|---|---|---|
| Slowey(pen) | | Carroll |

Iveagh Grounds, Crumlin, Dublin

28 March, 1931

| Shamrock Rovers | 3–0 | Bohemians |
|---|---|---|
| Moore (3) |

Shelbourne Park, Dublin

=== Replay ===
11 March, 1931

| Dundalk | 3–1 | Dolphin |
|---|---|---|
| Donnelly; McCourt; Hirst | | Somers |

Dalymount Park, Dublin

== Final ==
18 April, 1931

| Shamrock Rovers | 1–1 | Dundalk |
|---|---|---|
| Moore 84' | | McCourt 30' |

Dalymount Park, Dublin
Attendance: 20,000

=== Replay ===
9 May, 1931

| Shamrock Rovers | 1–0 | Dundalk |
|---|---|---|
| Moore |

Dalymount Park, Dublin
Attendance: 10,000
Referee: Mr H.N. Mee (Nottingham)

Winner of FAI Cup 1930–31
Shamrock Rovers
4th Title

== Notes ==
A. From 1923 to 1936, the FAI Cup was known as the Free State Cup.

B. Attendances were calculated using gate receipts which limited their accuracy as a large proportion of people, particularly children, attended football matches in Ireland throughout the 20th century for free by a number of means.
