= Fordsons =

Fordsons may refer to:

- Fordson, a type of Ford tractor mostly made in Ireland but also in Detroit (Ford & Son)
- Ford of Britain, lorries, trucks and small trucks and vans made at Dagenham England
- Fordsons F.C., a defunct Irish soccer team from the tractor-making business
