= 1927–28 FAI Cup =

Tournament details
- Country: Republic of Ireland

Final positions
- Champions: Bohemians (1st title)

Tournament statistics
- Matches played: 19
- Goals scored: 87 (4.58 per match)

The FAI Cup 1927–28^{[A]} was the seventh edition of Ireland's premier cup competition, The Football Association of Ireland Challenge Cup or FAI Cup. The tournament began on 7 January 1928 and concluded on 17 March with the final held at Dalymount Park, Dublin. An official attendance^{[B]} of 25,000 people watched amateur side Bohemians defeat defending champions Drumcondra to secure a quadruple of trophies.

== First round ==
Tie no	Home team	Score	Away team	Date
1	Athlone Town	3–9	Drumcondra	7 January 1928
2	Bohemians	7–0	Cobh Ramblers	7 January 1928
3	Jacobs	2–1	Strandville	7 January 1928
4	Shelbourne	2–0	Brideville	7 January 1928
5	Bray Unknowns	6–1	Bendigo	8 January 1928
6	Cork Bohemians	2–4	Fordsons	8 January 1928
7	St James's Gate	4–0	Cork City	8 January 1928
8	Shamrock Rovers	3–3	Dundalk	8 January 1928
replay	Dundalk	4–1	Shamrock Rovers	12 January 1928

== Second round ==
Tie no	Home team	Score	Away team	Date
1	Bohemians	5–0	St James's Gate	21 January 1928
2	Shelbourne	3–1	Dundalk	21 January 1928
3	Fordsons	4–0	Jacobs	22 January 1928
4	Bray Unknowns	2–2	Drumcondra	25 January 1928
replay	Drumcondra	4–1	Bray Unknowns	29 January 1928

== Semi-finals ==
4 February, 1928

Bohemians	1–1	Shelbourne
McMahon (pen)		McCarthy(o.g.)

Dalymount Park, Dublin

19 February, 1928

Fordsons	0–3	Drumcondra
		McCarney; Doyle(2)

Mardyke, Cork

=== Replay ===
19 February, 1928

Bohemians	0–0	Shelbourne

Dalymount Park, Dublin

=== Second replay ===
22 February, 1928

Bohemians	4–1	Shelbourne
Dennis; Daly(o.g.); White; C.Robinson		Kinsella

Dalymount Park, Dublin

== Final ==
17 March, 1928

Bohemians	2–1	Drumcondra
White; Dennis		Keogh

Dalymount Park, Dublin
Attendance: 25,000
Referee: Jean Langenus (Belgium)

Winner of FAI Cup 1927–28
Bohemians
1st Title

== Notes ==
A. From 1923 to 1936, the FAI Cup was known as the Free State Cup.

B. Attendances were calculated using gate receipts which limited their accuracy as a large proportion of people, particularly children, attended football matches in Ireland throughout the 20th century for free by a number of means.
