= 1928–29 FAI Cup =

Tournament details
- Country: Republic of Ireland

Final positions
- Champions: Shamrock Rovers (2nd title)

Tournament statistics
- Matches played: 19
- Goals scored: 65 (3.42 per match)

The FAI Cup 1928–29^{[A]} was the eighth edition of Ireland's premier cup competition, The Football Association of Ireland Challenge Cup or FAI Cup. The tournament began on 5 January 1929 and concluded on 6 April with the final replay held at Shelbourne Park, Dublin. An official attendance^{[B]} of approximately 15,000 people watched Shamrock Rovers win the first of five FAI Cup titles in a row by defeating holders Bohemians.

== First round ==
Tie no	Home team	Score	Away team	Date
1	Bohemians	2-0	St James's Gate	5 January 1929
2	Richmond Rovers	0-2	Dundalk	5 January 1929
3	Shamrock Rovers	3-2	Shelbourne	5 January 1929
4	Bray Unknowns	2-1	Brideville	6 January 1929
5	Drumcondra	3-1	Fordsons	6 January 1929
6	Fermoy	0-1	Richmond United	6 January 1929
7	Jacobs	1-1	Dolphin	6 January 1929
replay	Dolphin	2-3	Jacobs	9 January 1929
8	Waterford Celtic	1-1	Cork Bohemians	6 January 1929
replay	Cork Bohemians	4-1	Waterford Celtic	9 January 1929

== Second round ==
Tie no	Home team	Score	Away team	Date
1	Bohemians	2-2	Jacobs	19 January 1929
replay	Jacobs	2-4	Bohemians	23 January 1929
2	Dundalk	6-2	Bray Unknowns	19 January 1929
3	Shamrock Rovers	4-0	Richmond United	19 January 1929
4	Drumcondra	3-1	Cork Bohemians	20 January 1929

== Semi-finals ==
2 February, 1929

Shamrock Rovers	3–0	Dundalk
Sloan(3)

Tolka Park, Dublin

16 February, 1929

Bohemians	2–0	Drumcondra
McMahon (pen); Andrews

Shelbourne Park, Dublin

== Final ==
18 March, 1929

Shamrock Rovers	0–0	Bohemians

Dalymount Park, Dublin
Attendance: 22,000
Referee: Mr Hull (Burnley)

=== Replay ===
6 April, 1929

Shamrock Rovers	3–0	Bohemians
Flood (2); Fullam

Shelbourne Park, Dublin
Attendance: 15,000(approx.)

Winner of FAI Cup 1928–29
Shamrock Rovers
2nd Title

== Notes ==
A. From 1923 to 1936, the FAI Cup was known as the Free State Cup.

B. Attendances were calculated using gate receipts which limited their accuracy as a large proportion of people, particularly children, attended football matches in Ireland throughout the 20th century for free by a number of means.
