= Tom Burke (Irish footballer) =

Irish footballer

Personal information
- Full name: Thomas Burke
- Date of birth: 17 March 1908
- Place of birth: Cobh, County Cork, Ireland
- Date of death: 24 March 1988 (aged 80)
- Place of death: Cobh, County Cork, Ireland
- Position: Defender

Senior career*
Years	Team	Apps	(Gls)
- Cobh Wanderers
1933–1936	Cork		

International career
1934	Irish Free State	1	(0)
- * Club domestic league appearances and goals

Tom Burke was an Ireland international footballer. Born in Cobh on 17 March 1908, he played mainly as a defender. He played for Cobh Wanderers and Cork F.C.

He was part of the Cork F.C. side that won the 1933–34 FAI Cup. Burke died on 24 March 1988.

== International career ==
In February 1934, Burke made his only appearance for Ireland in a 4–4 draw with Belgium at Dalymount Park in a 1934 FIFA World Cup Qualifying tie.
