= 1930–31 League of Ireland =

League of Ireland
- Season: 1930–31
- Champions: Shelbourne (3rd title)
- Matches played: 132
- Goals scored: 544 (4.12 per match)
- Top goalscorer: Alexander Hair (29 goals)

The 1930–31 League of Ireland was the tenth season of the League of Ireland. Bohemians were the defending champions.

Shelbourne won their third title.

== Overview ==
Two new teams were elected to the League: Dolphin and Waterford.

Fordsons changed their name to Cork. Dundalk dropped their 'G.N.R.' moniker.

== Teams ==
Locations of the 1930–31 League of Ireland teams

Team	Location	Stadium
Bohemians	Dublin (Phibsborough)	Dalymount Park
Bray Unknowns	Bray	Woodbrook Ground
Brideville	Dublin (The Liberties)	Richmond Park
Cork	Cork	Mardyke
Dolphin	Dublin (Dolphin's Barn)	Dolphin Park
Drumcondra	Dublin (Clonturk)	Clonturk Park
Dundalk	Dundalk	Athletic Grounds
Jacobs	Dublin (Crumlin)	Rutland Avenue
St. James's Gate	Dublin (Crumlin)	St. James's Park
Shamrock Rovers	Dublin (Milltown)	Glenmalure Park
Shelbourne	Dublin (Ringsend)	Shelbourne Park
Waterford	Waterford	Kilcohan Park

== Table ==
Pos	Team	Pld	W	D	L	GF	GA	GD	Pts
1	Shelbourne	22	13	5	4	52	22	+30	31
2	Dundalk	22	11	6	5	64	43	+21	28
3	Bohemians	22	10	7	5	45	32	+13	27
4	Cork	22	12	3	7	55	45	+10	27
5	Dolphin	22	11	4	7	51	43	+8	26
6	Brideville	22	10	6	6	49	44	+5	26
7	Shamrock Rovers	22	9	5	8	54	49	+5	23
8	Bray Unknowns	22	8	4	10	41	45	−4	20
9	Waterford	22	8	3	11	43	52	−9	19
10	St James's Gate	22	7	4	11	36	48	−12	18
11	Drumcondra	22	5	5	12	33	49	−16	15
12	Jacobs	22	1	2	19	21	72	−51	4

Source: www.rsssf.com

== Results ==
Home \ Away	BOH	BRY	BRI	CFC	DOL	DRU	DUN	JAC	SHM	SHE	STG	WAT
Bohemians	—	3–2	2–4	2–1	2–2	1–1	3–1	0–1	5–2	1–2	1–1	3–1
Bray Unknowns	3–2	—	3–1	1–1	0–0	3–0	2–2	2–0	4–2	2–3	1–2	2–3
Brideville	0–3	4–2	—	1–1	2–4	3–1	1–1	2–1	2–2	0–3	1–1	3–0
Cork	1–0	2–1	2–3	—	2–4	2–1	3–1	2–1	3–1	1–4	6–1	4–1
Dolphin	1–2	1–3	1–4	6–1	—	3–1	2–2	4–2	2–4	0–2	0–3	3–2
Drumcondra	2–2	0–1	2–5	3–3	2–3	—	1–3	0–0	2–1	0–2	3–2	2–1
Dundalk	2–2	4–2	5–1	1–4	4–3	1–4	—	7–1	6–0	3–3	4–1	7–3
Jacobs	1–2	2–2	1–3	1–4	0–1	1–3	1–5	—	3–5	1–4	2–4	2–3
Shamrock Rovers	3–3	4–1	4–4	3–1	2–2	4–3	1–2	7–0	—	1–0	2–1	1–2
Shelbourne	1–1	5–0	3–1	3–0	1–2	2–0	1–1	7–0	2–0	—	1–4	2–2
St James's Gate	0–1	1–2	1–1	3–7	1–4	2–2	1–2	1–0	0–4	1–0	—	3–1
Waterford	0–4	3–2	1–3	3–4	1–3	4–0	3–0	4–0	1–1	1–1	3–2	—

Legend: Blue = home team win; Yellow = draw; Red = away team win.

== Top goalscorers ==
Pos	Player	Club	Goals
1	Alexander Hair	Shelbourne	29

== See also ==
- 1930–31 FAI Cup
