= 1924–25 FAI Cup =

Tournament details
- Country: Ireland
- Dates: 3 January – March 17, 1925
- Teams: 12

Final positions
- Champions: Shamrock Rovers (1st title)
- Runners-up: Shelbourne

Tournament statistics
- Matches played: 12
- Goals scored: 46 (3.83 per match)

The FAI Cup 1924–25^{[A]} was the fourth edition of Ireland's premier cup competition, The Football Association of Ireland Challenge Cup or FAI Cup. The tournament began on 3 January 1925 and concluded on 17 March with the final held at Dalymount Park, Dublin. An official attendance^{[B]} of 23,000 people packed the stadium to capacity as record holders Shamrock Rovers defeated Ringsend rivals Shelbourne to claim their first title.

== First round ==
Tie no	Home team	Score	Away team	Date
1	Bohemians	0-2	Shamrock Rovers	3 January 1925
2	Brooklyn	6-2	Jacobs	3 January 1925
3	Shelbourne	3-3	Fordsons	3 January 1925
replay	Fordsons	0-1	Shelbourne	11 January 1925
4	Athlone Town	5-3	Cork Bohemians	10 January 1925

Bye	Pioneers
Bye	Drumcondra
Bye	Bray Unknowns
Bye	St James's Gate

== Second round ==
Tie no	Home team	Score	Away team	Date
1	Bray Unknowns	4-0	Pioneers	17 January 1925
2	Brooklyn	0-4	Shelbourne	17 January 1925
3	Drumcondra	0-2	Athlone Town	17 January 1925
4	St James's Gate	0-1	Shamrock Rovers	17 January 1925

== Semi-finals ==
14 February, 1925

Shelbourne	4–0	Athlone Town
Doran(2); Maguire; Cowzer

Dalymount Park, Dublin

28 February, 1925

Shamrock Rovers	2–1	Bray Unknowns
Flood; Kirkland		Newman(pen)

Shelbourne Park, Dublin

== Final ==
17 March, 1925

Shamrock Rovers	2–1	Shelbourne
Fullam; Flood		Glen(o.g.)

Dalymount Park, Dublin
Attendance: 23,000
Referee: Jack Howcroft (Bradford)

Winner of FAI Cup 1924–25
Shamrock Rovers
1st Title

== Notes ==
A. From 1923 to 1936, the FAI Cup was known as the Free State Cup.

B. Attendances were calculated using gate receipts which limited their accuracy as a large proportion of people, particularly children, attended football matches in Ireland throughout the 20th century for free by a number of means. However, in this instance of a capacity crowd and the closure of the gates fifteen minutes before kick-off, this practice might not have been as common as usual.
