= William Glen (footballer) =

Irish footballer

Personal information
- Full name: William Glen
- Date of birth: 18 July 1903
- Place of birth: Dublin, Ireland
- Date of death: 29 May 1981 (aged 77)
- Place of death: Dublin, Ireland
- Position: Defender

Senior career*
Years	Team	Apps	(Gls)
1922–1937	Shamrock Rovers		(32)
1938–1939	Shelbourne		

International career
1930	League of Ireland XI	2	(0)
1927–1936	Ireland (IFA)	8	(0)
- * Club domestic league appearances and goals

William Glen (18 July 1903 – 29 May 1981) was an Irish footballer.

He joined Shamrock Rovers in their maiden season in League of Ireland football in 1922 and went on to spend fifteen years at Glenmalure Park winning everything the domestic game had to offer.

Sacky played in the official opening of the Milltown ground on the 19 September 1926 against Belfast Celtic F.C.

He played in a record ten FAI Cup finals plus four replays. His first was in 1922 when Rovers lost to St James's Gate F.C. and his last was in the 1939 final replay when he scored the only goal for Shelbourne against Sligo Rovers. Along with Johnny Fullam he shares the record for most winners' medals.

He won eight caps for the Irish Free State making his debut on the 23 April 1927 in Ireland's first ever home game at Lansdowne Road and captaining his country in his last four caps in 1935 and 1936.

He was part of the team that went unbeaten in 1924/25 and 1926/27 and scored a total of 32 league goals for the Hoops. He earned two League of Ireland XI caps in 1930.

Glen had three benefit games in his honour, one of which was at Dalymount Park in May 1937.

== Honours ==
- League of Ireland: 4
  - Shamrock Rovers - 1922–23, 1924–25, 1926–27, 1931–32
- FAI Cup: 8
  - Shamrock Rovers - 1925, 1929, 1930, 1931, 1932, 1933, 1936
  - Shelbourne - 1939
- League of Ireland Shield: 5
  - Shamrock Rovers - 1924/25, 1926/27, 1931/32, 1932/33, 1934/35
- Leinster Senior Cup: 5
  - Shamrock Rovers - 1923, 1927, 1929, 1930, 1933
- Leinster Senior League: 1
  - Shamrock Rovers - 1921–22

== Sources ==
- Paul Doolan, Robert Goggins (1993). The Hoops. Gill & MacmillanLtd. ISBN 0-7171-2121-6.
