= Jack Sullivan (Irish footballer) =

Irish footballer

Personal information
- Full name: John Sullivan
- Place of birth: Cork, Ireland
- Position: Half back

Senior career*
| Years | Team | Apps | (Gls) |
- Fordsons

International career
| 1928 | Ireland | 1 | (1) |
- * Club domestic league appearances and goals

Jack Sullivan was an Ireland international footballer.

== International career ==
In 1928, Sullivan made his only appearance for Ireland scoring a penalty in a 4–2 win over Belgium in Liège.
