= Jack Byrne (1920s footballer) =

Irish footballer

Personal information
- Full name: John Byrne
- Position: Midfielder

Senior career*
Years	Team	Apps	(Gls)
1927–1929	Bray Unknowns		

International career
1928	Irish Free State	1	(0)
- * Club domestic league appearances and goals

John Byrne was an Irish footballer who played as a midfielder and made one appearance for the Irish Free State national team.

== Career ==
Byrne made his first and only international appearance for the Irish Free State on 12 February 1928 in a friendly against Belgium. The away match, which was played at the Stade de Sclessin in Liège, finished as a 4–2 win for Ireland.

== Career statistics ==
=== International ===
Irish Free State
Year	Apps	Goals
1928	1	0
Total	1	0
