= 1937–38 League of Ireland =

League of Ireland
- Season: 1937–38
- Champions: Shamrock Rovers (5th title)
- Matches: 132
- Goals: 603 (4.57 per match)
- Top goalscorer: William Byrne (25 goals)

The 1937–38 League of Ireland was the seventeenth season of the League of Ireland. Sligo Rovers were the defending champions.

Shamrock Rovers won their fifth title.

== Overview ==
Dolphin resigned from the League voluntarily, while Limerick were elected in their place.

== Teams ==
Locations of the 1937–38 League of Ireland teams

Team	Location	Stadium
Bohemians	Dublin (Phibsborough)	Dalymount Park
Bray Unknowns	Bray	Carlisle Grounds
Brideville	Dublin (The Liberties)	Harold's Cross Stadium
Cork	Cork	Mardyke
Drumcondra	Dublin (Clonturk)	Clonturk Park
Dundalk	Dundalk	Oriel Park
Limerick	Limerick	Markets Field
St. James's Gate	Dublin (Crumlin)	St. James's Park
Shamrock Rovers	Dublin (Milltown)	Glenmalure Park
Shelbourne	Dublin (Ringsend)	Shelbourne Park
Sligo Rovers	Sligo	The Showgrounds
Waterford	Waterford	Kilcohan Park

== Table ==
Pos	Team	Pld	W	D	L	GF	GA	GD	Pts
1	Shamrock Rovers	22	14	4	4	71	47	+24	32
2	Waterford	22	13	5	4	76	40	+36	31
3	Dundalk	22	13	4	5	53	29	+24	30
4	Brideville	22	12	5	5	51	35	+16	29
5	St James's Gate	22	13	1	8	65	40	+25	27
6	Sligo Rovers	22	7	5	10	55	61	−6	19
7	Shelbourne	22	6	6	10	36	47	−11	18
8	Bray Unknowns	22	8	2	12	37	56	−19	18
9	Bohemians	22	7	3	12	55	60	−5	17
10	Limerick	22	6	5	11	34	43	−9	17
11	Cork	22	6	1	15	38	78	−40	13
12	Drumcondra	22	5	3	14	32	67	−35	13

Source: www.rsssf.com

== Results ==
Home \ Away	BOH	BRY	BRI	CFC	DRU	DUN	LIM	SHM	SHE	SLI	STG	WAT
Bohemians	—	4–3	2–3	2–0	6–1	2–2	3–2	2–3	2–4	5–1	1–3	2–3
Bray Unknowns	4–3	—	0–4	5–1	2–1	3–2	2–0	1–3	0–3	1–5	3–1	1–0
Brideville	4–2	3–0	—	4–1	0–0	0–0	3–1	2–2	3–0	3–2	3–1	3–1
Cork	2–7	4–1	1–2	—	1–0	0–3	3–2	2–3	5–4	5–5	3–8	1–8
Drumcondra	1–4	3–2	3–2	0–1	—	0–2	2–2	4–5	1–1	3–0	2–0	1–4
Dundalk	1–1	0–0	2–1	3–1	5–2	—	4–0	4–0	3–1	4–0	3–4	4–1
Limerick	2–1	4–2	1–1	3–0	3–0	0–1	—	0–3	3–0	1–1	2–1	0–3
Shamrock Rovers	6–1	2–4	2–2	3–0	8–1	1–5	1–0	—	3–1	3–1	2–1	6–1
Shelbourne	2–1	3–1	2–1	2–3	3–2	0–1	0–0	5–5	—	1–1	0–2	2–2
Sligo Rovers	6–1	2–2	1–3	4–1	7–1	4–2	5–3	4–7	1–0	—	1–2	1–1
St James's Gate	5–1	5–0	4–1	5–2	1–4	5–0	3–1	4–1	1–1	7–1	—	0–4
Waterford	2–2	3–0	7–3	4–1	8–0	3–2	4–4	2–2	6–1	5–2	4–2	—

Legend: Blue = home team win; Yellow = draw; Red = away team win.

== Top goalscorers ==
Pos	Player	Club	Goals
1	William Byrne	St James's Gate	25
