= Bill Harrington (Irish footballer) =

Irish footballer

Personal information
- Full name: William Harrington
- Date of birth: 10 September 1913
- Place of birth: Queenstown, County Cork
- Date of death: 10 July 1996 (aged 82)
- Place of death: Cobh, County Cork
- Position: Goalkeeper

Senior career*
Years	Team	Apps	(Gls)
1935–1938	Cork		
1938–1939	Cork City		

International career
1935–1938	Ireland (FAI)	5	(0)
- * Club domestic league appearances and goals

William Harrington, commonly known as Bill Harrington, was an Irish footballer who played as a goalkeeper and made five appearances for the FAI-organised Ireland national team.

== Career ==
Harrington made his international debut for the Irish Free State on 8 December 1935 in a friendly match against the Netherlands, which finished as a 3–5 loss. He went on to make five appearances for the team, earning his final cap on 22 May 1938 against Poland as a 69th-minute substitute for George McKenzie, which finished as a 0–6 loss.

== Career statistics ==
=== International ===
Ireland (FAI)
Year	Apps	Goals
1935	1	0
1936	3	0
1938	1	0
Total	5	0
