= 1929–30 League of Ireland =

League of Ireland
- Season: 1929–30
- Champions: Bohemians (3rd title)
- Matches played: 90
- Goals scored: 372 (4.13 per match)
- Top goalscorer: Johnny Ledwidge (16 goals)

The 1929–30 League of Ireland was the ninth season of the League of Ireland. Shelbourne were the defending champions.

Bohemians won their third title.

== Overview ==
No new teams were elected to the League.

== Teams ==
Locations of the 1928–29 League of Ireland teams

Team	Location	Stadium
Bohemians	Dublin (Phibsborough)	Dalymount Park
Bray Unknowns	Bray	Woodbrook Ground
Brideville	Dublin (The Liberties)	Richmond Park
Drumcondra	Dublin (Clonturk)	Clonturk Park
Dundalk GNR	Dundalk	Athletic Grounds
Fordsons	Cork	Ballinlough Road
Jacobs	Dublin (Crumlin)	Rutland Avenue
St. James's Gate	Dublin (Crumlin)	St. James's Park
Shamrock Rovers	Dublin (Milltown)	Glenmalure Park
Shelbourne	Dublin (Ringsend)	Shelbourne Park

== Table ==
Pos	Team	Pld	W	D	L	GF	GA	GD	Pts
1	Bohemians	18	14	2	2	51	18	+33	30
2	Shelbourne	18	14	1	3	59	25	+34	29
3	Shamrock Rovers	18	12	2	4	44	22	+22	26
4	Fordsons	18	8	3	7	33	33	0	19
5	Brideville	18	8	3	7	34	39	−5	19
6	Dundalk GNR	18	6	3	9	38	36	+2	15
7	Drumcondra	18	5	5	8	26	37	−11	15
8	Bray Unknowns	18	4	5	9	34	48	−14	13
9	St James's Gate	18	4	3	11	30	38	−8	11
10	Jacobs	18	0	3	15	23	76	−53	3

Source: www.rsssf.com, webalice.it

== Results ==
Home \ Away	BOH	BRY	BRI	FOR	DRU	DUN	JAC	SHM	SHE	STG
Bohemians	—	3–0	3–1	5–0	4–1	2–1	4–3	5–1	2–1	2–0
Bray Unknowns	0–1	—	3–1	3–3	3–3	2–2	5–1	0–1	1–3	4–1
Brideville	0–0	3–2	—	1–0	1–2	3–2	3–1	2–2	1–6	2–1
Fordsons	3–1	1–1	3–1	—	2–0	0–1	4–1	1–1	2–1	1–2
Drumcondra	3–3	4–2	3–0	0–1	—	0–4	1–1	0–4	1–4	3–0
Dundalk GNR	1–3	3–0	3–3	2–3	1–1	—	2–1	0–2	2–4	3–2
Jacobs	1–8	3–3	2–4	2–7	0–1	2–8	—	1–3	2–3	0–8
Shamrock Rovers	0–1	7–1	2–3	4–1	2–0	2–1	3–1	—	2–3	1–0
Shelbourne	2–0	6–0	4–3	4–1	3–1	1–0	9–1	1–3	—	0–0
St James's Gate	0–4	2–4	0–2	3–0	2–2	5–2	0–0	1–4	3–4	—

Legend: Blue = home team win; Yellow = draw; Red = away team win.

== Top goalscorers ==
Pos	Player	Club	Goals
1	Johnny Ledwidge	Shelbourne	16

== See also ==
- 1929–30 FAI Cup
