= Alex Hair =

Scottish footballer (1898–1970)

Personal information
- Full name: Alexander Hair
- Date of birth: 9 March 1898
- Place of birth: Glasgow, Scotland
- Date of death: 31 May 1970 (aged 72)
- Place of death: Bishopbriggs, Scotland
- Height: 5 ft 6 in (1.68 m)
- Position: Centre forward

Senior career*
Years	Team	Apps	(Gls)
–	Strathclyde		
1923–1928	Partick Thistle	91	(78)
1924–1925	→ Queen of the South (loan)	19	(19)
1925–1926	→ Third Lanark (loan)	5	(2)
1926	→ Alloa Athletic (loan)	15	(17)
1926	→ Bo'ness (loan)		
1928–1930	Preston North End	45	(20)
1930–1931	Shelbourne	22	(29)
1931–1932	Colwyn Bay United		
1932–1934	Worcester City		
1934–1935	Burton Town		

Managerial career
- 1932–1934: Worcester City
- 1935–1936: Shirley Town
- * Club domestic league appearances and goals

Alexander Hair (9 March 1898 – 31 May 1970) was a Scottish footballer who played as a centre forward.

== Career ==
Born in Glasgow and nicknamed 'Sandy', he joined Partick Thistle in 1923 from local Junior club Strathclyde, where he had become a prolific goalscorer. By that time he was 25 years of age, relatively old to join a senior club; however, many sources record his birth date as 9 March 1902, and contemporary documents also show a younger age than he truly was, suggesting the player himself may have been aware of this inaccuracy. After loan spells in lower divisions at Queen of the South, Third Lanark, Alloa Athletic and Bo'ness he established himself with the Jags, scoring 41 goals in 36 Scottish Football League appearances during the 1926–27 season (however, Jimmy McGrory of Celtic scored 48 to claim the top scorer award – neither Partick nor Celtic challenged for the league title), plus another five goals in a Glasgow Merchants Charity Cup final victory against Rangers at the end of that campaign.

Hair joined Preston North End for the 1928–29 season for a £2,200 transfer fee. He scored 19 goals in his first season at Deepdale, but lost his first-team place and was put on the 'open to transfer' list, meaning a new club within Britain would have to pay Preston's desired fee of £1000. To bypass this restriction, Hair moved to Irish football, where the British transfer regulations did not apply. During the 1930–31 season, he set the record for most league goals scored by a Shelbourne player in one season with a tally of twenty-nine in just twenty-two matches. This prolific scoring helped Shelbourne win their third League of Ireland title.

Hair returned to Britain to play for Colwyn Bay United of the Birmingham and District League, and then served Worcester City as player-manager, Burton Town as a player and Shirley Town as manager. He later worked as an engineer in Scotland, including at Sir William Arrol & Co.

== Honours ==
Partick Thistle

- Glasgow Merchants Charity Cup: 1926–27

Individual

- League of Ireland Top Scorer: 1930–31
