= Tim O'Keefe =

Irish footballer

Personal information
- Full name: Timothy James O'Keefe
- Date of birth: 1910
- Place of birth: Cork, Ireland
- Date of death: 11 September 1943
- Place of death: Cork, Ireland
- Position: Outside forward

Senior career*
Years	Team	Apps	(Gls)
1930–1936	Cork		
1936–1938	Waterford United		
1938–1939	Hibernian	4	(0)
1938–1939	→ Raith Rovers (loan)		
1939–1941	Waterford United		
1942	Limerick		
1942–43	Cork United		

International career
1934–1938	Republic of Ireland	3	(0)
- * Club domestic league appearances and goals

Timothy James O'Keefe (or O'Keeffe) (1910 – 1943) was a Republic of Ireland international footballer. Born in Cork O'Keefe began his career with Cork F.C. in 1930 before moving to Waterford in 1936. During his time with Waterford he became an integral part of the team that won the FAI Cup in 1937, scoring in every round, including the winning goal in the final against St James's Gate.

O'Keefe was capped three times for the Republic of Ireland at senior level. His debut was in a 4–4 home draw with Belgium in 1934. He also won caps against Czechoslovakia and Poland in 1938.

O'Keefe died at age 33 in the Bon Secours hospital in Cork; his death was caused by cancer.
