= John Blair (footballer, born 1905) =

Scottish footballer

Personal information
- Full name: John Guthrie Blair
- Date of birth: 23 August 1905
- Place of birth: Neilston, Scotland
- Date of death: 1974 (aged 68–69)
- Position: Inside right

Youth career
- Neilston Victoria

Senior career*
Years	Team	Apps	(Gls)
1923–1926	Third Lanark	78	(34)
1926–1927	Tottenham Hotspur	29	(14)
1927–1928	Sheffield United	26	(7)
	Fordsons	?	(?)
- * Club domestic league appearances and goals

John Guthrie Blair (23 August 1905 – 1974) was a Scottish professional footballer who played for Third Lanark, Tottenham Hotspur and Sheffield United.

== Football career ==
Blair began his professional career at Third Lanark before joining Tottenham Hotspur.

He scored on his Lilywhites debut in a 2–1 victory over Everton at White Hart Lane in August 1926 in the old First Division. He played a total of 30 matches and scored 14 goals in all competitions for the Spurs between 1926 and 1927.

Blair left London and signed for Sheffield United, where he went on to feature in a further 26 matches and netting seven goals between 1927 and 1928.

He ended his playing career at Irish club Fordsons.
