= Frank McLoughlin (footballer) =

Irish footballer

Personal information
- Full name: Francis McLaughlin
- Date of birth: 13 November 1905
- Place of birth: Derry, Northern Ireland
- Date of death: 6 July 1979 (aged 73)
- Place of death: Derry, Northern Ireland
- Position: Midfielder

Senior career*
| Years | Team | Apps | (Gls) |
| –1930 | Fordsons | | |
| 1930– | Cork | | |

International career
| 1930–1931 | Ireland (FAI) | 2 | (0) |
- * Club domestic league appearances and goals

Frank McLoughlin was an Irish footballer who played as a midfielder for Fordsons F.C. and its successor Cork F.C.

He was also capped twice for the Irish Free State national team, which became known as the Republic of Ireland in 1953. He made his international debut in 1930, with a 3–1 win over Belgium. His second cap came in 1931 at Dalymount Park against Spain but ended in a 5–0 loss.

McLoughlin died suddenly on 6 July 1979, aged 73.
