= Paddy Barry (footballer) =

Irish footballer

Personal information
- Full name: Patrick Barry
- Position: Half back

Senior career*
Years	Team	Apps	(Gls)
- Fordsons

International career
1928–1929	Ireland	2	(0)
- * Club domestic league appearances and goals

Paddy Barry was an Ireland international footballer.

== International career ==
In February 1928, Barry made his first appearance for Ireland in a 4–2 win over Belgium in Liège.
