= 1928–29 League of Ireland =

League of Ireland
- Season: 1928–29
- Champions: Shelbourne (2nd title)
- Matches: 90
- Goals: 381 (4.23 per match)
- Top goalscorer: Eddie Carroll (17 goals)

The 1928–29 League of Ireland was the eighth season of the League of Ireland. Bohemians were the defending champions.

Shelbourne won their second title.

== Overview ==
Athlone Town were not re-elected to the League, while Drumcondra were elected.

Newly elected Drumcondra hosted Shamrock Rovers at Richmond Road, later known as Tolka Park, on the opening day of the season, 26 August 1928.

In 1929, over 30 people were injured at the ground when a hoarding collapsed at a Leinster Senior Cup tie between Drumcondra and Shelbourne.

== Teams ==
=== Changes from 1927-28 season ===
Elected	Not Re-elected
Drumcondra	Athlone Town

Locations of the 1928–29 League of Ireland teams

Team	Location	Stadium
Bohemians	Dublin (Phibsborough)	Dalymount Park
Bray Unknowns	Bray	Woodbrook Ground
Brideville	Dublin (The Liberties)	Richmond Park
Drumcondra	Dublin (Clonturk)	Clonturk Park
Dundalk GNR	Dundalk	Athletic Grounds
Fordsons	Cork	Ballinlough Road
Jacobs	Dublin (Crumlin)	Rutland Avenue
St. James's Gate	Dublin (Crumlin)	St. James's Park
Shamrock Rovers	Dublin (Milltown)	Glenmalure Park
Shelbourne	Dublin (Ringsend)	Shelbourne Park

== Table ==
Pos	Team	Pld	W	D	L	GF	GA	GD	Pts
1	Shelbourne	18	16	1	1	49	12	+37	33
2	Bohemians	18	15	2	1	61	23	+38	32
3	Shamrock Rovers	18	10	4	4	58	28	+30	24
4	Drumcondra	18	7	4	7	28	31	−3	18
5	Dundalk GNR	18	7	3	8	43	44	−1	17
6	St James's Gate	18	5	4	9	37	44	−7	14
7	Fordsons	18	5	3	10	27	36	−9	13
8	Brideville	18	4	3	11	28	57	−29	11
9	Jacobs	18	2	6	10	26	48	−22	10
10	Bray Unknowns	18	2	4	12	24	58	−34	8

Source: www.rsssf.com, webalice.it

== Results ==
Home \ Away	BOH	BRY	BRI	FOR	DRU	DUN	JAC	SHM	SHE	STG
Bohemians	—	6–2	3–0	5–2	3–2	6–0	6–1	2–1	2–1	2–2
Bray Unknowns	1–2	—	2–4	0–1	0–3	0–3	4–4	1–1	1–2	1–4
Brideville	2–6	2–2	—	3–2	0–3	1–3	1–1	1–4	0–4	3–9
Fordsons	0–3	1–3	3–0	—	1–2	1–1	0–0	1–2	0–1	5–1
Drumcondra	0–1	2–2	2–5	3–2	—	2–1	5–1	1–1	0–1	0–0
Dundalk GNR	1–2	5–1	4–2	3–3	3–0	—	5–1	2–2	1–4	3–2
Jacobs	3–7	3–0	0–0	1–2	0–0	4–3	—	2–3	1–2	2–2
Shamrock Rovers	2–2	11–0	4–2	6–1	4–0	5–2	3–1	—	2–4	3–4
Shelbourne	3–1	3–1	4–0	1–0	4–0	4–1	3–0	2–0	—	4–0
St James's Gate	0–2	1–3	1–2	1–2	2–3	4–2	2–1	0–4	2–2	—

Legend: Blue = home team win; Yellow = draw; Red = away team win.

== Top goalscorers ==
Pos	Player	Club	Goals
1	Eddie Carroll	Dundalk GNR	17

== See also ==
- 1928–29 FAI Cup
