= 1933–34 FAI Cup =

1933-34 FAI Cup
Tournament details
- Country: Ireland
- Dates: 13 January-17 March 1934
- Teams: 16

Final positions
- Champions: Cork F.C. (1st title)
- Runners-up: St James's Gate FC

Tournament statistics
- Matches played: 23
- Goals scored: 70 (3.04 per match)

The FAI Cup 1933–34^{[A]} was the thirteenth awarding of Ireland's premier cup competition prize, The Football Association of Ireland Challenge Cup or FAI Cup. The tournament began on 13 January 1934 and concluded on 17 March with the final held at Dalymount Park, Dublin. An official attendance^{[B]} of 21,000 people watched Cork claim their sole FAI Cup title by defeating inaugural winners, St James's Gate.

== First round ==
Tie no	Home team	Score	Away team	Date
1	Drumcondra	1-1	Shelbourne	13 January 1934
replay	Shelbourne	2-5	Drumcondra	17 January 1934
2	Jacobs	0-5	Dolphin	13 January 1934
3	Bohemians	9-0	Tramore Rookies	14 January 1934
4	Cork Bohemians	1-1	Cork	14 January 1934
replay	Cork	3-1	Cork Bohemians	17 January 1934
5	Dundalk	4-0	Sligo Rovers	14 January 1934
6	St James's Gate	1-1	Shamrock Rovers	14 January 1934
replay	Shamrock Rovers	1-2	St James's Gate	24 January 1934
7	Waterford	0-3	Bray Unknowns	14 January 1934
8	Queen's Park	2-2	Brideville	21 January 1934
replay	Brideville	0-2	Queen's Park	24 January 1934

== Second round ==
Tie no	Home team	Score	Away team	Date
1	Dundalk	1-0	Bohemians	27 January 1934
2	Queen's Park	1-1	Dolphin	27 January 1934
replay	Dolphin	1-0	Queen's Park	31 January 1934
3	Cork	1-1	Bray Unknowns	28 January 1934
replay	Bray Unknowns	0-2	Cork	31 January 1934
4	Drumcondra	0-2	St James's Gate	28 January 1934

== Semi-finals ==
10 February, 1934

St James's Gate	1–0	Dolphin
Kennedy

Shelbourne Park, Dublin

11 February, 1934

Cork	2–2	Dundalk
Haddow; O'Keeffe		Atkins; Delea

Dalymount Park, Dublin

=== Replay ===
4 March, 1934

Cork	1–1	Dundalk
Kelso		McCourt

Dalymount Park, Dublin

=== Replay(2) ===
7 March, 1934

Cork	2–1	Dundalk
Paton(pen); Kelso		Carroll

Glenmalure Park, Milltown, Dublin

== Final ==
17 March, 1934

Cork	2–1	St James's Gate
O'Keeffe 28'; Kelso 49'		Comerford 19'

Dalymount Park, Dublin
Attendance: 21,000

Winner of FAI Cup 1933–34
Cork
1st Title

== Notes ==
A. From 1923 to 1936, the FAI Cup was known as the Free State Cup.

B. Attendances were calculated using gate receipts which limited their accuracy as a large proportion of people, particularly children, attended football matches in Ireland throughout the 20th century for free by a number of means.
