= Brian Bourke =

Irish artist

- Born: 1936 (age 89–90); Dublin, Ireland
- Known for: Landscape artist, self-portrait artist

Brian Bourke (born 1936 in Dublin) is an Irish artist.

== Life ==
Bourke was born in Dublin in 1936. His parents were Thomas Bourke (Tómas de Búrca) and Eileen (Eibhlín) Bourke (née Somers). Bourke left school early and got a job in the art department of the Player Wills tobacco company on the condition he enrolled at the National College of Art and Design (NCAD). He later studied at Saint Martin's School of Art in London. After London, he spent time in Germany and was strongly influence by the Neue Sachlichkeit art movement. He returned to Dublin in 1957 and held his first one-man show in Dublin in 1964 at the Dawson Gallery. He travelled across Europe in the 1960s and 1970s.

In 1965 Bourke won an Arts Council prize for portraiture and represented Ireland at the Biennale de Paris. He won the Munster and Leinster Bank competition in 1966, and first prize in the Irish Exhibition of Living Art competition in 1967. He was included in the Delighted Eye, the Hibernian landscape and the Cork Rosc exhibitions in 1980.

In 1985, he was named Sunday Independent Artist of the Year, and he received the O'Malley Award from the Irish-American Cultural Institute in 1993. A retrospective of his work was exhibited as part of the Galway Arts Festival in 1988.

In 1991, he was artist-in-residence at the Gate Theatre's Beckett Festival in Dublin, with accompanying works appearing at the Douglas Hyde Gallery.

In 2001, a large exhibition of his portraits of women, centred on portraits of his son's adopted daughter, appeared at the Dyehouse Gallery in Waterford. He lives in Connemara, County Galway. Bourke held another retrospective exhibition in the Claremorris Gallery in 2022. He is a member of the Aosdána and an honorary member of the Royal Hibernian Academy.

Bourke's brother was the photographer Fergus Bourke. Bourke has married twice, first to Ann, a lecturer at NCAD, and secondly to Jay Murphy, also an artist.
