= The Dawn (film) =

1936 film by Tom Cooper

- Handpainted poster from County Donegal
- Directed by: Tom Cooper
- Written by: Tom Cooper; D.A. Moriarty; Donal O'Cahill
- Produced by: Tom Cooper
- Starring: Tom Cooper; Donal O'Cahill; Eileen Davis; Brian O'Sullivan; James Gleeson; Gerry O'Mahony; Bill Murphy; Marion O'Connell
- Music by: Pat Crowley's Dance Band
- Production company: Hibernia Pictures
- Release date: 19 January 1936
- Running time: 89 minutes
- Country: Irish Free State
- Language: English

The Dawn is a 1936 Irish film directed and produced by Tom Cooper, who also co-wrote and acted in the film. Set during the Irish War of Independence, it was the first indigenous sound production produced during the Irish Free State period. It was released in the United States under the title Dawn Over Ireland.

== Production ==
The Dawn was filmed by Killarney garage owner Tom Cooper in 1934 and 1935. The cast comprised 250 amateur actors from the local area, many of them Irish Republican Army veterans.

== Plot ==
In 1866, in the runup to the Fenian Rising, Brian Malone was falsely denounced as an informer. In 1919, his grandson of the same name aims to clear the family name by serving in the IRA.

== Reception ==
The Irish Times correspondent wrote, "The Dawn, in spite of various crudities, is as thrilling a show as ever I want to witness, and its amateur cast gives it a freshness which is all too rare." It was contrasted with Ourselves Alone, which had portrayed "clean-limbed police" with the IRA men shown as "tough hombres"; The Dawn, on the other hand, depicted the Black and Tans as "too scoundrelly for words" and was liable to make Unionist viewers squirm.

Cooper received an award from Cork Film Festival in the late 1970s.

An original 35 mm print is stored in the British Film Institute; it was digitised and restored in 2016. Prints are also held by RTÉ and the Irish Film Institute.
