= Owen Kinsella =

Irish footballer

Owen Kinsella was an Irish footballer who played as a half back.

== Career ==
He joined Shamrock Rovers in 1930 from Fordsons. He left for St James's Gate F.C. in 1938 and in 1939 moved to Limerick F.C. .

Kinsella earned two international caps for the Irish Free State making his debut on 8 May 1932 in a 2–0 friendly win over the Netherlands in the Olympic Stadium (Amsterdam). His second cap came five years later in a World Cup qualifier defeat to Norway in the Ullevaal Stadion on the 10 October 1937.

== Sources ==
- Paul Doolan; Robert Goggins. The Hoops. ISBN 0-7171-2121-6.
- Owen Kinsella at WorldFootball.net
