= 1936–37 League of Ireland =

League of Ireland
- Season: 1936–37
- Champions: Sligo Rovers (1st title)
- Matches: 132
- Goals: 571 (4.33 per match)
- Top goalscorer: Bob Sclater (20 goals)

The 1936–37 League of Ireland was the sixteenth season of the League of Ireland. Bohemians were the defending champions.

Sligo Rovers won their first title, becoming the first team from Connacht to do so.

== Overview ==
Reds United withdrew from the League voluntarily, with Shelbourne taking their place.

== Teams ==
Locations of the 1936–37 League of Ireland teams

Team	Location	Stadium
Bohemians	Dublin (Phibsborough)	Dalymount Park
Bray Unknowns	Bray	Carlisle Grounds
Brideville	Dublin (The Liberties)	Harold's Cross Stadium
Cork	Cork	Mardyke
Dolphin	Dublin (Dolphin's Barn)	Dolphin Park
Drumcondra	Dublin (Clonturk)	Clonturk Park
Dundalk	Dundalk	Oriel Park
St. James's Gate	Dublin (Crumlin)	St. James's Park
Shamrock Rovers	Dublin (Milltown)	Glenmalure Park
Shelbourne	Dublin (Ringsend)	Shelbourne Park
Sligo Rovers	Sligo	The Showgrounds
Waterford	Waterford	Kilcohan Park

== Table ==
Pos	Team	Pld	W	D	L	GF	GA	GD	Pts
1	Sligo Rovers	22	16	2	4	68	30	+38	34
2	Dundalk (Note: Dundalk finished runners-up on goal average)	22	10	4	8	41	34	+7	24
3	Waterford	22	12	0	10	59	49	+10	24
4	Bray Unknowns	22	10	4	8	30	39	−9	24
5	St James's Gate	22	9	5	8	63	43	+20	23
6	Drumcondra	22	10	3	9	41	47	−6	23
7	Bohemians	22	10	2	10	54	56	−2	22
8	Shelbourne	22	9	3	10	53	48	+5	21
9	Shamrock Rovers	22	8	3	11	46	55	−9	19
10	Dolphin	22	7	4	11	33	59	−26	18
11	Cork	22	7	3	12	51	60	−9	17
12	Brideville	22	6	3	13	32	51	−19	15

Source: www.rsssf.com

== Results ==
Home \ Away	BOH	BRY	BRI	CFC	DOL	DRU	DUN	SHM	SHE	SLI	STG	WAT
Bohemians	—	4–0	2–0	1–4	5–2	3–2	2–1	2–5	2–2	3–4	1–0	3–1
Bray Unknowns	3–3	—	2–0	3–1	1–0	0–1	1–3	0–0	2–1	0–5	0–0	2–1
Brideville	2–4	0–1	—	2–3	3–4	2–1	1–2	2–0	2–0	2–1	2–2	2–4
Cork	4–2	1–2	3–3	—	8–2	1–2	2–2	3–2	1–1	3–4	1–0	2–3
Dolphin	2–5	1–4	1–0	2–0	—	3–4	2–0	2–2	2–1	1–1	3–3	2–3
Drumcondra	3–2	2–2	1–1	3–1	0–0	—	2–0	3–2	2–5	1–3	0–2	1–4
Dundalk	3–2	2–0	4–2	7–2	0–1	3–1	—	3–1	2–2	1–1	2–2	2–0
Shamrock Rovers	3–0	1–3	0–1	4–2	4–0	4–2	4–1	—	3–2	1–6	4–4	1–3
Shelbourne	3–1	4–1	0–2	6–2	2–0	5–2	2–1	5–2	—	0–2	1–2	7–1
Sligo Rovers	1–2	3–0	4–1	3–2	9–0	2–3	2–0	2–0	2–0	—	4–2	3–0
St James's Gate	7–2	6–1	6–0	3–4	4–2	1–3	0–2	7–0	6–2	0–4	—	2–3
Waterford	4–3	0–2	6–2	3–1	0–1	1–2	2–0	2–3	8–2	8–2	2–4	—

Legend: Blue = home team win; Yellow = draw; Red = away team win.

== Top goalscorers ==
Pos	Player	Club	Goals
1	Bob Sclater (Note: Bob Sclater also scored one goal for Waterford.)	Shelbourne; Waterford	20

== See also ==
- 1936–37 FAI Cup
