= League of Ireland Shield =

Irish football tournament

The League of Ireland Shield is a defunct Irish football tournament which was introduced when the League of Ireland (LOI) started in 1921 and ran uninterrupted until 1972. It was played before the league season began and was seen as the third most important trophy in Irish football, after the league and the FAI Cup. The winners of the Shield gained entry to the following season's Inter-Cities Fairs Cup until 1971–72.

The competition was played in a variety of formats; from complete round robin series to group stages followed by knock out games to complete knock out tournaments. It was usually staged as a full round of games with all teams playing each other once, such as in 1948–49 and 1966–67. On a couple of occasions the Shield ran for two rounds, the same as the league championship. The Shield was replaced by the League of Ireland Cup in 1973, although the competition returned for one season in 1983–84.

The LOI Shield should not be confused with the League of Ireland First Division Shield, a competition that ran in the 1980s and 1990s and, as the name suggests, was confined to First Division clubs.

== List of winners ==
Season	Winner	Score	Runner-up	Venue
1921–22	Shelbourne		Bohemians	
1922–23	Shelbourne	2–1	Athlone Town	
1923–24	Bohemians	2–1	Shelbourne	
1924–25	Shamrock Rovers		Bohemians	

- 1921–22: Shelbourne
- 1922–23: Shelbourne
- 1923–24: Bohemian
- 1924–25: Shamrock Rovers
- 1925–26: Shelbourne
- 1926–27: Shamrock Rovers
- 1927–28: Bohemian
- 1928–29: Bohemian
- 1929–30: Shelbourne
- 1930–31: Waterford
- 1931–32: Shamrock Rovers
- 1932–33: Shamrock Rovers
- 1933–34: Bohemian
- 1934–35: Shamrock Rovers
- 1935–36: St. James' Gate
- 1936–37: Waterford
- 1937–38: Shamrock Rovers
- 1938–39: Bohemian
- 1939–40: Bohemian
- 1940–41: St. James' Gate
- 1941–42: Shamrock Rovers
- 1942–43: Cork United
- 1943–44: Shelbourne
- 1944–45: Shelbourne
- 1945–46: Drumcondra
- 1946–47: Drumcondra
- 1947–48: Cork United
- 1948–49: Shelbourne
- 1949–50 : Shamrock Rovers
- 1950–51: Drumcondra
- 1951–52 : Shamrock Rovers
- 1952–53: Waterford
- 1953–54: Limerick
- 1954–55: Shamrock Rovers
- 1955–56: Shamrock Rovers
- 1956–57: Shamrock Rovers
- 1957–58: Shamrock Rovers
- 1958–59: Waterford
- 1959–60: St Patricks Athletic
- 1960–61: Cork Celtic
- 1961–62: Drumcondra
- 1962–63: Shamrock Rovers
- 1963–64: Shamrock Rovers
- 1964–65: Shamrock Rovers
- 1965–66: Shamrock Rovers
- 1966–67: Dundalk
- 1967–68: Shamrock Rovers
- 1968–69: Waterford
- 1969–70: Cork Hibernians
- 1970–71: Shelbourne
- 1971–72: Dundalk
- 1972–73: Cork Hibernians
- 1983–84: Limerick City

== Performance by club ==
Club	Winners	Runners-up	Winning seasons
Shamrock Rovers	18	9	1924–25, 1926–27, 1931–32, 1932–33, 1934–35, 1937–38, 1941–42, 1949–50, 1951–52, 1954–55, 1955-56, 1956–57, 1957–58, 1962–63, 1963-64, 1964–65, 1965–66, 1967–68
Shelbourne	8	5	1921–22, 1922–23, 1925–26, 1929–30, 1943–44, 1944–45, 1948–49, 1970–71
Bohemians	6	5	1923–24, 1927–28, 1928–29, 1933–34, 1938–39, 1939–40
Waterford	5	2	1930–31, 1936–37, 1952–53, 1958–59, 1968–69
Drumcondra	4	5	1945–46, 1946–47, 1950–51, 1961–62
Dundalk	2	6	1966–67, 1971–72
Cork Hibernians	2	2	1969–70, 1972–73
Limerick	2	2	1953–54, 1983-84
Cork United	2	1	1942–43, 1947–48
St. James' Gate	2	–	1935–36, 1940–41
Cork Celtic	1	3	1960–61
St. Patrick's Athletic	1	2	1959–60
Transport	–	3	–
Athlone Town	–	2	–
Bray Unknowns F.C.	–	1	–
Cork F.C.	–	1	–
Dolphin F.C.	–	1	–
Drogheda United	–	1	–
Sligo Rovers	–	1	–
UCD	–	1	–

== See also ==
- League of Ireland
- FAI Cup
- League of Ireland Cup
