= 1931–32 League of Ireland =

League of Ireland
- Season: 1931–32
- Champions: Shamrock Rovers (4th title)
- Matches played: 132
- Goals scored: 545 (4.13 per match)
- Top goalscorer: Pearson Ferguson; Jack Forster (21 goals each)

The 1931–32 League of Ireland was the eleventh season of the League of Ireland.

Shamrock Rovers won their fourth title.

== Overview ==
No new teams were elected to the League.

Locations of the 1931–32 League of Ireland teams

== Teams ==
Team	Location	Stadium
Bohemians	Dublin (Phibsborough)	Dalymount Park
Bray Unknowns	Bray	Woodbrook Ground
Brideville	Dublin (The Liberties)	Richmond Park
Cork	Cork	Mardyke
Dolphin	Dublin (Dolphin's Barn)	Dolphin Park
Drumcondra	Dublin (Clonturk)	Clonturk Park
Dundalk	Dundalk	Athletic Grounds
Jacobs	Dublin (Crumlin)	Rutland Avenue
St. James's Gate	Dublin (Crumlin)	St. James's Park
Shamrock Rovers	Dublin (Milltown)	Glenmalure Park
Shelbourne	Dublin (Ringsend)	Shelbourne Park
Waterford	Waterford	Kilcohan Park

== Table ==
Pos	Team	Pld	W	D	L	GF	GA	GD	Pts
1	Shamrock Rovers	22	13	6	3	70	34	+36	32
2	Cork	22	10	9	3	57	27	+30	29
3	Waterford	22	12	4	6	64	42	+22	28
4	Dundalk	22	11	5	6	56	31	+25	27
5	Bohemians	22	12	3	7	43	35	+8	27
6	Shelbourne	22	10	6	6	43	34	+9	26
7	Dolphin	22	11	3	8	65	44	+21	25
8	Bray Unknowns	22	9	5	8	45	51	−6	23
9	Drumcondra	22	6	5	11	33	48	−15	17
10	Brideville	22	6	3	13	27	47	−20	15
11	St James's Gate	22	4	2	16	27	62	−35	10
12	Jacobs	22	1	3	18	15	90	−75	5

Source: www.rsssf.com

== Results ==
Home \ Away	BOH	BRY	BRI	CFC	DOL	DRU	DUN	JAC	SHM	SHE	STG	WAT
Bohemians	—	1–1	5–1	1–0	3–2	2–3	3–2	5–1	2–3	2–1	3–2	0–1
Bray Unknowns	1–0	—	3–2	2–2	4–8	3–1	2–2	1–1	2–2	3–1	5–1	3–4
Brideville	1–2	1–2	—	1–1	3–1	1–1	2–1	3–0	1–5	3–5	1–0	1–0
Cork	1–2	6–2	4–0	—	1–1	2–0	1–1	7–0	2–2	1–0	4–1	2–2
Dolphin	2–1	3–1	3–0	3–3	—	4–1	2–4	6–0	0–1	1–1	3–2	2–4
Drumcondra	1–1	2–1	1–1	3–2	0–6	—	2–4	2–1	0–0	1–3	3–1	3–4
Dundalk	1–1	5–0	3–2	0–2	2–1	2–1	—	9–0	5–2	2–2	2–0	3–3
Jacobs	1–2	1–2	2–1	0–6	1–6	0–1	0–5	—	0–8	1–1	1–4	2–3
Shamrock Rovers	2–0	4–0	4–0	2–2	3–4	3–2	1–2	3–0	—	4–3	3–0	8–2
Shelbourne	2–4	2–0	1–0	0–2	3–2	1–1	2–1	4–0	2–2	—	4–1	1–0
St James's Gate	1–3	1–5	0–1	1–1	1–4	4–3	1–0	2–2	1–4	2–3	—	1–0
Waterford	5–0	1–2	3–1	3–5	5–1	2–1	1–0	9–1	4–4	1–1	7–0	—

Legend: Blue = home team win; Yellow = draw; Red = away team win.

== Top goalscorers ==
Pos	Player	Club	Goals
1	Pearson Ferguson	Cork	21
1	Jack Forster	Waterford	21

== See also ==
- 1931–32 FAI Cup
