= Dolphin F.C. (Ireland) =

Irish association football club

Dolphin
- Full name: Dolphin Football Club
- Nickname: Dolphins
- Founded: 1921
- Dissolved: 1930s
- Ground: Dolphin Park; Harold's Cross Stadium; Tolka Park
- League: League of Ireland; Leinster Senior League
Home colours

Dolphin Football Club was an Irish association football club, originally based in the Dublin suburb of Dolphin's Barn. Founded in 1921, the club was dissolved in the 1930s.

== History ==
Dolphin was formed by a group of butchers in 1921, the same year the League of Ireland was founded. These founders included butchers of German origin whose families arrived in Dublin in the late 1800s and who were associated with the Butchers Club on Gardiner Street, Dublin. William Reinhardt was one of the founders . The club was called Dolphin F.C. as it first played in the Dolphin's Barn area of Dublin.

It played in the League of Ireland between 1930–31 and 1936–37. In 1934–35 they were League of Ireland champions. After St James's Gate, Shamrock Rovers, Bohemians, Shelbourne and Dundalk, Dolphin became the sixth club to win the League of Ireland title. In 1931–32 and 1932–33 Dolphin played in two successive FAI Cup finals, losing both games to Shamrock Rovers. Between 1930 and 1931 and 1932–33 Dolphin also played in three successive Leinster Senior Cup finals, winning the cup in 1931–32.

=== Leinster Senior League ===
As the League of Ireland grew and expanded, it regularly recruited teams from the Leinster Senior League. This, in turn, created vacancies in the de facto second-level league. In the 1920s Dolphin were one of several clubs who availed of this opportunity to join the Leinster Senior League. Others included Brooklyn, Brideville, Drumcondra, Bray Unknowns and Dundalk. All of these clubs were eventually invited to join the League of Ireland. After winning the Leinster Senior League title in 1929–30, Dolphin also followed this path. The following season a Dolphin reserve team would win a second Leinster Senior League title for the club.

=== League of Ireland ===
Chart of yearly table positions for Dolphin in League of Ireland

In 1930–31 when the League of Ireland was expanded from ten to twelve teams, Dolphin, together with Waterford, were one of the two new teams elected to join. In 1931–32 Dolphin reached two cup finals. In the Leinster Senior Cup final they defeated Shelbourne 1–0. In the 1931–32 FAI Cup final, with a team that included Larry Doyle, Jeremiah Robinson, Alex Stevenson, Jimmy Shiels and Johnny Somers, Dolphin played Shamrock Rovers. However this time they lost 1–0. In 1932–33, they reached a second FAI Cup final, once again against Rovers. This time the Dolphin team included George Lennox, Larry Doyle, Joe Kendrick, Jimmy Bermingham, Johnny Somers and Willie Fallon. On 3 March 1933 at Dalymount Park, a crowd of 32,000 witnessed a game which produced six goals, including three penalties, and finished 3–3. George Lennox, with two penalties, and Willie Fallon were the scorers for Dolphin. However the replay saw Rovers win 3–1. Dolphin enjoyed their most successful season in 1934–35, when they won both the League of Ireland title and the Dublin City Cup. They also finished as runners up in the League of Ireland Shield and reached the semi-finals of the 1934–35 FAI Cup. In 1935–36 three Dolphin players – Ray Rogers, James Leonard and Eddie Carroll – scored 16 goals or more goals. They scored 56 of their team's 66 goals between them that season and were largely responsible for Dolphin finishing as League of Ireland runners-up. However, at the end of the 1936–37 Dolphin resigned from the League of Ireland and were replaced the following season by Limerick.

== Colours ==
The club colours were originally blue and white, but by the 1930s it wore white jerseys with black shorts and socks.

== Grounds ==
Dolphin originally played their home games at Dolphin Park, the same park now used by Kevin's Hurling Club. They continued to play there throughout their time in the League of Ireland. However, between 1932–33 and 1933–34 they also played some games at Harold's Cross Stadium. During their final two seasons in the league, 1935–36 and 1936–37 they also played some games at Tolka Park.

== Honours ==
- League of Ireland
  - Winners: 1934–35: 1
  - Runners-up: 1935–36: 1
- Dublin City Cup
  - 1934–35: 1
- Leinster Senior League
  - 1929–30, 1930–31: 2
- Leinster Senior Cup
  - Winners: 1931–32: 1
  - Runners-up: 1930–31, 1932–33: 2
- FAI Cup
  - Runners-up: 1931–32, 1932–33: 2
- League of Ireland Shield
  - Runners-up: 1934–35: 1

== Notable former players ==
=== Ireland internationals ===
The following Dolphin players represented Ireland (FAI) and/or Ireland (IFA) at full international level. Alex Stevenson, Joe Kendrick, Jeremiah Robinson, Larry Doyle and George Lennox all won international caps while playing for Dolphin.

- (Republic of Ireland) Larry Doyle
- (Republic of Ireland) Jimmy Bermingham
- (Republic of Ireland) Willie Fallon
- (Republic of Ireland) Joe Kendrick
- (Republic of Ireland) George Lennox
- (Republic of Ireland) Jeremiah Robinson
- (Republic of Ireland) (Ireland) Alex Stevenson
- (Republic of Ireland) Charlie Reid

=== Scotland international ===
- (Scotland) Alex Massie

=== Top Goalscorers ===
- Eddie Carroll (16) – 1935–36
- James Leonard (17) – 1935–36
- Ray Rogers (23) – 1935–36
- Jimmy Shiels (18) – 1931–32
- Johnny Somers (14) – 1931–32
