= FAI Cup =

Association Football competition in Republic of Ireland

Club Orange FAI Cup
- Organiser(s): Football Association of Ireland
- Founded: 1921–22
- Region: (Republic of Ireland) Ireland; Northern Ireland
- Teams: 44
- Qualifier for: UEFA Europa League
- Domestic cup: President of Ireland's Cup
- Current champions: Derry City (7th title) (2026)
- Most championships: Shamrock Rovers (26 titles)
- Broadcaster: RTÉ
- Website: fai.ie/mens-fai-cup
- 2026 FAI Cup

The Football Association of Ireland Senior Challenge Cup (FAI Cup), known as the Club Orange FAI Cup for sponsorship reasons, is a knock-out association football competition contested annually by teams from the Republic of Ireland (as well as Derry City from Northern Ireland). Organised by the FAI (Football Association of Ireland), the competition is currently sponsored by Club Orange. It was known as the Free State Cup from 1923 to 1936. Shamrock Rovers hold the record of most wins with 26.

The current holders are Derry City who won their 7th title on 8th November 2026, defeating Waterford 1–0 at the Aviva Stadium.

== Venues ==
Since the early 1920s until the 1980s, all but a handful of FAI Cup finals were held at Dalymount Park, Dublin. Two replays in the 1920s were held at Shelbourne Park, the 1973 replay was held in Flower Lodge in Cork and the 1984 replay was in Tolka Park. However, since 1990, due to the lack of development of Dalymount, the final has been played at a number of different venues. From 1990 until 1997 it was played at Lansdowne Road stadium, from 1997 to 1999 back at Dalymount, from 1999 to 2002 at Tolka Park and from 2003 to 2006 back at Lansdowne Road. Due to the redevelopment of Lansdowne, the 2007 and 2008 finals were played at the RDS Arena. The 2009 final took place in Tallaght Stadium. Finals from 2010 onwards take place at the Aviva Stadium.

== History ==
The first Football Association of Ireland (FAI) Cup final took place on St. Patrick's Day 1922. Initially known as the Free State Cup, the competition contained teams from the Falls and District League in Belfast. The inaugural champions were St. James's Gate, who beat Shamrock Rovers in Dalymount Park after a replay.

Shelbourne, Bohemians and Derry City are the only clubs to have won both the (Northern) Irish Cup and the FAI Cup, although Shelbourne and Bohemians only won it before partition, while Derry City remained in the Northern Irish league system until 1973, entering the League of Ireland in 1985. Alton United based in Belfast and Derry City are the only sides from outside the Republic of Ireland to win the competition.

Athlone Town in 1924, Dundalk in 1958, Shamrock Rovers in 1968 and Sligo Rovers in 2010 are the only sides ever to win the Cup without conceding a goal.

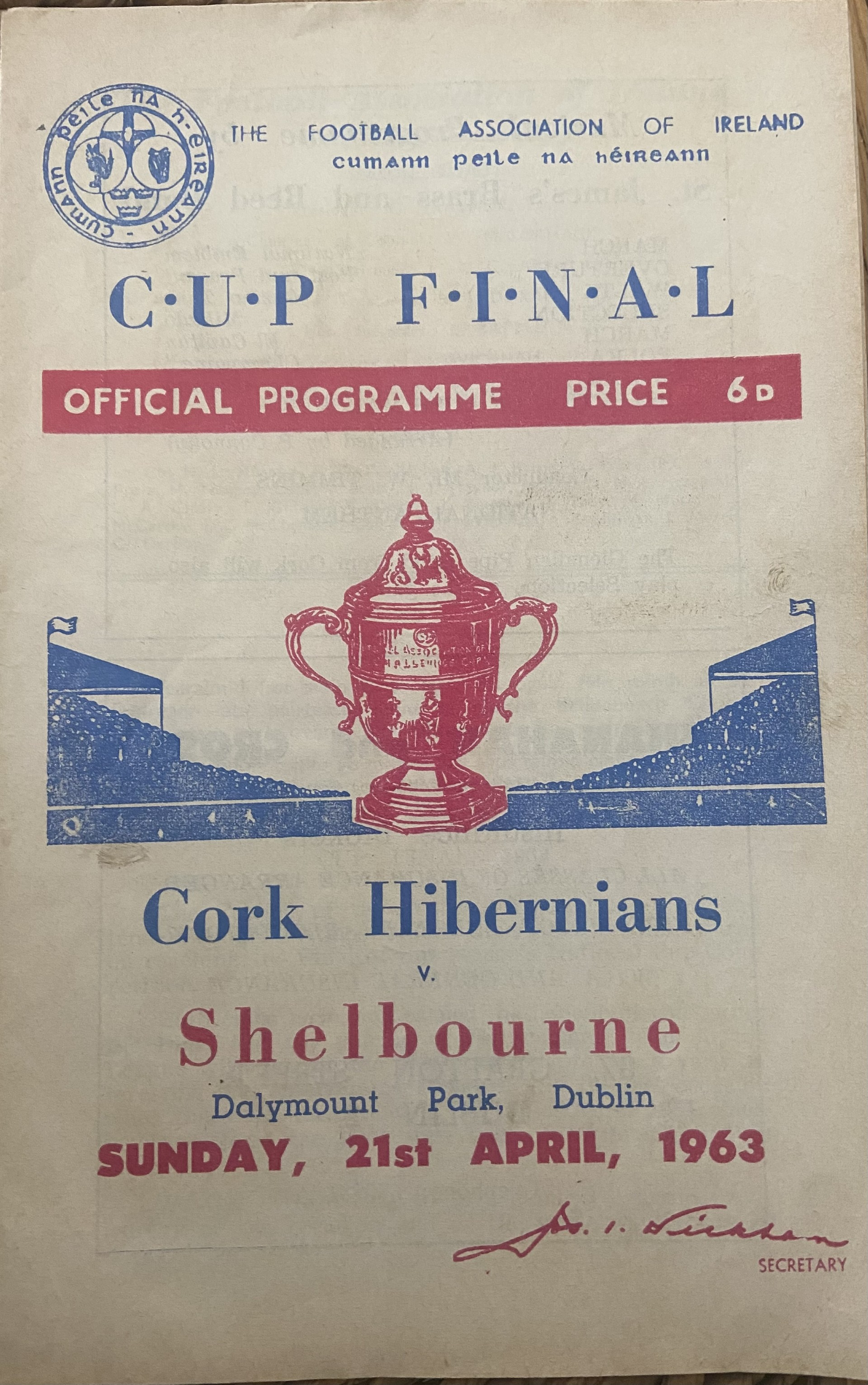
Match programme cover from the 1963 final at Dalymount Park

Since 2003, Irish domestic football has moved from the traditional European August–May season to a summer set-up, as favoured in Scandinavia. As an "interim" season was played in the second half of 2002, two FAI Cup Finals took place that year – Dundalk winning in April, and Derry City lifting the trophy in November.

Following the 1985 expansion of the League of Ireland to two Divisions, Bray Wanderers were the first First Division team to win the Cup, defeating non-League St. Francis in 1990. Bray were also the first team to win the Cup in a season that saw them relegated, in 1999. Dundalk were relegated in 2002 while winning the first of that year's trophies.

After two defeats in Cup Finals in the 1970s, Drogheda United finally reached the summit in 2005. Goals from Gavin Whelan (whose father, Paul, captained Bohemians to the 1992 cup and whose grandfather, Ronnie, won two cups with St. Patrick's Athletic) and captain Declan O'Brien helped "the Drogs" to a 2–0 win over Cork City.

The last soccer game to be played at the old Lansdowne Road was the 2006 final, contested between St. Patrick's Athletic and Derry City, who ran out eventual 4–3 winners after extra-time. The original FAI Cup was also retired after the game with a brand new version of the trophy to be used in the following seasons.

The largest ever win in the competition occurred on 29 November 2020 when Dundalk beat Athlone Town 11–0 at the semi-final stage.

The largest ever attendance at an FAI Cup game was 43,881 people, as St Patrick's Athletic defeated Bohemians 3–1 in the 2023 FAI Cup Final at the Aviva Stadium.

== Eligibility ==
44 clubs compete in the FAI Cup – 20 League of Ireland teams and 24 non-league teams. All clubs in the League of Ireland are automatically eligible. Clubs from non-league football (levels 3 and below on the Republic of Ireland league system) are also eligible provided they qualify from either the FAI Intermediate Cup or FAI Junior Cup competitions held earlier in the season. All participating clubs must also have a stadium suitable for the competition.

The total number of entries in the FAI Cup has changed as Non-League football has gradually been expanded and reorganised over time. It is very rare for top clubs to miss the competition, although it can happen in exceptional circumstances. As far back as 2014, non-league teams have been admitted through qualification via the FAI Intermediate and Junior cups. In the 2022 season, 38 clubs entered the competition including 19 non-league teams. For the 2024 season, 40 clubs competed in the competition. 20 of these were non-league teams: the last 16 from the FAI Intermediate Cup and the final four clubs from the FAI Junior Cup. The format was also altered slightly, with the preliminary rounds being merged into the first round and the League of Ireland teams entering the competition in the second round. The number of clubs increased ahead of the 2025 season, with all 8 quarter-finalists from the FAI Junior Cup now eligible, increasing the total number of entries to 44 clubs.

Northern Irish sides that play in Republic of Ireland leagues are eligible. There is only one club currently competing: Derry City.

=== Eligibility for the FAI Cup ===
Lvl	Competition	Entering cup at	No. of clubs
1	League of Ireland Premier Division	Second Round	All 10 teams qualify automatically
2	League of Ireland First Division	Second Round	All 10 teams qualify automatically
3–6	FAI Intermediate Cup	First Round	All 4th Round/Last 16 teams
7–12	FAI Junior Cup	First Round	All 8 quarter-finalists qualify

== Qualification for subsequent competitions ==
=== European football ===
The FAI Cup winners qualify for the following season's UEFA Europa League. As of 2025, qualification sees the cup winners enter at the Europa League's first qualifying round. Previously, the FAI Cup Winners entered the UEFA Conference League at the second qualifying round. The cup winners had initially qualified for the UEFA Cup Winners' Cup, starting with the 1961 winners up until the dissolution of the competition by UEFA at the end of 1998–99.

This European place applies even if the team is relegated or is not in the Republic of Ireland's top flight. In the past, if the FAI Cup winning team also qualified for the following season's UEFA European club competitions through their league or European performance, then the losing FAI Cup finalists were given the European berth of the FAI Cup winners. As of 2025, the FAI Cup's European spot is instead given to the second-placed team in the league and opens a UEFA Conference League first round qualification berth to the fourth-placed team in the league. Each club that qualifies for the UEFA Conference League gets prize money worth up to 10 million pounds.

=== Presidents Cup ===
The FAI Cup winners also qualify for the following season's single-match President of Ireland's Cup, the traditional season opener played against the previous season's Premier Division champions (or the Premier Divisions runners-up if the FAI Cup winners also won the league – the double).

== FAI Cup Finals ==
Season	Winner	Score	Runner-up	Venue	Attendance	Ref.
1921–22	St James's Gate	1 – 1 / 1 – 0 (R)	Shamrock Rovers	Dalymount Park / Dalymount Park	15,000 / 10,000	
1922–23	Alton United	1–0	Shelbourne	Dalymount Park	14,000	
1923–24	Athlone Town	1–0	Fordsons	Dalymount Park	18,000	
1924–25	Shamrock Rovers	2–1	Shelbourne	Dalymount Park	23,000	
1925–26	Fordsons	3–2	Shamrock Rovers	Dalymount Park	25,000	
1926–27	Drumcondra	1 – 1 / 1 – 0 (R)	Brideville	Dalymount Park / Shelbourne Park	25,000 / 10,000	
1927–28	Bohemians	2–1	Drumcondra	Dalymount Park	25,000	
1928–29	Shamrock Rovers	0 – 0 / 3 – 0 (R)	Bohemians	Dalymount Park / Shelbourne Park	22,000 / 15,000	
1929–30	Shamrock Rovers	1–0	Brideville	Dalymount Park	17,000	
1930–31	Shamrock Rovers	1 – 1 / 1 – 0 (R)	Dundalk	Dalymount Park / Dalymount Park	20,000 / 10,000	
1931–32	Shamrock Rovers	1–0	Dolphin	Dalymount Park	32,000	
1932–33	Shamrock Rovers	3 – 3 / 3 – 0 (R)	Dolphin	Dalymount Park / Dalymount Park	22,000 / 18,000	
1933–34	Cork	2–1	St James's Gate	Dalymount Park	21,000	
1934–35	Bohemians	4–3	Dundalk	Dalymount Park	22,000	
1935–36	Shamrock Rovers	2–1	Cork	Dalymount Park	30,946	
1936–37	Waterford	2–1	St James's Gate	Dalymount Park	24,000	
1937–38	St James's Gate	2–1	Dundalk	Dalymount Park	30,000	
1938–39	Shelbourne	1 – 1 / 1 – 0 (R)	Sligo Rovers	Dalymount Park / Dalymount Park	30,000 / 25,000	
1939–40	Shamrock Rovers	3–0	Sligo Rovers	Dalymount Park	38,509	
1940–41	Cork United	2 – 2 / 3 – 1 (R)	Waterford	Dalymount Park / Dalymount Park	30,132 / 13,057	
1941–42	Dundalk	3–1	Cork United	Dalymount Park	34,298	
1942–43	Drumcondra	2–1	Cork United	Dalymount Park	30,549	
1943–44	Shamrock Rovers	3–2	Shelbourne	Dalymount Park	34,000	
1944–45	Shamrock Rovers	1–0	Bohemians	Dalymount Park	41,238	
1945–46	Drumcondra	2–1	Shamrock Rovers	Dalymount Park	34,248	
1946–47	Cork United	2 – 2 / 2 – 1 (R)	Bohemians	Dalymount Park / Dalymount Park	20,198 / 5,519	
1947–48	Shamrock Rovers	2–1	Drumcondra	Dalymount Park	33,812	
1948–49	Dundalk	3–0	Shelbourne	Dalymount Park	28,539	
1949–50	Transport	2 – 2 / 2 – 2 (R) / 3 – 1 (R)	Cork Athletic	Dalymount Park / Dalymount Park / Dalymount Park	28,807 / 21,123 / –	
1950–51	Cork Athletic	1 – 1 / 1 – 0 (R)	Shelbourne	Dalymount Park / Dalymount Park	38,912 / 22,000	
1951–52	Dundalk	1 – 1 / 3 – 0 (R)	Cork Athletic	Dalymount Park / Dalymount Park	26,479 / 20,753	
1952–53	Cork Athletic	2 – 2 / 2 – 1 (R)	Evergreen United	Dalymount Park / Dalymount Park	17,396 / 6,000	
1953–54	Drumcondra	1–0	St Patrick's Athletic	Dalymount Park	20,000	
1954–55	Shamrock Rovers	1–0	Drumcondra	Dalymount Park	33,041	
1955–56	Shamrock Rovers	3–2	Cork Athletic	Dalymount Park	35,017	
1956–57	Drumcondra	2–0	Shamrock Rovers	Dalymount Park	30,000	
1957–58	Dundalk	1–0	Shamrock Rovers	Dalymount Park	27,000	
1958–59	St Patrick's Athletic	2 – 2 / 2 – 1 (R)	Waterford	Dalymount Park / Dalymount Park	22,000 / 22,800	
1959–60	Shelbourne	2–0	Cork Hibernians	Dalymount Park	32,308	
1960–61	St Patrick's Athletic	2–1	Drumcondra	Dalymount Park	22,000	
1961–62	Shamrock Rovers	4–1	Shelbourne	Dalymount Park	32,000	
1962–63	Shelbourne	2–0	Cork Hibernians	Dalymount Park	15,000	
1963–64	Shamrock Rovers	1 – 1 / 2 – 1 (R)	Cork Celtic	Dalymount Park / Dalymount Park	35,500 / 23,600	
1964–65	Shamrock Rovers	1 – 1 / 1 – 0 (R)	Limerick	Dalymount Park / Dalymount Park	22,000 / 19,436	
1965–66	Shamrock Rovers	2–0	Limerick	Dalymount Park	26,898	
1966–67	Shamrock Rovers	3–2	St Patrick's Athletic	Dalymount Park	12,000	
1967–68	Shamrock Rovers	3–0	Waterford	Dalymount Park	39,128	
1968–69	Shamrock Rovers	1 – 1 / 4 – 1 (R)	Cork Celtic	Dalymount Park / Dalymount Park	28,000 / 18,000	
1969–70	Bohemians	0 – 0 / 0 – 0 (R) / 2 – 1 (R)	Sligo Rovers	Dalymount Park / Dalymount Park / Dalymount Park	16,000 / 11,000 / 22,000	
1970–71	Limerick	0 – 0 / 3 – 0 (R)	Drogheda	Dalymount Park / Dalymount Park	16,000 / 15,000	
1971–72	Cork Hibernians	3–0	Waterford	Dalymount Park	22,500	
1972–73	Cork Hibernians	0 – 0 / 1 – 0 (R)	Shelbourne	Dalymount Park / Flower Lodge	12,500 / 11,000	
1973–74	Finn Harps	3–1	St Patrick's Athletic	Dalymount Park	14,000	
1974–75	Home Farm	1–0	Shelbourne	Dalymount Park	10,000	
1975–76	Bohemians	1–0	Drogheda United	Dalymount Park	10,400	
1976–77	Dundalk	2–0	Limerick	Dalymount Park	17,000	
1977–78	Shamrock Rovers	1–0	Sligo Rovers	Dalymount Park	12,500	
1978–79	Dundalk	2–0	Waterford	Dalymount Park	14,000	
1979–80	Waterford	1–0	St Patrick's Athletic	Dalymount Park	18,000	
1980–81	Dundalk	2–0	Sligo Rovers	Dalymount Park	12,000	
1981–82	Limerick United	1–0	Bohemians	Dalymount Park	12,000	
1982–83	Sligo Rovers	2–1	Bohemians	Dalymount Park	8,500	
1983–84	UCD	0 – 0 / 2 – 1 (R)	Shamrock Rovers	Dalymount Park / Tolka Park	8,000 / 6,500	
1984–85	Shamrock Rovers	1–0	Galway United	Dalymount Park	7,000	
1985–86	Shamrock Rovers	2–0	Waterford United	Dalymount Park	11,500	
1986–87	Shamrock Rovers	3–0	Dundalk	Dalymount Park	8,569	
1987–88	Dundalk	1–0	Derry City	Dalymount Park	21,000	
1988–89	Derry City	0 – 0 / 1 – 0 (R)	Cork City	Dalymount Park / Dalymount Park	20,000 / 12,000	
1989–90	Bray Wanderers	3–0	St. Francis	Lansdowne Road	29,000	
1990–91	Galway United	1–0	Shamrock Rovers	Lansdowne Road	15,257	
1991–92	Bohemians	1–0	Cork City	Lansdowne Road	17,000	
1992–93	Shelbourne	1–0	Dundalk	Lansdowne Road	11,000	
1993–94	Sligo Rovers	1–0	Derry City	Lansdowne Road	13,800	
1994–95	Derry City	2–1	Shelbourne	Lansdowne Road	15,000	
1995–96	Shelbourne	1 – 1 / 2 – 1 (R)	St Patrick's Athletic	Lansdowne Road / Dalymount Park	15,000 / 10,000	
1996–97	Shelbourne	2–0	Derry City	Dalymount Park	10,000	
1997–98	Cork City	0 – 0 / 1 – 0 (R)	Shelbourne	Dalymount Park / Dalymount Park	– / –	
1998–99	Bray Wanderers	0 – 0 / 2 – 2 (R) / 2 – 1 (R)	Finn Harps	Tolka Park / Tolka Park / Tolka Park	8,000 / – / 5,000	
1999–2000	Shelbourne	0 – 0 / 1 – 0 (R)	Bohemians	Tolka Park / Dalymount Park	9,000 / 9,000	
2000–01	Bohemians	1–0	Longford Town	Tolka Park	10,100	
2001–02	Dundalk	2–1	Bohemians	Tolka Park	10,100	
2002 (Interim)	Derry City	1–0	Shamrock Rovers	Tolka Park	10,100	
2003	Longford Town	2–0	St Patrick's Athletic	Lansdowne Road	12,000	
2004	Longford Town	2–1	Waterford United	Lansdowne Road	9,676	
2005	Drogheda United	2–0	Cork City	Lansdowne Road	24,521	
2006	Derry City	4 – 3 (a.e.t.)	St Patrick's Athletic	Lansdowne Road	16,022	
2007	Cork City	1–0	Longford Town	RDS	10,000	
2008	Bohemians	2 – 2 (a.e.t.); 4 – 2 (pen.)	Derry City	RDS	10,281	
2009	Sporting Fingal	2–1	Sligo Rovers	Tallaght Stadium	8,105	
2010	Sligo Rovers	0 – 0 (a.e.t.); 2 – 0 (pen.)	Shamrock Rovers	Aviva Stadium	36,101	
2011	Sligo Rovers	1 – 1 (a.e.t.); 4 – 1 (pen.)	Shelbourne	Aviva Stadium	21,662	
2012	Derry City	3 – 2 (a.e.t.)	St Patrick's Athletic	Aviva Stadium	16,117	
2013	Sligo Rovers	3–2	Drogheda United	Aviva Stadium	17,573	
2014	St Patrick's Athletic	2–0	Derry City	Aviva Stadium	17,038	
2015	Dundalk	1 – 0 (a.e.t.)	Cork City	Aviva Stadium	25,103	
2016	Cork City	1 – 0 (a.e.t.)	Dundalk	Aviva Stadium	26,400	
2017	Cork City	1 – 1 (a.e.t.); 5 – 3 (pen.)	Dundalk	Aviva Stadium	24,210	
2018	Dundalk	2–1	Cork City	Aviva Stadium	30,412	
2019	Shamrock Rovers	1 – 1 (a.e.t.); 4 – 2 (pen.)	Dundalk	Aviva Stadium	33,111	
2020	Dundalk	4 – 2 (a.e.t.)	Shamrock Rovers	Aviva Stadium	0*	
2021	St Patrick's Athletic	1 – 1 (a.e.t.); 4 – 3 (pen.)	Bohemians	Aviva Stadium	37,126	
2022	Derry City	4–0	Shelbourne	Aviva Stadium	32,412	
2023	St Patrick's Athletic	3–1	Bohemians	Aviva Stadium	43,881	
2024	Drogheda United	2–0	Derry City	Aviva Stadium	38,723	
2025	Shamrock Rovers	2–0	Cork City	Aviva Stadium	35,252	
2026	Derry City	1–0	Waterford	Aviva Stadium	36,093	
^{*}Denotes match in which Covid-19 restrictions limited attendance

== Performances ==
=== Performance by club ===
Rank	Club	Winners	Runners-up	Winning Years
1	Shamrock Rovers	26	10	1924–25, 1928–29, 1929–30, 1930–31, 1931–32, 1932–33, 1935–36, 1939–40, 1943–44, 1944–45, 1947–48, 1954–55, 1955–56, 1961–62, 1963–64, 1964–65, 1965–66, 1966–67, 1967–68, 1968–69, 1977–78, 1984–85, 1985–86, 1986–87, 2019, 2025
2	Dundalk	12	8	1941–42, 1948–49, 1951–52, 1957–58, 1976–77, 1978–79, 1980–81, 1987–88, 2001–02, 2015, 2018, 2020
3	Shelbourne	7	12	1938–39, 1959–60, 1962–63, 1992–93, 1995–96, 1996–97, 1999–00
3	Bohemians	7	9	1927–28, 1934–35, 1969–70, 1975–76, 1991–92, 2000–01, 2008
3	Derry City	7	6	1988–1989, 1994–1995, 2002, 2006, 2012, 2022, 2026
6	St Patrick's Athletic	5	8	1958–59, 1960–61, 2014, 2021, 2023
6	Sligo Rovers	5	6	1982–83, 1993–94, 2010, 2011, 2013
6	Drumcondra	5	4	1926–27, 1942–43, 1945–46, 1953–54, 1956–57
9	Cork City	4	6	1997–98, 2007, 2016, 2017
10	Waterford	2	7	1936–37, 1979–80
10	Cork Athletic	2	3	1950–52, 1952–53
10	Limerick	2	3	1970–71, 1981–82
10	Drogheda United	2	3	2005, 2024
10	Cork/Fordsons	2	2	1925–26, 1933–34
10	Cork Hibernians	2	2	1971–72, 1972–73
10	Cork United	2	2	1940–41, 1946–47
10	Longford Town	2	2	2003, 2004
10	St. James's Gate	2	2	1921–22, 1937–38
10	Bray Wanderers	2	-	1989–90, 1998–99
20	Finn Harps	1	1	1973–74
20	Galway United	1	1	1990–91
20	Alton United	1	-	1922–23
20	Athlone Town	1	-	1923–24
20	Transport	1	-	1949–50
20	Home Farm	1	-	1974–75
20	UCD AFC	1	-	1983–84
20	Sporting Fingal	1	-	2009
28	Cork Celtic	-	3	–
28	Brideville	-	2	–
28	Dolphin	-	2	–
28	St. Francis	-	1	–

Notes:

- 1 Includes Limerick United
- 2 Includes Drogheda F.C.
- 3 Includes Evergreen United
