= Cork F.C. =

Irish association football club

Cork
- Full name: Ford F.C. (1921–1922); Fordsons F.C. (1922–1930); Cork F.C. (1930–1938)
- Nicknames: The Tractors; League of Nations; The Leesiders
- Founded: 1921
- Ground: Ballinlough Road (1921–1930); The Mardyke (1930–1938)
- League: League of Ireland; Munster Senior League
Home colours

Cork Football Club was an Irish association football club based in Cork. They were founded as Fords F.C. and later became known as Fordsons F.C.. They played in the League of Ireland between 1924–25 and 1937–38. Like several fellow early League of Ireland clubs, such as St James's Gate, Jacobs, Midland Athletic and Dundalk, the club had their origins as a factory or works team. They were initially the football team of the Ford Motor Company, a major employer in the city at the time. In 1930, however, Ford ended its association with the club and they were renamed Cork. The club folded in 1938 and were replaced in the League of Ireland by a new club, Cork City.

== History ==
=== Fordsons ===
==== Early years ====
In 1921 Harry Buckle, a former Ireland international, settled in Cork and began working for the Ford Motor Company. Finding little or no association football activity in the city, Buckle founded Ford F.C. and then helped found the Cork-based South Munster League for the team to play in. In addition to playing and coaching with the new club, Buckle also served as president of the Tipperary/Limerick based – North Munster League and helped reform the Munster Football Association. By 1922–23 Ford F.C. had become Fordsons, renamed after the Fordson tractor, and the South Munster and North Munster leagues had merged to become the Munster Senior League. Fordsons also won their first Munster Senior Cup and in 1923–24 won their first Munster Senior League title. As a result, Fordsons qualified to represent the Munster Football Association in the FAI Cup. Playing as Fordsons the club would win the Munster Senior Cup four times, in 1929–30 winning it with a reserve team. On 23 February 1924 Bill O'Hagan became the first Fordsons to win representative honours when he played for an FAI XI in 3–0 defeat against Celtic.

==== FAI Cup ====
Fordsons made their FAI Cup debut in 1922–23. After drawing Rathmines Athletic in the first round they received a bye. In the quarter-finals they defeated Dublin United 3–2 in an away game. Played against the background of the Irish Civil War, travelling up to Dublin for the semi-final against Alton United proved hazardous. Fordsons train came under fire while passing near Blarney. They subsequently lost this semi-final 4–2. However, in 1923–24 they would go one stage further. After receiving another bye in the first round, Fordsons knocked out Jacobs and St James's Gate before they lost to 1–0 to Athlone Town in the final. In 1925–26 Fordsons reached the FAI Cup final for the second time. This time they defeated Shamrock Rovers 3–2. Against the odds, Fordsons defeated Rovers in a sensational final. Fordsons had previously failed to score in nine outings against Rovers and had leaked goals with scorelines ranging from 7–0 to 3–0. Fordsons twice came from behind before beating Rovers. The final was best remembered for Rovers' Bob Fullam withdrawing from a potential dangerous challenge with Bill O'Hagan.

==== League of Ireland ====
Chart of yearly table positions for Cork in League of Ireland

Fordsons joined the League of Ireland in 1924–25, replacing Shelbourne United who withdrew from the league on 7 September 1924, the day after the competition officially started. Together with Bray Unknowns, Fordsons became the second and third teams, after Athlone Town, from outside of County Dublin to join the league. They also became the first club to represent Cork city in the League of Ireland. In their debut season Fordsons finished a respectable fourth. In 1925–26 they finished third and then achieved three more fourth-placed finishes in 1926–27, 1927–28 and 1929–30.

Season	Position
1924–25	4th
1925–26	3rd
1926–27	4th
1927–28	4th
1928–29	7th
1929–30	4th

=== Cork F.C. ===
==== Name change ====
Sponsored by the Ford Motor Company, unlike later Cork teams in the League of Ireland, Fordsons did not have any financial difficulties. Even without the backing of Ford, they were reasonably self-sufficient, and regular top-four finishes provided healthy gate receipts. Despite this, at the end of the 1929–30 season, Fordsons were informed by the Ford management that they could continue only as a factory team and only compete in local leagues. As a result, the club parted company with Ford and changed their named to Cork Football Club.

==== League of Ireland ====
In the League of Ireland Cork F.C. continued were Fordsons left off. In 1931–32 and 1933–34 they runners-up. They also won the 1933–34 FAI Cup, defeating St. James's Gate 2–1. However the 1934–35 season saw Cork F.C.'s form slump dramatically when they suffered the ignominy of having to apply for re-election after finishing in last position with only 10 points from 18 games. However the outstanding goal scoring performance of Jimmy Turnbull in 1935–36 saw Cork F.C. finish in third place in the league. They also reached the 1935–36 FAI Cup final. Turnbull scored an astonishing 68 goals including a record 37 league goals and a further 11 in the cup campaign. However the season ended in controversy for Cork F.C. when it was revealed that two members of the Cup final team – Owen Madden and Jack O'Reilly – had agreed to sign for Norwich City. When Cork F.C., who received no fee, protested over the moves, both Madden and O'Reilly were suspended by the Football Association of Ireland (FAI) for three years. Having already lost two forwards the club subsequently lost a third when Turnbull signed for Belfast Celtic after the Cork F.C. directors refused to pay him a £50 signing-on fee for the next season. This decision effectively marked the beginning of the end for Cork F.C. and in 1936–37 they finished 11th out of twelve teams. Without the draw of Turnbull, crowd attendances and gate receipts dropped and the club went into serious financial decline. In 1937–38 the club began to struggle to raise funds to travel to away games in Dublin. Unable to travel they were forced to concede an away league game to Shelbourne. The final straw came when a demoralised team, paying their own train fares, were defeated 3–0 by St James's Gate in a 1937–38 FAI Cup game. Shortly after on 8 February 1938 it was announced that Cork F.C. was going into voluntary liquidation.

Season	Position
1930–31	4th
1931–32	2nd
1932–33	4th
1933–34	2nd
1934–35	10th
1935–36	3rd
1936–37	11th
1937–38	11th

== Home grounds ==
When playing as Fordsons the club played at Ballinlough Road, now the site of Pic Du Jer housing estate. However this site was owned by the Ford Motor Company so when the club became Cork F.C. they moved to The Mardyke.

== Notable former players ==
=== Dual Ireland internationals ===
- (Ireland) (Republic of Ireland) Harry Chatton
- (Ireland) (Republic of Ireland) Tom Davis
- (Ireland) (Republic of Ireland) Owen Madden

=== Ireland (FAI) internationals ===
On 21 March 1926 Frank Brady and James Connelly became the first two Fordsons players to represent Ireland (FAI) when they featured in an away game against Italy. On 12 February 1928 when Ireland beat Belgium 4–2 in an away game, the team featured three Fordsons players – Paddy Barry, Charlie Dowdall, and Jack Sullivan. Sullivan scored the last goal with a penalty in the 79th minute. Both Owen Kinsella and Mick McCarthy represented Ireland after leaving Fordsons.

==== Fordsons ====
- (Republic of Ireland) Paddy Barry
- (Republic of Ireland) Frank Brady
- (Republic of Ireland) Jimmy Connolly
- (Republic of Ireland) Charlie Dowdall
- (Republic of Ireland) Owen Kinsella
- (Republic of Ireland) Jack Sullivan
- (Republic of Ireland) Mick McCarthy
- (Republic of Ireland) Frank McLoughlin

==== Cork ====
On 25 February 1934 in a World Cup qualifier against Belgium the Ireland team featured three Cork players – Jim Foley, Tom Burke and Tim O'Keefe.

- (Republic of Ireland) Tom Burke
- (Republic of Ireland) Hugh Connolly
- (Republic of Ireland) Charlie Dowdall
- (Republic of Ireland) Jim Foley
- (Republic of Ireland) Bill Harrington
- (Republic of Ireland) Tim O'Keefe
- (Republic of Ireland) Jack O'Reilly

=== Ireland (IFA) internationals ===
- (Ireland) Harry Buckle
- (Ireland) Jack Doran
- (Ireland) Paddy Kelly
- (Ireland) Billy Millar
- (Ireland) Bill O'Hagan

=== League of Ireland XI players ===
- (Republic of Ireland) Frank Brady
- (Scotland) John Blair
- (Ireland) Paddy Kelly
- (England) Dave Roberts
- (England) Charlie Heinemann

=== Goalscorers ===
Charlie Heinemann, Pearson Ferguson and Jimmy Turnbull were the top goalscorers in the League of Ireland. John Blair was the second highest scorer in 1930–31. Turnbull remains the League of Ireland record top goalscorer in a single season.

- (Scotland) John Blair (21) – 1930–31
- (Scotland) Pearson Ferguson (21) – 1931–32
- (England) Charlie Heinemann (24) – 1927–28
- (England) Jimmy Turnbull (37) – 1935–36

== Honours ==
=== Fordsons ===
- FAI Cup
  - Winners: 1925–26
  - Runners-up: 1923–24
- Munster Senior Cup
  - Winners: 1922–23, 1923–24, 1925–26, 1928–29, 1929–30: 5
- Munster Senior League
  - Winners: 1923–24, 1928–29, 1929–30: 3
  - Runners-up: 1925–26, 1926–27

=== Cork ===
- League of Ireland
  - Runners-up: 1931–32, 1933–34
- FAI Cup
  - Winners: 1933–34
  - Runners-up: 1935–36
- Munster Senior Cup
  - Winners: 1933–34, 1936–37
  - Runners-up: 1930–31
- Munster Senior League
  - Winners: 1931–32
  - Runners-up: 1930–31

== See also ==
- Cork City F.C. (1938–1940)
- Cork United F.C. (1940–1948)
- Cork Athletic F.C.
- League of Ireland in Cork city
