= Bray Unknowns F.C. =

Bray Unknowns
- Full name: Bray Unknowns Football Club
- Ground: Carlisle Grounds; Bray; County Wicklow
- League: Leinster Senior League; League of Ireland

Bray Unknowns Football Club was an Irish association football club based in Bray, County Wicklow. During the 1920s and 1930s the Unknowns were the dominant football club in Bray, playing in the League of Ireland for nineteen seasons from 1924–25 to 1942–43. However, in the 1950s, Bray Wanderers emerged as the town's strongest team, enjoying success in both the Leinster Senior League and the FAI Intermediate Cup. During the 1960s both clubs were in decline. In 1973, after co-existing for nearly fifty years, the two clubs effectively merged under the Wanderers name.

== History ==
=== Early years ===
Bray Unknowns played a few seasons at the Carlisle Grounds around 1910. The club re-formed after the First World War and in 1921–22 were playing in the Leinster Senior League. Other teams in this league this season included Shamrock Rovers, Bohemians B, St James's Gate B, Pioneers, Shelbourne United, Midland Athletic, Brooklyn, Merrion, Glasnevin, CYMS and Richmond. In 1922–23 Bray Unknowns were Leinster Senior League champions and in 1923–24 they won the LFA Metropolitan Cup.

=== League of Ireland ===
Chart of yearly table positions for Bray Unknowns in League of Ireland

Bray Unknowns joined the League of Ireland in 1924–25, replacing Midland Athletic. Together with Fordsons, they became the second and third teams, after Athlone Town, from outside of County Dublin to join the league. During their time in the league, Bray Unknowns regularly finished in the bottom two. On 28 October 1928 Bray Unknowns lost 11–0 to Shamrock Rovers. This still remains Rovers record win. Bray Unknowns best performance in the league was a fourth-placed finish in 1936–37. They were FAI Cup semi-finalists in 1924–25, 1925–26 and 1939–40. At the end of the 1942–43 seasons Bray Unknowns failed to get re-elected.

=== Bray Wanderers ===
In 1973–74 Bray Unknowns were playing in the Leinster Senior League and two former Republic of Ireland internationals, Mick Meagan and Amby Fogarty were recruited as co-player managers. The club management also changed the club's name to Bray Wanderers.

== League of Ireland Stats ==
Stat	Opponent	Score	Date
Record Win	Brideville	7–1	28 November 1925
Record Defeat	Shamrock Rovers	0–11	28 October 1928

== Ground ==
Between 1924–25 and 1928–29, Bray Unknowns played their home games in Woodbrook, just over the County Dublin border. In 1929 they moved back to the Carlisle Grounds. The first League of Ireland match at the ground was a 2-2 draw between Unknowns and Dundalk during the 1929–30 season .

== Honours ==
- Leinster Senior League: 1
  - 1922–23
- LFA Metropolitan Cup: 1
  - 1923–24

== Notable former players ==
=== Ireland internationals ===
The following Bray Unknowns players represented Ireland at full international level.

- (Republic of Ireland) Jack Byrne
- (Republic of Ireland) Amby Fogarty
- (Republic of Ireland) Mick Meagan
- (Republic of Ireland) Alf Rigby
- (Republic of Ireland) Joe Williams

=== Goalscorers ===
- Top League Scorer (season): 21, Owen McNally (1930–31)
- Top League Scorer (total): 44, Paddy Leeney (1937–41)
