= List of Shamrock Rovers F.C. seasons =

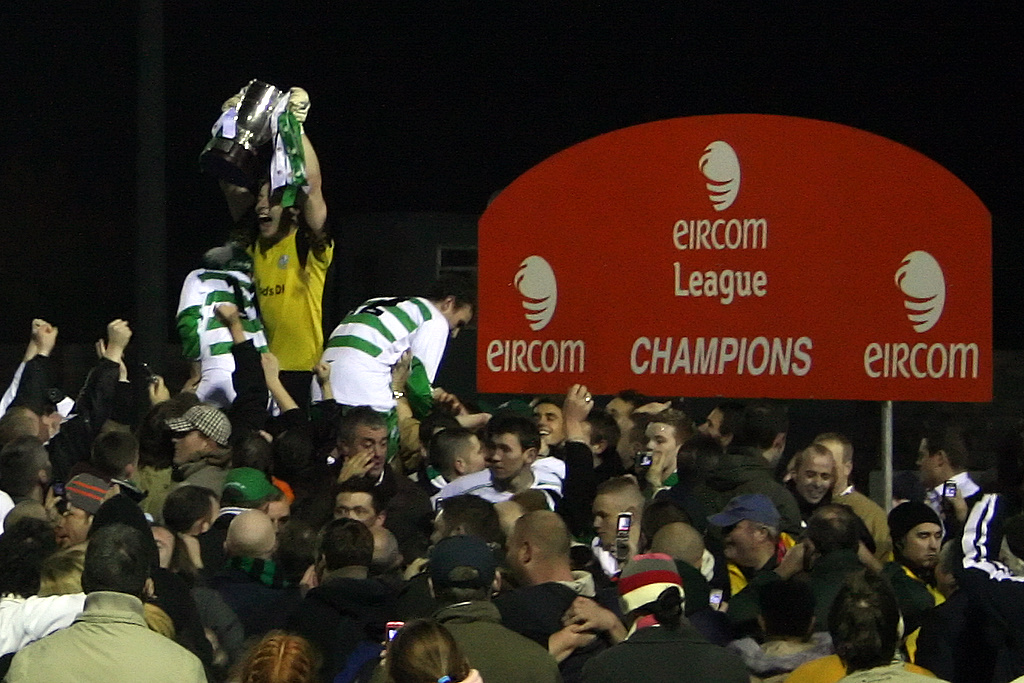
Barry Murphy holding the First Division trophy aloft in Cobh, County Cork

This is a list of seasons played by Shamrock Rovers Football Club in Irish and European football, from 1922 (year of entry into the League of Ireland) to the most recent completed season. The list details the club's achievements in all major competitions, and the top scorers for each league season.

Shamrock Rovers were founded in 1899, and were elected to the League of Ireland in 1922. They reached the final of the inaugural FAI Cup in the season before their election to the league and won the league title at their first attempt the following year. The club have won the League of Ireland a record 22 times, the FAI Cup a record 26 times, the League of Ireland Shield a record 18 times, the League of Ireland Cup once and have participated in European competition since 1957, when they became the first Irish side to do so.

Rovers were the first Irish club to qualify for European group stage football in 2011 and have done so again in 2022 and 2024. The club have finished bottom of the league once in their 94 seasons of participation, when they had to apply for re-election in 1976. The club were relegated for the first time in 2005 following an eight-point deduction and a play-off with Dublin City. Shamrock Rovers are the most successful club in the Republic of Ireland's footballing history.

== Seasons ==
Season	League of Ireland									FAI Cup^{[B]}	Shield/ League Cup^{[C]}	Europe^{[D]}		Top goalscorer(s)^{[E]}	
Season	Division^{[A]}	P	W	D	L	F	A	Pts	Pos	FAI Cup^{[B]}	Shield/ League Cup^{[C]}	Europe^{[D]}		Name	Goals
1922–23		22	18	3	1	77	19	39	**1st**	R2	R2^{[C]}			**Bob Fullam**	**27**
1923–24		18	7	3	8	35	32	17	7th	R1	3rd			Willie O'Shea	8
1924–25		18	13	5	0	67	12	31	**1st**	**W**	**1st**			**Billy Farrell**	**25**
1925–26		18	13	3	2	62	21	29	2nd	RU	2nd			**Billy Farrell**	**24**
1926–27		18	14	4	0	60	20	32	**1st**	R1	**1st**			**David Byrne**	**17**
1927–28		18	9	7	2	41	18	25	3rd	R1	2nd			David Byrne	**7**
1928–29		18	10	4	4	58	28	24	3rd	**W**	2nd			John Joe Flood	**13**
1929–30		18	12	2	4	44	22	26	3rd	**W**	2nd			David Byrne	**11**
1930–31		22	9	5	8	54	49	23	7th	**W**	7th			David Byrne	**18**
1931–32		22	13	6	3	70	34	32	**1st**	**W**	**1st**			**Paddy Moore**	**18**
1932–33		18	11	2	5	48	32	24	2nd	**W**	**1st**			**Tommy Doyle**	**17**
1933–34		18	9	4	5	28	23	22	3rd	R1	2nd			Jackie Coote	6
1934–35		18	5	6	7	27	33	16	6th	R1	**1st**			**Synnott**	**6**
1935–36		22	10	2	10	61	58	22	6th	**W**	6th			**Paul Scully**	**18**
1936–37		22	8	3	11	46	55	19	9th	R2	3rd			Matt Regan/Charlie Reid/Joe Ward	**7**
1937–38		22	14	4	4	71	47	32	**1st**	SF	**1st**			Joe Ward	**18**
1938–39		22	16	4	2	60	32	36	**1st**	R1	6th			Owen McNally	**14**
1939–40		22	13	4	5	51	39	30	2nd	**W**	6th			Jimmy Dunne	**15**
1940–41		20	9	3	8	48	43	21	4th	SF	6th			Jimmy Clark	**16**
1941–42		18	12	4	2	52	23	28	2nd	SF	**1st**			Davy Cochrane	**11**
1942–43		18	8	4	6	36	28	20	4th	R2	5th			**Paddy Coad**	**12**
1943–44		14	5	5	4	38	27	15	3rd	**W**	2nd			**Paddy Coad**	**15**
1944–45		14	6	5	3	20	20	17	3rd	**W**^{[F]}	8th			Paddy Coad/Liam Crowe/Tommy Eglington/Bobby Rogers	**3**
1945–46		14	6	2	6	40	31	14	4th	RU	4th			**Tommy Eglington**	**11**
1946–47		14	7	3	4	34	21	17	3rd	R1	6th			**Paddy Coad**	**11**
1947–48		14	4	6	4	26	24	14	4th	**W**	2nd			**Paddy Coad**	**9**
1948–49		18	6	8	4	33	25	20	4th	R1	5th			Paddy Mullen	**9**
1949–50		18	7	4	7	39	30	18	7th	R2	**1st**			Bob Duffy	**11**
1950–51		18	7	3	8	33	30	17	6th	R2	2nd			Christy Boggan	**8**
1951–52		22	12	5	5	43	18	29	3rd	R2	**1st**			Billy Burns	**15**
1952–53		22	12	3	7	40	27	27	3rd	R1	9th			Danny Jordan	**9**
1953–54		22	11	8	3	44	20	30	**1st**	SF	3rd			**Paddy Ambrose**	**13**
1954–55		22	12	4	6	63	37	28	3rd	**W**	**1st**			**Paddy Ambrose**	**14**
1955–56		22	15	1	6	54	30	31	2nd	**W**	**1st**			**Paddy Ambrose**	**20**
1956–57		22	15	6	1	68	24	36	**1st**	RU	**1st**			**Tommy Hamilton**	**15**
1957–58		22	15	1	6	55	26	31	2nd	RU	**1st**	European Cup	PR	**Maxie McCann**	**9**
1958–59		22	15	4	3	58	29	34	**1st**	R1	2nd	DNQ		**Liam Tuohy**	**10**
1959–60		22	12	3	7	54	31	27	4th	R2	10th	European Cup	PR	**Dermot Cross**	**11**
1960–61		22	9	7	6	40	29	25	6th	R2	5th	DNQ		Paddy Ambrose/Eddie Bailham	**8**
1961–62		22	14	3	5	51	32	31	3rd	**W**	3rd	DNQ		**Eddie Bailham**	**21**
1962–63		18	7	5	6	36	25	19	5th	SF	**1st**	UEFA Cup Winners' Cup	R1	**Jackie Mooney**	**11**
1963–64		22	14	7	1	68	27	35	**1st**	**W**	**1st**	Inter-Cities Fairs Cup^{[G]}	R1	**Eddie Bailham**	**18**
1964–65		22	14	3	5	40	22	31	2nd	**W**	**1st**	European Cup	PR	**Jackie Mooney**	**16**
1965–66		22	15	4	3	59	23	34	2nd	**W**	**1st**	Inter-Cities Fairs Cup^{[G]}	R2	Bobby Gilbert/Liam Tuohy	14
1966–67		22	8	4	10	31	31	20	7th	**W**	3rd	UEFA Cup Winners' Cup	R2	**Frank O'Neill**	**8**
1967–68		22	11	5	6	44	26	27	4th	**W**	**1st**	UEFA Cup Winners' Cup	R1	Mick Leech/Damien Richardson	**10**
1968–69		22	14	3	5	56	28	31	2nd	**W**	3rd	UEFA Cup Winners' Cup	R1	**Mick Leech**	**19**
1969–70		26	14	8	4	55	29	36	2nd	R1	Grp^{[C]}	UEFA Cup Winners' Cup	R1	**Eric Barber**	**15**
1970–71	^{[H]}	26	14	7	5	49	38	35	2nd	R2	Grp^{[C]}	DNQ		**Damien Richardson**	**15**
1971–72		26	12	4	10	52	41	28	5th	QF	Grp^{[C]}	DNQ		**Frank O'Neill**	**11**
1972–73		26	12	6	8	45	32	30	5th	R2	RU^{[C]}	DNQ		**Mick Leech**	**10**
1973–74		26	11	5	10	31	33	27	7th	R1	Grp	DNQ		**Donal Murphy**	**12**
1974–75		26	10	5	11	40	38	25	8th	QF	Grp	DNQ		Robbie Cooke	**7**
1975–76		26	4	7	15	27	49	15	14th	R1	R1	DNQ		Robbie Cooke	**7**
1976–77		26	7	3	16	26	46	17	11th	R1	**W**	DNQ		**Mick Leech**	**8**
1977–78		30	14	12	4	45	22	40	4th	**W**	Grp	DNQ		**Ray Treacy**	**17**
1978–79		30	17	3	10	45	25	37	5th	SF	RU	UEFA Cup Winners' Cup	R2	Ray Treacy	**8**
1979–80		30	14	10	6	61	29	38	4th	R4	SF	DNQ		**Alan Campbell**	**22**
1980–81		30	14	8	8	37	29	36	5th	R4	R1	DNQ		**Liam Buckley**	**11**
1981–82	^{[I]}	30	21	3	6	50	23	76	2nd	QF	RU	DNQ		**Liam Buckley**	**21**
1982–83	^{[J]}	26	10	8	8	39	25	38	6th	QF	Grp	UEFA Cup	R2	**Liam Buckley**	**11**
1983–84	^{[J]}	26	19	4	3	64	15	42	**1st**	RU	Grp	DNQ		**Alan Campbell**	**24**
1984–85		30	22	5	3	63	21	49	**1st**	**W**	SF	European Cup	R1	**Mick Byrne**	**12**
1985–86	Premier	22	15	3	4	44	17	33	**1st**	**W**		European Cup	R1	**Paul Doolin**	**11**
1986–87	Premier	22	18	3	1	51	16	39	**1st**	**W**	RU	European Cup	R1	**Mick Byrne**	**12**
1987–88	Premier	33	16	9	8	53	30	41	4th	R4	RU	European Cup	R1	**Mick Byrne**	**11**
1988–89	Premier	33	8	13	12	34	42	29	7th	SF	QF	DNQ		Roddy Collins	8
1989–90	Premier	33	16	8	9	45	37	40	4th	R2	Grp	DNQ		Vinny Arkins	9
1990–91	Premier	33	14	9	10	51	37	37	6th	RU	SF	DNQ		Vinny Arkins	14
1991–92	Premier	33	9	15	9	33	30	33	6th	R1	Grp	DNQ		Derek Swan	7
1992–93	Premier^{[K]}	32	8	12	12	39	35	28	8th	QF		DNQ		Derek Swan	8
1993–94	Premier	32	21	3	8	62	30	66	**1st**	R1		DNQ		**Stephen Geoghegan**	**23**
1994–95	Premier	33	14	9	10	45	36	51	6th	QF	QF	UEFA Cup	PR	Derek Tracey	8
1995–96	Premier	33	14	8	11	32	32	50	5th	QF		DNQ		Mark Reid	10
1996–97	Premier	33	10	13	10	43	46	43	7th	R2		DNQ		**Tony Cousins**	**16**
1997–98	Premier	33	14	10	9	41	32	52	4th	R2	Grp	DNQ		Tony Cousins	15
1998–99	Premier	33	9	13	11	34	40	40	8th	R1	RU	UEFA Intertoto Cup	R1	Jason Sherlock	8
1999–00	Premier	33	13	11	9	49	36	50	5th	R2	QF	DNQ		Billy Woods/Sean Francis	7
2000–01	Premier	33	10	12	11	50	47	42	7th	SF	QF	DNQ		Sean Francis	13
2001–02	Premier	33	17	6	10	54	32	57	2nd	SF	SF	DNQ		Sean Francis	14
2002–03	Premier	27	12	7	8	42	29	43	3rd	RU^{[L]}	N/A^{[L]}	UEFA Cup	QR	Noel Hunt	11
2003	Premier	36	10	14	12	45	46	44	7th	R2	QF	UEFA Intertoto Cup	R2	Trevor Molloy	9
2004	Premier	36	10	8	18	41	47	38	9th	R3	Grp	DNQ		Stephen Grant	6
2005	Premier	33	9	8	16	33	52	27	11th	QF	R2	DNQ		Paddy McCourt	7
2006	**First**	36	21	12	3	53	13	72	**1st**	SF	QF	DNQ		Tadhg Purcell	11
2007	**Premier**	33	14	9	10	36	26	51	5th	R2	SF	DNQ		Tadhg Purcell	12
2008	Premier	33	8	13	12	33	35	37	7th	R4	R2	DNQ		Padraig Amond	9
2009	Premier	36	21	10	5	51	27	73	2nd	QF	QF	DNQ		**Gary Twigg**	**24**
2010	Premier	36	19	10	7	57	34	67	**1st**	RU	SF	Europa League	QR	**Gary Twigg**	**20**
2011	Premier	36	23	8	5	69	24	77	**1st**	QF	R2	Europa League	Grp	Gary Twigg	15
2012	Premier	30	14	10	6	56	37	52	4th	QF	RU	Champions League	QR	**Gary Twigg**	**22**
2013	Premier	33	13	13	7	43	28	52	5th	SF	**W**	DNQ		Gary McCabe/Ronan Finn	8
2014	Premier	33	18	8	7	43	26	62	4th	SF	RU	DNQ		Gary McCabe/Eamon Zayed	8
2015	Premier	33	18	11	4	56	27	65	3rd	2R	SF	Europa League	QR	Michael Drennan	12
2016	Premier	33	16	7	10	46	34	55	4th	QF	SF	Europa League	QR	Gary McCabe	10
2017	Premier	33	17	3	13	49	34	54	3rd	SF	RU	Europa League	QR	Gary McCabe	15
2018	Premier	36	18	8	10	57	27	62	3rd	R1	R2	Europa League	QR	Graham Burke	13
2019	Premier	36	23	6	7	62	21	75	2nd	**W**	R2	Europa League	QR	Aaron Greene	11
2020	Premier	18	15	3	0	44	7	48	**1st**	RU	N/A	Europa League	QR	Jack Byrne	9
2021	Premier	36	24	6	6	59	28	78	**1st**	2R	N/A	Champions League	QR	Danny Mandroiu	15
2022	Premier	36	24	7	5	61	22	79	**1st**	QF	N/A	UEFA Europa Conference League	Grp	Graham Burke	11
2023	Premier	36	20	12	4	67	27	72	**1st**	R1	N/A	Champions League	R1	Graham Burke	12
2024	Premier	36	17	10	9	48	34	52	2nd	R2	N/A	UEFA Europa Conference League	KPO	Johnny Kenny	13
2025	Premier	36	19	9	8	56	33	66	**1st**	**W**	N/A	UEFA Europa Conference League	LP	Rory Gaffney	9
2026	Premier	36	20	8	8	59	38	68	**1st**	R1	N/A	Champions League	R1	John McGovern	10

=== Key ===
Champions	Runners-up	Promoted	Relegated

Division shown in bold when it changes due to promotion or relegation. Top scorers shown in bold are players who finished the season as top scorer of their division.

Key to league record:

- P = Played
- W = Games won
- D = Games drawn
- L = Games lost
- F = Goals for
- A = Goals against
- Pts = Points
- Pos = Final position

Key to divisions:

- Premier = LOI Premier Division
- First = LOI First Division

Key to rounds:

- DNQ = Did not qualify
- QR = Qualifying Round
- PR = Preliminary Round
- R1 = First Round
- R2 = Second Round
- R3 = Third Round
- R4 = Fourth Round
- R5 = Fifth Round
- Grp = Group Stage
- QF = Quarter-finals
- SF = Semi-finals
- RU = Runners-up
- W = Winners

== Notes ==
A. Prior to 1985 there was just one division. Six new teams were introduced for the 1985–86 season and the league was split into two divisions.

B. Shamrock Rovers reached the final of the inaugural FAI Cup in 1921–22 as a Leinster Senior League side and lost to St. James's Gate in a replay.

C. ^{a} ^{b} ^{c} ^{d} ^{e} The League of Ireland Shield was introduced in 1921 with the League of Ireland as League and FAI Cup fixtures were insufficient to last a full season. The club didn't compete in the inaugural Shield competition as it wasn't a member of the League. The competition usually comprised one round of fixtures, though it was also played over two rounds and on a knockout basis during certain seasons. The Shield was played on a sectional basis from 1969 to its abolition in 1973. The League of Ireland Cup replaced the Shield in 1973.

D. Prior to UEFA's foundation in 1954, European competition was restricted to a number of different tournaments with limited entry which are not recognised as European Cups.

E. Only League goals are counted, goals scored in other competitions are not included.

F. Largest recorded attendance for a FAI Cup final of 44,238, Shamrock Rovers F.C. 1–0 Bohemian F.C., April 22 1945, Dalymount Park, Dublin.

G. ^{a} ^{b} While the Inter-Cities Fairs Cup is considered to be the predecessor to the UEFA Cup, UEFA do not consider the tournament to be an official UEFA contest.

H. Shamrock Rovers and Cork Hibernians were level on points at the end of the 1970–71 season. Cork Hibs won the resultant play-off for the title. The statistics above do not include that play-off.

I. An experimental points system was operated for the 1981–82 season whereby a team was awarded four points for an away win, three points for a home win, two points for an away draw and one point for a home draw.

J. ^{a} ^{b} In 1982–83 three points were awarded for a win and one point for a draw. The system reverted the following season to the pre-1981–82 system, i.e. two points for a win and one point for a draw.

K. In 1992–93 the Premier Division 'split' into two sections of six after the 22nd series of games had been played on 17 January. Rovers did not qualify for the top six and finished in second place of the bottom six (Group 'B') or eighth place overall.

L. ^{a} ^{b} The Premier Division was cut to 10 teams and shortened in length by maintaining only 3 rounds of fixtures in the 2002–03 season. The FAI Cup final was played in October '02 making it two FAI Cup finals in one year. The League Cup competition was not played. These measures were aimed at easing the transition from a "Winter schedule"(Autumn-Summer) to "Summer Soccer"(Spring-Winter).
