= History of Shamrock Rovers F.C. =

Shamrock Rovers Football Club (Irish: Cumann Peile Ruagairí na Seamróige) is a football club from Dublin, Ireland. Founded in Ringsend, a southside, inner suburb of Dublin, the club's date of foundation is uncertain and disputed. Between 1926 and 1987 the club played at Glenmalure Park, Milltown. Shamrock Rovers F.C. is Ireland's most successful football club having won the League of Ireland a record 21 times, including four times in a row in the 1980s and again in 2020s, along with the FAI Cup a record 25 times, including six times in a row in the 1960s. It was also the first Irish club to participate in a European competition, playing in the European Cup in 1957. Shamrock Rovers was also one of the European club teams that spent the 1967 season in the United States to found the United Soccer Association, representing Boston as the Boston Rovers.

Shamrock Rovers F.C. has supplied more players to the Republic of Ireland national football team (64) than any other club. Famous players that have played for the club include: Paddy Moore, Jimmy Dunne, Paddy Coad, Jackie Jameson, Frank O'Neill, John Giles, Mick Leech, Pat Dunne, Noel Synnott, Jim Beglin, Paddy Mulligan, Johnny Fullam, Mick Smyth, Liam O'Brien, and Eamon Dunphy. Irish rugby union international Tony Ward also played for the club for a period in the 1970s. Prior to the 1970s, Shamrock Rovers F.C. was well supported, attracting over 20,000 people regularly to Glenmalure Park and up to 45,000 for Cup Finals and European matches at Dalymount Park. Shamrock Rovers spent 22 years, from 1987 to 2009, as a homeless club during which time they experienced severe financial troubles and entered into examinership.

== Foundation and early history ==
The foundation of Shamrock Rovers is disputed amongst supporters of the club. No official documentation of the era exists. The earliest known mention of the club in the newspaper archives at the National Library of Ireland comes from 1899 and an article in the club programme from 28 December 1941 claims that the club was founded in this year. This contention is also backed by the testimony of certain relatives of former chairmen and committee members. The only two certainties about the origins of the club in relation to what year they were formed are the facts that, Rovers played only friendly games for the first two years of their existence and the club registered with the Leinster Football Association in 1901. Essentially, the dispute is over whether the two years of friendlies were played before or after the registration with the LFA. Throughout the 1970s and 1980s, the date 1899 was written on the gates of Glenmalure Park but since the 1990s, 1901 has been adopted as the founding year by the various regimes which have run the club.

Shamrock Rovers F.C. originally hails from Ringsend, a southside, inner suburb of Dublin. The club was formed at a meeting held at no. 4 Irishtown Road, home of Lar Byrne, the first secretary of Shamrock Rovers. It was the idea of brothers John and Michael James Gregg to form the club and together with Johnny Hopkins, William Maguire, 'Mikey' Caulfield, 'Granda' Gaffney, Archie Murphy, John Fullam, William Saunders and others unknown, they formed the inaugural committee. Larry Fitzpatrick, a Ringsend fisherman often credited as the founder of the club in 1899, was also actively involved in the formation of the club and sat on the early committees. The name of the club derives from Shamrock Avenue in Ringsend, where the first club rooms were secured. In September 1906, after a few seasons in operation, Rovers withdrew from the First Division of the Leinster Senior League. At a meeting in 1914 Shamrock Rovers F.C. was resurrected, playing matches at Ringsend Park, but within two years, the park became unavailable. The club disbanded and played only friendly games for the next five years. In 1921, Shamrock Rovers F.C. was resurrected once more, as a Leinster Senior League outfit and reached the final of the first ever FAI Cup where they lost to St James's Gate F.C. in a fixture marred by crowd violence. The following season, the club won the League of Ireland title at the first attempt, going 21 games unbeaten and scoring 77 goals. In 1924, the star of the league winning side of two years previous, Bob Fullam returned to Rovers from Leeds United and together with John Joe Flood, John 'Kruger' Fagan and Billy Farrell, completed the famous forward line known as the 'Four Fs'. By the end of the club's fifth season in the league, Rovers had won three league titles and one cup. During the 1930s, the club won a further three league titles and five FAI Cups in front of crowds of up to 30,000 people in Milltown with legendary Irish internationals, Paddy Moore and Jimmy Dunne playing key roles in the success of the club. By 1949, Rovers established themselves as Ireland's most successful football club, winning forty-four major trophies – six League of Ireland titles, eleven FAI Cups, seven League of Ireland Shields, six Leinster Senior Cups, two Dublin City Cups, four Inter-City Cups and eight LFA President's Cups.

== Coad's Colts ==
In November 1949, following the death of Jimmy Dunne, Paddy Coad reluctantly accepted the position of player-manager having played with the club for almost eight years, in which time he had established himself as one of the best players in the League of Ireland. Coad opted for a radical youth policy and over the course of his first three years in charge, signed virtually the entire schoolboy international side to Rovers. He employed revolutionary training methods with extra emphasis on technical skill and possession which resulted in a fast, passing style of football that contributed significantly to the development of the game in Ireland. In 1954, the club won the League of Ireland for the first time in fifteen years, while Paddy Ambrose finished the season as the team's leading scorer. Led by players like Liam Tuohy and Coad himself, the team known as Coad's Colts proceeded to win two more League titles and two FAI Cups, concluding the golden era of Irish football as one of its most successful teams.

== Six in a row ==
After the departure of Coad in 1960 and an unsuccessful season under Albie Murphy, Seán Thomas took on the role of rebuilding the Rovers team which had suffered from the break-up of Coad's Colts. Paddy Ambrose and Ronnie Nolan had remained with the club and were joined by a large selection of signings including Irish internationals, Frank O'Neill and Johnny Fullam. The decision by Liam Tuohy to return to the club as captain, after four successful years at Newcastle United, effectively saw the completion of Thomas' side. The club won every domestic honour except the Top Four Competition in the 1963–64 season and were narrowly defeated by holders and eventual finalists, Valencia, in the Inter-Cities Fairs Cup. Thomas, however, quit the Hoops at the end of the season following a dispute with the Cunninghams (the owners) over team selection. Liam Tuohy took over as player-manager and led the club to a further five FAI Cups in succession, completing a series of six, including a 3–0 defeat of League of Ireland champions, Waterford in 1968, in front of 40,000 people at Dalymount Park. The summer of 1967 was spent in the United States, participating in the foundation of the United Soccer Association, where Rovers represented Boston as Boston Rovers. The 1968–69 season saw Mick Leech score a total of 56 goals for the club, including two in the last FAI Cup final of the Six in a Row period, against Cork Celtic.

== Decline ==
The Hoops' defeat by Shelbourne in the first round of the FAI Cup in 1970, their first defeat in 32 Cup games over seven years, marked the start of the decline in the fortunes of the club. Despite only narrowly missing out on the league title in the 1970–71 season under controversial circumstances, the next twelve years proved to be a disaster for the club both on and off the field. On 25 April 1971, Rovers met the Cork Hibs in Dalymount in a League play-off watched by 28,000 people. Their pre-match buildup was thrown into disarray when players and directors clashed over win bonuses. The Hibs won the play-off 3–1. The next season, the Cunninghams, now under the control of sons Arthur and Des, sold the club to three brothers from Dublin: Paddy, Barton and Louis Kilcoyne. The Kilcoynes had witnessed decades of huge attendances at Irish football games and sought to take over the club primarily for business reasons. However, within the space of five years, the large crowds disappeared from Irish football stadia and combined with the demise of Drumcondra and Cork Hibs, the decline in fortunes of a number of top clubs and the lack of action by the FAI, the League of Ireland was plunged into a drastic decline. Faced with dwindling attendances, the Kilcoynes decided to starve the club and sold off senior players who were replaced by junior footballers. On a tour of Japan in 1975, Mick Meagans/Theo Dunne's young side defeated the Japan national team 3–2 in front of 60,000 spectators at the Olympic Stadium, but that victory was the highlight of a season that saw the team finish at the bottom of the table and re-apply for admission into the League of Ireland.

In 1976, Mick Meagan and Theo Dunne resigned from the club and were replaced by Seán Thomas, the architect of the Six in a Row side who, with limited resources, re-signed Johnny Fullam and Mick Leech, as well as John Conway from Bohemians. Rovers finished the 1976–77 season in eleventh but won the club's only League of Ireland Cup, with Leech's 250th career goal proving the difference against Sligo. In July 1977, Irish international player-manager John Giles returned to Dublin to take up the same role at Rovers. The Kilcoynes implemented a full-time policy and unveiled plans to rebuild Glenmalure Park as a 50,000 all-seater stadium as well as turning the club into a school of excellence for Irish football, capable of challenging for European honours. Giles signed Irish internationals, Ray Treacy, Eamon Dunphy and Paddy Mulligan to complement the youth setup. In his first season in charge, the club won their 21st FAI Cup, defeating Sligo in a controversial final, but despite that success and emphatic victories in European competition against Apoel Nicosia and Fram Reykjavík, Giles' conservative approach based on possession football proved unsuccessful and on 3 February 1983, he resigned.

== Four in a row ==
In the summer of 1983, Jim McLaughlin replaced Noel Campbell as Rovers' manager, after a successful period at Dundalk. Louis Kilcoyne made money available to McLaughlin who responded by selling and releasing almost the entire squad he had inherited from the Giles era, including fans' favourite, Alan O'Neill, while retaining the services of Liam Buckley, Harry Kenny, Alan Campbell and Peter Eccles. Kilcoyne brought in what was effectively a League of Ireland XI which included Jody Byrne and Noel King from Dundalk, Mick Neville from Drogheda, the trio of Eviston, Brady and O'Brien from Bohemians, and Anto Whelan and Neville Steedman from Manchester United and Thurles Town . On 1 April 1984, the club clinched their first League of Ireland title in 20 years with a 3–1 defeat of Shelbourne and 14 days later against Limerick at Glenmalure Park midfielder and captain, Pat Byrne was presented with the trophy. Following that success, the club's two star strikers, Campbell and Buckley, were transferred to Racing de Santander and K.S.V. Waregem. McLaughlin replaced them with Mick Byrne and Noel Larkin and the pairing proved successful as the club proceeded to win a further three League titles and three FAI Cups, with Byrne finishing the final season of the Four in a Row period as the League's top goalscorer. Dermot Keely managed and played for the club that year after McLaughlin's decision to transfer to Derry City. The Hoops won 74 League games out of 100 from August 1983 to April 1987, losing only 11.

== The homeless years ==
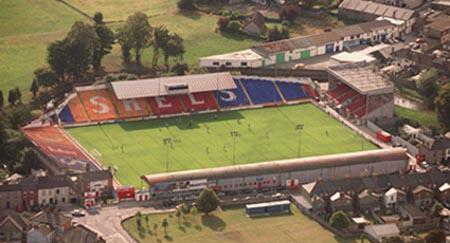
Tolka Park

Shortly after winning the 14th League title, Louis Kilcoyne announced that the Kilcoynes were selling Glenmalure Park, which they had recently purchased from the Jesuits. The team played the entire 1987–88 season in an almost empty Tolka Park as a result of a boycott called for by the Shamrock Rovers Supporters Club and KRAM (Keep Rovers at Milltown), which was observed by the vast majority of Hoops fans. Following the completion of the boycott season in Tolka, the Kilcoynes sold the football club to Dublin businessman, John McNamara, who put forward a controversial proposal to move in with Bohemians at Dalymount Park. KRAM congregated to vote on whether to lift the boycott and on the proposal to move to Dalymount. Both motions were passed and the club spent the next two seasons at the Phibsboro venue, with an unrecognisable side playing in front of small attendances.

As the 1989–90 season concluded, the club announced that they were moving to the RDS Arena in Ballsbridge, located halfway between Ringsend and Milltown on the Southside of Dublin. On 30 September 1990, the RDS played host to Shamrock Rovers against St. Patrick's Athletic, in front of 27,000 people. The fixture started a six-year period at the venue that included a league title winning season in 1993–94. Ray Treacy managed the league winning side that included Paul Osam, Gino Brazil, John Toal, Alan Byrne and Stephen Geoghegan, who ended the season as top goalscorer. The next season, a number of key players were released as Treacy and McNamara enforced a tight budget and opted to rebuild the side with young players. The team began the season with a heavy defeat to Górnik Zabrze in the 1994–95 UEFA Cup and struggled their way to a midtable standing. They started the 1995–96 season badly and by late that season, after almost two years of growing supporter discontent at the running of the club, Treacy resigned, with McNamara following him shortly afterward. One of McNamara's final acts was to appoint Alan O'Neill and Terry Eviston, who had both returned to the club in 1993, as joint managers of the side. They succeeded in removing the threat of relegation and almost guided the team to European qualification.

=== Long road to Tallaght ===
As the 1995–96 season concluded, John McNamara sold the club to Premier Computers, headed by Alan McGrath. McGrath unveiled a plan to build a state-of-the-art stadium in the Dublin southwest suburb of Tallaght, and employed Pat Byrne as commercial manager. However, after a couple of weeks and a loss in the first game of the season, O'Neill was dismissed, while Eviston resigned in solidarity. Byrne was appointed manager of the side playing in Tolka Park once again, and they struggled through the season with the League's joint top scorer, Tony Cousins playing a leading role in avoiding relegation. In May 1997, Alan McGrath resigned as club chairman and was replaced by Brian Kearney, also of Premier Computers, who succeeded in acquiring planning permission for the new stadium in January 1998. However, the permission was delayed by objections until November 1998, by which time Joe Colwell had replaced Kearney as chairman and ended Premier Computers' involvement with the club. On the pitch, Mick Byrne guided Rovers to an Intertoto Cup spot in 1997–98 and an eighth-place finish, the next season. Byrne was replaced by Damien Richardson, who managed the club during its stay at Morton Stadium before his dismissal in April 2002, after a disagreement with Colwell. By that time, a half-built shell of a stadium stood at the Tallaght site; Mulden International Ltd, recruited by Colwell to complete the project, had pulled out of building the stadium. They leased it to a separate company, transferring the responsibility, and focused on four acres that they had retained for themselves.

=== Examinership and survival ===
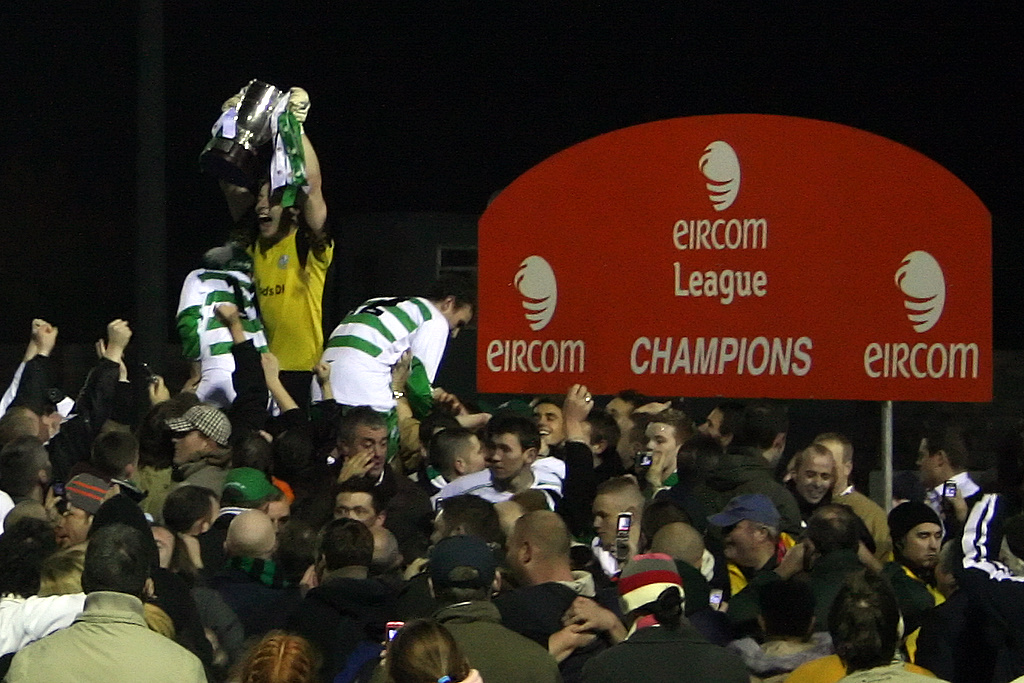
Promotion in 2006

Tony Maguire replaced Colwell as chairman and began the search for potential investors. In his first season as manager, Liam Buckley guided the club to the FAI Cup final and European qualification, as the team played at Richmond Park. The 2003 season was marked by the club's worsening finances as a deal with potential investor, Conor Clarkson was held up by Mulden's reluctance to sell their land. Having successfully applied for a one-year planning extension in October 2003, the club applied for a further extension a few months after Buckley's departure in September 2004. SDCC refused the application, but clarified their position by confirming their intention to build the stadium in partnership with the club, once the issue of ownership had been resolved. The trustees of the 400 Club (supporters group) informed the board of directors that they were no longer willing to bankroll their ownership of Shamrock Rovers.

Faced with the choice of remaining with Clarkson, whose plans were nullified by SDCC's decision, or cooperating with the council, Maguire chose the former and with Mulden's financing, initiated a High Court judicial review of the decision. The review failed and on 11 April 2005, facing debts of over two million Euro, the club entered into examinership. The 400 Club agreed to completely bankroll the club during the process. On 5 May 2005, Tony Maguire resigned at the request of the FAI, who had discovered that the club had submitted their 2003 accounts in their application for a licence for the 2005 season. This resulted in a points deduction and subsequent relegation under Roddy Collins. The examinership concluded in July 2005 with the examiner accepting the 400 Club's bid for the Shamrock Rovers, saving the club from extinction, and the supporters-owned club won promotion at the first attempt in 2006 under Pat Scully. The 2007 and 2008 seasons at Tolka Park were ones of overachievement and stability, but the major event of the period was the recommencement of building on the stadium after more than two years of legal disputes between the council and Thomas Davis CLG.

== Home in Tallaght ==
The 2009 season proved to be a progressive one for the club, starting with the completion of the stadium and ending with a second-place finish and qualification to the Europa League under the management of Michael O'Neill. Tallaght Stadium hosted the highest attendances in the League of Ireland, regularly selling out its capacity. The season was also marked by the visit of Real Madrid to Tallaght Stadium, where they defeated The Hoops 1–0 in front of a record attendance of 10,900 people. Tallaght Stadium hosted its first game in European club competition when Rovers drew 1–1 with Bnei Yehuda of Israel in the 2010–11 Europa League. The team progressed to a third qualifying round tie against Juventus by defeating Bnei Yehuda 1–0 in the return fixture in Israel. The Italian side won the first leg 2–0 in Tallaght, through a double by Amauri. and Rovers held the Bianconeri to just one strike by Alessandro Del Piero in the Stadio Alberto Braglia, Modena.

The 2011 League of Ireland season turned out to be the most successful season in the long and distinguished history of Ireland's biggest club. The club played its first ever Champions League game and its first game in the highest level of European Cup Competition's since the 1987–88 European Cup, beating Estonian Champions Flora Tallinn in the 2011–12 Champions League Second qualifying round. They accomplished this feat by triumphing 1–0 in the first leg at Tallaght Stadium and drawing 0–0 in the second leg in Estonia to advance 1–0 on aggregate. Rovers were then beaten 3–0 on aggregate in the next round by Danish Champions Copenhagen but advanced to the 2011–12 Europa League Play-off round. There they were drawn against Serbian Champions FK Partizan, whom they defeated 3–2 on aggregate (2–1 on the night after extra time) to reach the group stages of the Europa League. This marked a noteworthy victory for Irish football, as it was the first time an Irish club has reached the group stages of a major European competition. Rovers also won the 2011 Setanta Sports Cup by defeating Dundalk in the final at Tallaght Stadium. Rovers wrapped up a second league title in a row with a last-minute victory over UCD at Belfield on 25 October 2011.

=== Bradley era ===
The club suffered something of a lean spell after the highs of the 2011 season. Michael O'Neill departed to manage the Northern Ireland national team and was replaced by Stephen Kenny. However, Kenny was fired after less than a full season in 2012. His successor Trevor Croly also did not last long as manager full season as manager despite winning two minor trophies, the League Cup and Setanta Cup in 2013.He was sacked in mid 2014. Pat Fenlon a former Rovers player was appointed the following season but he too failed to win major trophies. In 2016 he was replaced by Stephen Bradley, another former player, who at that time was coaching one of the club's underage sides. It took some time for Bradley to rebuild a winning team to challenge the then-dominant Dundalk.

However, through developing young players and astute signings such as Jack Byrne, Rovers steadily improved under Bradley's management. In 2019 Bradley's team won the FAI Cup, defeating Dundalk after penalties in the final, before a crowd of over 33,000, the first time that Rovers had won the Cup since 1987. The following season, a campaign truncated by the COVID-19 pandemic, Rovers won a shortened league season unbeaten. In the Europa League qualifying rounds Rovers were narrowly beaten 2–0 by Italian giants AC Milan. Dundalk denied Bradley's team a 'double' however, beating them in the FAI Cup Final, which due to the pandemic, was played behind closed doors. In 2021, despite losing star players such as Jack Byrne and Aaron McEneff, before the start of the season, Shamrock Rovers retained the title, finishing sixteen points ahead of nearest rival St Patrick's Athletic and picking up the trophy before a full house in Tallaght Stadium against Drogheda United. In 2022, Rovers won their third league title in a row, picking up the trophy in a 1–0 win against Derry City. The club also qualified for the group stages of the UEFA Conference League for the first time. Attendances also continued to improve, with an average of more than 6,000 fans attending home games in Tallaght stadium in 2022. In 2023, the club made history by winning the league title again for the fourth year in a row, thus equalling the record set by the Hoops team of the 1980's. It was the clubs 21st title overall. The 2024 league season was disappointing in that Rovers narrowly failed to retain their league title, which was won by Shelbourne. However Stephen Bradley's side did well in Europe, qualifiying for the group stage of the UEFA Conference League and qualifying to the knockout rounds where they were ultimately knocked out on penalties by Norwegian side Molde. In 2025 Shamrock Rovers recovered their title and won a league and FAI Cup double as well as again qualifying for the group stages of the Conference League. Rovers won their 22th league title with a home 1-0 win against Galway United and defeated Cork City 2-0 in the FAI Cup Final. In October 2026 Shamrock Rovers won their 23rd League title.

== Bibliography ==
- Rice, Eoghan (2005). We Are Rovers. Nonsuch. ISBN 1-84588-510-4.
- Paul Doolan, Robert Goggins (1993). The Hoops. Gill & Macmillan Ltd. ISBN 0-7171-2121-6.
