= Bobby Gilbert =

Irish footballer

Personal information
- Full name: Robert Gilbert
- Place of birth: Dublin, Republic of Ireland
- Position: Forward

Senior career*
Years	Team	Apps	(Gls)
1957–1959	St Patrick's Athletic	31	(11)
1959–1963	Derry City	?	(?)
1963–1964	Shelbourne	12	(4)
1964–1965	Portadown	12	(5)
1964–1965	Derry City	7	(5)
1965–1968	Shamrock Rovers	48	(21)
1967	→ Boston Rovers (loan)	6	(1)
1968–1970	Drumcondra	33	(15)
1970–1971	Dundalk	7	(2)
1971–1972	Shelbourne	1	(0)

International career
1966	Republic of Ireland	1	(0)
1967	League of Ireland XI	1	(0)
- * Club domestic league appearances and goals

Bobby Gilbert is an Irish former footballer who played for, among others, Derry City and Shamrock Rovers. Gilbert scored in European competitions for both City and Rovers. As an international he also played for the Republic of Ireland.

== Derry City ==
Together with Jimmy McGeough, Jim Crossan and Matt Doherty, Gilbert was a member of the Derry City team that overcame F.C. Lyn Oslo in a European Cup tie in 1965. As a result, City became the first Irish League team to win a European Cup tie over two legs. In the first leg, played away on 31 August, Gilbert headed in two goals in a 5–3 defeat. However, he missed the return leg on 9 September because of injury, but Gilbert's two goals helped City to an 8–6 aggregate win. Legend has that Gilbert's injury resulted from a punch in the head he received in a nightclub the night before the game.

== Shamrock Rovers ==
Having already played for Rovers minors in 1958 Gilbert made his senior debut for Shamrock Rovers on 24 October 1965 in a League of Ireland Shield game against St. Patrick's Athletic and scored a hat-trick as Rovers won 9–1. He went on to finish the 1965–66 season as Rovers' top goalscorer. Together with Liam Tuohy, Johnny Fullam, Pat Dunne, Frank O'Neill, Mick Leech and Paddy Mulligan, Gilbert was a prominent member of the Rovers team that dominated the FAI Cup during the 1960s. He played in three successive finals, finishing on winning side each time. In 1966 they beat Limerick United, in 1967 they St Patrick's Athletic and in 1968 they beat Waterford United. In April 1966 Gilbert scored three goals in the semi-final of the FAI Cup against Waterford United. He scored once in the original 2–2 draw and then twice in a 4–2 replay. During the summer of 1967, Gilbert also played for Rovers when they went to the United States and competed as Boston Rovers in the United Soccer Association league.

One of the highlights of his time with Rovers came in November 1966 when Rovers came close to knocking, Bayern Munich, the eventual winners, out of the European Cup Winners Cup. After holding Bayern to a 1–1 draw at Dalymount Park, goals from Gilbert and Liam Tuohy saw Rovers came back from 2–0 down during the away game. Rovers were winning the tie on away goals when a late goal from Gerd Müller saw Bayern win 3–2 on the night and progress to the next round. Gilbert scored his fourth goal in European competition the following season in a European Cup Winners Cup game against Cardiff City. Gilbert's goal earned Rovers a 1–1 draw in the home leg. However Rovers subsequently lost the tie 3–1 on aggregate.

== Republic of Ireland ==
On 4 May 1966, while playing for Shamrock Rovers, Gilbert made his one and only appearance the Republic of Ireland in friendly against West Germany at Dalymount Park. The Republic lost 4–0 and Gilbert never won another cap.

== Honours ==
Shamrock Rovers

- FAI Cup
  - Winners 1966, 1967, 1968: 3
- League of Ireland Shield
  - Winners 1965–66, 1967–68: 2
- Dublin City Cup
  - Winners 1966–67: 1
- Blaxnit Cup
  - Winners 1967–68: 1
- Top Four Cup
  - Winners 1965–66: 1

Dundalk

- Leinster Senior Cup
  - Winners 1970–71: 1
