= Liam Tuohy (footballer) =

Irish footballer & manager (1933–2016)

Personal information
- Date of birth: 27 April 1933
- Place of birth: East Wall, Dublin, Ireland
- Date of death: 13 August 2016 (aged 83)
- Position: Outside left

Youth career
- Stella Maris
- 194x–1951: St. Mary's, East Wall

Senior career*
Years	Team	Apps	(Gls)
1951–1960	Shamrock Rovers	126	(46)
1960–1963	Newcastle United	38	(9)
1963–1969	Shamrock Rovers	85	(41)
1967	→ Boston Rovers (guest)	9	(3)

International career
1956–1964	League of Ireland XI	24	(7)
1957–1958	Republic of Ireland B	3	(0)
1955–1965	Republic of Ireland	8	(4)

Managerial career
- 1964–1969: Shamrock Rovers
- 1967: Boston Rovers
- 1969–1970: Dundalk
- 1968–1972: League of Ireland XI
- 1971–1973: Republic of Ireland
- 1972–1973: Shamrock Rovers
- 1975–1981: Dublin University
- 1981–1982: Shelbourne
- 1981–1986: Republic of Ireland U19
- * Club domestic league appearances and goals

Liam Tuohy (27 April 1933 – 13 August 2016) was an Irish footballer and manager. During the 1950s and 1960s, Tuohy played as an outside left for Shamrock Rovers, Newcastle United, and the Republic of Ireland. In 1959, while playing for Ireland, Tuohy scored the first ever goal in the history of the European Championship. After retiring as a player, Tuohy became a coach and managed several clubs in the League of Ireland including Shamrock Rovers, Dundalk, and Shelbourne.

He also managed the Republic of Ireland. In July 1973, he also took charge of the Shamrock Rovers XI that played Brazil in a prestige friendly, and during the 1980s, he successfully coached the Republic of Ireland U-19s. He subsequently served as a director of football at Home Farm, before retiring in 2002. Tribute was paid in October 2007 to members of the Shamrock Rovers team members that won the FAI Cup six consecutive seasons during the 1960s, by the FAI.

== Early years ==
Tuohy was born in East Wall, a working class area on Northside Dublin. He was the second youngest in a family of six boys. His father, Gerry, died when he was young, leaving him and his five brothers to be raised by his mother, Sadie. Tuohy played in goal at hurling for his school, St. Joseph's, and began playing soccer for St. Mary's, East Wall. After leaving school, Tuohy initially worked as a wheel builder for Royal Enfield, delivered groceries and assembled prams.

== Club career ==
=== Shamrock Rovers ===
In August 1951, after impressing the Rovers mentors in a FAI Youth Cup game for St Mary's, Tuohy was signed by Shamrock Rovers. Despite finishing top scorer after a season with the under 21s and another as top scorer with the second team, he didn't make his League of Ireland until 7 March 1954 at Glenmalure Park.

Tuohy had made such an impact that just six months later he was selected on the League of Ireland XI to play The Football League XI. As a 21-year-old, Tuohy attracted the interest of both West Bromwich Albion and Aston Villa, but he opted to remain with Rovers. Under player-manager Paddy Coad, he subsequently became a prominent member of the successful Rovers team nicknamed Coad's Colts. During this era, Rovers won the League of Ireland title three times and the FAI Cup twice. They also made their debut in European competition, and in 1959 Tuohy scored the first of four goals for Rovers at this level, when he scored their second goal in 3–2 away defeat against Nice in the European Cup.

On 3 May 1960, a testimonial against Newcastle United was held for both Tuohy and Liam Hennessy. Having given a good account of himself, Charlie Mitten signed him.

=== Newcastle United ===
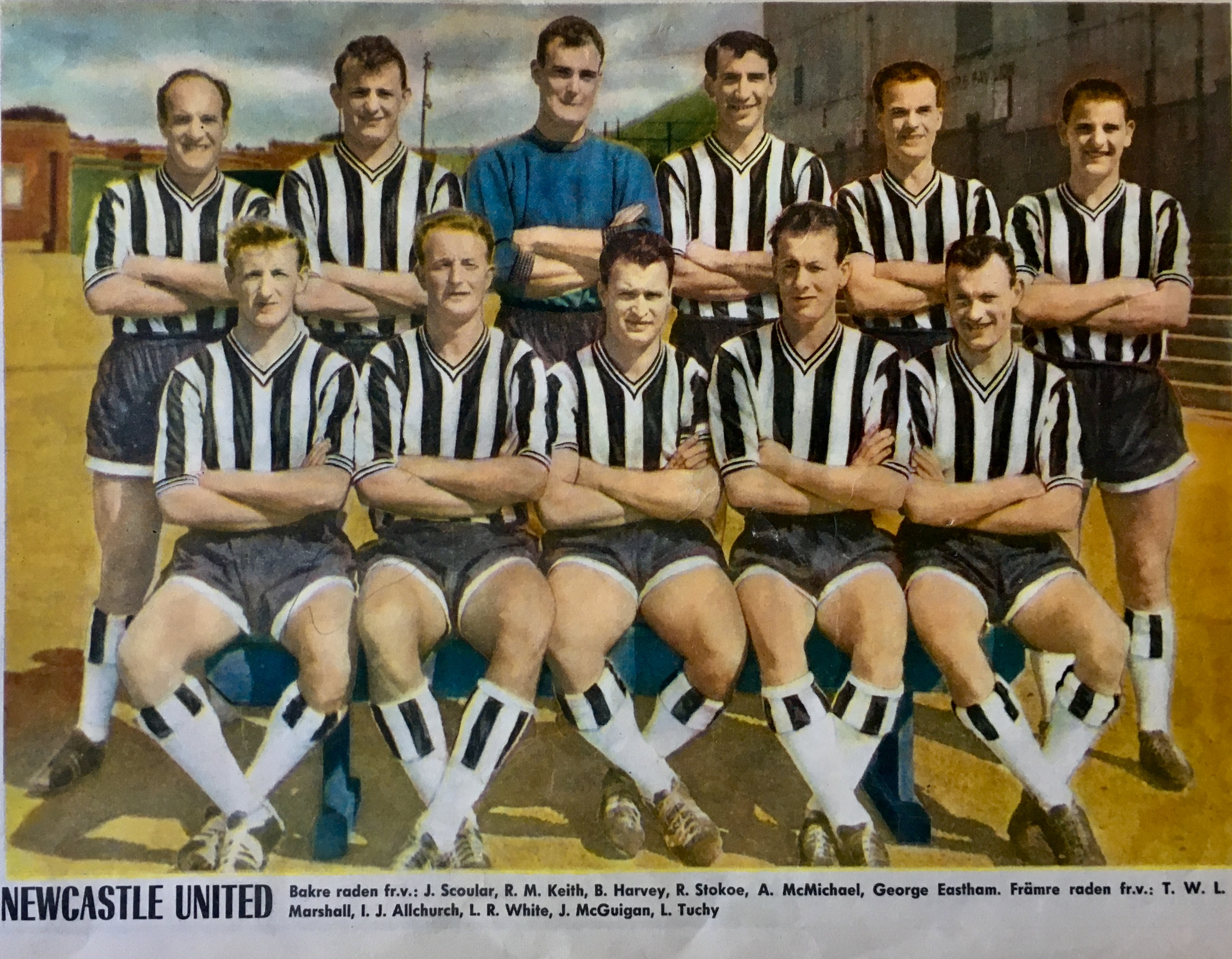
Newcastle United F.C. in 1960: players from the left, standing: James "Jimmy" Scoular, Richard Matthewson "Dick" Keith, Bryan Harvey (goalkeeper), Bob Stokoe, Alf McMichael and George Eastham; crouched: "Terry" W. L. Marshall, Ivor Allchurch, Len White, John McGuigan and Liam Tuohy.

By 1960, Tuohy, now aged 27, had met and married his wife Sheila and had fathered three children. He had played part-time for Rovers for nine years and was now working for Guinness at St. James's Gate Brewery. It was at this stage that he accepted an offer from Newcastle United in May 1960, to play full-time in the English League. He made his debut on 8 August 1960, and during three years with the club, he made 42 total appearances and scored 9 goals.

== International career ==
Between 1955 and 1965, Tuohy made 8 appearances and scored 4 goals for the Republic of Ireland. He made his debut on 10 October 1955, while at Shamrock Rovers, in a 4–1 defeat in a friendly against Yugoslavia. The match was controversial because Yugoslavia was a communist state and the Archbishop of Dublin, John Charles McQuaid, boycotted it in protest against the persecution of Catholic officials under Marshal Tito's regime. Tuohy won his next two caps while playing for Newcastle United.

On 5 April 1959, Tuohy scored his first goal for Ireland, the opening goal in a 2–0 win against Czechoslovakia at Dalymount Park. This match was a "preliminary round" qualifier for the inaugural European Nations' Cup, and so was the Republic of Ireland's first ever game in the competition. It has been reported many times since that Tuohy's goal was the first ever to be scored in a European nations' championship; however, a goal by Anatoli Ilyin in a September 1958 first round match for the USSR against Hungary predates Tuohy's strike.

Tuohy's remaining three international goals were all scored in 1962. His second goal for Ireland came in a 3–2 defeat in a friendly against Austria. He then scored in both games against Iceland during the qualifiers for the 1964 European Nations' Cup. Tuohy played his last game for Ireland on 24 March 1965, in a friendly against Belgium.

== Coaching career ==
=== Shamrock Rovers ===
In 1963, Tuohy returned to Shamrock Rovers as a player-coach and helped the club win a League of Ireland/FAI Cup double. In 1964, he was appointed Rovers player-manager and he subsequently guided a team that included, among others, Bobby Gilbert, Johnny Fullam, Pat Dunne, Frank O'Neill, Mick Leech and Paddy Mulligan to a consecutive run of FAI Cup wins between 1964 and 1969. Tuohy also added to his tally of goals in European competition. In 1963, during a Fairs Cup game against Valencia, he scored in a 2–2 draw. He scored again in 1965, in another Fairs Cup game against Real Zaragoza, which finished 1–1. However the highlight of his European exploits came in 1966, when Rovers came close to knocking the eventual winners Bayern Munich out of the European Cup Winners Cup. After holding Bayern to a 1–1 draw at Dalymount Park, goals from Bobby Gilbert and Tuohy saw Rovers came back from 2–0 down during the away game. Rovers were winning the tie on away goals when a late goal from Gerd Müller saw Bayern win 3–2 on the night and progress to the next round. In total he made 16 appearances scoring 4 goals for Rovers in European competition.

During the summer of 1967, Tuohy also played for and managed Rovers when they competed as Boston Rovers in the United Soccer Association league. In June 1972, he returned to Rovers for a second spell as manager, but resigned on 20 December 1973.

=== Dundalk ===
In 1969, Tuohy was appointed manager of Dundalk, after moving there with his job at HB Ice Cream, and on 16 September they lost 10–0 to Liverpool in the Fairs Cup. During this time at Oriel Park, he was also a club director. Tuohy remained in charge of Dundalk until 1972, guiding them to victory in the Leinster Senior Cup in 1971, and the League of Ireland Shield in 1972.

=== Republic of Ireland ===
In 1971, Tuohy was appointed manager of the Republic of Ireland. His first game in charge was on 10 October 1971, a 6–0 defeat away to Austria. The game, a European Championship qualifier, had been arranged for a Sunday, the day after a full league program in England. Forced to field a team of mainly League of Ireland players, Tuohy resolved that this would not happen again. He demanded that all future fixtures be played on a Wednesday and over the following months he travelled to England and began discussions with various team managers to secure the release of his star players for future internationals. On 4 January 1972, in Tuohy's second game in charge Ireland beat the visiting West German Olympic XI 3–0. In June 1972, Tuohy took an Ireland squad to Brazil to compete in the Brazilian Independence Cup. While there they played four games, earning respectable wins over Iran and Ecuador.

Tuohy was also in charge of Ireland during the qualifiers for the 1974 FIFA World Cup. Denied the services of Johnny Giles and Paddy Mulligan through injury and Don Givens who was not released by Queens Park Rangers, Ireland were beaten 2–1 by the Soviet Union on 18 October 1972. However a month later on 15 November, Giles returned and inspired Ireland to a 2–1 win over France. On 13 May 1973, a 1–0 defeat to the Soviets effectively ended Ireland's chances of qualifying for the World Cup.

On 19 May 1973 in the return game against France, Tuohy took charge of Ireland for the last time. After just eleven games in charge, Tuohy resigned. At the same time as managing Ireland, Tuohy was also managing Shamrock Rovers and was working as an area sales manager for HB Ice Cream. He was now the father of six children and financial pressures forced him to give up the Ireland job which only paid £500 a year.

=== Republic of Ireland U-19s ===
In 1981, Tuohy returned to international management after 6 years managing Dublin University and took the unpaid position as manager of the Republic of Ireland U-19 team. He was also managing Shelbourne. He appointed Brian Kerr as one of his assistants.

The Republic of Ireland national under-19 football team qualified for the 1982 UEFA European Under-18 Football Championship. They qualified again for the 1983 UEFA European Under-18 Football Championship, where despite remaining unbeaten in a group that included eventual winners France, they were eliminated. During the 1984 UEFA European Under-18 Championships, Tuohy guided a team that included Denis Irwin and Brian Mooney to the semi-finals, where they lost to the Soviet Union. They eventually finished fourth, after losing the third place play-off to Poland and this qualified them for the 1985 FIFA World Youth Championship. This was the best showing of any Irish team in an international competition, until Kerr guided the U-19s to victory in same competition in 1998. In February 1986, Tuohy resigned as the U-19 manager after he felt undermined by Jack Charlton, the new manager of the senior team. During a half-time team talk, Charlton had allegedly taken over and sidelined Tuohy.

== Statistics ==
=== Inter League goals ===
Date	Opponents	Result	Score	Competition	Venue	Attendance
12 February 1956	Hessenliga	W	4-1	friendly	Dalymount Park, Dublin	
17 March 1956	Irish League XI	W	1-0	friendly	Dalymount Park, Dublin	23,000
19 September 1956	Football League XI	D	3-3	friendly	Dalymount Park, Dublin	
26 September 1956	Scottish Football League XI	L	1-3	friendly	Shawfield	23,000
18 September 1957	Scottish Football League XI	L	1-5	friendly	Dalymount Park, Dublin	23,000
17 March 1960	Hessenliga	W	5-2	friendly	Dalymount Park, Dublin	
23 September 1964	Scottish Football League XI	D	2-2	friendly	Dalymount Park, Dublin	25,000

== Honours ==
=== Player ===
Shamrock Rovers:

League of Ireland: 4

- 1953–54, 1956–57, 1958–59, 1963–64

FAI Cup: 8

- 1955, 1956, 1964, 1965, 1966, 1967, 1968, 1969

League of Ireland Shield: 8

- 1954–55, 1955–56, 1956–57, 1957–58, 1963–64, 1964–65, 1965–66, 1967–68
- Leinster Senior Cup: 6
- 1955, 1956, 1957, 1958, 1964, 1969
- Dublin City Cup: 1
- 1966–67
- SWAI Personality of the Year: 1
- 1965–66

=== Manager ===
Dundalk

League of Ireland Shield: 1

- 1972
- Leinster Senior Cup: 1
- 1971

== Sources ==
- The Book of Irish Goalscorers by Seán Ryan & Stephen Burke 1987
