= 1961–62 FAI Cup =

1961-62 FAI Cup
Tournament details
- Country: Ireland
- Dates: 18 February – 28 April 1962

Final positions
- Champions: Shamrock Rovers (14th title)
- Runners-up: Shelbourne
- Semifinalists: Waterford; St Patrick's Athletic

The FAI Cup 1961–62 was the 41st edition of Ireland's premier cup competition, The Football Association of Ireland Challenge Cup or FAI Cup. The tournament began on 18 February 1962 and concluded on 28 April with the final held at Dalymount Park, Dublin. An official attendance^{[A]} of 32,000 people watched Shamrock Rovers win their 14th FAI Cup title by defeating local rivals and League Champions Shelbourne 4–1.

== First round ==
Tie no	Home team	Score	Away team	Date
1	Bohemians	1-1	Transport	18 February 1962
replay	Transport	1-3	Bohemians	21 February 1962
2	Cork Celtic	3-2	Dundalk	18 February 1962
3	Drumcondra	3-0	Ringmahon Rangers	18 February 1962
4	Limerick	2-3	St Patrick's Athletic	18 February 1962
5	Sligo Rovers	3-3	Shamrock Rovers	18 February 1962
replay	Shamrock Rovers	1-0	Sligo Rovers	28 February 1962
6	Waterford	2-1	Cork Hibernians	18 February 1962
7	Workman's Club	0-2	Shelbourne	18 February 1962
8	Pike Rovers	2-1	Longford Town	25 February 1962

== Second round ==
Tie no	Home team	Score	Away team	Date
1	Bohemians	0-1	Shamrock Rovers	11 March 1962
2	Pike Rovers	1-2	Shelbourne	11 March 1962
3	St Patrick's Athletic	1-0	Cork Celtic	11 March 1962
4	Waterford	2-0	Drumcondra	11 March 1962

== Semi-finals ==
13 April 1962

Shelbourne	3–0	St Patrick's Athletic
Hannigan (2); Wilson

Dalymount Park, Dublin

15 April 1962

Shamrock Rovers	1–1	Waterford
Hamilton		Sinnott

Dalymount Park, Dublin

=== Replay ===
18 April 1962

Shamrock Rovers	5–2	Waterford
Bailham (2); Ambrose; O'Neill		O'Neill; Dixon

Tolka Park, Dublin

== Final ==
28 April 1962

Shamrock Rovers	4–1	Shelbourne
Ambrose 37', 44'; Hamilton 63', 85'		Barber 31'

Dalymount Park, Dublin
Attendance: 32,000

Winner of FAI Cup 1961–62
Shamrock Rovers
14th Title

== Notes ==
A. Attendances were calculated using gate receipts which limited their accuracy as a large proportion of people, particularly children, attended football matches in Ireland throughout the 20th century for free by a number of means.
