= Ralph Bauer =

Ralph Bauer may refer to:

- Ralph Norman Bauer (1899–1963), member of the Louisiana House of Representatives
- Ralph S. Bauer (1867–1941), mayor of Lynn, Massachusetts
