= Manning Bowl =

Stadium in Lynn, Massachusetts, United States

- Interactive map of Manning Bowl
- Former names: Municipal Stadium (1937)
- Location: 76 Locust St, Lynn, Massachusetts
- Coordinates: 42.475147°N 70.954087°W
- Owner: Lynn, Massachusetts
- Operator: City of Lynn
- Capacity: 21,000 (American football and soccer)
- Surface: Grass

Construction
- Groundbreaking: September 1936
- Built: June 21, 1938
- Opened: November 24, 1937
- Renovated: 1974
- Closed: 2004
- Demolished: 2005
- Cost: $500,000 ($11.2 million in 2025 dollars)
- Architect: Cyril Harding

Tenants
- Lynn English (1937–2004); Lynn Classical (1937–2004); Lynn Trade High School/Lynn Tech (1937–2004); Saugus High School (1946); St. Mary's High School (1948–2004); Peabody High School (1955–1957); Boston Rovers (1967); Bay State Titans (1990)

Manning Bowl was an American football and soccer stadium located in Lynn, Massachusetts. It was the home stadium for Lynn English, Lynn Classical, Lynn Tech, St. Mary's High School, the Boston Rovers of the United Soccer Association in 1967, and the Bay State Titans of the Minor League Football System in 1990. Demolished in 2005, it was replaced by Manning Field built at the same location.

== High school football ==
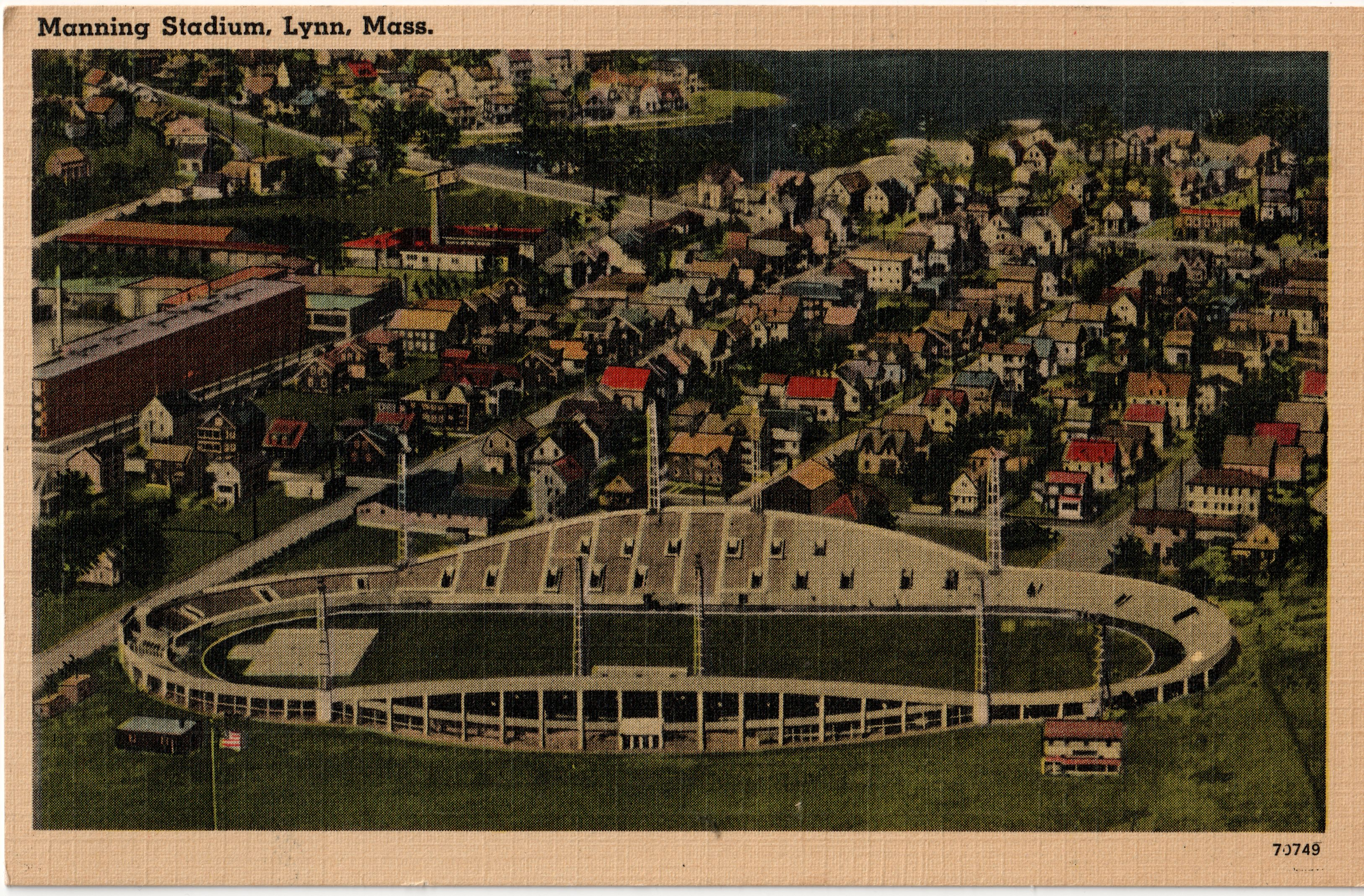
Manning Stadium in Lynn, Massachusetts in about the 1940s

Manning Bowl, a WPA project, opened on November 24, 1937 for the annual Thanksgiving Day football game between English and Classical. The stadium was not yet completed and was known only as Municipal Stadium. English defeated Classical 13–6 and Henry Pazik (father of future Major League pitcher Mike Pazik) scored the first touchdown in the stadium's history on a 33-yard pass play from Joe McNulty.

The stadium was completed on June 21, 1938 and named for mayor J. Fred Manning. The first football game held in the completed stadium was a night game between Peabody High School and Classical with Peabody winning 27–7.

In 1948, the city of Lynn became the first to televise high school football, in an arrangement with WNAC-TV in Boston.

The Harry Agganis All-Star Football Classic was played at Manning Bowl from 1956–1959 and again from 1965–2003.

The final game played at Manning Bowl was on November 25, 2004 and was the annual Thanksgiving Day game between English and Classical. English won the game 28–8. The final touchdown in Manning Bowl history was scored by Mike Orfanos on a 2-yard run.

=== Notable high school athletes who played at the Manning Bowl ===
- Jim Hegan, Quarterback Lynn English
- Mike Pazik, Quarterback, Lynn English
- Lou Tsioropoulos, Tight end, Lynn English
- Harry Agganis, Kicker/Halfback, Lynn Classical
- Boley Dancewicz, Quarterback, Lynn Classical
- Richard Fecteau, Offensive lineman, Lynn Classical
- Tony Conigliaro, Quarterback, St. Mary's
- Joe DiVito, Quarterback, St. Mary's
- Dick Jauron, Safety, Swampscott
- Bill Adams, Offensive lineman, Swampscott
- Billy Conigliaro, Running back, Swampscott
- Mark Bavaro, Tight end, Danvers
- Matt Bloom, Offensive line, Peabody
- Steve Lomasney, Quarterback, Peabody
- Doug Mackie, Offensive line, Saugus
- Art Spinney, Offensive line, Saugus
- Greg Landry, Quarterback, Nashua (NH)

== Professional football ==
On September 18, 1945, the Boston Yanks defeated the defending National Football League champion New York Giants 14–3 in an exhibition game at the Manning Bowl. The game was only attended by 8,500 due to poor weather. The Yanks returned to the Manning Bowl the following season for "Boley Dancewicz Night", which honored Yanks quarterback and Lynn native Frank "Boley" Dancewicz. The Yanks defeated the Long Island Indians of the American Football League 27–0 in front of 10,000 spectators. At halftime, Dancewicz was presented with a radio, watch, and a pen and pencil by Mayor Albert Cole.

In 1959, the Chicago Bears defeated the Philadelphia Eagles 24–21 in the Cardinal Cushing Charity Game. Future Hall of Fame quarterback Norm Van Brocklin started for Philadelphia.

The Boston Breakers of the United States Football League considered moving to the manning bowl after 1983 season, however the team moved to New Orleans instead.

The semi-pro Bay State Titans played their only season here. Defensive Tackle Eric Swann would be selected with the 6th overall pick in the 1991 NFL draft.

== College football ==
On September 26, 1953, the Manning Bowl was leased out for a college football contest that was nationally televised on NBC. 10,000 spectators and an estimated 80 million television viewers watched Holy Cross defeat Dartmouth 28–7.

== Concerts ==
The Rolling Stones kicked off their 1966 North American Tour at the stadium on June 24, 1966. Police cut the event short in response to crowd surge toward the stage.

On July 11, 1976, Ray Charles held a charity concert to raise money for the Life Institute. The Four Tops and Dorothy Moore also performed.

In 1984, the city of Lynn began hosting concerts at the Manning Bowl as a way to fund repairs to the Manning Bowl and Fraser Field. The Beach Boys performed at the stadium on September 23, 1984. Mötley Crüe drew 15,000 fans during an August 3, 1985, concert that also saw Accept and Y&T as opening acts. The concert was moved to Lynn after the Kingston, New Hampshire, board of selectmen decided that the town could not handle a concert of this size. Shortly after the Mötley Crüe concert, the city approved three more concerts; The Kinks, Aerosmith and Waylon Jennings. The Kinks performed at the stadium on September 8, 1985, and drew 7,000 people. Aerosmith performed at the stadium during their Done with Mirrors Tour on September 14, 1985. The concert drew 25,000 fans and saw 12 arrests and a traffic jam that tied up the city for several hours. On September 25, 1985, the Lynn city council unanimously voted to bar rock concerts from the Manning Bowl due to complaints from residents who lived near the Manning Bowl.

== Other events ==
The first official event held at the Manning Bowl was a citywide dance held on a specially made dance area in the end zone. This area was also used to show evening movies during the 1930s and 1940s.

The Manning Bowl hosted memorials following the deaths of Presidents Franklin D. Roosevelt and John F. Kennedy.

From 1966 to 1982, The Manning Bowl was home to Drum & Bugle Corps World Open Championship.

The Manning Bowl was the home stadium for the Boston Rovers during the United Soccer Association's only season. The league's first ever game was held here and ended in a 1–1 draw against the Detroit Cougars. Mick Leech scored for the Rovers.

The first ever Agganis All-Star Basketball Game was played here in 1976.

In 1978, Eddie Feigner hurled one of his 930 no-hitters in a game played on makeshift diamond.

In 1985, the Manning Bowl hosted two World Class Championship Wrestling events.
