= Sean Francis =

Sean Francis (or variants) may refer to:

- Sean Francis (footballer) (born 1972), former footballer
- Sean Francis (actor), actor
- Shaun Francis, Jamaican footballer
- Shawn Francis in 2014 USA Indoor Track and Field Championships
