= Frank O'Neill (footballer, born 1940) =

Irish footballer & manager (born 1940)

Personal information
- Full name: Frank Simon O'Neill
- Date of birth: 13 April 1940 (age 86)
- Place of birth: Dublin, Republic of Ireland
- Positions: Outside right; forward

Youth career
- 1952–1956: Stella Maris
- 1956–1958: Home Farm

Senior career*
Years	Team	Apps	(Gls)
1958–1961	Arsenal	2	(0)
1961–1974	Shamrock Rovers	274	(87)
1967	→ Boston Rovers (guest)	12	(3)
1974–1976	Waterford	26	(7)
1976	Athlone Town	5	(2)
1976–1978	Belgrove F.C.		
1978–1980	Dundalk	5	(1)
1980	St Patrick's Athletic	3	(0)

International career
1961–1971	Republic of Ireland	20	(1)
1961–1969	League of Ireland XI	15	(1)

Managerial career
- 1969–1971: Shamrock Rovers
- 1981: Shelbourne
- * Club domestic league appearances and goals

Frank O'Neill (born 13 April 1940) is an Irish former footballer who spent most of his career at Shamrock Rovers. As an international he also played for the Republic of Ireland.

== Playing career ==
=== Early years ===
O'Neill joined Stella Maris at the age of twelve before moving onto Home Farm. He also played for an FAI Youth Selection against a Liverpool County FA XI at Goodison Park, and in 1958 he played against the youth teams of some of the leading European clubs in a tournament in Germany.

=== Arsenal ===
O'Neill signed for Arsenal as an eighteen-year-old, initially as an amateur but subsequently turned professional in April 1959. He spent the next two seasons playing for Arsenal Reserves, making just 2 appearances in the English League. On both occasions, during the 1960–61 season, he deputised for the injured Danny Clapton. He made his senior debut for Arsenal on New Year's Eve 1960 in a 5–3 away win against Nottingham Forest and then played again in a home game against Blackpool.

=== Shamrock Rovers ===
O'Neill signed for Shamrock Rovers for £3000 in September 1961 after playing well on Rovers' tour of North America that summer. He scored twice on his debut against Waterford United on 17 September, in a 4–0 win in the League of Ireland Shield. He went on to become a prominent member of the Rovers team that won the FAI Cup six times in a row during the 1960s. He, along with Pat Courtney, is a holder of the six in a row medals. During his career with Rovers he played over 300 games. His teammates at the club during this era included Liam Tuohy, Johnny Fullam, Pat Dunne, Bobby Gilbert, Mick Leech and Paddy Mulligan. During the 1965–66 season O'Neill scored 6 goals during the FAI Cup run including one in the final against Limerick. In 1967, he also scored a penalty in the final, a 3–2 win against St. Patrick's Athletic. He scored a further 2 goals during the 1968–69 Cup run. During the summer of 1967, O'Neill also played for Rovers when they competed as Boston Rovers in the United Soccer Association league. O'Neill also scored 2 goals for Rovers, one in each game, during a European Cup Winners Cup tie against CA Spora Luxembourg, helping them to an 8–2 aggregate win. In total he played 18 times in European competition.

=== Other clubs ===
Frank signed for Waterford United in September 1974 and scored twice on his debut.

He won the Texaco Cup after scoring the only goal in the first leg in November 1974.

O'Neill signed for Dundalk as assistant manager in 1978. He moved to St Patrick's Athletic in January 1980.

=== Republic of Ireland ===
Between 1961 and 1971, while playing for Shamrock Rovers, O'Neill made 20 appearances and scored 1 goal for the Republic of Ireland. He holds the record for the number of international caps won by a League of Ireland player. He made his international debut on 8 October 1961 in a World Cup qualifier against Czechoslovakia at Dalymount Park. O'Neill finished on the losing side as the Republic lost 3–1. He scored his only goal for the senior national team on 11 November 1966 in a 2–1 home win against Turkey in a European qualifier. He made his last appearance for the Republic of Ireland on 10 October 1971 in another European qualifier, a 6–0 loss away to Austria.

== Managerial career ==
He served as player-manager for Shamrock Rovers after being appointed to the position on 19 October 1969. He guided the club to the league title play-off at the end of the 1970–71 season.

O'Neill was later assistant manager of Dundalk between 1978 and 1979, winning the League of Ireland and FAI Cup double.

== Honours ==
League of Ireland: 2

- Shamrock Rovers 1963–64
- Dundalk 1978–1979

FAI Cup: 7

- Shamrock Rovers 1962, 1964, 1965, 1966, 1967, 1968, 1969

League of Ireland Shield: 5

- Shamrock Rovers 1962–63, 1963–64, 1964–65, 1965–66, 1967–68
- Dublin City Cup: 2
- Shamrock Rovers 1963–64, 1966–67
- Blaxnit Cup
- Shamrock Rovers 1967–68
- Top Four Cup
- Shamrock Rovers 1965–66
- Leinster Senior Cup: 2
- Shamrock Rovers 1964, 1968/69
- Texaco Cup
- Waterford United 1974/75

== Sources ==
- Paul Doolan; Robert Goggins. The Hoops. ISBN 0-7171-2121-6.
- Who's Who of Arsenal (2007): Tony Matthews
