= John Keogh (footballer) =

Irish football player

Personal information
- Date of birth: 1 November 1940 (age 85)
- Place of birth: Dublin, Ireland
- Position: Right-back

Youth career
- Stella Maris

Senior career*
Years	Team	Apps	(Gls)
1958–1968	Shamrock Rovers	148	(2)
1968–1969	Cork Celtic	18	(1)
1969–1971	Dundalk	29	(0)

International career
1963–1966	League of Ireland XI	4	(0)
1966	Republic of Ireland	1	(0)
- * Club domestic league appearances and goals

John Keogh (born 1 November 1940) is an Irish former professional football player who played as a full back in the 1960s.

== Career ==
Keogh started his footballing career with Stella Maris. They won the Dublin District Schoolboys League Under 14, 15, 16 & 17. Keogh was the captain for the last two seasons. They also won the All-Ireland Under 15 title. Keogh was invited for trials at Chelsea, but returned home after a couple of months.

He joined Shamrock Rovers in 1958, where he made nine appearances in European competition. He made his debut in a Dublin City Cup game on 16 August 1959 .

A former youth and junior international, he also made one appearance for the Republic of Ireland national football team, on 4 May 1966, coming on as a substitute in a 4–0 defeat to West Germany at Dalymount Park .

"I received a telegram in work from Tom Scully, the Shamrock Rovers secretary, on the day of the game to be at Dalymount at 7pm that evening with my boots and shin-guards. I drove to out to Milltown from Finglas where I lived, but the place was locked up and there was no one there, so I had to climb over the wall, break in the door, grab my boots and climb out over the wall again. I stripped off in Dalymount and after a few minutes Theo Foley, who had been doubtful from the start, went down injured, and I was sent on and played very well."

Keogh shared his testimonial with Pat Courtney in May 1967 .

In January 1968, Keogh joined Cork Celtic F.C. for two seasons and lined up against his former club in the 1969 FAI Cup final. Alas, in his last final appearance, he scored an own goal in a 1-1- draw. And the Milltown club won the replay 4–1.

In 1969, he joined Dundalk for his last two seasons.

He received an Eircom Legend of Irish Football Award at halftime, during the World Cup qualifier game against Armenia at Croke Park on Wednesday, 14 October 2009.

== Sources ==
- Paul Doolan; Robert Goggins. The Hoops. ISBN 0-7171-2121-6.
- Stephen McGarrigle (1996). The Complete Who's Who of Irish International Football, 1945-96.
