= 1963–64 League of Ireland =

League of Ireland
- Season: 1963–64
- Champions: Shamrock Rovers (10th Title)
- Matches played: 132
- Goals scored: 475 (3.6 per match)
- Top goalscorer: Eddie Bailham, Shamrock Rovers (18)

Statistics of League of Ireland in the 1963/1964 season.

== Overview ==
It was contested by 12 teams, and Shamrock Rovers won the championship.

== Final classification ==
Pos	Team	Pld	W	D	L	GF	GA	GD	Pts	Qualification
1	Shamrock Rovers	22	14	7	1	68	27	+41	35	1964–65 European Cup
2	Dundalk	22	12	6	4	49	27	+22	30	
3	Limerick	22	12	6	4	46	32	+14	30	
4	Cork Celtic	22	9	8	5	49	36	+13	26	1964–65 European Cup Winners' Cup
5	St Patrick's Athletic	22	8	9	5	41	29	+12	25	
6	Cork Hibernians	22	9	7	6	38	31	+7	25	
7	Shelbourne	22	8	5	9	46	42	+4	21	1964–65 Inter-Cities Fairs Cup
8	Drumcondra	22	9	3	10	31	38	−7	21	
9	Sligo Rovers	22	6	7	9	30	53	−23	19	
10	Drogheda	22	5	6	11	31	44	−13	16	
11	Waterford	22	4	1	17	27	64	−37	9	
12	Bohemians	22	1	5	16	19	52	−33	7	

Source: www.rsssf.com

== Results ==
Home \ Away	BOH	CCF	CHF	DRO	DRU	DUN	LIM	SHM	SHE	SLI	StP	WAT
Bohemians	—	1–3	2–3	3–2	0–1	2–2	1–3	1–2	0–2	1–4	1–1	0–0
Cork Celtic	4–1	—	0–0	2–1	1–2	0–3	1–1	0–1	3–2	4–0	0–0	5–3
Cork Hibernians	2–0	1–3	—	3–2	2–0	1–1	4–1	0–0	0–0	3–2	1–1	2–1
Drogheda United	1–0	1–1	2–2	—	1–2	1–6	0–2	0–1	3–1	0–1	0–2	3–1
Drumcondra	2–1	3–4	1–0	1–1	—	0–4	1–2	1–1	2–0	3–0	3–3	0–1
Dundalk	0–0	2–1	4–2	6–2	1–0	—	4–2	2–1	1–1	0–0	3–2	3–0
Limerick	4–1	1–1	2–2	2–1	3–1	0–2	—	0–0	3–0	3–0	1–1	4–0
Shamrock Rovers	7–1	2–2	1–0	5–5	4–1	3–1	6–2	—	4–2	7–2	1–1	4–1
Shelbourne	3–0	3–3	2–3	0–0	4–1	3–1	1–2	0–4	—	6–0	3–2	4–2
Sligo Rovers	3–3	2–2	2–1	1–1	0–3	1–0	1–2	4–4	3–3	—	1–1	1–0
St Patrick's Athletic	1–0	3–2	2–0	1–2	1–3	1–0	2–2	0–0	5–2	6–1	—	4–1
Waterford	2–0	3–7	2–6	1–2	4–0	2–3	0–2	1–8	0–4	0–1	2–1	—

Legend: Blue = home team win; Yellow = draw; Red = away team win.

== Top scorers ==
Rank	Player	Club	Goals
1	Eddie Bailham	Shamrock Rovers	18
1	Jimmy Hasty	Dundalk	18
1	Johnny Kingston	Cork Hibernians	18
4	Ronnie Whelan	St Patrick's Athletic	17
5	Donal Leahy	Cork Celtic	16
6	Eric Barber	Shelbourne	15
7	Frank McCarthy	Cork Celtic	14
8	Mick Lynch	Waterford (6); Drumcondra (7)	13
8	Liam Tuohy	Shamrock Rovers	13
10	Paddy O'Rourke	Limerick	12
