= Tadhg Purcell =

Irish footballer

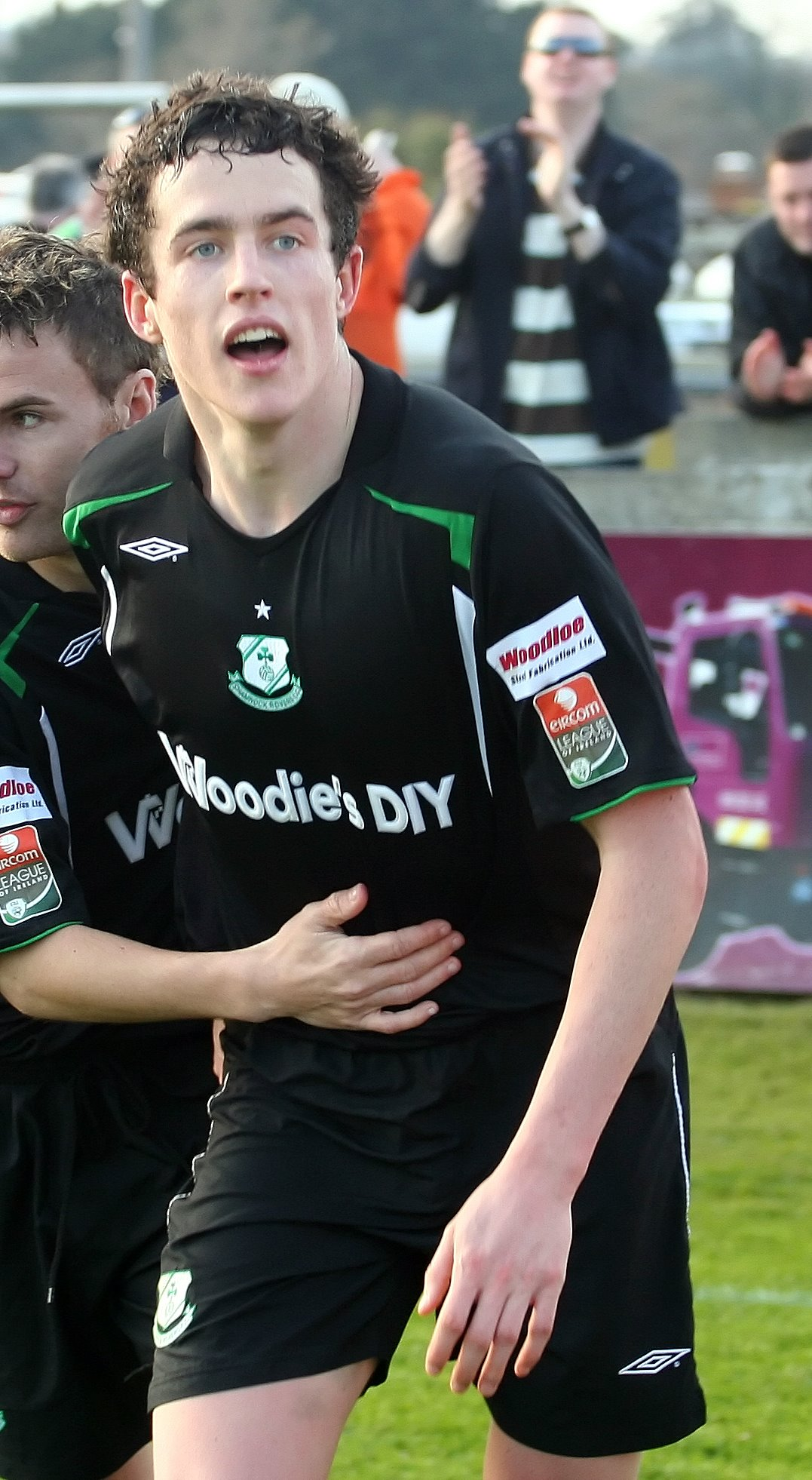
- Purcell playing for Shamrock Rovers in April 2007.

Personal information
- Full name: Tadhg Purcell
- Date of birth: 2 September 1985 (age 41)
- Place of birth: Sandyford, Ireland
- Height: 1.81 m (5 ft 11 in)
- Positions: Forward; winger

Youth career
- 2002–2004: Leicester Celtic
- 2004–2005: Kilkenny City

Senior career*
| Years | Team | Apps | (Gls) |
| 2005 | Kilkenny City | 35 | (10) |
| 2006–2009 | Shamrock Rovers | 112 | (30) |
| 2010 | Darlington | 22 | (9) |
| 2010–2012 | Northampton Town | 5 | (0) |
| 2011 | → Darlington (loan) | 5 | (1) |
| 2012 | → Cork City (loan) | 16 | (3) |
| 2013 | Marconi Stallions | 23 | (8) |
| 2014 | Rockdale City Suns | 20 | (2) |
| 2015–2018 | Northbridge | 72 | (14) |
| 2018 | Stanmore Hawks | 9 | (1) |
| 2018 | Dunbar Rovers | 9 | (2) |
| 2019 | Northbridge | 6 | (0) |
| 2020−202? | Coogee United | 18 | (1) |
- * Club domestic league appearances and goals as of 25 April 2021

Tadhg Purcell (born 2 September 1985) is an Irish former footballer. His main position was as a striker, although he could play on the wing.

He spent his youth with Leicester Celtic, before joining Kilkenny City in 2004. He moved onto Shamrock Rovers two years later, and enjoyed a successful three-year spell with the club, helping Shamrock to win the First Division title in 2006. He won a move to English club Darlington in January 2010, before joining Northampton Town six months later. He was loaned back to Darlington in September 2011, and later went out on loan to Irish side Cork City. He joined Australian side Marconi Stallions in March 2013, he then joined Rockdale City Suns in 2014, and North Shore Mariners in 2015. He's played his trade over the past seasons with other Sydney-based National Premier League teams Stanmore Hawks and Dunbar Rovers.

== Playing career ==
=== Early career ===
Tadhg Purcell played most his schoolboy career at Leicester Celtic, where he played alongside future teammate Barry Murphy. He also gained success with his St Benildus team, and was part of the under-18s Dublin Soccer champions team at St Benildus College in 2003, when they beat Malahide 1–0 in the final, which was held at Wayside Celtic's ground.

=== League of Ireland career ===
Tadgh Purcell originally received a soccer scholarship from University College Dublin (UCD AFC), where he played the beginning of his senior career. Following the end of his scholarship, Purcell moved to First Division side Kilkenny City, under the management of Pat Scully, for the 2005 season. He scored his first League of Ireland goal on 9 April at Buckley Park. After one season with the "Black Cats", he then moved to Shamrock Rovers for the 2006 season, along with his manager Scully, after Kilkenny City failed to gain promotion from the First Division.

He made his Rovers debut in the opening game of the 2006 season. Following a successful first season with the "Hoops", in which Rovers won the First Division title and Purcell became the club's top scorer with 12 goals, he signed a two-and-a-half-year contract in July 2007. The club finished fifth in the Premier Division the following season, and he was top-scorer again in 2007 after finding the net 12 times, also becoming the fourth highest scorer in the league. Scully left the club by mutual consent in October 2008, and was replaced by Michael O'Neill. Although first team opportunities became limited in 2008 he managed to make an impact in many league games but Purcell eventually departed the club in September 2009. He was the first substitute to appear at Tallaght Stadium, and also played as a substitute in a friendly against Real Madrid. His last goal for Rovers was his only goal in the 2009 season.

=== Darlington ===
Purcell signed for Steve Staunton's League Two club Darlington, along with former St Patrick's Athletic midfielder Gary Dempsey, in January 2010. He scored on his debut for the club on 19 January, in a 2–1 win over Rotherham United at the Don Valley Stadium. He also scored on his home debut in a 2–1 loss to Northampton Town. He scored nine goals in 22 games in 2009–10 to become the club's top scorer, as the "Quakers" suffered relegation out of the Football League. He rejected a new deal at The Darlington Arena following the club's relegation, despite new manager Simon Davey's attempts to retain him.

=== Northampton Town ===
Purcell signed a two-year contract with League Two side Northampton Town in June 2010. Manager Ian Sampson stated that: "He is a good finisher, has a lot of physical strength and understands the game. He is a major signing for us and we are delighted." On his first start of the season against Wycombe Wanderers, Purcell was stretchered off; it was later revealed that he would subsequently be ruled out for the remainder of the 2010–11 season with ruptured cruciate and lateral knee ligaments.

He joined former club Darlington on a one-month loan in September 2011, in what "Cobblers" boss Gary Johnson stated was an attempt to regain match fitness. He scored one goal in five Conference National appearances for the "Quakers", before returning to Sixfields. Purcell joined Tommy Dunne's League of Ireland side Cork City on a four-month loan in February 2012. He scored three goals in 16 Premier Division games during his stay at Turners Cross in the 2012 season. Although a permanent contract was offered Purcell decided to move back to the UK.

He joined Port Vale on trial in July 2012. He scored a hat-trick for the "Valiants" in a friendly against amateur side Alsager Town.

=== Australia ===
Purcell joined Australian club Marconi Stallions in March 2013. He later signed for Northbridge FC in 2015.

== Personal life ==
Purcell was raised in Sandyford, Dublin and obtained a degree in Science at undergraduate level, in University College Dublin (UCD) after leaving St Benildus College. Before going to St Benildus College he attended Catholic University School (CUS) for three years.

== Honours ==
Shamrock Rovers

- League of Ireland First Division: 2006
