= Ken DeMange =

Irish footballer (born 1964)

Personal information
- Full name: Kenneth John Philip Petit DeMange
- Date of birth: 3 September 1964 (age 62)
- Place of birth: Dublin, Ireland
- Height: 5 ft 9 in (1.75 m)
- Position: Midfielder

Youth career
- St Kevins CBS
- 1978–1983: Stella Maris
- Tolka Rovers

Senior career*
Years	Team	Apps	(Gls)
1981–1983	Home Farm	46	(7)
1983–1987	Liverpool	0	(0)
1986	→ Scunthorpe United (loan)	3	(2)
1987–1988	Leeds United	15	(1)
1988–1992	Hull City	68	(1)
1990–1991	→ Cardiff City (loan)	15	(0)
1992–1993	Limerick	28	(3)
1993	Ards	8	(1)
1993–1994	Bohemians	22	(1)
1994–1995	Dundalk	13	(3)
1995	Crusaders	0	(0)
1995–1996	Home Farm	?	(?)
Total		201	(19)

International career
1984–1987	Republic of Ireland U21	5	(1)
1989	Republic of Ireland U23	1	(0)
1987–1988	Republic of Ireland	2	(0)
1990	Republic of Ireland B	1	(0)
- * Club domestic league appearances and goals

Kenneth John Philip Petit DeMange (Note: DeMange's surname is often written in different ways. Some of these include De Mange and de Mange. However, most sources tend to write it as DeMange, hence its use in this article.) (born 3 September 1964) is an Irish former footballer who played for, among others, Liverpool, Leeds United, Hull City and Dundalk. As an international he also played for the Republic of Ireland.

== Club career ==
=== Early years ===
DeMange was raised in the Ballygall area of Northside Dublin. He first showed his potential as a schoolboy footballer, playing for St Kevins CBS, Stella Maris and Tolka Rovers before moving on to Home Farm where his teammates included Brian Mooney. Made his League of Ireland debut for Farm at Athlone Town on 8 November 1981. While playing for Home Farm, he was awarded the Young Player of the Year title for the 1982–83 season by the Professional Footballers Association of Ireland He also finished as the team's top goalscorer with seven goals.

=== Liverpool ===
In August 1983 DeMange, along with Brian Mooney, signed for Liverpool but in four seasons with the club, he never made a competitive first team appearance. He did however help Liverpool Reserves win two consecutive Central League titles in 1984 and 1985. During the 1984–85 season he was top scorer for the Reserves, scoring 12 goals in 32 league appearances. In December 1986 he also had a successful loan spell with Scunthorpe United, scoring 2 goals in 3 leagues appearances. He also played for Scunthorpe in 1 FA Cup game and scored 1 further goal. In May 1987, while still playing for Liverpool Reserves, he made his international debut for the Republic of Ireland.

=== Leeds United ===
In September 1987 DeMange was sold to Leeds United for a fee of £75,000. He subsequently scored on his debut for United, with a diving header, in a 2–0 win against Manchester City at Elland Road on 26 September 1987. However this was also the only goal he scored for the club. In his brief spell with United, DeMange went on to make 20 first team appearances, 15 of them in the league.

=== Hull City ===
In March 1988 DeMange was sold to Hull City for a fee of £65,000. He subsequently made 68 league appearances and scored 1 league goal for City. He also made a further 4 appearances for City in the FA Cup and 1 in the League Cup. In October 1988 he also won his second senior international cap while at City. In November 1990 and in March 1991 during loan spells with Cardiff City, he also made a further 15 league appearances.

=== Return to Ireland ===
After leaving Hull City in June 1992, DeMange returned to Ireland where he played for several clubs in both the League of Ireland and the Irish League. Playing for Limerick in the 1992-93 season, he helped the club with the League Cup. During the 1994–95 season he played for a Dundalk team managed by Dermot Keely and he helped the club win the League of Ireland title. During the campaign he scored 3 league goals, 2 against Monaghan United on 11 November 1994 in a 4–0 away win and 1 against Cobh Ramblers on 12 December 1994 in a 2–2 away draw.

== International career ==
DeMange played for the Republic of Ireland national under-19 football team that qualified for the 1982 UEFA European Under-18 Football Championship. In the finals he scored against Austria. He also played for the under-21, under-23, B and senior teams. While with Liverpool Reserves, he won 5 under-21 caps and while with Hull City he won an under-23 cap. In 1987 and 1988, under Jack Charlton, DeMange also made 2 substitute appearances for the senior Republic of Ireland team. On 23 May 1987 he made his senior debut when he came on for Mick McCarthy during a 1–0 win against Brazil at Lansdowne Road. He won his second cap on 19 October 1988 in another home game against Tunisia. DeMange came on for Tony Cascarino and helped the Republic win 4–0. He won his only B cap on 27 March 1990 in a 4–1 win against England B at Turner's Cross, coming on as a very late substitute for Alan McLoughlin.

== Honours ==
Home Farm

- FAI Youth Cup: 1983
- PFAI Young Player of the Year: 1982–83

Liverpool Reserves

- Central League: 1983–84, 1984–85

Limerick

- League of Ireland Cup: 1992–93

Dundalk

- League of Ireland: 1994–95
- League of Ireland Cup runners-up: 1994–95
- Leinster Senior Cup: 1994–95
