= Pat Courtney =

Irish former footballer

Personal information
- Full name: Patrick Courtney
- Date of birth: 1940 (age 85–86)
- Place of birth: Dublin, Ireland
- Position: Left back

Youth career
- Mulvey Celtic

Senior career*
Years	Team	Apps	(Gls)
1958–1971	Shamrock Rovers	250	(2)

International career
1962–1967	League of Ireland XI	4	(0)
- * Club domestic league appearances and goals

Pat Courtney (born 1940) is an Irish former footballer who played as a full back, mainly on the left.

== Career ==
He joined Shamrock Rovers in 1958 and made his debut in a League of Ireland Shield game on 27 September 1959.

He played in 17 European games including appearances in the European Champion Clubs' Cup, Inter-Cities Fairs Cup and the UEFA Cup Winners' Cup. He played in 16 consecutive European games from 1962 until injury made him miss the win over FC Schalke 04 in 1969. He played against Valencia CF, SK Rapid Wien, Real Zaragoza and FC Bayern Munich amongst others.

He represented the League of Ireland 4 times between 1962 and 1967 and was also an amateur cap.

Courtney shared a testimonial with John Keogh (footballer) in May 1967.

He left Glenmalure Park at the end of the 1970/71 season.

== Honours ==
- League of Ireland: 1
  - Shamrock Rovers - 1963/64
- FAI Cup: 7
  - Shamrock Rovers - 1962, 1964, 1965, 1966, 1967, 1968, 1969
- League of Ireland Shield: 5
  - Shamrock Rovers - 1962/63, 1963/64, 1964/65, 1965/66, 1967/68
- Leinster Senior Cup: 2
  - Shamrock Rovers - 1964, 1969
- Dublin City Cup: 2
  - Shamrock Rovers - 1963/64, 1966/67
- Top Four Cup:
  - Shamrock Rovers - 1965/66
- Blaxnit Cup
  - Shamrock Rovers 1967-68

== See also ==
- One-club man.

== Sources ==
- Paul Doolan; Robert Goggins. The Hoops. ISBN 0-7171-2121-6.
