= Mick Smyth =

Irish footballer (born 1940)

Personal information
- Full name: Michael Smyth
- Date of birth: 13 May 1940 (age 86)
- Place of birth: Dublin, Ireland
- Position: Goalkeeper

Youth career
- St. Patrick's C.Y.M.S.

Senior career*
Years	Team	Apps	(Gls)
1960–1962	Drumcondra	?	(0)
1962–1964	Barrow AFC	8	(0)
1964	Altrincham	18	(0)
1964–1970	Shamrock Rovers	112	(0)
1967	→ Boston Rovers (loan)	0	(0)
1970–1979	Bohemians	193	(0)
1979–1982	Athlone Town	82	(0)
1982–1983	Shamrock Rovers	1	(0)

International career
1968	League of Ireland XI	1	(0)
1968	Republic of Ireland	1	(0)
- * Club domestic league appearances and goals

Mick Smyth (born 13 May 1940) was an Irish soccer player who played for Drumcondra, Shamrock Rovers, Bohemians and Athlone Town in the League of Ireland throughout the 1960s, 1970s and 1980s and had a short spell in England with Barrow in the early 1960s.

He made his Rovers debut at Drogheda on 27 December 1964 and kept a clean sheet. A dominant goalkeeper, he won five FAI Cup winners medals in a row with Rovers from 1965 to 1969. After making 12 appearances in European competition for the Milltown club he left to join Bohemians in May 1971. He won two league winners medals in 1974/75 and 1977/78 and was named Irish Football Personality of the Year in 1977. He made 16 appearances in European competition for Bohs. Played in 136 competitive games in a row for Bohs between December 1973 until the April 1979.

Along with Johnny Fullam he signed for Athlone in August 1979. He signed back for Rovers in August 1982. He earned one cap for Ireland in 1968 against Poland. On 25 November 2008 his medals were stolen.

== Honours ==
- League of Ireland: 3
  - Bohemians - 1974–75, 1977–78
  - Athlone Town - 1980/81
- FAI Cup: 6
  - Shamrock Rovers - 1965, 1966, 1967, 1968, 1969
  - Bohemians - 1976
- League of Ireland Cup:3
  - Bohemians - 1975
  - Athlone Town - 1979/80, 1981/82
- Leinster Senior Cup (association football):1
  - Athlone Town - 1979/80
- Top Four Cup
  - Shamrock Rovers 1966
- Dublin City Cup
  - Shamrock Rovers 1966/67
- Blaxnit Cup
  - Shamrock Rovers 1967-68
- SWAI Personality of the Year
  - Bohemians - 1976/77

== Sources ==
- Paul Doolan; Robert Goggins. The Hoops. ISBN 0-7171-2121-6.
