= J. Fred Manning =

American politician

39th Mayor of Lynn, Massachusetts
- In office 1930–1939
- Preceded by: Ralph S. Bauer
- Succeeded by: Albert Cole

Personal details
- Born: September 17, 1875 Lynn, Massachusetts
- Died: December 6, 1955 (aged 80) Lynn, Massachusetts
- Resting place: St. Mary's Cemetery; Lynn, Massachusetts

J. Fred Manning (September 17, 1875 – December 6, 1955) was a Massachusetts politician who served as the 39th Mayor of Lynn, Massachusetts.

He attended Lynn English High School. He was mayor of Lynn from 1930 to 1939. He died in 1955, at the age of 80, in Lynn. The Manning Bowl, Lynn's football stadium from 1938 to 2004 was named for Manning. Manning Field, Lynn's current football stadium was named for Manning.

Political offices
Preceded by Ralph S. Bauer	Mayor of Lynn, Massachusetts; 1930 to 1939	Succeeded by Albert Cole
