= Stella Maris F.C. =

Irish association football club in Dublin

- Full name: Stella Maris Football Club
- Founded: 1943
- Ground: Dublin Port Stadium Richmond Road; Clonturk Park; Albert College Park
- President: Johnny Giles
- Chairman: Sean Kavanagh
- League: Dublin & District Schoolboy League; Dublin Women's Soccer League; Leinster Senior League
- Website: http://www.stellamarisfc.yourclub.ie/
Home colours	Away colours

Stella Maris Football Club is an Irish association football club based in Drumcondra, Dublin. Founded in 1943, the club caters for over 350 children, ranging in age from 5 to 18 years. Some thirty coaches and managers train, organise and oversee the teams and academy run by the club. The club enters several teams in the Dublin & District Schoolboy League and the Leinster Senior League. Stella Maris is best known for its youth system which has successfully produced dozens of players who have gone on to play for clubs throughout Ireland and the United Kingdom. Many have also gone on to represent the Republic of Ireland at international level. Its name is Latin and means "Star of the Sea" in English.

== History ==
=== Moore and Whelan ===
One of Stella Maris' earliest coaches was Paddy Moore. During the 1940s and early 1950s, when Moore coached Stella Maris, he nurtured the talents of future Republic of Ireland international Ronnie Whelan Sr. Whelan was initially "discovered" by Moore's wife, who then brought him to the attention of her husband. Whelan was one of the early success stories of the Stella Maris academy.

=== Milk Cup ===
Stella Maris have been regular participants in the Milk Cup, playing against the youth teams of among others, Feyenoord, Manchester United, Manchester City, Everton, Blackburn Rovers and Middlesbrough as well as national youth teams representing Wales, Estonia and Slovakia. On 27 July 1994, Glen Crowe scored a hat-trick as Stella Maris defeated Estonia 8–0 in a Milk Cup game.

== Women's teams ==
Stella Maris has also fielded women's teams in both the Dublin Women's Soccer League and the FAI Women's Cup. Republic of Ireland women's internationals Stephanie Roche and Áine O'Gorman are both former Stella Maris players.

== Home ground ==
In May 2014, Stella Maris opened a new clubhouse and a new 3G pitch at their base at Richmond Road. The facilities were officially opened by two former players, Johnny Giles and Eamon Dunphy, who were joined at the opening ceremony by Football Association of Ireland (FAI) chief John Delaney. Stella Maris also plays matches at a number of local pitches based at Clonturk Park and Albert College Park.

== Notable former players ==
Republic of Ireland internationals

- (Republic of Ireland) John Anderson
- (Republic of Ireland) Keith Andrews
- (Republic of Ireland) Stephen Carr
- (Republic of Ireland) Jimmy Conway
- (Republic of Ireland) Glen Crowe
- (Republic of Ireland) Ken DeMange
- (Republic of Ireland) Stephen Elliott
- (Republic of Ireland) Gerry Daly
- (Republic of Ireland) Eamon Dunphy
- (Republic of Ireland) Tony Dunne
- (Republic of Ireland) Pat Dunne
- (Republic of Ireland) Noel Dwyer
- (Republic of Ireland) Johnny Giles
- (Republic of Ireland) Ashley Grimes
- (Republic of Ireland) Eoin Hand
- (Republic of Ireland) John Keogh
- (Republic of Ireland) Joe Murphy
- (Republic of Ireland) Joey O'Brien
- (Republic of Ireland) Liam O'Brien
- (Republic of Ireland) David O'Leary
- (Republic of Ireland) Pierce O'Leary
- (Republic of Ireland) Frank O'Neill
- (Republic of Ireland) Liam Tuohy
- (Republic of Ireland) Ronnie Whelan Sr.
- (Republic of Ireland) Shaun Williams

Republic of Ireland women's internationals

- (Republic of Ireland) Stephanie Roche
- (Republic of Ireland) Aine O'Gorman

Republic of Ireland B internationals

- (Republic of Ireland) Vinny Arkins
- (Republic of Ireland) Dessie Baker
- (Republic of Ireland) Brian Mooney
- (Republic of Ireland) Richie Byrne

Republic of Ireland U23 international

- (Republic of Ireland) Brian Mooney

Republic of Ireland U21 internationals

- (Republic of Ireland) Vinny Arkins
- (Republic of Ireland) Dessie Baker
- (Republic of Ireland) Richie Baker
- (Republic of Ireland) Barry Conlon
- (Republic of Ireland) Liam Dunne
- (Republic of Ireland) Dave Henderson
- (Republic of Ireland) Trevor Malloy
- (Republic of Ireland) Brian Mooney
- (Republic of Ireland) Richie Partridge

League of Ireland XI representatives

- (Republic of Ireland) Vinny Arkins
- (Republic of Ireland) Kevin Brady
- (Republic of Ireland) Noel King
- (Republic of Ireland) Brian Mooney

Republic of Ireland managers

- (Republic of Ireland) Eoin Hand
- (Republic of Ireland) Johnny Giles
- (Republic of Ireland) Noel King
- (Republic of Ireland) Liam Tuohy
- (Republic of Ireland) Mick Cooke (football manager)

League of Ireland managers

- (Republic of Ireland) Roddy Collins
- (Republic of Ireland) Stephen Henderson
- (Republic of Ireland) Gary Cronin
- (Republic of Ireland) Mick Cooke

Actors

- (Republic of Ireland) Gabriel Byrne

== Notable former managers ==
- (Republic of Ireland) Paddy Moore 1940s

== Honours ==
- FAI Youth Cup
  - Winners: 1973–74, 1993–94: (Note: http://www.fai.ie lists Stella Maris as 1993–94 winners. The FAI Yearbook & Diary 1995 omits the 1993–94 final. Other sources including, the Tipperary Southern & District Football League website, claims St. Michael's won the cup in both 1993–94 and 1994–95) 2
  - Runners-up: 1947–48, 1998–99: 2
- FAI Under-17 Cup
  - Winners: 1982–83: 2
  - Runners-up: 1981–82, 1986–87, 1993–94: 2
