= Kevin Brady (footballer) =

Irish footballer (born 1962)

Personal information
- Date of birth: 12 February 1962 (age 64)
- Place of birth: Dublin, Ireland
- Position: Defender

Youth career
- Stella Maris

Senior career*
Years	Team	Apps	(Gls)
1981–1983	Bohemians	26	(1)
1983–1988	Shamrock Rovers	84	(1)
1988–1991	Derry City		
1991–1994	Shelbourne		
1994–1995	Ards	16	(0)
1995–1997	Bohemians		
1997	Derry City		
1997–1999	Dundalk		
- * Club domestic league appearances and goals

Kevin Brady (born 2 December 1962) is an Irish former footballer.

Brady played his schoolboy football with Stella Maris before joining Bohemians (2 spells), Shamrock Rovers, Derry City, Shelbourne and Dundalk in the League of Ireland. He also had a spell at Ards in the Irish League where he made 30 appearances.

Brady moved to Milltown in 1983 and was a vital part of the success over the next four years, making 140 total appearances scoring once. He won 4 League of Ireland titles, 3 FAI Cups and made 6 appearances in European competition for the Hoops. He also played for the League of Ireland XI in 7 Olympic qualifiers.

He transferred to Derry in July 1988 where he won the treble in 1989.

He signed for Shelbourne in 1991 and helped them win their first league title in his first season and won the FAI Cup with them the following season as they defeated Dundalk at Lansdowne Road. He moved on to Ards before returning to his first club Bohemians in the summer of 1995.

Brady re-signed for Derry in July 1997 and played in the Champions League qualifiers before signing for Dundalk a few months later.

== Honours ==
- League of Ireland: 6
  - Shamrock Rovers 1983/84, 1984/85, 1985/86, 1986/87
  - Derry City 1988/89
  - Shelbourne 1991/92
- FAI Cup: 5
  - Shamrock Rovers 1985, 1986, 1987
  - Derry City 1989
  - Shelbourne 1993
- League of Ireland Cup
  - Derry City 1988/89
- LFA President's Cup: 2
  - Shamrock Rovers – 1984/85, 1987/88

== Sources ==
- Paul Doolan; Robert Goggins. The Hoops. ISBN 0-7171-2121-6.
- Robert Goggins. The Four-in-a-Row Story.
