= Ralph S. Bauer =

American politician

Ralph Sherman Bauer

38th Mayor of Lynn, Massachusetts
- In office 1926–1930
- Preceded by: Harland A. McPhetres
- Succeeded by: J. Fred Manning

Delegate to the 1917 Massachusetts Constitutional Convention
- In office June 6, 1917 – August 13, 1919

Personal details
- Born: January 31, 1867 Provincetown, Massachusetts, US
- Died: July 13, 1941 (aged 74) Lynn, Massachusetts, US
- Spouse: Fannie Miller

Ralph Sherman Bauer (January 31, 1867 – July 13, 1941) was a Massachusetts politician who served as the 38th Mayor of Lynn, Massachusetts.

== Early life ==
Bauer was born in Provincetown, Massachusetts. He attended Alfred University and graduated from Boston University in 1889.

== Newspaper career ==
In 1889, Bauer became the assistant manager of the New York Herald. He later served as circulation manager of the Chicago Herald and Post and from 1893 to 1898 he was the business manager of the St. Louis Star. In 1894 he married Fannie Miller in Chicago.

In 1898, Bauer returned to Massachusetts. He purchased a stationer's store in Lynn that also sold newspapers and periodicals. He eventually became the largest deliverer of newspapers north of Boston.

== Civic activity ==
Bauer organized the Essex County Board of Trade and the Lynn Chamber of Commerce. He also active in the creation of the Lynn Independent Shoemaking School and the Essex County Agricultural School. He was also part of a group that urged the state to build Lynn Shore Drive. In October 1919, Bauer was selected by Governor Calvin Coolidge to be part of the delegation that greeted the rulers of Belgium on their visit to Boston.

=== 1917 Massachusetts Constitutional Convention ===
In 1916 the Massachusetts legislature and electorate approved a calling of a Constitutional Convention. In May 1917, Bauer was elected to serve as a member of the Massachusetts Constitutional Convention of 1917, representing the Massachusetts Seventh Congressional District.

=== Mayor of Lynn ===
Bauer did not run for office again until 1925, when he was elected Mayor of Lynn. He ran a low-key, non-partisan campaign that focused on reigning in government spending. He defeated attorney John V. Phelan by 3,052 votes.

Bauer was described by The Boston Daily Globe's Louis M. Lyons of "[ruling] Lynn with an iron hand. Mussolini has scarcely a freer hand and more direct personal Government than Ralph S. Bauer". Upon taking office, Bauer took over city's purchasing department in order to better control municipal spending. In his first year, he refused to issue a supplementary budget and instead reminded city department heads of a $1,000 legal penalty for any official who spent beyond his appropriation. He eliminated paid holiday's for city employees by finding an ordinance that had never been enforced. Bauer refused to start any new street construction and instead initiated a program of street patching. He shut down the city incinerator after the maintenance costs were found to be twice what had been estimated. He instead sold garbage collection rights and made a profit. Bauer took away keys to office buildings from the police department on the grounds that officers loafed inside at night instead of patrolling. He also had the police department take the census instead of hiring outside census takers. In order to get more ideas for economy in city government, Bauer held a contest among city employees.

Bauer also declared war on "petting parties" by ordering the police to break up mixed parties on Flax Pond or Sluice Pond after 11 pm and open any automobiles they find parked in Lynn Woods with the curtains down. He also sought to reduce crime by increasing fees on pool tables, theatre licenses, and peddlers. In 1926 he ordered that the city's beauty parlors remain closed on Sundays. In 1929, he ordered the police to arrest any female over the age of 12 who refused to wear full-length stockings.

Bauer also led a movement to replace the city's post office. He and 50 other businessmen purchased a lot near the railroad station and presented it to the federal government. He got the Congressional Committee on Post Offices to place Lynn near the top of the list for a new post office.

Political offices
| Preceded by Harland A. McPhetres | Thirty Eighth Mayor of Lynn, Massachusetts; 1926-1930 | Succeeded by J. Fred Manning |
