= John McGovern =

John McGovern may refer to:

== Sportspeople ==
- John McGovern (American football) (1886–1963), American football quarterback for the University of Minnesota
- John McGovern (footballer, born 1949), European Cup winning captain
- John McGovern (footballer, born 2002), Irish footballer
- Johnny McGovern (1932–2022), Irish hurler

== Others ==
- John McGovern (politician) (1887–1968), British Independent Labour Party politician
- John McGovern (VC) (1825–1888), Irish recipient of the Victoria Cross
- John P. McGovern (1921–2007), Houston allergist, investor and philanthropist
- Jonny McGovern (born 1975), comic
- John McGovern, actor in the 1961 film Splendor in the Grass
- John Wilder (producer) (born 1936), actor and producer formerly known as Johnny McGovern
