= 1953–54 League of Ireland =

League of Ireland
- Season: 1953–54
- Champions: Shamrock Rovers (7th title)
- Matches played: 132
- Goals scored: 462 (3.5 per match)
- Top goalscorer: Daniel Jordan (14 goals)
- Biggest home win: Shamrock Rovers 10–2 Cork Athletic
- Biggest away win: St Patrick's Athletic 1–4 Bohemians; St Patrick's Athletic 2–5 Waterford; Waterford 1–4 Bohemians
- Highest scoring: Shamrock Rovers 10–2 Cork Athletic

The 1953–54 League of Ireland was the 33rd season of senior football in the Republic of Ireland.

Shelbourne were the defending champions.

== Changes from 1952–53 season ==
No new teams were elected to the League.

== Teams ==
Locations of the 1953–54 League of Ireland teams

Team	Location	Stadium
Bohemians	Dublin (Phibsborough)	Dalymount Park
Cork Athletic	Cork (Mardyke)	Mardyke
Drumcondra	Dublin (Drumcondra)	Tolka Park
Dundalk	Dundalk	Oriel Park
Evergreen United	Cork (Turners Cross)	Turners Cross
Limerick	Limerick	Markets Field
Shamrock Rovers	Dublin (Milltown)	Glenmalure Park
Shelbourne	Dublin (Ringsend)	Shelbourne Park
Sligo Rovers	Sligo	The Showgrounds
St Patrick's Athletic	Dublin (Inchicore)	Richmond Park
Transport	Bray	Carlisle Grounds
Waterford	Waterford	Kilcohan Park

== Season overview ==
Shamrock Rovers won their seventh title.

== Final classification ==
Pos	Team	Pld	W	D	L	GF	GA	GD	Pts
1	Shamrock Rovers	22	11	8	3	44	20	+24	30
2	Evergreen United	22	11	6	5	44	29	+15	28
3	Drumcondra	22	10	7	5	37	25	+12	27
4	Cork Athletic	22	11	3	8	40	46	−6	25
5	Limerick	22	8	8	6	42	43	−1	24
6	Shelbourne	22	10	3	9	35	35	0	23
7	Waterford	22	8	6	8	45	45	0	22
8	Bohemians	22	8	4	10	41	36	+5	20
9	Sligo Rovers	22	8	4	10	33	37	−4	20
10	Transport	22	7	4	11	42	49	−7	18
11	St Patrick's Athletic	22	4	7	11	27	43	−16	15
12	Dundalk	22	4	4	14	32	54	−22	12

Source: RSSSF, foot.dk

== Results ==
Home \ Away	BOH	CAT	DRU	DUN	EVE	LIM	SHM	SHE	SLI	StP	TRA	WAT
Bohemians	—	3–1	0–2	4–1	2–2	4–1	0–2	2–2	4–1	1–2	1–1	1–2
Cork Athletic	2–1	—	2–0	2–1	2–1	4–1	3–1	1–0	2–2	2–2	3–2	0–2
Drumcondra	1–2	1–1	—	4–0	3–0	0–0	1–1	1–0	2–1	7–2	0–2	1–0
Dundalk	3–2	1–2	1–3	—	2–2	3–1	1–3	1–2	2–1	1–1	3–0	2–2
Evergreen United	2–0	3–0	2–1	4–1	—	4–4	1–1	1–0	3–1	3–1	2–1	3–1
Limerick	0–1	3–2	2–2	5–2	0–3	—	1–1	2–1	2–0	2–0	4–4	2–2
Shamrock Rovers	1–0	10–2	2–3	1–0	1–0	1–1	—	4–1	2–1	0–0	2–0	7–1
Shelbourne	1–0	2–1	3–0	1–0	1–1	2–3	1–1	—	2–0	2–1	3–2	3–1
Sligo Rovers	2–2	2–0	2–2	3–2	2–1	3–2	1–0	2–3	—	2–1	3–0	3–0
St Patrick's Athletic	1–4	0–2	1–1	6–1	0–2	2–2	0–1	2–1	0–0	—	2–0	2–5
Transport	5–3	3–4	1–2	3–2	3–2	1–2	1–1	5–2	3–1	0–0	—	5–3
Waterford	1–4	5–2	0–0	2–2	2–2	1–2	1–1	4–2	2–0	4–1	4–0	—

Source: extratime.com
Legend: Blue = home team win; Yellow = draw; Red = away team win.

== Top goalscorers ==
Rank	Player	Club	Goals
1	(Republic of Ireland) Daniel Jordan	Bohemians	14
2	(Republic of Ireland) Paddy Ambrose	Shamrock Rovers	13
3	(Republic of Ireland) Christy Bergin	Waterford	12
3	(Republic of Ireland) Eddie Doran	Evergreen United	12
5	(Republic of Ireland) Joey Dunne	Bohemians	11
5	(Republic of Ireland) Paddy Gilbert	Limerick	11
5	(Republic of Ireland) Joe Martin	Dundalk	11
5	(Republic of Ireland) Brendan Treacy	Transport	11
9	(Republic of Ireland) Dessie Glynn	Drumcondra	10
9	(Republic of Ireland) Stephen McDonagh	Sligo Rovers	10
9	(Republic of Ireland) Johnny Vaughan	Cork Athletic	10
