= Sean Francis (footballer) =

English footballer (born 1972)

Personal information
- Full name: Sean Robert Francis
- Date of birth: 1 August 1972 (age 54)
- Place of birth: Birmingham, England
- Position: Forward

Team information
- Current team: Kildare Town AFC
- Number: 9

Youth career
- 1988–1990: Birmingham City

Senior career*
Years	Team	Apps	(Gls)
1990–1992	Birmingham City	6	(0)
1991–1992	→ Cobh Ramblers	12	(5)
1992–1993	Telford United	34	(7)
1993	→ Worcester City	?	(1)
1993	Northampton Town	1	(0)
1993–1995	Cobh Ramblers	60	(14)
1995–2002	Shamrock Rovers	144	(42)
1998–1999	→ Cobh Ramblers	28	(9)
2002–2004	Longford Town	53	(14)
2004–2005	Kildare County	24	(7)
2012–present	Kildare Town	?	(?)

International career
1994	League of Ireland XI	1	(0)
- * Club domestic league appearances and goals

Sean Robert Francis (born 1 August 1972) is a former footballer who played in the Football League for Birmingham City and Northampton Town, and in the League of Ireland for Cobh Ramblers, Shamrock Rovers and Longford Town. He played as a forward.

== Career ==
Francis was born in Birmingham. He began his football career as a trainee with Birmingham City in 1988, and turned professional with that club in 1990. He made his Football League debut on 19 January 1991, as a substitute in a 3–0 defeat to Cambridge United in the Third Division, and made two more appearances from the bench that season. He spent time on loan at League of Ireland club Cobh Ramblers, for whom he made a scoring debut at home to UCD on 6 October 1991, before returning to Birmingham to make three more substitute appearances without scoring.

He joined Telford United of the Conference in July 1992, and played on loan for Worcester City in the Southern League, scoring once. At the beginning of the 1993–94 season, he played once for fourth-tier club Northampton Town, before moving to Ireland to rejoin Cobh Ramblers.

Francis joined Shamrock Rovers in 1995 and made his debut in August against St James's Gate. He went on to spend eight seasons at Rovers, during which he played twice in the 1998 UEFA Intertoto Cup. and twice in the 2002–03 UEFA Cup.

In October 1998 he went back to Cobh Ramblers on loan for the season.

Francis joined Longford Town in November 2002 and scored in that season's FAI Cup Final at Lansdowne Road as Longford won the first senior title in their history.

In August 2004 Francis moved to Kildare County F.C. His last League of Ireland goal was scored at St Colman's Park on 21 May 2005. He retired at the end of the 2005 League of Ireland season.

He served as the assistant manager of Waterford United until May 2008.

Francis is playing Saturday evening over-35s football with Kildare town AFC starting as their center forward, and has led them to double league and cup win during their 2013–2014 season.

== Honours ==
- FAI Cup: 1
  - Longford Town 2003
- FAI Super Cup: 1
  - Shamrock Rovers 1998
