= Mick Leech =

Irish footballer & manager (born 1948)

Personal information
- Full name: Michael Leech
- Date of birth: 6 August 1948 (age 78)
- Place of birth: Dublin, Ireland
- Position: Forward

Youth career
- 1964–1966: Ormeau

Senior career*
Years	Team	Apps	(Gls)
1966–1973	Shamrock Rovers	143	(74)
1966	→ Limerick (loan)	1	(0)
1967	→ Boston Rovers (loan)	5	(2)
1973–1976	Waterford	60	(33)
1976–1978	Shamrock Rovers	27	(9)
1978	Bohemians	1	(0)
1978–1980	Drogheda United	38	(16)
1980	→ Saint Brendan's A.F.C. (loan)	?	(?)
1980	→ Shelbourne (loan)	5	(0)
1980	St Patrick's Athletic	7	(0)
1981	Hammond Lane F.C.	?	(?)
1981–1983	Dundalk	2	(0)

International career
1969–1972	Republic of Ireland	8	(2)
1969–1972	League of Ireland XI	4	(1)

Managerial career
- 1985–1990: Garda
- 1990–1991: Athlone Town
- * Club domestic league appearances and goals

Michael "Mick" Leech (born 6 August 1948) is an Irish former professional footballer who played as a forward. He made his name with Shamrock Rovers in the 1960s.

== Club career ==
Leech was signed by Paddy Ambrose and Liam Tuohy for Shamrock Rovers in September 1966 from junior side Ormeau. He spent six weeks in the reserves before he made his first team debut against Dundalk at Milltown on New Year's Day 1967. Rovers drew 1–1 and Leech was substituted by Billy Dixon in the second half. Leech scored his first goal for the Hoops on 4 January 1967. He played his first FAI Cup tie for Rovers in the semi-final against Dundalk and scored Rovers' goal as they drew 1–1. The Hoops made no mistake in the replay as Leech scored twice in a 3–0 win. He went to score the second equaliser in the final against St Patrick's Athletic and Leech had his first Cup medal while still a teenager. That summer, Rovers toured the United States as Boston Rovers and at the tours end he, along with Paddy Mulligan were offered terms by the locals.

In 1968, Leech again stamped his mark on the Cup, scoring twice both in the semi-final and the final. It was during the following season, 1968–69, that Leech really stormed on the scene as he notched up an incredible total of 55 goals during the season. These included two in the Cup final replay against Cork Celtic. He was top league goal scorer that season with 19 goals. Leech became disheartened with the game and left Rovers, in a swap deal for Waterford's Tommy McConville in December 1973.

He returned to Milltown in September 1976 when Seán Thomas signed him, and the following month, he scored his 250th goal in senior football when his 30-yard shot in the last minute beat Sligo in Rovers' only win to date in the League Cup. When Johnny Giles took over the following season, Leech did not figure in his plans and he moved to Bohemians. He later played for Drogheda United, Dundalk and St Patrick's Athletic. He later went into management, serving as assistant manager at Dundalk in the 1981–82 season and as manager of Athlone Town in the 1990–91 season.

== International career ==
He played eight times for the Republic of Ireland, scoring twice. His international debut came on 4 May 1969 in a 2–1 defeat to Czechoslovakia in a World Cup qualifier in Dalymount Park. He also earned four Inter-League caps, scoring once.

Liam Tuohy managed the Irish team that took part in the mini World Cup in Brazil in 1972 and said two of the best players he had were Leech and Mick Martin.

In December 1975, Leech played in an exhibition game at Croke Park.

== Personal life ==
His son Mark Leech and brother Bobby also played for Shamrock Rovers.

== Career statistics ==
=== International goals ===
#	Date	Venue	Opponent	Score	Result	Competition
1.	11 June 1972	Estádio do Arruda, Recife, Brazil	Iran	2–1	Win	Brazil Independence Cup
2.	25 June 1972	Estádio do Arruda, Recife, Brazil	Portugal	2–1	Loss	Brazil Independence Cup
Correct as of 22 February 2017

== Sources ==
- Paul Doolan; Robert Goggins. The Hoops. ISBN 0-7171-2121-6.
