= Eddie Bailham =

Irish footballer

Personal information
- Full name: Edward Bailham
- Date of birth: 8 May 1941
- Place of birth: Dublin, Ireland
- Date of death: 18 December 2016 (aged 75)
- Position: Forward

Senior career*
Years	Team	Apps	(Gls)
1959–1960	Cork Hibernians	6	(1)
1960–1964	Shamrock Rovers	66	(49)
1964–1967	Cambridge City	92	(68)
1967	Worcester City	32	(15)
1967–1972	Wimbledon	133	(53)
1972–1973	Cambridge City	61	(28)
1973–1974	Bexley United		
1974–1975	Chesham United		

International career
1962–1964	League of Ireland XI	4	(4)
1964	Republic of Ireland	1	(0)
- * Club domestic league appearances and goals

Eddie Bailham (8 May 1941 – 18 December 2016) was an Irish footballer who played as a forward.

== Club career ==
After an apprenticeship at Manchester United, and at the same time as Johnny Giles, he returned home to play for Home Farm. In August 1959, he signed for Cork Hibernians.

Bailham joined Shamrock Rovers in 1960 and as a striker, he was top scorer in the League of Ireland on two occasions, 1961–62 and 1963–64. On 20 August 1962, Bailham scored his only headed goal for the Hoops in a 5–5 draw against Drumcondra. In February 1963, he scored four times as Rovers hammered Bohemians 7–1 at Glenmalure Park. In August 1963, he scored a hat trick of penalties in a 4–1 win over Limerick.

Bailham played 5 times in European competition for the Milltown club. He scored a hat-trick in his last game for the Hoops on 27 September 1964. He scored 49 league and 12 FAI Cup goals in the Hoops.

Bailham emigrated to London shortly after, but as he was still technically a Shamrock Rovers player, he could not sign for an English league team. He joined Cambridge City and also had spells at Worcester and Wimbledon. He was the Southern League Premier Division top scorer in 1965–66 with 37 goals.

== International career ==
Bailham had a "glorious representative debut" scoring for the League of Ireland XI in the 2–1 defeat of an English League XI in October 1963 He scored 4 goals in 4 total Inter-League appearances between 1962 and 1964.

He won his one and only senior cap for the Republic of Ireland on 24 May 1964 in a 3–1 defeat to England at Dalymount Park.

== Sources ==
- Paul Doolan; Robert Goggins. The Hoops. ISBN 0-7171-2121-6.
