= Pat Dunne =

Irish footballer and manager (1943–2015)

Personal information
- Date of birth: 9 February 1943
- Place of birth: Dublin, Ireland
- Date of death: 25 September 2015 (aged 72)
- Position: Goalkeeper

Youth career
- 1959–1960: Everton

Senior career*
Years	Team	Apps	(Gls)
1960–1962	Everton	0	(0)
1962–1964	Shamrock Rovers	29	(0)
1964–1967	Manchester United	45	(0)
1967–1970	Plymouth Argyle	152	(0)
1967	→ Boston Rovers (loan)	12	(0)
1970–1978	Shamrock Rovers	158	(2)
1978–1980	Thurles Town	?	(0)
1980–1981	Shelbourne	2	(0)
Total		?	(2)

International career
1965–1966	Republic of Ireland	5	(0)
1966	Republic of Ireland U23	1	(0)
- * Club domestic league appearances and goals

Patrick Dunne (9 February 1943 – 25 September 2015) was an Irish professional football goalkeeper. He played internationally for the Republic of Ireland and professionally in both Republic of Ireland and England.

== Career ==
Dunne played in Dublin with Stella Maris before playing in England for Everton. He returned to Ireland to play with the Shamrock Rovers, making his debut, along with Jackie Mooney against Shelbourne at Dalymount Park on 22 August 1962. He played in the UEFA Cup Winners' Cup that season and the Inter-Cities Fairs Cup the following season against Valencia giving him a total of 4 European appearances. During this season Pat played in all 22 league games where Rovers only lost once winning every trophy except the Top Four Cup.

He left Milltown to join Manchester United in May 1964 for a fee of £10,500, winning a league title medal in his first season. Dunne made his debut for the Republic of Ireland in a World Cup qualifier against Spain at Dalymount Park in May 1965. He played in the first ever Republic of Ireland U23 game in 1966

In February 1967 he joined Plymouth Argyle, costing the Devon side £5,000. Dunne was Argyle's player of the season in 1967–68. Pat was a guest player on Rovers' American tour in the summer of 1967 where he was voted goalkeeper of the tournament.

He rejoined Rovers in November 1970. He became the first player to be shown a red card in League of Ireland football when he was sent off on 1 September 1974 in a League Cup match against Shelbourne. During this time he even started taking penalties for the club scoring one against Cork Hibs on 10 December 1972.

Pat Dunne travelled to Japan in September 1975 with the Rovers team that played three matches on that tour and they beat the Japanese international side 3–2 in one of them. He vied with Alan O'Neill for the goalkeeping spot over the next two seasons but when Johnny Giles arrived in the summer of 1977 it wasn't long before Pat was on his way from Rovers. Pat played in Giles' first match in charge in August 1977 but he left during the season and became player-manager of Thurles Town. Later was player-manager at Shelbourne, finally retiring from playing in 1981 after a career stretching some 20 years.

On the international front Pat made one Under-23 appearance for his country, against France in 1965. In total he won five full caps, three against Spain, and kept one clean sheet.

Pat's son Derek, also a goalkeeper, played briefly for Waterford United in 1989.

In 2004 Dunne was appointed as goalkeeping coach at Shamrock Rovers. On 5 November 2004, Dunne collapsed on the pitch during the warm up before the match against local rivals Bohemians.

In October 2006 Dunne was sued over allegations of assault.

Dunne died on 25 September 2015 after a short illness.

== Honours ==
- FA Charity Shield:
  - Manchester United - 1965 (shared)
