= Johnny Fullam =

Irish footballer

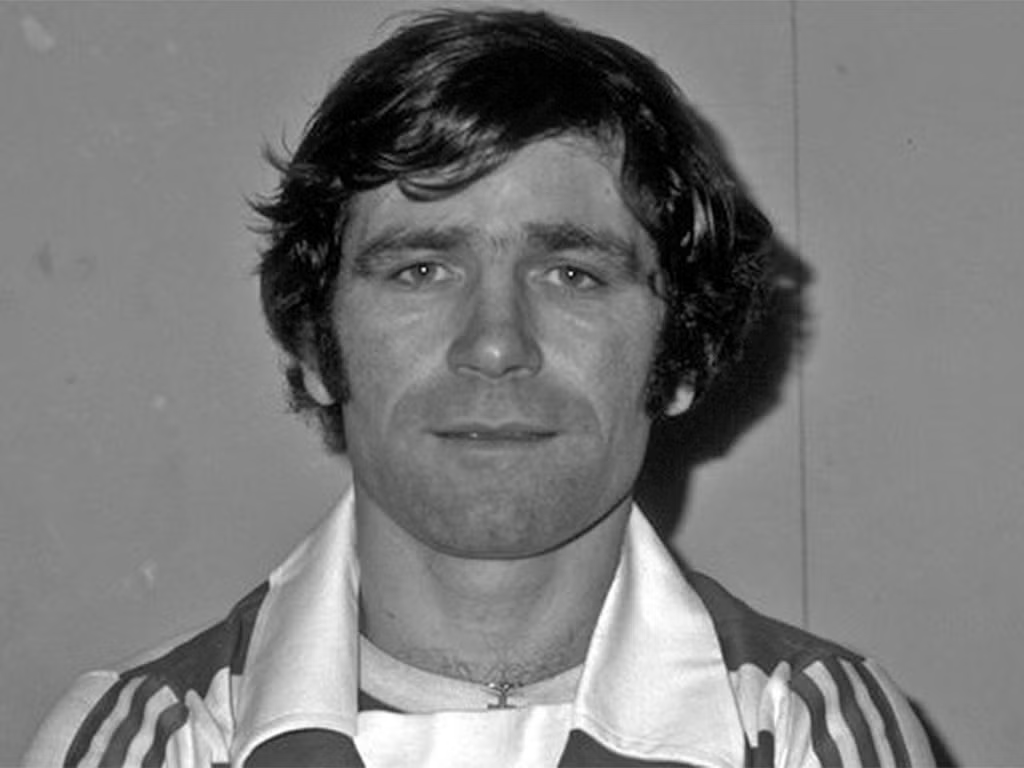

Personal information
- Full name: John Rowan Fullam
- Date of birth: 22 March 1940
- Place of birth: Dublin, Ireland
- Date of death: 10 June 2015 (aged 75)
- Place of death: Dublin, Ireland
- Position: Wing-half

Youth career
- 1956–1958: Home Farm

Senior career*
Years	Team	Apps	(Gls)
1958–1961	Preston North End	49	(6)
1961–1969	Shamrock Rovers	148	(21)
1967	→ Boston Rovers (loan)	?	(0)
1969–1976	Bohemians	174	(13)
1976–1979	Shamrock Rovers	80	(3)
1979–1980	Athlone Town	30	(1)
Total		?	(44)

International career
1960–1969	Republic of Ireland	11	(1)
- * Club domestic league appearances and goals

John Rowan Fullam (22 March 1940 – 10 June 2015) was an Irish association footballer.

== Career ==
Born in Dublin, Fullam began his career at Home Farm before signing for Preston North End in 1958. He scored 6 goals in 49 league appearances for Preston.

In 1961 he was asked to guest on Shamrock Rovers tour of America on the understanding that he would sign for the club. He scored his first goal in a competitive match from the penalty spot against Transport in a League of Ireland Shield game on 20 August 1961. He suffered a serious knee injury in February 1962 and missed Rovers FAI Cup win that season.

He made his European debut in the UEFA Cup Winners' Cup against PFC Botev Plovdiv and won his first Shield medal in 1962/63. Johnny was a regular member of Rovers' all-conquering side of 1963/64 when the Hoops almost made a clean sweep of the domestic trophies. He was one of five Rovers' players who were on the League of Ireland XI side that beat the English Football League side 2–1 at Dalymount Park on 2 October 1963. Just over a week later he played against Valencia CF and the Rovers drew 2–2.

Johnny won the first of his six FAI Cup medals with Rovers in 1964 and in the replayed final the following year he scored the winner. He scored against Real Zaragoza in the Inter-Cities Fairs Cup in 1965. The following year he scored again in Europe in the 4–1 win over Spora Luxembourg and had two great games against FC Bayern Munich where Rovers were seven minutes from putting the eventual winners of the competition.

He was on the mark in Europe again in 1968 against Randers FC but a knee injury he received in March 1969 kept him out of Rovers' record making six-in-a-row FAI Cup Final win. He signed for Bohemians shortly after and won yet another FAI Cup in his first season at Dalymount Park. In 1975, he won the League with Bohs and picked up another FAI Cup in 1976. He made 8 appearances in European competition for Bohs. He signed back for Rovers in the 1976 close season and captained the Milltown club to his eighth FAI Cup win in 1978. He was given a free transfer by Johnny Giles at the end of the 1978/79 season.

Fullam finished his League of Ireland career at Athlone Town, signing for them with Mick Smyth in August 1979. His last League of Ireland game was the final game of the 1979–80 League of Ireland season at St Mel's Park when Limerick United won the league.

He played well over 400 League of Ireland games. He had played for Rovers for eleven seasons in two spells and he was a worthy recipient of the Shamrock Rovers Hall of Fame award in 1991. He earned 11 caps playing for Republic of Ireland national football team, 10 while with Rovers. He holds the Rovers record for the most European appearances with 19 scoring the aforementioned 3 goals.

== Honours ==
- League of Ireland: 2
  - Shamrock Rovers – 1964
  - Bohemians – 1975
- FAI Cup: 8
  - Shamrock Rovers – 1964, 1965, 1966, 1967, 1968, 1978
  - Bohemians – 1970, 1976
- League of Ireland Shield: 1
  - Shamrock Rovers – 1964
- League of Ireland Cup: 1
  - Shamrock Rovers – 1976/77
- Leinster Senior Cup: 2
  - Shamrock Rovers – 1964, 1968/69
- Dublin City Cup: 2
  - Shamrock Rovers – 1964, 1966/67
- Top Four Cup: 1
  - Shamrock Rovers 1966
- Blaxnit Cup: 1
  - Shamrock Rovers 1967–68
- LFA President's Cup:
  - Bohemians 1974/75
- SWAI Personality of the Year: 2
  - Shamrock Rovers – 1967/68
  - Bohemians – 1974/75
- Hall of Fame: 1
  - Shamrock Rovers – 1990/91
