= Boston Shamrock Rovers =

Defunct American soccer club

- Full name: Boston Shamrock Rovers
- Nickname: Rovers
- Founded: 1966
- Dissolved: 1968; 58 years ago
- Stadium: Manning Bowl, Lynn, Massachusetts
- Capacity: 21,000
- Owner: Weston Adams
- Head coach: Liam Tuohy
- League: USA
- 1967: 6th. of Eastern Division
Home colors

Boston Shamrock Rovers (also known as Boston Rovers) were an American soccer team that competed in the United Soccer Association (USA) league in 1967. The team was based in Lynn, Massachusetts and played their home games at the Manning Bowl. The team folded when the USA merged with the National Professional Soccer League to form the North American Soccer League.

== History ==
In 1966 several groups of entrepreneurs were exploring the idea of forming a professional soccer league in United States. One of these groups, United Soccer Association (USA) led by Jack Kent Cooke, selected 12 cities for team locations and Weston Adams, owner of the Boston Bruins, was awarded the Boston franchise. The USA originally planned to start play in the spring of 1968; however the rival National Professional Soccer League, which secured a TV contract from CBS, announced it was ready to launch in 1967. Not wanting to let the rival league gain an advantage, the USA decided to launch early. Not having secured any player contracts, the league imported teams from Europe, Brazil, and Uruguay. Shamrock Rovers F.C. of the League of Ireland were brought over to represent the city of Boston.

Rovers opened the season at home against the Detroit Cougars (Note: The Northern Irish team Glentoran F.C. had been brought over to represent Detroit) in a 1 – 1 draw. A disallowed goal by the Cougars due to an offsides call led to an argument with the linesman who was hit in the face by a Detroit player. Shamrock Rovers finished the season in last place of the Eastern Division with a record of 2 wins 3 ties and 7 loses, the worst in the league, and with an average attendance 4,171.

Prior to the 1968 season the United Soccer Association merged with the National Professional Soccer League to form the North American Soccer League. The merged league decided not to have two-team cities and, as such, the incoming Boston Beacons from the NPSL would be Boston's NASL franchise.

== Media coverage ==
The Rovers were among the few United Soccer Association sides with television and radio coverage. WCOP carried three live home matches. WKBG-TV covered four matches, all on tape delay, 3 home and one (at Chicago) away. Fred Cusick and Seamus Malin provided TV commentary.

== Year-by-year ==
Season	Regular season												Playoffs	Top scorer		
Season	League	Div	G	W	T	L	F	A	Pts	%	Pos	Attend.	Playoffs	Name	Gls	Pts
1967	USA	E	12	2	3	7	12	26	7	.292	6th	4,171	–	Frank O'Neill	3	10

=== Match results ===
Win Draw Loss

May 27 1967	Boston Shamrock Rovers	1–1	Detroit Cougars	Lynn, MA
	Mick Leech (30')	Report	John Colrain (85')	Stadium: Manning Bowl; Attendance: 7,343; Referee: Dan Graven

May 31	Boston Shamrock Rovers	0–0	New York Skyliners	Lynn, MA
				Stadium: Manning Bowl; Attendance: 3,850

June 4	Boston Shamrock Rovers	0–1	Cleveland Stokers	Lynn, MA
			Maurice Setters (88')	Stadium: Manning Bowl; Attendance: 5,250

June 7	Detroit Cougars	1–0	Boston Shamrock Rovers	Detroit, MI
	Arthur Stewart (footballer) (79')			Stadium: Tiger Stadium (Detroit); Attendance: 648

June 11	Vancouver Royals	1–0	Boston Shamrock Rovers	Vancouver
	John O'Hare (21')			Stadium: Empire Stadium (Vancouver); Attendance: 7,616

June 14	Chicago Mustangs	5–0	Boston Shamrock Rovers	Chicago, Illinois
	Francesco Rizzo (footballer) (7'); Roberto Boninsegna (20'), (67'); Giuseppe Longoni (29'); Bruno Visentin (37')			Stadium: Comiskey Park; Attendance: 3,016

June 18	Boston Shamrock Rovers	3–4	San Francisco Golden Gate Gales	Lynn, MA
	Liam Tuohy (footballer); Frank O'Neill (footballer); Paddy Mulligan		Henk Houwaart (2); René Pas; Harry Heynen	Stadium: Manning Bowl; Attendance: 853

June 21	Boston Shamrock Rovers	1–4	Dallas Tornado	Lynn, MA
	Liam Tuohy (footballer) (39')		Finn Seemann (22'); Mogens Berg (29'), (82'); Jackie Graham (36')	Stadium: Manning Bowl; Attendance: 1,929

June 25	Los Angeles Wolves	1–1	Boston Shamrock Rovers	Los Angeles, California
	Terry Wharton (81')		Frank O'Neill (footballer) (21')	Stadium: Los Angeles Memorial Coliseum; Attendance: 6,936

July 2	Boston Shamrock Rovers	3–1	Houston Stars	Lynn, MA
	Bobby Gilbert; Billy Dixon; Liam Tuohy (footballer)		Jaime Corrêa Freitas	Stadium: Manning Bowl; Attendance: 5,800

July 5	Toronto City	6–1	Boston Shamrock Rovers	Toronto, Ontario
	Colin Grant (footballer) (3); Jim Scott (footballer); Peter Cormack; Colin Stein		Mick Leech	Stadium: Varsity Stadium; Attendance: 3,152

July 8	Washington Whips	1–2	Boston Shamrock Rovers	Washington, D.C.
	Frank Munro		Frank O'Neill (footballer); Billy Dixon	Stadium: D.C. Stadium; Attendance: 9,760

== See also ==
- Boston Beacons
- Boston Minutemen
- New England Tea Men

== Sources ==
- The Hoops by Paul Doolan and Robert Goggins (ISBN 0-7171-2121-6)
