= Paddy Mulligan =

Irish footballer and manager

Personal information
- Full name: Patrick Martin Mulligan
- Date of birth: 17 March 1945 (age 81)
- Place of birth: Beaumont, Dublin, Ireland
- Position: Right-back

Youth career
- Home Farm

Senior career*
Years	Team	Apps	(Gls)
1963	Bohemians	2	(0)
1963–1969	Shamrock Rovers	73	(2)
1967	→ Boston Rovers (guest)	6	(1)
1968	→ Boston Beacons (guest)	21	(4)
1969–1972	Chelsea	58	(2)
1972–1975	Crystal Palace	57	(2)
1975–1979	West Bromwich Albion	109	(1)
1979–1980	Shamrock Rovers	16	(1)
1983–1984	Galway United	3	(0)
Total		345	(13)

International career
1966	Republic of Ireland U23	1	(0)
1969–1979	Republic of Ireland	50	(1)
1965–1979	League of Ireland XI	6	(0)

Managerial career
- 1980–82: Panathinaikos A.O. (assistant)
- 1983–84: Galway United
- 1985–86: Shelbourne
- * Club domestic league appearances and goals

Patrick Martin Mulligan (born 17 March 1945) is an Irish retired footballer who played mainly as a right-back.

== Playing career ==
Mulligan started his senior career playing for Bohemians in 1963. However, after only two games he signed for Shamrock Rovers in December 1963. He made his competitive debut in a 7–1 win over Bohemians on 26 January 1964 and scored his first goal for the Hoops on 23 August 1964 in a 4–0 League of Ireland Shield win over his old club.

He won the FAI Cup in 1965, 1966, 1967 and 1969. During the 1963–64 season he was part of the side which won seven trophies. He represented Rovers in European competition 10 times. In the summer of 1967 he was part of the Rovers team that represented Boston in the United Soccer Association league. In 1968, they sent him on loan to the Boston Beacons of the North American Soccer League.

On 22 October 1969, Mulligan signed for English club Chelsea for £17,500. He featured in Chelsea's UEFA Cup Winners' Cup success in 1971, making a late substitute appearance in the first final against Real Madrid in Athens. He also played in Chelsea's League Cup final against Stoke City a year later, though they lost 2–1 at Wembley.

Mulligan left Chelsea in 1972 for Crystal Palace. He stayed with the South London club for three years (his personal highlight was scoring two goals in the famous 5–0 victory over Manchester United in 1972). He signed for West Brom after his spell at CPFC. Mulligan re-joined Shamrock Rovers in 1979, making his final appearance on 24 February 1980. He had his testimonial in August 1980. He then joined Panathinaikos as assistant manager

During his time at Rovers he won 10 caps for the Irish national team, including three as captain, one under-23 cap and six Inter league caps. Overall, he won 50 caps for his country.

== Managerial career ==
Mulligan managed League of Ireland sides Galway United (during the 1983–84 season) and Shelbourne during the first half of the 1985–86 season. He also applied to manage the Irish national team, but lost out to Eoin Hand by a single vote. One FAI committee member later said he had voted against Mulligan because he thought Mulligan had thrown a bun at him on a past away trip.

== After football ==
He occasionally appears as a soccer analyst on Irish television channel TV3 as well as the website of radio station Newstalk.

== Honours ==
Shamrock Rovers

- FAI Cup: 1965, 1966, 1967, 1969
- Top Four Cup: 1966
- Dublin City Cup: 1966–67
- Leinster Senior Cup: 1968–69

Chelsea

- European Cup Winners' Cup: 1970–71
- Football League Cup runner-up: 1971–72
