= Paddy Ambrose =

Irish footballer (1928–2002)

Personal information
- Full name: Patrick Ambrose
- Date of birth: 17 October 1928
- Place of birth: Clontarf, Dublin, Ireland
- Date of death: 22 February 2002 (aged 73)
- Place of death: Clontarf, Dublin, Ireland
- Position: Forward

Senior career*
Years	Team	Apps	(Gls)
1949–1965	Shamrock Rovers	211	(109)

International career
1954–1958	League of Ireland XI	7	(1)
1954–1964	Republic of Ireland B	2	(0)
1958	Republic of Ireland	5	(1)
- * Club domestic league appearances and goals

Patrick Ambrose (17 October 1928 – 22 February 2002) was an Irish professional football player and coach.

Ambrose was from Dublin, Ireland. Signed by Jimmy Dunne from junior side Clontarf, he was associated with Shamrock Rovers from 1948 to 1973, firstly as a player and then as a coach.

He made his debut against Transport in Bray on 28 August 1949 in a Dublin City Cup game.

He was one of the club's best ever strikers. During his career at Rovers he scored 109 League goals which is a club record. He was the leading scorer at the club in 1953–54, 1954–55, 1955–56 (20 goals) and 1960–61.

When Rovers won the title in 1953–54, their first title for fifteen years, Ambrose scored 13 goals. He won a League medal with Shamrock Rovers four times, in 1953–54, 1956–57, 1958–59 and 1963–64.

He played in six FAI Cup finals plus one replay and won four winner's medals in the following years, 1955, 1956, 1962 and 1964. He made six appearances in European competition for Rovers.

The man who became famous for wearing the green and white hooped number nine shirt was capped by Ireland five times, scoring once, also earning two B caps and one amateur international cap for the Republic of Ireland national football team.

Ambrose shared a testimonial with Gerry Mackey in May 1959.

The great service of Ambrose to Rovers was marked by the presentation of a gold medal by the directors. This was a medal which was presented to any Rovers player who had 15 consecutive years service to the club.

At the end of the 2012 League of Ireland season Ambrose is joint thirty third in the all-time League of Ireland goalscoring list with 109 league goals
