= List of League of Ireland top scorers =

This is a list of League of Ireland top scorers.

== A Division (1921–1985) ==
Season	Player	Club	Goals
1921–22	(Republic of Ireland) Jack Kelly	St James's Gate	11
1922–23	(Republic of Ireland) Bob Fullam	Shamrock Rovers	27
1923–24	(England) Dave Roberts	Bohemians	20
1924–25	(Republic of Ireland) Billy Farrell	Shamrock Rovers	25
1925–26	(Republic of Ireland) Billy Farrell	Shamrock Rovers	24
1926–27	(Republic of Ireland) David Byrne	Shamrock Rovers	17
	John McMillan	Shelbourne	17
1927–28	(England) Charles Heinemann	Fordsons	24
1928–29	Eddie Carroll	Dundalk	17
1929–30	Johnny Ledwidge	Shelbourne	16
1930–31	(Scotland) Alex Hair	Shelbourne	29
1931–32	(Scotland) Pearson Ferguson	Cork	21
	Jack Forster	Waterford	21
1932–33	George Ebbs	St James's Gate	20
1933–34	(Republic of Ireland) Alf Rigby	St James's Gate	13
1934–35	(Republic of Ireland) Alf Rigby	St James's Gate	17
1935–36	(England) Jimmy Turnbull	Cork	37
1936–37	Robert Sclater	Shelbourne	20^{(Note a)}
1937–38	Willie Byrne	St James's Gate	25
1938–39	(Republic of Ireland) Paddy Bradshaw	St James's Gate	22
1939–40	(Republic of Ireland) Paddy Bradshaw	St James's Gate	29
1940–41	(Republic of Ireland) Mick O'Flanagan	Bohemians	19
1941–42	Tommy Byrne	Limerick	20
1942–43	(Republic of Ireland) (Ireland) Sean McCarthy	Cork United	16
1943–44	(Republic of Ireland) (Ireland) Sean McCarthy	Cork United	16
1944–45	(Republic of Ireland) (Ireland) Sean McCarthy	Cork United	26
1945–46	Paddy O'Leary	Cork United	15
1946–47	(Republic of Ireland) Paddy Coad	Shamrock Rovers	11
	(England) Alf Hanson	Shelbourne	11
1947–48	(Republic of Ireland) (Ireland) Sean McCarthy	Cork United	13
1948–49	Bernard Lester	Transport	12
	Eugene Noonan	Waterford	12
	Paddy O'Leary	Cork Athletic	12
1949–50	(Scotland) David McCulloch	Waterford	19
1950–51	(Republic of Ireland) Dessie Glynn	Drumcondra	20
1951–52	(Republic of Ireland) Shay Gibbons	St Patrick's Athletic	26
1952–53	(Republic of Ireland) Shay Gibbons	St Patrick's Athletic	22
1953–54	Danny Jordan	Bohemians	14
1954–55	(Scotland) Jimmy Gauld	Waterford	30
1955–56	(Republic of Ireland) Shay Gibbons	St Patrick's Athletic	21
1956–57	(Republic of Ireland) Tommy Hamilton	Shamrock Rovers	15
	(Republic of Ireland) Donal Leahy	Evergreen United	15
1957–58	(Republic of Ireland) Donal Leahy	Evergreen United	16
1958–59	(Republic of Ireland) Donal Leahy	Evergreen United	22
1959–60	(Republic of Ireland) Austin Noonan	Cork Celtic	27
1960–61	(Northern Ireland) Dan McCaffrey	Drumcondra	29
1961–62	(Republic of Ireland) Eddie Bailham	Shamrock Rovers	21
1962–63	Mick Lynch	Waterford	12
1963–64	(Republic of Ireland) Eddie Bailham	Shamrock Rovers	18
	Jimmy Hasty	Dundalk	18
	Johnny Kingston	Cork Hibernians	18
1964–65	(Republic of Ireland) Jackie Mooney	Shamrock Rovers	16
1965–66	Mick Lynch	Waterford	17
1966–67	Johnny Brooks	Sligo Rovers	15
	(Northern Ireland) Danny Hale	Dundalk	15
1967–68	(England) Carl Davenport	Cork Celtic	15
	(Republic of Ireland) Ben Hannigan	Dundalk	15
1968–69	(Republic of Ireland) Mick Leech	Shamrock Rovers	19
1969–70	(Northern Ireland) Brendan Bradley	Finn Harps	18
1970–71	(Northern Ireland) Brendan Bradley	Finn Harps	20
1971–72	(Republic of Ireland) Alfie Hale	Waterford	22
	(England) Tony Marsden	Cork Hibernians	22
1972–73	(Republic of Ireland) Alfie Hale	Waterford	20
	(Northern Ireland) Terry Harkin	Finn Harps	20
1973–74	(Republic of Ireland) Terry Flanagan	Bohemians	18
	(Republic of Ireland) Turlough O'Connor	Bohemians	18
1974–75	(Northern Ireland) Brendan Bradley	Finn Harps	21
1975–76	(Northern Ireland) Brendan Bradley	Finn Harps	29
1976–77	(England) Sid Wallace	Waterford	16
1977–78	(Republic of Ireland) Turlough O'Connor	Bohemians	24
1978–79	(Republic of Ireland) John Delamere	Shelbourne	17^{(Note b)}
1979–80	(Republic of Ireland) Alan Campbell	Shamrock Rovers	22
1980–81	Eugene Davis	Athlone Town	23
1981–82	(Republic of Ireland) Michael O'Connor	Athlone Town	22
1982–83	(Republic of Ireland) Noel Larkin	Athlone Town	18
1983–84	(Republic of Ireland) Alan Campbell	Shamrock Rovers	24
1984–85	(Republic of Ireland) Tommy Gaynor	Limerick City	17
	(Republic of Ireland) Michael O'Connor	Athlone Town	17

Notes

- ^Note a includes one goal scored for Waterford
- ^Note b includes two goals scored for Sligo Rovers

== Premier Division ==
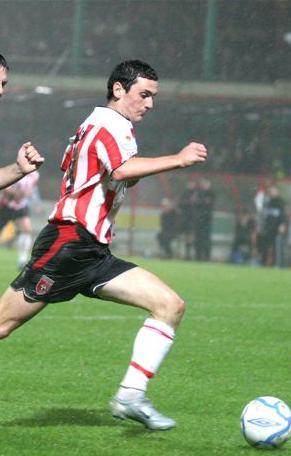
Mark Farren, the Premier Division top scorer in 2008 and the First Division top scorer in 2010

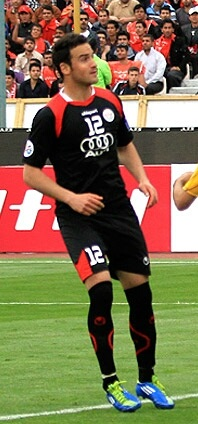
Éamon Zayed, the Premier Division top scorer in 2011

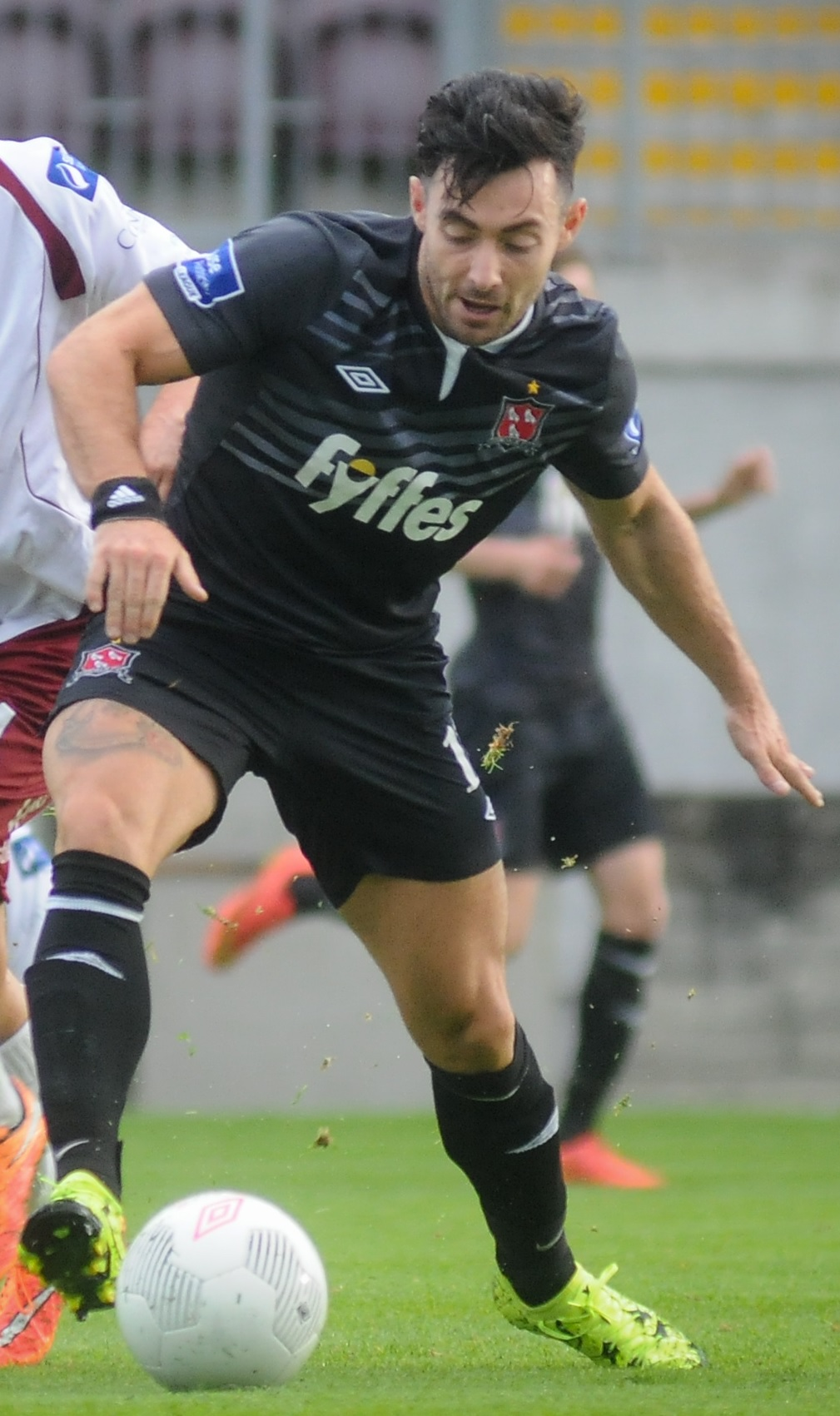
Richie Towell, the Premier Division top scorer in 2015

Season	Player	Club	Goals
1985-86	(Republic of Ireland) Tommy Gaynor	Limerick	15
1986-87	(Republic of Ireland) Mick Byrne	Shamrock Rovers	12
1987-88	(Northern Ireland) Jonathan Speak	Derry City	24
1988-89	(Northern Ireland) Billy Hamilton	Limerick	21
1989-90	(Republic of Ireland) Mark Ennis	St. Patrick's Athletic	19
1990-91	(Republic of Ireland) Peter Hanrahan	Dundalk	18
1991-92	(Republic of Ireland) John Caulfield	Cork City	16
1992-93	(Republic of Ireland) Pat Morley	Cork City	20
1993-94	(Republic of Ireland) Stephen Geoghegan	Shamrock Rovers	23
1994-95	(Republic of Ireland) John Caulfield	Cork City	16
1995-96	(Republic of Ireland) Stephen Geoghegan	Shelbourne	19
1996-97	(Republic of Ireland) Tony Cousins	Shamrock Rovers	16
1996-97	(Republic of Ireland) Stephen Geoghegan	Shelbourne	16
1997-98	(Republic of Ireland) Stephen Geoghegan	Shelbourne	17
1998-99	(Republic of Ireland) Trevor Molloy	St. Patrick's Athletic	15
1999-00	(Republic of Ireland) Pat Morley	Cork City	20
2000-01	(Republic of Ireland) Glen Crowe	Bohemians	25
2001-02	(Republic of Ireland) Glen Crowe	Bohemians	21
2002-03	(Republic of Ireland) Glen Crowe	Bohemians	18
2003	(Republic of Ireland) Jason Byrne	Shelbourne	21
2004	(Republic of Ireland) Jason Byrne	Shelbourne	25
2005	(Republic of Ireland) Jason Byrne	Shelbourne	22
2006	(Republic of Ireland) Jason Byrne	Shelbourne	15
2007	(Republic of Ireland) David Mooney	Longford Town	19
2008	(Republic of Ireland) David Mooney	Longford Town	15
2008	(Republic of Ireland) Mark Farren	Derry City	15
2008	(Republic of Ireland) Mark Quigley	St Patrick's Athletic	15
2009	(Scotland) Gary Twigg	Shamrock Rovers	24
2010	(Scotland) Gary Twigg	Shamrock Rovers	20
2011	(Libya) Éamon Zayed	Derry City	22
2012	(Scotland) Gary Twigg	Shamrock Rovers	22
2013	(Northern Ireland) Rory Patterson	Derry City	18
2014	(Republic of Ireland) Christy Fagan	St Patrick's Athletic	20
2014	(Republic of Ireland) Patrick Hoban	Dundalk	20
2015	(Republic of Ireland) Richie Towell	Dundalk	25
2016	(Republic of Ireland) Sean Maguire	Cork City	18
2017	(Republic of Ireland) Sean Maguire	Cork City	20
2018	(Republic of Ireland) Patrick Hoban	Dundalk	29
2019	(England) Junior Ogedi-Uzokwe	Derry City	14
2020	(Republic of Ireland) Patrick Hoban	Dundalk	10
2021	(Republic of Ireland) Georgie Kelly	Bohemians	21
2022	(Republic of Ireland) Aidan Keena	Sligo Rovers	18
2023	(Republic of Ireland) Jonathan Afolabi	Bohemians	15
2023	(Republic of Ireland) Jack Moylan	Shelbourne	15
2024	(Republic of Ireland) Patrick Hoban	Derry City	14
2024	(Republic of Ireland) Pádraig Amond	Waterford	14
2025	(Republic of Ireland) Pádraig Amond	Waterford	14
2026	(Republic of Ireland) Tommy Lonergan	Waterford	16

== First Division ==
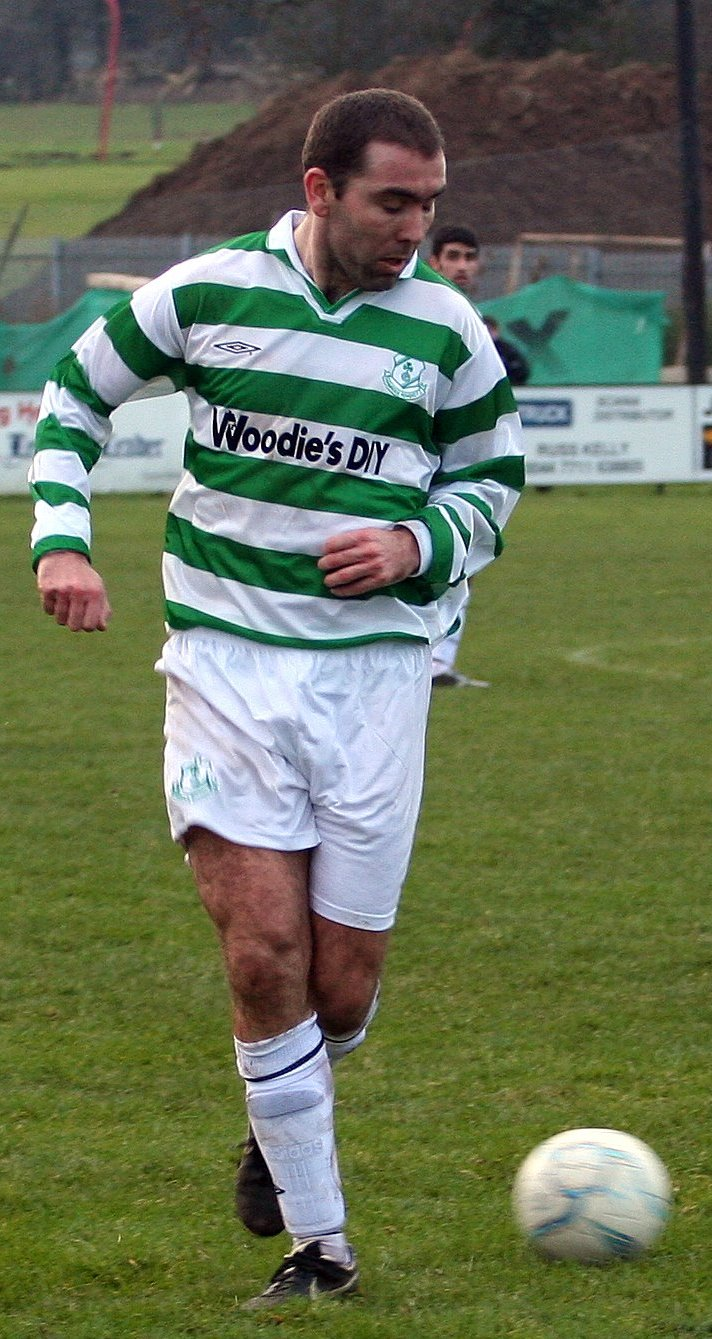
Andrew Myler was the First Division top scorer with two clubs in two successive seasons – Monaghan United in 1999–2000 and Athlone Town in 2000–01.

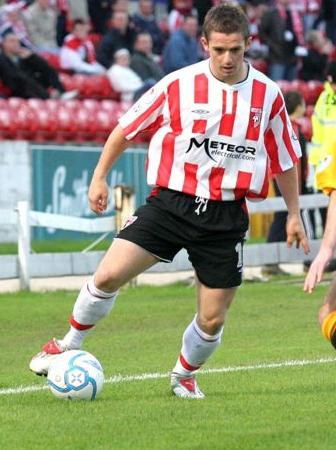
Kevin McHugh was the First Division top scorer for four seasons – 2001–02, 2002–03, 2004 and 2012.

Season	Player	Club	Goals
1985–86	(Republic of Ireland) Con McLoughlin	Finn Harps	11
1985–86	(Republic of Ireland) Harry McLoughlin	Sligo Rovers	11
1986–87	(Socialist Federal Republic of Yugoslavia) Aleksandar Krstić	Derry City	18
1987–88	(Republic of Ireland) Con McLoughlin	Finn Harps	19
1988–89	(Republic of Ireland) Pat O'Connor	Home Farm	14
1989–90	(Republic of Ireland) John Ryan	Bray Wanderers	16
1990–91	(Republic of Ireland) Jim Barr	Monaghan United	12
1990–91	(Republic of Ireland) Con McLoughlin	Finn Harps	12
1991–92	(Republic of Ireland) Con McLoughlin	Finn Harps	12
1991–92	(Republic of Ireland) Barry Ryan	Limerick City	12
1992–93	(Republic of Ireland) Mick Byrne	Monaghan United	15
1992–93	(Republic of Ireland) Richie Parsons	Longford Town	15
1993–94	(Republic of Ireland) Karl Gannon	Home Farm	16
1994–95	(Republic of Ireland) Michael O'Byrne	UCD	14
1994–95	(Republic of Ireland) Philip Power	Home Farm	14
1995–96	(Northern Ireland) Jonathan Speak	Finn Harps	17
1996–97	(Republic of Ireland) Richie Hale	Kilkenny City	13
1996–97	(Republic of Ireland) Tony Izzi	Cobh Ramblers	13
1997–98	(Republic of Ireland) Fergal Coleman	Galway United	13
1998–99	(Republic of Ireland) Tony Izzi	Cobh Ramblers	13
1999–00	(Republic of Ireland) Robbie Farrell	Home Farm Fingal	17
1999–00	(Republic of Ireland) Andrew Myler	Monaghan United	17
1999–00	(Republic of Ireland) Keith O'Connor	Longford Town	17
2000–01	(Republic of Ireland) Andrew Myler	Athlone Town	29 ^{(Note 2)}
2001–02	(Republic of Ireland) Kevin McHugh	Finn Harps	27 ^{(Note 3)}
2002–03	(Republic of Ireland) Willie Bruton	Cobh Ramblers	14
2002–03	(Republic of Ireland) Kevin McHugh	Finn Harps	14
2003	(Republic of Ireland) Alan Murphy	Galway United	21
2004	(Republic of Ireland) Kevin McHugh	Finn Harps	24
2005	(Republic of Ireland) Kieran O'Reilly	Cobh Ramblers	17
2006	(Republic of Ireland) Philip Hughes	Dundalk	21
2007	(Republic of Ireland) Conor Gethins	Finn Harps	15
2008	(Republic of Ireland) Robbie Doyle	Sporting Fingal	17
2009	(Republic of Ireland) Conan Byrne	Sporting Fingal	21
2010	(Republic of Ireland) Graham Cummins	Cork City	18
2010	(Republic of Ireland) Mark Farren	Derry City	18
2010	(Republic of Ireland) Willie John Kiely	Waterford United	18
2011	(Republic of Ireland) Graham Cummins	Cork City	24
2012	(Republic of Ireland) Sean Maguire	Waterford United	13
2012	(Republic of Ireland) Kevin McHugh	Finn Harps	13
2012	(Republic of Ireland) Danny Furlong	Wexford Youths	13 ^{(Note 2)}
2013	(Republic of Ireland) David O'Sullivan	Longford Town	21
2014	(Republic of Ireland) David O'Sullivan	Longford Town	21
2015	(Republic of Ireland) Daniel Furlong	Wexford Youths	30
2016	(Republic of Ireland) Gary O'Neil	UCD	13
2017	(Republic of Ireland) Georgie Kelly	UCD	17
2018	(Republic of Ireland) David O'Sullivan	Shelbourne	15
2019	(Republic of Ireland) Rob Manley	Cabinteely	17
2020	(Republic of Ireland) Yousef Mahdy	UCD	16 ^{(Note 1)}
2021	(Republic of Ireland) Colm Whelan	UCD	21 ^{(Note 3)}
2022	(Scotland) Phoenix Patterson	Waterford	20 ^{(Note 3)}
2023	(Republic of Ireland) Ronan Coughlan	Waterford	36 ^{(Note 3)}
2024	(Republic of Ireland) Dean Ebbe	Athlone Town	17 ^{(Note 2)} (Note: Includes 2 goals scored in the playoffs .)
2025	(Republic of Ireland) Barry Coffey	Cobh Ramblers	26
2026	(Republic of Ireland) Sean Maguire	Cork City	19

Notes

- ^1 Including 1 goal in playoffs
- ^2 Including 2 goals in playoffs
- ^3 Including 3 goals in playoffs

== All–time ==
Key

- **Bold** shows players still playing in the League of Ireland.
- Italics show players still playing professional football in other leagues.

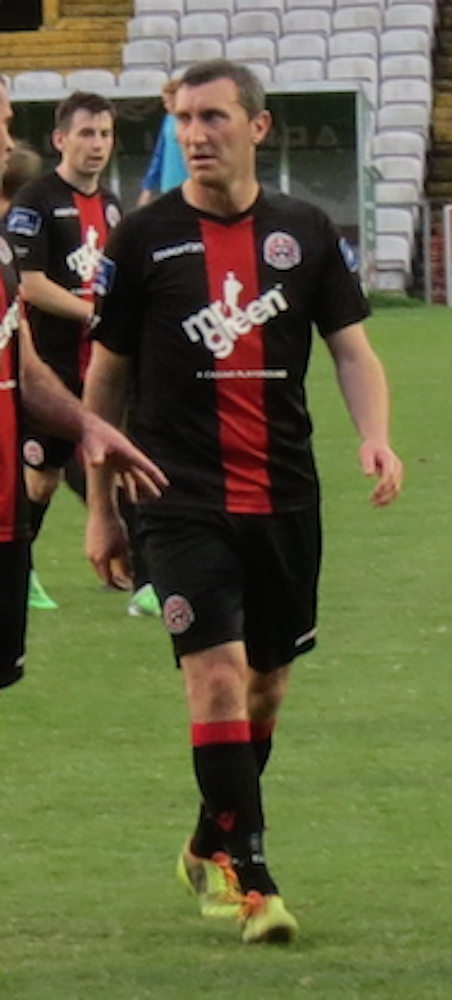
Jason Byrne, the League of Ireland Premier Division top scorer in 2003, 2004, 2005 and 2006 and second in the all–time list

	Player	Goals
1	(Northern Ireland) Brendan Bradley	235
2	(Republic of Ireland) Jason Byrne	222
3	(Republic of Ireland) Pat Morley	182
4	(Republic of Ireland) Turlough O'Connor	178
5	(Republic of Ireland) Kevin McHugh	173
6	(Republic of Ireland) Donal Leahy	162
7	(Republic of Ireland) Glen Crowe	159
8	(Republic of Ireland) Stephen Geoghegan	158
9	(England) Johnny Matthews	156
10	(Republic of Ireland) Pat Hoban	154
11	(Republic of Ireland) Alfie Hale	153
12	(Republic of Ireland) Paul McGee	143
13	(Republic of Ireland) Eric Barber	141
14	(Republic of Ireland) Philip Hughes	138
15	(Republic of Ireland) (Ireland) Sean McCarthy	135
	(Northern Ireland) Jonathan Speak	135
16	(Republic of Ireland) Mick Leech	132
17	(Republic of Ireland) Andrew Myler	131
18	(Republic of Ireland) Eugene Davis (footballer)	130
	(Republic of Ireland) Jack Fitzgerald	130
20	(Republic of Ireland) John Caulfield	129
	Austin Noonan	129
22	(Republic of Ireland) Declan O'Brien	135
23	(Libya) Éamon Zayed	127
24	(Republic of Ireland) Paddy Coad	126
25	(Republic of Ireland) Shay Gibbons	120
26	Paddy O'Leary	118
	(Republic of Ireland) Derek Swan	118
28	(Republic of Ireland) Mick Byrne	117
	(Republic of Ireland) Des Kennedy	117
	(Republic of Ireland) Michael O'Connor	117
31	(Republic of Ireland) David Byrne	115
32	(Republic of Ireland) Dessie Glynn	111
33	(Republic of Ireland) Con McLoughlin	110
34	(Republic of Ireland) Paddy Ambrose	109
	(Republic of Ireland) Ronnie Whelan Snr.	109
36	Barry O'Connor	107
	Trevor Vaughan	107
38	Gary Hulmes	106
39	(Republic of Ireland) Tim O'Keefe	105
40	(Republic of Ireland) Paul Newe	103
	(Republic of Ireland) Danny Furlong	103
	(Republic of Ireland) **Aaron Greene**	103
41	(Republic of Ireland) Terry Eviston	101
42	(Republic of Ireland) Richie Parsons	100
