= 1942 FAI Cup final =

- Event: 1941–42 FAI Cup
Cork United	Dundalk
1	3
- Date: 26 April 1942
- Venue: Dalymount Park, Dublin
- Referee: T. Dwyer
- Attendance: 34,298

The 1942 FAI Cup final was the final match of the 1941–42 FAI Cup, a knock-out association football competition contested annually by clubs affiliated with the Football Association of Ireland. It took place on Sunday 26 April 1942 at Dalymount Park in Dublin, and was contested by Cork United and Dundalk. Dundalk won 3–1 to win their first FAI Cup.

== Background ==
The two sides' three previous meetings that season had seen one win apiece and one draw. Cork United had already won that season's League of Ireland title, and were chasing a second League and Cup Double in a row, having only been founded in 1940. They had defeated Dundalk in the semi-final on the way to winning the FAI Cup the season before. They overcame Cork Bohemians (5–2), St James's Gate (1–0), and Drumcondra (4–2) to reach the 1942 final.

Dundalk had finished fourth in the League, and had just missed out on the League of Ireland Shield, finishing as runners-up. To reach the final, they had defeated non-League Distillery (2–1), Shelbourne (2–1), and Shamrock Rovers (2–1 in a replay following a 2–2 draw). They had lost their three previous appearances in FAI Cup finals.

== Match ==
=== Summary ===
The Cork side put Dundalk under pressure from kick-off, and had numerous chances through winger Jack O'Reilly, while Florrie Bourke hit the crossbar. Cork then had a goal disallowed for offside against Bourke in the 17th minute. It took until early in the second half for Cork to make the breakthrough, O'Reilly scoring in the 53rd minute. The goal brought an immediate response from Dundalk, who equalised through Arthur Kelly inside two minutes. In the 70th minute Kelly scored his second with a shot from the edge of the penalty area and, with Cork fading, Johnny Lavery made it 3–1 to Dundalk with eight minutes remaining to seal Dundalk's first FAI Cup win. The victory ended what many had come to see as a jinx - that Dundalk would never win the cup, given the number of final and semi-final defeats the club had suffered, and an excited pitch invasion delayed the trophy presentation. Five weeks later they were unofficially crowned "Champions of All Ireland", after winning the inaugural Dublin and Belfast Inter-City Cup.

=== Details ===
26 April 1942
15:30

Cork United	1–3	Dundalk
O'Reilly 53'	Report	Kelly 55', 70'; Lavery 82'

Dalymount Park, Dublin
Attendance: 34,298
Referee: T. Dwyer

Cork United	Dundalk

GK	(Republic of Ireland) Jim Foley
RFB	(Republic of Ireland) Bill Hayes
LFB	(Republic of Ireland) Patrick Duffy
RHB	(Republic of Ireland) Johnny McGowan
CHB	(Republic of Ireland) Jerry O'Riordan
LHB	(Republic of Ireland) Richard Noonan
OR	(Republic of Ireland) Jack O'Reilly
IR	(Republic of Ireland) Florrie Burke
CF	(Republic of Ireland) Sean McCarthy
IL	(Republic of Ireland) Liam O'Neill
OL	(Republic of Ireland) Owen Madden

GK	(Northern Ireland) Gerry Matier
RFB	(Republic of Ireland) Billy O'Neill
LFB	(Republic of Ireland) Tom Crawley
RHB	(Republic of Ireland) Joey Donnelly
CHB	(Northern Ireland) Johnny Leatham
LHB	(England) Frank Grice
OR	(Republic of Ireland) Paddy Barlow
IR	(Republic of Ireland) Jim McArdle
CF	(Northern Ireland) Arthur Kelly
IL	(Northern Ireland) Johnny Lavery
OL	(Northern Ireland) Sam McCartney
