= League of Ireland in Cork city =

- Founded: 1921
- Confederation: UEFA
- Divisions: League of Ireland; Premier Division; First Division; U19 Division; U17 Division
- Domestic cup(s): FAI Cup; President's Cup; Munster Senior Cup
- League cup(s): League of Ireland Cup; League of Ireland Shield; Dublin City Cup; Top Four Cup; FAI Super Cup
- Most championships: Cork United (5); Cork City (3); Cork Athletic (2); Cork Celtic (1); Cork Hibernians (1)

Cork is a city in Ireland, located in the South-West Region, in the province of Munster. It is the second largest city in the Republic of Ireland and the third most populous on the island of Ireland. Eight association football clubs/teams or franchises from Cork have represented the city in the League of Ireland. In 1924–25 Fordsons became the first team from the city to join the league. Since then, apart from the two seasons, 1982–83 and 1983–84, the league has featured at least one Cork team. The current representative, Cork City F.C., was elected to the league in 1984–85. Between them, teams from Cork have won the league title on twelve occasions.

== Clubs ==
Club	From/to	Seasons
Fordsons/Cork F.C.	1924–1938	14
Cork Bohemians	1932–1934	2
Cork City I	1938–1940	1½
Cork United I	1940–1948	7½
Cork Athletic	1948–1957	9
Evergreen United/Cork Celtic	1951–1979	28
Cork Hibernians	1957–1976	19
Albert Rovers/Cork Alberts/Cork United II	1976–1982	6
Cork City II	1984-present	43

^1 Where multiple names are listed, the clubs have changed names. See below

== Timeline ==
Year	Event
1924	Fordsons F.C. become first club from Cork to play in League of Ireland. Finish 4th in 1924–25 season
1930	Fordsons changed their name to Cork F.C.
1932	Cork Bohemians F.C. enter league.
1934	Cork win the 1933–34 FAI Cup. Cork Bohemians resigned from league.
1938	Cork are replaced by Cork City
1940	On 13 February Cork City was dissolved and Cork United was immediately formed. United took on the playing record and fixtures of the defunct club.
1941	Cork United win league and FAI cup double. They finished level with Waterford AFC on points and the league decided a play off should be played in Cork. Waterford refused to play in Cork, preferring a neutral ground or a two legged game. The league awarded the championship to Cork United. Cork also beat Waterford in the FAI Cup final after a replay.
1942	Cork United win league for second season in a row
1943	Cork United complete hat-trick of league titles
1945	Cork United win fourth league title
1946	Cork United win 5th league title in six seasons
1947	Cork United win FAI Cup
1948	On 10 October United resigned from the league after competing in the Dublin City Cup and some of the League of Ireland Shield. Cork Athletic was immediately formed with the same personnel and took their place in the league
1950	Cork Athletic win the league
1951	Cork Athletic win the league and FAI Cup double. Evergreen United elected to the league
1953	Cork Athletic win FAI Cup
1957	Cork Athletic resign from league. Cork Hibernians elected to league.
1959	Evergreen United change their name to Cork Celtic
1971	Cork Hibernians win the league championship
1972	Cork Hibernians win FAI Cup. Miah Dennehy scores first ever hat trick in final.
1973	Cork Hibs win FAI Cup for second year in a row
1974	Cork Celtic win league championship
1976	Cork Hibernians resign from league. Albert Rovers elected to league
1977	Albert Rovers change their name to Cork Albert and in October changed again, adding an 's' to become Cork Alberts
1979	Cork Celtic expelled from league. Cork Alberts change their name to Cork United
1982	Cork United expelled from the league
1984	Cork City formed and elected to the league
1985	Cork Hibernians formed and elected to the League of Ireland First Division. Due to cost of insurance at Turners Cross, the club were removed from the League without playing a match
1993	Cork City win league title
1998	Cork City win FAI Cup
2004	Cork City go on an Intertoto Cup run beating a record number of teams, compared to other Irish competitors
2005	Cork City win league title
2007	Cork City win FAI Cup
2008	Cork City win the Setanta Sports Cup
2008	Cork City go into examinership
2009	High Court issues order to wind up Cork City FC, order later removed
2010	Tom Coughlan is banned by the FAI and forced to relinquish control as chairman and enter takeover talks
2010	Cork City Investments Fc Ltd is wound up but the club is saved and competes under the temporary name Cork City FORAS Co-op in the League of Ireland First Division. The underage teams continue to compete under the name Cork City Football Club, now owned and funded by the fans.
2010	Cork City purchased the name and other rights of Cork City Football Club from the former holding company Cork City Investments Fc Ltd., and resume competing under the Cork City name in the 2011 season.
2011	Cork City win the League of Ireland First Division, ensuring promotion to the League of Ireland Premier Division.
2017	Cork City win their first league and cup double
2020	Cork City finish bottom of the 2020 League of Ireland Premier Division table, meaning relegation to the First Division for the 2021 season. While, later in 2020, the FORAS supporters trust votes to sell the club to Preston North End owner Trevor Hemmings, this is not progressed.
2022	Cork City win the 2022 League of Ireland First Division title, providing for a return to the premier division.

== Champions ==
=== List of winners by season ===
==== A Division ====
Season	Champions	Runners-up	Third place
1925–26	Shelbourne	Shamrock Rovers	Fordsons
1931–32	Shamrock Rovers	Cork	Waterford
1933–34	Bohemians	Cork	Shamrock Rovers
1935–36	Bohemians	Dolphin	Cork
1940–41	Cork United	Waterford	Bohemians
1941–42	Cork United	Shamrock Rovers	Shelbourne
1942–43	Cork United	Dundalk	Drumcondra
1944–45	Cork United	Limerick	Shamrock Rovers
1945–46	Cork United	Drumcondra	Waterford
1949–50	Cork Athletic	Drumcondra	Shelbourne
1950–51	Cork Athletic	Sligo Rovers	Drumcondra
1953–54	Shamrock Rovers	Evergreen United	Drumcondra
1957–58	Dumcondra	Shamrock Rovers	Evergreen United
1958–59	Shamrock Rovers	Evergreen United	Waterford
1959–60	Limerick	Cork Celtic	Shelbourne
1961–62	Shelbourne	Cork Celtic	Shamrock Rovers
1967–68	Waterford	Dundalk	Cork Celtic
1968–69	Waterford	Shamrock Rovers	Cork Hibernians
1969–70	Waterford	Shamrock Rovers	Cork Hibernians
1970–71	Cork Hibernians	Shamrock Rovers	Waterford
1971–72	Waterford	Cork Hibernians	Bohemians
1973–74	Cork Celtic	Bohemians	Cork Hibernians

==== Premier Division ====
Season	Champions	Runners-up	Third place
1990–91	Dundalk	Cork City	St Patrick's Athletic
1991–92	Shelbourne	Derry City	Cork City
1992–93	Cork City	Bohemians	Shelbourne
1993–94	Shamrock Rovers	Cork City	Galway United
1997–98	St Patrick's Athletic	Shelbourne	Cork City
1998–99	St Patrick's Athletic	Cork City	Shelbourne
1999–00	Shelbourne	Cork City	Bohemians
2000–01	Bohemians	Shelbourne	Cork City
2003	Shelbourne	Bohemians	Cork City
2004	Shelbourne	Cork City	Bohemians
2005	Cork City	Derry City	Shelbourne
2009	Bohemians	Shamrock Rovers	Cork City
2014	Dundalk	Cork City	St Patrick's Athletic
2015	Dundalk	Cork City	Shamrock Rovers
2016	Dundalk	Cork City	Derry City
2017	Cork City	Dundalk	Shamrock Rovers
2018	Dundalk	Cork City	Shamrock Rovers

=== List of winners by club ===
Club	Titles	Seasons
Cork United	5	1940–41, 1941–42, 1942–43, 1944–45, 1945–46
Cork City	3	1992–93, 2005, 2017
Cork Athletic	2	1949–50, 1950–51
Cork Celtic	1	1973–74
Cork Hibernians	1	1970–71
