= 1947–48 League of Ireland =

League of Ireland
- Season: 1947–48
- Champions: Drumcondra (1st title)
- Matches played: 56
- Goals scored: 194 (3.46 per match)
- Top goalscorer: Seán McCarthy (13 goals)
- Biggest home win: Cork United 6–2 Limerick; Dundalk 4–0 Waterford
- Biggest away win: Bohemians 1-5 Drumcondra
- Highest scoring: Bohemians 3-6 Shelbourne

The 1947–48 League of Ireland was the 27th season of senior football in the Republic of Ireland.

Shelbourne were the defending champions.

== Changes from 1946–47 ==
No new teams were elected to the League.

== Teams ==
Locations of the 1947–48 League of Ireland teams

Team	Location	Stadium
Bohemians	Dublin (Phibsborough)	Dalymount Park
Cork United	Cork	Mardyke
Drumcondra	Dublin (Clonturk)	Clonturk Park
Dundalk	Dundalk	Oriel Park
Limerick	Limerick	Markets Field
Shamrock Rovers	Dublin (Milltown)	Glenmalure Park
Shelbourne	Dublin (Ringsend)	Shelbourne Park
Waterford	Waterford	Kilcohan Park

== Season overview ==
Drumcondra won their first title.

== Table ==
Pos	Team	Pld	W	D	L	GF	GA	GD	Pts
1	Drumcondra	14	7	4	3	29	22	+7	18
2	Dundalk	14	6	5	3	21	14	+7	17
3	Shelbourne	14	7	3	4	30	24	+6	17
4	Shamrock Rovers	14	4	6	4	26	24	+2	14
5	Limerick	14	5	3	6	22	27	−5	13
6	Cork United	14	3	6	5	29	30	−1	12
7	Waterford	14	5	1	8	18	24	−6	11
8	Bohemians	14	4	2	8	19	29	−10	10

Source: RSSSF, foot.dk

== Results ==
Home \ Away	BOH	CUF	DRU	DUN	LIM	SHM	SHE	WAT
Bohemians	—	1–2	1–5	0–2	5–2	0–1	3–6	1–0
Cork United	1–1	—	3–4	0–0	6–2	4–3	1–2	1–2
Drumcondra	0–2	2–2	—	2–0	1–1	3–1	1–4	3–2
Dundalk	3–0	2–2	2–0	—	2–0	1–1	2–2	4–0
Limerick	4–2	3–1	1–1	2–0	—	1–1	2–1	0–2
Shamrock Rovers	0–0	2–2	3–3	4–0	2–1	—	2–2	3–2
Shelbourne	1–2	5–3	0–3	1–1	2–0	2–1	—	2–1
Waterford	2–1	1–1	0–1	0–2	1–3	3–2	2–0	—

Source: Extratime.ie
Legend: Blue = home team win; Yellow = draw; Red = away team win.

== Top goalscorers ==
Rank	Player	Club	Goals
1	(Republic of Ireland) Sean McCarthy	Cork United	13
2	(Republic of Ireland) Kit Lawlor	Drumcondra	10
3	(Republic of Ireland) Brendan Carroll	Shelbourne	9
3	(Republic of Ireland) Paddy Coad	Shamrock Rovers	9
5	(Republic of Ireland) Gerry Malone	Shelbourne	8
5	(Republic of Ireland) Peadar Walsh	Dundalk	8
7	(Republic of Ireland) Benny Henderson	Drumcondra	7
8	(Republic of Ireland) Podge Gregg	Shamrock Rovers	6
8	(Republic of Ireland) Paddy Kinsella	Shelbourne	6
10	(Republic of Ireland) Danny Cameron	Shelbourne	5
10	(Republic of Ireland) Austin Curtin	Waterford	5
10	(Republic of Ireland) Noel Doyle	Bohemians	5
10	(Republic of Ireland) Tony Drummond	Cork United	5
10	(Republic of Ireland) Johnny Gavin	Limerick	5
10	(Republic of Ireland) Paddy O'Leary	Cork United	5

== See also ==
- 1947–48 FAI Cup
