= Ned Courtney =

Irish footballer (died 1997)

Personal information
- Full name: Edward Courtney
- Place of birth: Dublin, Ireland
- Date of death: 25 July 1997
- Position: Goalkeeper

Senior career*
| Years | Team | Apps | (Gls) |
- Kickhams (Gaelic football)
- Cork GAA (Gaelic football)
| 1945–1948 | Cork United | | |
| 1948–195x | Cork Athletic | | |

International career
| 1946 | Ireland | 1 | (0) |
- * Club domestic league appearances and goals

Ned Courtney was an Irish footballer who played Gaelic football for Cork GAA and association football for Cork United, Cork Athletic and Ireland. Courtney, who played as a goalkeeper in both codes, was originally from Dublin and was a captain in the Irish Army. He won a Munster Senior Football Championship with Cork GAA before going onto win three League of Ireland titles. Between 1950–51 and 1952–53 he also played in three successive FAI Cup finals.

== Playing career ==
=== Cork GAA ===
In 1943 Courtney was a member of the Cork GAA team that won the Munster Senior Football Championship. On 6 June 1943, in the semi-final stage, Cork drew 2–3 to 0–9 with Kerry at the Cork Athletic Grounds. On 11 July, in the replay at the same venue, Cork beat Kerry 1–5 to 1–4. In the final played in Fermoy, Cork beat Tipperary 1–7 to 1–4. Courtney also played for Cork in the 1943 All-Ireland Senior Football Championship semi-final at Croke Park against Cavan. However Cork lost 1–8 to 1–7. Among his teammates while playing for Cork GAA were Jack Lynch, Jim Ahern, Tadhgo Crowley, Éamonn Young and Nealie Duggan.

=== Cork United ===
Courtney signed for Cork United in 1945 and in the 1945–46 season he helped them win his first League of Ireland title. His United teammates included, among others, Bill Hayes, Jack O'Reilly, Florrie Burke, Owen Madden, Jackie O'Driscoll, Frank O'Farrell and Tommy Moroney.

=== Cork Athletic ===
While playing for Cork Athletic, Courtney won two more League of Ireland titles in 1949–50 and 1950–51. In 1950–51 he played in the first of three FAI Cup finals. Athletic beat Shelbourne 1–0 after a replay. In 1951–52 Athletic played Dundalk. Courtney played in a 0–0 draw, but missed the replay which Athletic lost 3–0. In 1952–53 they won the first all-Cork FAI Cup final, beating Evergreen United 2–1.

== Representative Honours ==
=== Irish Army ===
In September 1944, the then Corporal Courtney participated in a 42 mile march that was later recognised as a world record for a speed march under peacetime conditions

On 14 April 1946 Courtney played for an Irish Army XI that defeated an FAI XI 2–1. The Army team also included Con Martin, Willie Fallon and Tommy Moroney.

=== Ireland ===
In June 1946 Courtney was included in the Ireland squad selected for an overseas tour featuring games against Portugal and Spain. However, he was only included in the squad after Hugh Kelly withdrew. Courtney had to be driven from Cork to Dublin in an Irish Army lorry in order to join up with the squad in time. He made his one and only appearance for Ireland against Portugal on 16 June 1946 at the Estádio da Luz. It was a less than memorable debut however. After just twenty minutes, Courtney had conceded three goals with Araujo, Rogerio and Peyroteo all scoring. He was also injured trying to save Portugal's third goal and had to be replaced by Con Martin after only thirty minutes. Ireland eventually lost 3–1.

== Honours ==
=== Gaelic football ===
Cork GAA

- Munster Senior Football Championship: 1943

=== Association football ===
Cork United

- League of Ireland: 1945–46

Cork Athletic

- League of Ireland: 1949–50, 1950–51
- FAI Cup: 1950–51, 1952–53; runner-up 1951–52
