= 1946–47 League of Ireland =

League of Ireland
- Season: 1946–47
- Champions: Shelbourne (5th title)
- Matches played: 56
- Goals scored: 228 (4.07 per match)
- Top goalscorer: Paddy Coad; Alf Hanson (11 goals each)
- Biggest home win: Bohemians 6-0 Limerick
- Biggest away win: Bohemians 1–5 Drumcondra
- Highest scoring: Shelbourne 6–2 Dundalk

The 1946–47 League of Ireland was the 26th season of senior football in the Republic of Ireland.

Cork United were the defending champions.

== Changes from 1945–46 ==
No new teams were elected to the League.

== Teams ==
Locations of the 1945–46 League of Ireland teams

Team	Location	Stadium
Bohemians	Dublin (Phibsborough)	Dalymount Park
Cork United	Cork	Mardyke
Drumcondra	Dublin (Clonturk)	Clonturk Park
Dundalk	Dundalk	Oriel Park
Limerick	Limerick	Markets Field
Shamrock Rovers	Dublin (Milltown)	Glenmalure Park
Shelbourne	Dublin (Ringsend)	Shelbourne Park
Waterford	Waterford	Kilcohan Park

== Season overview ==
Shelbourne won their fifth title, their first in three years.

== Table ==
Pos	Team	Pld	W	D	L	GF	GA	GD	Pts
1	Shelbourne	14	8	3	3	34	24	+10	19
2	Drumcondra	14	8	2	4	29	25	+4	18
3	Shamrock Rovers	14	7	3	4	34	21	+13	17
4	Cork United	14	7	2	5	40	27	+13	16
5	Bohemians	14	5	3	6	33	33	0	13
6	Dundalk	14	4	3	7	25	37	−12	11
7	Waterford	14	3	3	8	17	30	−13	9
8	Limerick	14	2	5	7	16	31	−15	9

Source: RSSSF, foot.dk

== Results ==
Home \ Away	BOH	CUF	DRU	DUN	LIM	SHM	SHE	WAT
Bohemians	—	4–1	1–5	3–1	6–0	1–3	4–3	1–2
Cork United	6–1	—	4–1	5–1	2–0	1–1	1–1	4–1
Drumcondra	3–2	3–2	—	4–4	0–2	3–2	2–0	1–0
Dundalk	1–3	2–5	1–0	—	3–0	2–1	1–2	3–0
Limerick	2–2	0–3	4–1	2–2	—	2–2	1–2	1–1
Shamrock Rovers	3–3	4–2	1–2	5–1	3–1	—	1–2	3–0
Shelbourne	1–1	4–2	1–1	6–2	3–0	1–4	—	4–2
Waterford	2–1	4–2	1–3	1–1	1–1	0–1	2–4	—

Source: Extratime.ie
Legend: Blue = home team win; Yellow = draw; Red = away team win.

== Top goalscorers ==
Rank	Player	Club	Goals
1	(Republic of Ireland) Paddy Coad	Shamrock Rovers	11
1	(England) Alf Hanson	Shelbourne	11
3	(Republic of Ireland) Mick O'Flanagan	Bohemians	10
3	(Republic of Ireland) Seán McCarthy	Cork United	10
5	(Republic of Ireland) Podge Gregg	Shamrock Rovers	9
5	(Republic of Ireland) Gerry Malone	Shelbourne	9
7	(Republic of Ireland) Kit Lawlor	Drumcondra	8
8	(Republic of Ireland) Eugene Kirby	Bohemians	7
8	(Republic of Ireland) Owen Madden	Cork United	7
8	(Republic of Ireland) Paddy O'Leary	Cork United	7

== See also ==
- 1946–47 FAI Cup
