= Jackie O'Driscoll =

Irish footballer

Personal information
- Full name: John Francis O'Driscoll
- Date of birth: 20 September 1921
- Place of birth: Cork, Ireland
- Date of death: 11 March 1988 (aged 66)
- Place of death: Swansea, Wales
- Height: 5 ft 8 in (1.73 m)
- Position: Winger

Senior career*
| Years | Team | Apps | (Gls) |
| 1938–1939 | Cork City | | |
| 194x–1942 | Waterford United | | |
| 1942–1943 | Shelbourne | | |
| 1943–1947 | Cork United | | |
| 1947–1952 | Swansea Town | 118 | (24) |
| 1952–1957 | Llanelli | | |

International career
| 1948–1949 | Ireland (IFA) | 3 | (0) |
| 1948–1949 | Ireland (FAI) | 3 | (0) |
- * Club domestic league appearances and goals

John Francis O'Driscoll (20 September 1921 – 11 March 1988) is an Irish former footballer who played as a winger for several teams in the League of Ireland. He also played for Swansea Town. O'Driscoll was a dual international and played for both Ireland teams – the FAI XI and the IFA XI.

== Irish international ==
When O'Driscoll began his international career in 1948 there were, in effect, two Ireland teams, chosen by two rival associations. Both associations, the Northern Ireland-based IFA and the Ireland-based FAI claimed jurisdiction over the whole of Ireland and selected players from the whole island. As a result, several notable Irish players from this era, including O'Driscoll, played for both teams.

=== IFA XI ===
Between 1948 and 1949 O'Driscoll made 3 appearances for the IFA XI. On 9 October 1948 he made his international debut for the IFA XI in a 6–2 defeat against England. On 17 November 1948 he made his second appearance for the IFA XI in a 3–2 defeat against Scotland. He made his last appearance for the IFA XI against Wales on 9 March 1949 in a 2–0 defeat.

=== FAI XI ===
Between 1948 and 1949 O'Driscoll also made 3 appearances for the FAI XI. He won his first cap on 5 December 1948 in a 1–0 defeat in a friendly Switzerland at Dalymount Park. He also played for the FAI XI on 24 April 1949 in another friendly at Dalymount against Belgium. This time the FAI XI lost 2–0. He won his final FAI XI cap on 2 June 1949 a in 3–1 away defeat against Sweden, a qualifier for the 1950 FIFA World Cup.

== Player ==
Waterford

- League of Ireland runner-up: 1940–41
- FAI Cup runner-up: 1941

Cork United

- League of Ireland: 1942–43, 1944–45, 1945–46
- FAI Cup: 1947; runner-up: 1943
- League of Ireland Shield: 1943
- Munster Senior Cup: 1945, 1946, 1947

Swansea Town

- Third Division South: 1948–49

Llanelli

- West Wales Senior Cup: 1952–53
