= 1945–46 League of Ireland =

League of Ireland
- Season: 1945–46
- Champions: Cork United (5th title)
- Matches played: 56
- Goals scored: 258 (4.61 per match)
- Top goalscorer: Patrick O'Leary (15 goals)
- Biggest home win: Cork United 9–1 Drumcondra
- Biggest away win: Bohemians 1–5 Shamrock Rovers; Waterford 1–5 Limerick
- Highest scoring: Cork United 9–1 Drumcondra; Limerick 4–6 Cork United

The 1945–46 League of Ireland was the 25th season of senior football in the Republic of Ireland.

Cork United were the defending champions.

== Changes from 1944–45 ==
Brideville failed to get re-elected and were replaced by Waterford, who returned after a five-year absence.

== Teams ==
Locations of the 1945–46 League of Ireland teams

Team	Location	Stadium
Bohemians	Dublin (Phibsborough)	Dalymount Park
Cork United	Cork	Mardyke
Drumcondra	Dublin (Clonturk)	Clonturk Park
Dundalk	Dundalk	Oriel Park
Limerick	Limerick	Markets Field
Shamrock Rovers	Dublin (Milltown)	Glenmalure Park
Shelbourne	Dublin (Ringsend)	Shelbourne Park
Waterford	Waterford	Kilcohan Park

== Season overview ==
Cork United successfully defended their title, winning their fifth title in six years.

== Table ==
Pos	Team	Pld	W	D	L	GF	GA	GD	Pts
1	Cork United	14	9	3	2	46	20	+26	21
2	Drumcondra	14	8	3	3	37	34	+3	19
3	Waterford	14	7	2	5	29	28	+1	16
4	Shamrock Rovers	14	6	2	6	40	31	+9	14
5	Dundalk	14	4	5	5	36	37	−1	13
6	Limerick	14	5	1	8	25	28	−3	11
7	Bohemians	14	4	2	8	19	36	−17	10
8	Shelbourne	14	3	2	9	26	44	−18	8

Source: RSSSF, foot.dk

== Results ==
Home \ Away	BOH	CUF	DRU	DUN	LIM	SHM	SHE	WAT
Bohemians	—	1–1	0–2	1–4	2–1	1–5	3–1	0–1
Cork United	3–1	—	9–1	6–2	2–1	2–1	6–0	0–1
Drumcondra	2–3	1–1	—	5–3	3–1	2–2	4–1	3–1
Dundalk	3–1	2–2	1–2	—	2–2	5–3	2–2	3–3
Limerick	0–1	4–6	1–2	2–1	—	2–0	4–1	2–0
Shamrock Rovers	7–2	2–4	2–5	3–3	2–0	—	6–0	4–1
Shelbourne	4–1	0–3	3–3	2–4	5–0	1–2	—	3–1
Waterford	2–2	3–1	4–2	3–1	1–5	3–1	5–1	—

Source: Extratime.ie
Legend: Blue = home team win; Yellow = draw; Red = away team win.

== Top goalscorers ==
Rank	Player	Club	Goals
1	(Republic of Ireland) Patrick O'Leary	Cork United	15
2	(Republic of Ireland) Mick O'Flanagan	Bohemians	11
2	(Republic of Ireland) Tommy McCormack	Drumcondra	11
2	(Republic of Ireland) Tommy Eglington	Shamrock Rovers	11
5	(Republic of Ireland) George Sterling	Dundalk	10
6	(Republic of Ireland) Benny Henderson	Drumcondra	8
6	(Republic of Ireland) Paddy Coad	Shamrock Rovers	8
6	(Republic of Ireland) Chris Curtin	Waterford	8
9	(Republic of Ireland) Connie Forde	Cork United	7
9	(Republic of Ireland) Seán McCarthy	Cork United	7
9	(Republic of Ireland) Jackie O'Driscoll	Cork United	7
9	(Republic of Ireland) Willie Fallon	Dundalk	7
9	(Republic of Ireland) Tommy Byrne	Limerick	7
9	(England) Davy Cochrane	Shamrock Rovers	7
9	(Republic of Ireland) Gerry Malone	Shelbourne	7
9	(Republic of Ireland) Leo Ward	Drumcondra	7

== See also ==
- 1945–46 FAI Cup
