= McAlinden =

McAlinden is a surname. Notable people with the surname include:

- Bobby McAlinden (born 1946), English footballer
- Danny McAlinden (1947–2021), Northern Ireland boxer
- Edith McAlinden (born 1968), Scottish murderer
- Jimmy McAlinden (1917–1993), footballer
- Kevin McAlinden (1913–1978), Northern Ireland footballer
- Liam McAlinden (born 1993), English-Irish footballer

== Place ==
- McAlinden, Western Australia, a locality in Western Australia
