= 1943–44 League of Ireland =

League of Ireland
- Season: 1943–44
- Champions: Shelbourne (4th title)
- Matches played: 56
- Goals scored: 222 (3.96 per match)
- Top goalscorer: Seán McCarthy (16 goals)
- Biggest home win: Shamrock Rovers 7–0 St James's Gate
- Biggest away win: St James's Gate 0–7 Cork United
- Highest scoring: Cork United 6–3 Drumcondra

The 1943–44 League of Ireland was the 23rd season of senior football in the Republic of Ireland. Cork United were the two-time defending champions.

== Changes from 1942–43 ==
Two teams failed to be re-elected: Bray Unknowns and Brideville, resulting in a reduction in size from ten to eight.

No new teams were elected in their place.

== Teams ==
Locations of the 1943–44 League of Ireland teams

Team	Location	Stadium
Bohemians	Dublin (Phibsborough)	Dalymount Park
Cork United	Cork	Mardyke
Drumcondra	Dublin (Clonturk)	Clonturk Park
Dundalk	Dundalk	Oriel Park
Limerick	Limerick	Markets Field
Shamrock Rovers	Dublin (Milltown)	Glenmalure Park
Shelbourne	Dublin (Ringsend)	Shelbourne Park
St. James's Gate	Dublin (Drimnagh)	Iveagh Grounds

== Season overview ==
Shelbourne won their fourth title.

== Standings ==
Pos	Team	Pld	W	D	L	GF	GA	GD	Pts
1	Shelbourne	14	9	3	2	32	22	+10	21
2	Limerick	14	8	4	2	34	19	+15	20
3	Shamrock Rovers	14	5	5	4	38	27	+11	15
4	Dundalk	14	6	3	5	21	19	+2	15
5	Cork United	14	6	2	6	36	28	+8	14
6	Drumcondra	14	6	2	6	24	28	−4	14
7	Bohemians	14	4	2	8	25	32	−7	10
8	St James's Gate	14	1	1	12	12	47	−35	3

Source: RSSSF, Foot.dk

== Results ==
Home \ Away	BOH	CUF	DRU	DUN	LIM	SHM	SHE	STG
Bohemians	—	3–1	2–2	0–1	2–1	3–2	1–3	3–1
Cork United	2–1	—	6–3	0–0	2–0	1–3	3–2	5–1
Drumcondra	3–2	3–2	—	3–0	0–2	0–4	1–2	2–0
Dundalk	5–2	3–2	2–0	—	2–4	1–1	0–3	3–0
Limerick	2–0	3–0	2–2	3–0	—	3–2	3–3	4–0
Shamrock Rovers	4–3	2–2	1–2	0–0	4–4	—	3–1	7–0
Shelbourne	2–2	4–3	2–1	1–0	0–0	5–3	—	3–2
St James's Gate	3–1	0–7	1–2	0–4	2–3	2–2	0–1	—

Source: Extratime.ie
Legend: Blue = home team win; Yellow = draw; Red = away team win.

== Top goalscorers ==
Pos	Player	Club	Goals
1	(Republic of Ireland) (Ireland) Seán McCarthy	Cork United	16

== See also ==
- 1943–44 FAI Cup
