= 1936 Cork Intermediate Hurling Championship =

Irish hurling competition

- Champions: St Anne's (1st title)
- Runners-up: Lough Rovers

The 1936 Cork Intermediate Hurling Championship was the 27th staging of the Cork Intermediate Hurling Championship since its establishment by the Cork County Board in 1909.

The final was played on 20 September 1936 at the Mardyke in Cork, between St Anne's and Lough Rovers, in what was their first ever meeting in the final. St Anne's won the match by 2–07 to 0–03 to claim their first ever championship title.

== Results ==
=== Final ===
20 September 1936 Final	St Anne's	2-07 – 0-03	Lough Rovers	The Mardyke
