= Mark Farren =

Irish association footballer

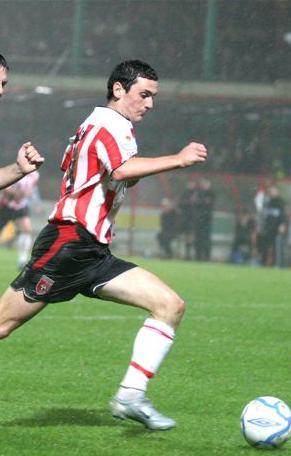
- Farren embarking on a mazy run.

Personal information
- Date of birth: 1 May 1982
- Place of birth: Donegal, Ireland
- Date of death: 3 February 2016 (aged 33)
- Place of death: Moville, Ireland
- Position: Forward

Youth career
- 1998–1999: Tranmere Rovers
- 1999–2000: Huddersfield Town

Senior career*
Years	Team	Apps	(Gls)
2000–2001	Finn Harps	1	(0)
2001–2003	Monaghan United	7	(1)
2003–2012	Derry City	209	(114)
2013–2014	Glenavon	15	(10)
Total		232	(125)
- * Club domestic league appearances and goals

Mark Farren (1 May 1982 – 3 February 2016) was an Irish footballer who played as a forward for Derry City in his prime.

== Career ==
Farren began his football career with a largely unsuccessful period, throughout which he was dogged by injury, in the youth setup at Tranmere Rovers. Following this and a spell at Huddersfield Town, he returned to his home county to play for Finn Harps. After only one substitute League appearance in the 2000–01 League of Ireland season and a lack of first-team opportunities Farren moved south to fellow League of Ireland First Division side Monaghan United. He became a regular in the Monaghan team and quickly gained a reputation as a promising, pacy striker with much potential. He earned a move to Derry City in 2003 with a free transfer.

Farren stayed clear of injury in the 2005 season to produce some magnificent displays. He finished the season as second top scorer with 18 league goals in 31 appearances and 22 goals in all competitions. It was this excellent form that saw him named PFAI Player of the Year. With the signing of Kevin McHugh and the establishment of Gary Beckett as a top forward in League of Ireland football, Farren's starting place was placed under threat for the 2006 season. However, he returned to the form he showed in 2005 and did manage to hold down a regular spot in the team, with an especially strong finish to the season, which helped Derry win the FAI Cup. His efforts also helped keep Derry in the league title race up until the very last day of the season, only to see his club lose the title to Dublin rivals, Shelbourne, on goal difference. In all, Farren finished the 2006 season with 18 goals to his name.

In 2010 Farren was instrumental in Derry gaining promotion from the First Division scoring 20 goals in the season. Farren, who scored in the 1–0 victory in the last game over Monagahan United to give Derry the championship, may however be forced to put his playing career on hold due to a brain tumour.

Twenty goals (in the season) and he's had to deal with so much going through his mind about his future health, never mind his footballing career. He's been unbelievably courageous, I don't think people realise how brave he's been, although certainly all the players do.

— Derry City manager Stephen Kenny.

He was named in the squad travelling to Sligo to play in a crucial league match at the start of September 2011.

Commenting on Farren attempting to surpass Liam Coyle's goal tally, Kenny stated:

It's a challenge for him once he's back playing. Liam is recognised as one of the all-time greats at Derry City and while Mark played with him for a short spell, I think they have great respect for each other and I've no doubt that Liam will be willing Mark to score the six goals he needs to beat the record of 112.

— Derry City manager Stephen Kenny

In August 2012, it was announced that he would be moving to Glenavon in January 2013 after signing a pre-contract agreement. In September 2012 he overtook Liam Coyle as Derry's top scorer with 113 goals. He made his IFA Premiership debut for Glenavon on 5 January 2013 and scored his first goal at Dungannon Swifts.

Farren died of cancer on 3 February 2016. In his honour, Derry City retired the number 18 jersey, which he wore during his time at the club.

== Honours ==
=== Club ===
- FAI Cup (2): 2006 and 2012.
- League of Ireland Cup (5): 2005, 2006, 2007, 2008 and 2011.
- League of Ireland First Division (1): 2010.

=== Individual ===
- League of Ireland Premier Division Top Scorer (1): 2008 (16 goals).
- League of Ireland First Division Top Scorer (1): 2010 (18 goals).
