= Alf Hanson =

English footballer (1912-1993)

Personal information
- Date of birth: 27 July 1912
- Place of birth: Bootle, England
- Date of death: October 1993 (aged 81)
- Place of death: St Helens, Lancashire, England
- Position: Outside left

Youth career
- Bootle JOC League: Bedford Amateurs

Senior career*
| Years | Team | Apps | (Gls) |
| 1929–1930 | Everton | | |
| 1930–1931 | Runcorn | | |
| 1931–1938 | Liverpool | 166 | (50) |
| 1938–1939 | Chelsea | 45 | (9) |
| 1941–1942 | Gloucester City | 18 | (14) |
| 1946–1947 | Shelbourne | 13 | (11) |
| 1947–1948 | South Liverpool | | |
| 1949–1950 | Ellesmere Port Town | | |
| 1950–1952 | Penmaenmawr | | |
| 1952–1953 | Portmadoc | | |
| 1953–1954 | Llanwrst Town | | |

Managerial career
- 1946–1947: Shelbourne
- 1947–1948: South Liverpool
- 1949–1950: Ellesmere Port Town
- * Club domestic league appearances and goals

Adolph Jonathan "Alf" Hanson (27 July 1912 – October 1993) was a football player for Liverpool, Chelsea, South Liverpool, Shelbourne, Ellesmere Port Town and Tranmere Rovers.

== Life and playing career ==
Born Bootle, Lancashire, Hanson played for Bootle JOC League side - Bedford Amateurs before he signed for Everton playing in the Youth sides and A side before moving to Cheshire League side Runcorn before signing for George Patterson's Liverpool in November 1931, he did not make his debut until 21 January 1933 in a 1st Division match at Villa Park. Liverpool lost the match 5–2. Hanson scored his first goal 11 days later in his second appearance in a red shirt on 1 February 1933 in a league game at Anfield. Middlesbrough were the visitors and won the match 3–1. Later that season Hanson scored a hat-trick in a 7–4 derby win against rivals Everton.

Hanson, a ship's plumber by trade, eventually ended up with 52 goals in 177 appearances for Liverpool. Although he had an eye for goal his main talent was the ability to send over pinpoint crosses for one of Liverpool's centre forwards Gordon Hodgson.

Alf Hanson's brother Stan was the goalkeeper for Bolton Wanderers when the two sides met at Anfield on 23 April 1938, the two brothers were made their teams respective captains with Alf coming out on top in a 2–1 victory for Liverpool with goals in the fourth and seventh minutes from Jack Balmer and Phil Taylor respectively.

A columnist from the Liverpool Echo newspaper once wrote of Hanson "A slip of a lad he was not entirely a one-footed player but it was that left boot which put fear into the hearts of goalkeepers when they saw Alf prancing down the wing."

Hanson left Liverpool in the summer of 1938 for the sum of £7,500 although he did 'guest' for Liverpool again in a wartime match. Other clubs he guested for during World War II included Wrexham, Chester, Manchester City, Bolton Wanderers, Crewe Alexandra, Rochdale, Tranmere Rovers and Southport. Hanson eventually entered into management taking on the role of player/manager for South Liverpool, Shelbourne and Ellesmere Port Town before moving across the welsh Border and playing for Penmaenmawr, Portmadoc and Llanwrst before he took up scouting for Wolverhampton Wanderers in North Wales.

His one season at Shelbourne he finished as joint top scorer in the League of Ireland.

Hanson's only England appearance came in a wartime international on 8 February 1941 against Scotland whilst he was contracted to Chelsea. The game was at St James' Park and ended in a 3–2 win to Scotland.

Alf Played both English Baseball and American Rules Baseball especially on Merseyside where he played alongside his Brothers Stan, Herbert (Bert) and Fred Hanson, he also played for an umber of other sides on Merseyside including becoming a winning Captain of Everton baseball side which was formed by the club in the second world war years.

Hanson did, however, play regularly for the England baseball team. Alf joined a small club of dual internationalists in both Association Football and Baseball.

Alf Hanson died in 1993 aged 81.

== Honours ==
Individual

- League of Ireland Top Scorer: 1946–47

== Career details ==
- Liverpool F.C (1931–1938) – 177 appearances, 50 goals
- Chelsea F.C (1938–1946) – 45 appearances, 9 goals
- Shelbourne F.C. (1946–1947) – 13 appearances, 11 goals
- England (1941) 1 wartime cap
