= Cork City F.C. (1938–1940) =

Defunct Irish football club

- Full name: Cork City Football Club
- Founded: 1938; 88 years ago
- Dissolved: 13 February 1940
- Ground: The Mardyke
- League: League of Ireland

Cork City Football Club was an Irish association football club based in Cork. After replacing Cork F.C., they played in the League of Ireland between 1938 and 1940. The club folded in 1940 and were in turn replaced in the League of Ireland by a new club, Cork United.

== History ==
=== Foundation ===
Shortly after Cork F.C. folded, an emergency meeting was held to form a new club. Two potential names were proposed – Cork Celtic and Cork City. During the 1920s both of these names had been used by teams playing in the Munster Senior League. A team named Cork City also finished as Munster Senior Cup runners up in 1924–25. Initially, however, the Cork F.C. name was retained as the new club were given permission to complete Cork F.C.'s fixtures from the 1937–38 League of Ireland season. They eventually finished second last in the league. New colours were also adopted – a strange combination of red, yellow and black hooped shirts.

=== 1938–39 ===
By 1938–39 the new club had settled on Cork City F.C. as their name and began to recruit former internationals that had played for Cork F.C. including goalkeeper Jim Foley, defender Hugh Connolly and wing forward Owen Madden, as well as an existing Irish international in centre forward Tom Davis. The club reached the final of the Dublin City Cup after they defeated Shamrock Rovers 7–0 in the semi-final on 31 August 1938, a result which was Rovers' biggest ever defeat. However, Cork City lost 6–0 in the final to St James's Gate. The club did win the delayed 1938–39 Munster Senior Cup final, defeating Limerick 4–0 at the Mardyke.

=== 1939–40 ===
For the 1939–40 season, Cork City signed Scotsman Willie Ross and former Cork F.C. striker Jimmy Turnbull. The Englishman had scored a record 37 goals from 22 games for Cork in the 1935–36 season and also scored 11 goals in their FAI Cup run to the final. Turnbull had moved to Belfast Celtic afterwards, where he continued his scoring form, and his return down south to Cork was seen as a major coup for the club. The club also managed to recruit another former Cork F.C. player, Billy Millar, as well as two emerging players, Jackie O'Driscoll and Billy O'Neill. However it later emerged that Billy Millar had signed for Cork City while he was still technically contracted to Shelbourne and the club were subsequently fined by the Football Association of Ireland. Like Cork F.C. a few seasons earlier, Cork City began to struggle to raise travel costs for away games in Dublin and the fine received over Millar did not help. On 26 December 1939, the club won the 1938–39 Munster Senior Cup, defeating Limerick 4–0. The final, held over from the previous season, took place at the Mardyke on St Stephen's Day, with Turnbull scoring a hat-trick in the game.

Then on 21 January, Cork City played Shelbourne and were unable to pay the visitors their 20 per cent share of the gate money. On Sunday, 28 January 1940, Cork City played what transpired to be their last match in the club's short history. City defeated Bohemians 2–1 at the Mardyke with O'Neill scoring both goals. At the end of the month, the news broke that the club was to be fined for failing to pay Shelbourne their entitled share. Under threat of suspension from the league, Cork City were given until 2 February 1940 to pay both the gate money and the fine but the club refused to do so, instead offering to defer the Shelbourne payment. The League and the FAI retained their hard-line positions and Cork City were expelled from both the league and all competitions under the FAI's jurisdiction, with the club later dissolved on 13 February 1940.

However history repeated itself and a new club, Cork United, was formed by supporters on 6 February 1940 and given permission to complete Cork City's league fixtures. From the remaining ten games, Cork United accumulated 12 points to give them a fifth-place finish.

== Notable former players ==
=== Dual Ireland internationals ===
- (Ireland) (Republic of Ireland) Tom Davis
- (Ireland) (Republic of Ireland) Owen Madden
- (Ireland) (Republic of Ireland) Jackie O'Driscoll

=== Ireland (FAI) internationals ===
- (Republic of Ireland) Hugh Connolly
- (Republic of Ireland) Jim Foley

=== Ireland (IFA) internationals ===
- (Ireland) Billy Millar

=== Goalscorers ===
- (Republic of Ireland) Billy O'Neill (8) – 1938–39
- (England) Jimmy Turnbull (8) – 1938–39; scored hat-trick in Munster Senior Cup final.

== Honours ==
- Munster Senior Cup
  - Winners: 1938–39
- Dublin City Cup
  - Runners-up: 1938–39

== See also ==
- Cork F.C.
- Cork United F.C. (1940–1948)
- Cork Athletic F.C.
- League of Ireland in Cork city
