= Jim Foley (footballer) =

Irish footballer (1914–1952)

Personal information
- Full name: John James Foley
- Date of birth: 19 March 1914
- Place of birth: Cork, Ireland
- Date of death: 14 October 1952 (aged 38)
- Position: Goalkeeper

Senior career*
Years	Team	Apps	(Gls)
- Cork
1934–1936	Celtic	6	(0)
1936–1938	Plymouth Argyle	41	(0)
1938–1940	Cork City		
1940-1947	Cork United		

International career
1934–1936	Irish Free State	7	(0)
- * Club domestic league appearances and goals

Jim Foley (19 March 1914 – 14 October 1952) was an Irish footballer.

Foley was park of the Cork team that defeated St James's Gate FC in the 1934 FAI Cup final. He subsequently joined Celtic that summer however in his two seasons with Celtic he only made six first team appearances and was mostly the understudy to Joe Kennaway. He signed for Plymouth Argyle in December 1936.

Foley was capped seven times for the Irish Free State at senior level, between 1934 and 1936. He made his debut in a 4–4 draw with Belgium on 25 February 1934. Foley was sometimes known as "Fox" Foley due to his red hair.

== Honours ==
- FAI Cup: 3
  - Cork - 1934
  - Cork United - 1940–41, 1946–47
