= Liam O'Neill (footballer) =

Irish footballer (1919–??)

Personal information
- Full name: William Anthony O'Neill
- Date of birth: 29 December 1919
- Place of birth: Cork, Ireland
- Date of death: unknown
- Position: Inside forward

Senior career*
| Years | Team | Apps | (Gls) |
- Glasheen
- Cork City
- Cork United
| 1942–1948 | Belfast Celtic | | |
| 1948–1949 | Chelmsford City | | |
| 1949–1951 | Burnley | 1 | (1) |
| 1951–1952 | Walsall | 51 | (16) |
- Evergreen United

Managerial career
- Cork Celtic
- * Club domestic league appearances and goals

William Anthony O'Neill (born 29 December 1919, date of death unknown) was an Irish professional footballer who played as a midfielder.

== Club career ==
O'Neill began his career in his native Cork, starting at Glasheen before playing for Cork City and Cork United. In 1942, O'Neill embarked on a move up north to play for Belfast Celtic. O'Neill spent six season at Belfast Celtic playing in the Irish League. During his time at Belfast Celtic, O'Neill scored 38 goals in the 1944–45 season as he finished the season as top scorer.

In 1948, O'Neill moved to England, signing for Southern League side Chelmsford City. During his first season in England, O'Neill made 39 appearances in all competitions, scoring 22 times as the Clarets finished runners up to Gillingham. O'Neill's form at Chelmsford earned him a move to First Division outfit Burnley. Whilst at Burnley, O'Neill primarily played for the club's reserve side in the Central League, as injuries plagued his time at Burnley. On 2 December 1950, O'Neill made his only first team appearance for Burnley, scoring in a 4–1 defeat away to Fulham. In January 1951, O'Neill signed for Walsall. During his time at Walsall, O'Neill scored 16 league goals in 51 games, before returning to Ireland, signing for Evergreen United in December 1952.

== Managerial career ==
During the 1961–62 League of Ireland season, O'Neill returned to former club Cork Celtic as manager, with whom he formerly played for under the guise of Evergreen United.

== Personal life ==
In 1950, O'Neill married Rita McFerran, who played camogie for Antrim GAA, at Corpus Christi Church, Whitehall, Dublin.

== Sources ==
- Joyce, Michael (2004). Football League Players' Records 1888-1939. ISBN 978-1-899468-67-6.
