= Hugh Connolly (footballer) =

Northern Ireland footballer

Personal information
- Full name: Hugh Francis Connolly
- Date of birth: 16 December 1907
- Place of birth: Derry, Ireland
- Position: Defender

Senior career*
Years	Team	Apps	(Gls)
- Cork
1938–193x	Cork City		

International career
1936	Ireland (FAI)	1	(0)
- * Club domestic league appearances and goals

Hugh Connolly was an Irish footballer who played for Cork and Ireland during the 1930s.

== Ireland international ==
When Connolly played international football in 1936 there were, in effect, two Ireland teams, chosen by two rival associations. Both associations, the Northern Ireland - based IFA and the Irish Free State - based FAI claimed jurisdiction over the whole of Ireland and selected players from the whole island. Connolly was one of several players born in Northern Ireland who benefited from the FAI's attempts to establish an all-Ireland influence.

Connolly made his one and only appearance for the FAI XI on 17 October 1936 in a 5-2 win against Germany at Dalymount Park. Together with Bill Gorman, Plev Ellis, Tom Davis and Paddy Moore, Connolly was part of a team coached by Bill Lacey.
