= Kevin O'Flanagan =

Irish sportsman and Olympic official (1919–2006)

Personal information
- Full name: Kevin Patrick O'Flanagan
- Date of birth: 10 June 1919
- Place of birth: Dublin, Ireland
- Date of death: 26 May 2006 (aged 86)
- Place of death: Dublin, Republic of Ireland
- Position: Inside left

Senior career*
Years	Team	Apps	(Gls)
- Gaelic football
193x–193x	Dublin county team		
- Soccer
193x–1936	Home Farm		
1936–1945	Bohemians	145	(95)
1945–1947	Arsenal	14	(3)
1947–1948	Corinthian-Casuals	52	(50)
1948	Barnet		
1949–1950	Brentford	6	(0)
- Rugby union
193x–194x	UCD		
194x–194x	Lansdowne		
194x–194x	London Irish		
194x–194x	→ Leinster		

International career
- Soccer
1937–1947	Ireland (FAI)	10	(3)
1939	League of Ireland XI	2	(0)
1946	Ireland (IFA)	2	(0)
1949–1950	→ (amateur)	2	(0)
- Rugby union
- Irish Universities XV
1942–1947	Ireland	3	(0)
- * Club domestic league appearances and goals

Kevin Patrick O'Flanagan (10 June 1919 – 26 May 2006) was an Irish sportsman, physician and sports administrator. An outstanding all-rounder, he represented his country at both soccer and rugby union. He was also a noted sprinter and long jumper and as a youth played Gaelic football. In his spare time he also played golf and tennis at a decent level. O'Flanagan played soccer for among others, Bohemians and Arsenal, and as an international he played for both Ireland teams – the FAI XI and the IFA XI. O'Flanagan also played rugby union for UCD, London Irish and Ireland.

In 1946 he played rugby for Ireland against France and then played soccer for the IFA XI against Scotland seven days later. His brother, Mick O'Flanagan, was also a notable sportsman and also represented Ireland at both soccer and rugby union. On 30 September 1946 both brothers played together for the FAI XI against England. A third brother, Charlie O'Flanagan, also played for Bohs.

O'Flanagan subsequently became an Olympic official and served on the International Olympic Committee from 1976 to 1994. On his retirement he was made an honorary lifetime member of IOC. He died in a Dublin hospital in 2006, at the age of 86, after being admitted for heart problems.

== Sporting career ==
=== Early years ===
O'Flanagan attended Synge Street CBS, Dublin where the main sport was Gaelic football and he was subsequently included on the minor Dublin county panel. The panel also included Johnny Carey and together they also played soccer with Home Farm. When the Gaelic Athletic Association found out, O'Flanagan, but not Carey was dropped from the panel. He continued to play soccer and joined Bohemians, making his first team debut at 16. In the summer of 1937 he played for an Ireland junior team against a Birmingham FA XI at West Bromwich and scored twice in a 4–3 win. His performance resulted in offers from Liverpool, Aston Villa and Manchester United, but his parents insisted that he complete his education.

=== University years ===
In 1937 O'Flanagan began studying medicine at University College Dublin and it was while there that he developed into an all-round sportsman. He continued to play soccer for Bohemians and on 7 November 1937, aged 18, he scored on his senior debut for Ireland against Norway, in a qualifier for the 1938 FIFA World Cup. In 1945 he also captained Bohs as they won the Dublin and Belfast Intercity Cup, beating Belfast Celtic 3–2 on aggregate in the final.

It was while at UCD that O'Flanagan first took up rugby union, playing for the university team, and in 1942 he received his first call up to the Ireland squad. O'Flanagan also emerged as a prominent athlete and was Irish long jump champion in 1939 and the 60 yards and 100 yards champion in 1941. In 1941 he tied with David Guiney for the long jump title, but with only one gold medal available, he insisted his rival accept it as he already had one. Only the Second World War prevented O'Flanagan representing Ireland at a third sport.

=== London years ===
After qualifying as a doctor from UCD in 1945, O'Flanagan was offered a position as a junior GP in Ruislip, Middlesex. He maintained his interest in sport, however, playing soccer for Arsenal and rugby union for London Irish. Despite being good enough to play soccer as a professional, he remained an amateur so he could continue to play rugby union. In his debut season with Arsenal, 1945–46, he scored 11 goals in 18 Football League South appearances, finishing as the club's top scorer; he also played a further two games for Arsenal in the FA Cup in a two-legged tie against West Ham United that Arsenal lost 6–1 on aggregate.

During the 1946–47 season he made 14 First Division appearances and scored 3 goals. He made his first-class league debut against Blackburn Rovers on 4 September 1946. His last appearance for the Arsenal senior team came on 28 December 1946 against Wolves. He continued to play for Arsenal Reserves until 1948 and later played for both Barnet and Brentford before his increasing medical commitments and an ankle injury, forced him to retire as a sportsman in 1949. However O'Flanagan, who was now a specialist in sports medicine, had already embarked on his next career. A chance encounter with FA chairman Stanley Rous led to his appointment to the British Olympic Medical Commission and to him becoming team doctor for Great Britain at the 1948 Summer Olympics.

== Irish international ==
=== Soccer international ===
When O'Flanagan began his international soccer career in 1937 there were, in effect, two Ireland teams, chosen by two rival associations. Both associations, the Northern Ireland – based IFA and the Irish Free State – based FAI claimed jurisdiction over the whole of Ireland and selected players from the whole island. As a result, several notable Irish players from this era, including O'Flanagan, played for both teams.

Between 1937 and 1947 O'Flanagan made 10 appearances and scored 3 goals for the FAI XI. He won 7 of these caps while playing for Bohemians and made his international debut against Norway on 7 November 1937, in a qualifier for the 1938 FIFA World Cup. O'Flanagan scored in the 3–3 draw. His teammates on the day included fellow debutant, Johnny Carey and Jimmy Dunne. The highlight of his international career came when he scored twice in a 2–2 away draw against Hungary on 18 May 1939. With Hungary 1–0 up at half-time, O'Flanagan turned the game around with two magnificent goals in the 52nd and 77th minutes. He scored the first with his left foot from twenty five yards and the second with his right foot from a similar distance. Only a very late goal denied the FAI XI victory.

In 1939 O'Flanagan also played twice for the League of Ireland XI, helping them to 2–1 victories against an Irish League XI and a Scottish League XI. He won his last three caps for the FAI XI while at Arsenal. These included the game against England on 30 September 1946 when his teammates included his brother, Mick O'Flanagan. He made his final appearance for the FAI XI on 4 May 1947 in 2–0 defeat against Portugal. In 1946, while at Arsenal, O'Flanagan also played in two Victory internationals for the IFA XI. On 2 February at Windsor Park he played for the IFA XI in a 3–2 defeat to Scotland. Then on 4 May he helped the IFA XI defeat Wales 1–0 at Ninian Park.

=== Rugby international ===
In 1942, while playing for UCD, O'Flanagan played for an Ireland XV against a British Army XV at Ravenhill. In 1946, while with London Irish, he played on the wing in an unofficial international against France. In 1947 he won his only official cap in a Test against Australia, a 16–3 defeat at Lansdowne Road.

== Sports administrator and doctor ==
O'Flanagan returned to Dublin in the 1950s and established a successful practice at Upper Fitzwilliam Street. He briefly revived his soccer career with Bohemians and remained involved in sport throughout the rest of his life. During subsequent decades he served on numerous bodies and held various positions in the areas of sports and medicine. These include:

- Vice-president of the Olympic Council of Ireland:
- Member of the International Olympic Committee: 1976–1994
  - IOC Drugs Panel: 1977–1999
  - IOC Medical Commission: 1980–1994
  - Olympic Programme Commission: 1993–1994
  - Honorary lifetime member of IOC: 1995
- Irish Representative on the Sports Medicine Committee of the Council of Europe:
- President of the Irish Sports Medicine Association:
- Chairman of the Irish National Rehabilitation Board
  - President of World Congress for Rehabilitation: 1969
- Council of People for the Handicapped, USA.
- Chief Medical Officer of Athletic Association of Ireland
- Chief Medical Officer at Bohemians:196x-197x
- Chief Medical Officer of Irish Olympic Team: 1960–1976

== Honours ==
Soccer Player

Bohemians

- Dublin and Belfast Intercity Cup: 1
  - Winners 1945
