= Mick O'Flanagan =

Irish former sportsman (1922–2015)

- Born: 29 September 1922; Dublin, Ireland
- Died: 13 September 2015 (aged 92); Dublin, Ireland
- Occupations: Associton footballer; rugby union player
Association football career
- Position: Centre forward
Youth career
- 19xx: Kenilworth
- 19xx: Home Farm
- 19xx: St. Patrick's C.Y.M.S.
Senior career*
Years	Team	Apps	(Gls)
1939–1952	Bohemians	78	(52)
1949	→ Belfast Celtic (guest)		
International career
1946	Ireland	1	(0)
- * Club domestic league appearances and goals

Rugby union career
- Position: Centre
Senior career
Years	Team	Apps	(Points)
- Lansdowne R.F.C.
International career
Years	Team	Apps	(Points)
1948	Ireland	1	(0)

Mick O'Flanagan (29 September 1922 – 13 September 2015) was an Irish sportsman who represented his country at both soccer and rugby union. As a soccer player, O'Flanagan played for, among others, Home Farm, Bohemians and Belfast Celtic. His older brother, Kevin O'Flanagan, was also a notable sportsman who also represented his country at both sports and played soccer for Bohs and Arsenal. On 30 September 1946, Mick and Kevin also played international soccer together for Ireland against England. A third brother, Charlie O'Flanagan, also played for Bohs.

== Bohemians ==
O'Flanagan played soccer as a youth with several clubs, most notably Home Farm, before joining Bohemians in 1939. He quickly established himself in the first team and was top goalscorer in the League of Ireland for the 1940–41 season, scoring 19 league goals. He also scored 31 times in 31 appearances in all competitions that season. In 1945, O'Flanagan, together with his brother Kevin, was a member of the Bohs team coached by Jimmy Dunne that won the Dublin and Belfast Intercity Cup. He also scored the winning goal in the final against Belfast Celtic at Dalymount Park.

On 30 September 1946, he was working a pub in Dublin when he received a desperate phone call at 2:30 p.m. asking him to substitute for an injured Irish player in a match against England due to start at 5:30 p.m. at Dalymount Park. He rushed out and managed to play alongside his brother in the match.

In the 1946-47 Leinster Senior Cup final, Mick would score an astonishing six goals in an 11–0 win for Bohemians over Grangegorman The 1946-47 season would be the last where O'Flanagan would play regularly for Bohemians, appearing only sporadically in the late 1940s and making a brief comeback in the 1951-52 season. In all competitions, O'Flanagan scored 127 goals in 188 appearances, including 52 goals in 78 League matches.

== Belfast Celtic ==
During the summer of 1949, O'Flanagan also guested for Belfast Celtic on their tour of North America. Other members of the touring party included Billy McMillan, Tom Aherne, Robin Lawler, Johnny Campbell and manager Elisha Scott. These were the last games Belfast Celtic played before the club disbanded. O'Flanagan scored twice during the tour. His first goal came on 12 May in a 5–0 win against Ulster United, and he scored again in a 4–0 win against Montreal All-Stars on 1 June. However, the highlight of the 10 game tour came on 29 May when Celtic beat Scotland 2–0 at Triborough Stadium. During the second half, fights broke out, including one between O'Flanagan and Scotland's Willie Waddell. That was the last time Scotland ever played a club side.

== Irish international ==
=== Soccer ===
O'Flanagan made his only appearance for Ireland on 30 September 1946 in a 1–0 defeat against England at Dalymount Park. Among his teammates that day was his brother Kevin. Mick was only called up as a late replacement for the injured Davy Walsh and he had spent the previous night entertaining a party of English journalists at Templeogue tennis club. The following morning, he went to work in his pub in Dublin and did not learn of his call up until just a few hours before the game was due to kick off.

=== Rugby ===
In 1947m O'Flanagan began playing rugby union with Lansdowne FC and on 28 February 1948 he played for Ireland against Scotland in a 6–0 win at Lansdowne Road. This helped an Ireland team, featuring Karl Mullen and Jack Kyle, win the Triple Crown, Grand Slam and the 1948 Five Nations Championship.

=== Personal life ===
Mick was a publican by trade, his sporting career, like that of his brother, being strictly amateur. He ran a pub at 88 Marlborough Street in Dublin's City Centre which is known today as the Confession Box due to its proximity to St. Mary's Pro-Cathedral. It was in this pub in 1960 that the Soccer Writers Association of Ireland was established.

== Honours ==
=== Soccer ===
Bohemians

- Dublin and Belfast Intercity Cup: 1
  - Winners 1945
- Leinster Senior Cup (association football): 1
  - Winners 1946-47

Individual

- League of Ireland Top Scorer:
  - 1940–41

=== Rugby ===
Ireland

- Five Nations Championship: 1
  - Winners 1948
