= Frank Grice =

English footballer and manager

Personal information
- Date of birth: 13 November 1908
- Place of birth: Derby, England
- Date of death: 1988 (aged 79–80)
- Height: 5 ft 10 1/2 in (1.79 m)
- Position: Midfielder

Senior career*
Years	Team	Apps	(Gls)
	Linby Colliery	?	(?)
1931–1935	Notts County	102	(4)
1935–1939	Tottenham Hotspur	47	(1)
	Glentoran	?	(?)
	Dundalk	?	(?)

Managerial career
- 1948–1955: Glentoran
- 1955–1959: Chelmsford City
- * Club domestic league appearances and goals

Frank Grice (13 November 1908 – 1988) was an English professional footballer who played for Linby Colliery, Notts County, Tottenham Hotspur, Glentoran and Dundalk.

== Football career ==
Grice began his career at Linby Colliery before joining Notts County. The midfielder played 102 matches and scored on four occasions for the Meadow Lane club between 1931 and 1935. In 1935, Grice signed for Tottenham Hotspur where he featured in a further 55 matches and scored once in all competitions. After leaving White Hart Lane he had spells at Glentoran and finally Dundalk.

== Management career ==
Grice held the post of Glentoran manager between 1948 and 1955.
