= 1942–43 League of Ireland =

Football season

League of Ireland
- Season: 1942–43
- Champions: Cork United (3rd title)
- Matches played: 90
- Goals scored: 339 (3.77 per match)
- Top goalscorer: Seán McCarthy (16 goals)
- Biggest home win: Limerick 7–0 Bray Unknowns
- Biggest away win: Bohemians 0–5 Shelbourne; Bray Unknowns 0–5 St James's Gate; Bray Unknowns 0–5 Dundalk
- Highest scoring: Bray Unknowns 5–4 Brideville

The 1942–43 League of Ireland was the 22nd season of senior football in the Republic of Ireland. Cork United were the defending champions.

== Changes from 1941–42 ==
No new teams were elected to the League.

== Teams ==
Locations of the 1942–43 League of Ireland teams

Team	Location	Stadium
Bohemians	Dublin (Phibsborough)	Dalymount Park
Bray Unknowns	Bray	Carlisle Grounds
Brideville	Dublin (The Liberties)	Harold's Cross Stadium
Cork United	Cork	Mardyke
Drumcondra	Dublin (Clonturk)	Clonturk Park
Dundalk	Dundalk	Oriel Park
Limerick	Limerick	Markets Field
St. James's Gate	Dublin (Drimnagh)	Iveagh Grounds
Shamrock Rovers	Dublin (Milltown)	Glenmalure Park
Shelbourne	Dublin (Ringsend)	Shelbourne Park

== Season overview ==
Cork United won their third title, becoming the first team to win three consecutive titles.

== Standings ==
Pos	Team	Pld	W	D	L	GF	GA	GD	Pts
1	Cork United	18	12	3	3	42	14	+28	27
2	Dundalk	18	11	4	3	40	22	+18	26
3	Drumcondra	18	9	5	4	47	34	+13	23
4	Shamrock Rovers	18	8	4	6	36	28	+8	20
5	Shelbourne	18	7	5	6	35	28	+7	19
6	St James's Gate	18	7	4	7	31	30	+1	18
7	Limerick	18	8	1	9	41	38	+3	17
8	Bohemians	18	6	4	8	28	34	−6	16
9	Brideville	18	3	5	10	25	39	−14	11
10	Bray Unknowns	18	1	1	16	14	72	−58	3

Source: RSSSF, Foot.dk

== Results ==
Home \ Away	BOH	BRY	BRI	CUF	DRU	DUN	LIM	SHM	SHE	STG
Bohemians	—	3–0	3–1	1–0	4–2	1–1	4–1	1–1	0–5	1–2
Bray Unknowns	1–1	—	5–4	0–4	1–4	0–5	2–4	1–2	0–2	0–5
Brideville	1–1	4–0	—	0–2	0–3	0–0	2–2	1–0	1–0	0–1
Cork United	4–0	5–0	2–0	—	1–1	1–0	4–3	1–1	3–0	4–1
Drumcondra	2–4	4–1	3–3	1–3	—	3–2	4–2	0–3	4–2	1–1
Dundalk	1–0	3–1	2–2	3–0	2–4	—	4–3	2–0	3–2	4–2
Limerick	3–1	7–0	5–1	1–0	0–2	1–3	—	0–2	2–0	3–1
Shamrock Rovers	1–0	7–1	3–2	1–4	2–6	0–2	5–1	—	3–4	3–0
Shelbourne	4–2	2–0	5–2	1–1	1–1	1–2	3–1	1–1	—	2–2
St James's Gate	4–1	6–1	2–1	0–3	2–2	1–1	0–2	1–1	0–0	—

Source: Extratime.ie
Legend: Blue = home team win; Yellow = draw; Red = away team win.

== Top goalscorers ==
Pos	Player	Club	Goals
1	(Republic of Ireland) (Ireland) Seán McCarthy	Cork United	16

== See also ==
- 1942–43 FAI Cup
