= 1949–50 League of Ireland =

League of Ireland
- Season: 1949–50
- Champions: Cork Athletic (1st title)
- Matches played: 90
- Goals scored: 316 (3.51 per match)
- Top goalscorer: David McCulloch (19 goals)
- Biggest home win: Dundalk 5–0 Transport; Shamrock Rovers 7–2 Bohemians; Cork Athletic 8-3 Limerick
- Biggest away win: Shamrock Rovers 2–5 Cork Athletic
- Highest scoring: Cork Athletic 8–3 Limerick

The 1949–50 League of Ireland was the 29th season of senior football in the Republic of Ireland.

== Changes from 1948–49 ==
No new teams were elected to the League.

== Teams ==
Locations of the 1949–50 League of Ireland teams

Team	Location	Stadium
Bohemians	Dublin (Phibsborough)	Dalymount Park
Cork Athletic	Cork	Mardyke
Drumcondra	Dublin (Clonturk)	Clonturk Park
Dundalk	Dundalk	Oriel Park
Limerick	Limerick	Markets Field
Shamrock Rovers	Dublin (Milltown)	Glenmalure Park
Shelbourne	Dublin (Ringsend)	Shelbourne Park
Sligo Rovers	Sligo	The Showgrounds
Transport	Bray	Carlisle Grounds
Waterford	Waterford	Kilcohan Park

== Season overview ==
Cork Athletic won their first title.

== Table ==
Pos	Team	Pld	W	D	L	GF	GA	GD	Pts
1	Cork Athletic	18	10	5	3	43	26	+17	25
2	Drumcondra	18	9	6	3	32	21	+11	24
3	Shelbourne	18	7	7	4	34	29	+5	21
4	Waterford	18	6	8	4	40	32	+8	20
5	Dundalk	18	7	5	6	35	31	+4	19
6	Sligo Rovers	18	7	5	6	28	30	−2	19
7	Shamrock Rovers	18	7	4	7	39	30	+9	18
8	Transport	18	4	6	8	23	29	−6	14
9	Limerick	18	2	8	8	26	42	−16	12
10	Bohemians	18	2	4	12	16	46	−30	8

Source: RSSSF, foot.dk

== Results ==
Home \ Away	BOH	CAT	DRU	DUN	LIM	SHM	SHE	SLI	TRA	WAT
Bohemians	—	1–1	0–0	3–5	2–0	2–2	0–1	1–2	0–0	0–4
Cork Athletic	2–1	—	1–2	1–0	8–3	3–0	3–1	2–2	3–2	2–0
Drumcondra	3–1	1–2	—	0–0	3–2	0–4	2–2	0–0	3–0	3–0
Dundalk	2–1	3–2	1–1	—	2–1	1–1	3–2	0–0	5–0	2–1
Limerick	0–0	2–2	1–1	3–3	—	4–3	1–1	2–1	1–1	1–1
Shamrock Rovers	7–2	2–5	0–1	3–1	4–0	—	3–1	5–1	1–2	4–1
Shelbourne	4–0	1–1	0–0	4–3	3–1	3–0	—	2–2	3–1	3–3
Sligo Rovers	3–1	2–1	2–4	2–1	2–0	1–0	4–0	—	0–1	1–1
Transport	5–0	1–2	1–2	1–3	1–1	1–1	1–2	3–0	—	0–0
Waterford	4–1	2–2	4–3	5–2	4–3	2–2	1–1	6–3	2–2	—

Source: Extratime.ie
Legend: Blue = home team win; Yellow = draw; Red = away team win.

== Top goalscorers ==
Rank	Player	Club	Goals
1	(Scotland) David McCulloch	Waterford	19
2	(Republic of Ireland) Patrick O'Leary	Cork Athletic	13
3	(Republic of Ireland) Johnny Vaughan	Cork Athletic	12
4	(Republic of Ireland) Bobby Duffy	Shamrock Rovers	11
5	(Republic of Ireland) Jimmy Duggan	Transport	9
5	(Republic of Ireland) Dessie Glynn	Drumcondra	9
7	(Republic of Ireland) Austin Curtin	Waterford	8
7	(Republic of Ireland) Sam Waters	Sligo Rovers	8
9	(Republic of Ireland) Joe Ralph	Dundalk	7
10	(Republic of Ireland) Dan Lavery	Dundalk	6
10	(Republic of Ireland) Jackie O'Reilly	Cork Athletic	6
