= 1941–42 League of Ireland =

League of Ireland
- Season: 1941–42
- Champions: Cork United (2nd title)
- Matches played: 90
- Goals scored: 366 (4.07 per match)
- Top goalscorer: Thomas Byrne (20 goals)

The 1941–42 League of Ireland was the 21st season of the League of Ireland. Cork United were the defending champions.

Cork United won their second title, becoming only the second team to successfully defend their title.

== Overview ==
Waterford resigned from the League voluntarily, resulting in a reduction in size from eleven to ten teams.

== Teams ==
Locations of the 1941–42 League of Ireland teams

Team	Location	Stadium
Bohemians	Dublin (Phibsborough)	Dalymount Park
Bray Unknowns	Bray	Carlisle Grounds
Brideville	Dublin (The Liberties)	Harold's Cross Stadium
Cork United	Cork	Mardyke
Drumcondra	Dublin (Clonturk)	Clonturk Park
Dundalk	Dundalk	Oriel Park
Limerick	Limerick	Markets Field
St. James's Gate	Dublin (Drimnagh)	Iveagh Grounds
Shamrock Rovers	Dublin (Milltown)	Glenmalure Park
Shelbourne	Dublin (Ringsend)	Shelbourne Park

== Table ==
Pos	Team	Pld	W	D	L	GF	GA	GD	Pts
1	Cork United	18	13	4	1	54	20	+34	30
2	Shamrock Rovers	18	12	4	2	52	23	+29	28
3	Shelbourne	18	8	5	5	38	29	+9	21
4	Dundalk	18	8	3	7	45	36	+9	19
5	St James's Gate	18	6	5	7	41	35	+6	19 (Note: Limerick fielded an ineligible player during the match with St James's Gate. The original result – a 3-1 win to Limerick – was annulled and the match awarded to St James's Gate.)
6	Brideville	18	5	7	6	29	44	−15	17
7	Limerick	18	7	3	8	32	33	−1	15
8	Bohemians	18	4	6	8	29	36	−7	14
9	Drumcondra	18	4	6	8	29	49	−20	14
10	Bray Unknowns	18	0	3	15	17	61	−44	3

Source: www.rsssf.com

== Results ==
Home \ Away	BOH	BRY	BRI	CUF	DRU	DUN	LIM	SHM	SHE	STG
Bohemians	—	4–0	2–3	0–1	0–4	0–0	1–0	1–1	3–4	2–2
Bray Unknowns	2–2	—	1–2	0–2	2–2	1–4	2–4	0–1	1–2	1–7
Brideville	3–2	2–2	—	1–6	2–2	2–1	3–2	1–3	0–0	1–4
Cork United	2–1	4–0	3–0	—	4–0	3–1	3–2	2–3	3–0	5–0
Drumcondra	2–4	2–1	2–2	4–4	—	0–2	2–2	0–6	2–1	2–1
Dundalk	3–3	4–1	4–1	2–2	6–2	—	2–0	2–1	3–1	2–3
Limerick	3–1	6–0	1–1	1–4	3–0	4–1	—	2–0	0–5	+:- (Note: The result of the match between Limerick and St James's Gate (3–1) was canceled and counted as a goalless win for St James's Gate because Limerick fielded an unauthorized player. In addition, two points were deducted from Limerick and these were credited to St. James.)
Shamrock Rovers	1–1	7–1	4–0	4–4	2–1	5–4	2–1	—	7–1	2–0
Shelbourne	4–0	3–0	1–1	0–1	1–1	3–1	5–0	2–2	—	4–4
St James's Gate	1–2	3–2	4–4	1–1	6–1	4–3	1–1	0–1	0–1	—

Legend: Blue = home team win; Yellow = draw; Red = away team win.

== Top goalscorers ==
Pos	Player	Club	Goals
1	Thomas Byrne	Limerick	20
