= 1944–45 League of Ireland =

League of Ireland
- Season: 1944–45
- Champions: Cork United (4th title)
- Matches played: 56
- Goals scored: 229 (4.09 per match)
- Top goalscorer: Seán McCarthy (26 goals)
- Biggest home win: Limerick 9–1 Dundalk
- Biggest away win: Brideville 0–9 Cork United
- Highest scoring: Brideville 4–7 Drumcondra

The 1944–45 League of Ireland was the 24th season of senior football in the Republic of Ireland. Shelbourne were the defending champions.

== Changes from 1943–44 ==
St James's Gate failed to be re-elected and were replaced by Brideville, who returned after a one-year absence.

== Teams ==
Locations of the 1944–45 League of Ireland teams

Team	Location	Stadium
Bohemians	Dublin (Phibsborough)	Dalymount Park
Brideville	Dublin (The Liberties)	Harold's Cross Stadium
Cork United	Cork	Mardyke
Drumcondra	Dublin (Clonturk)	Clonturk Park
Dundalk	Dundalk	Oriel Park
Limerick	Limerick	Markets Field
Shamrock Rovers	Dublin (Milltown)	Glenmalure Park
Shelbourne	Dublin (Ringsend)	Shelbourne Park

== Season overview ==
Cork United won their fourth title in five years.

== Table ==
Pos	Team	Pld	W	D	L	GF	GA	GD	Pts
1	Cork United	14	11	0	3	59	24	+35	22
2	Limerick	14	7	3	4	38	25	+13	17
3	Shamrock Rovers	14	6	5	3	20	20	0	17
4	Drumcondra	14	5	5	4	32	32	0	15
5	Shelbourne	14	5	3	6	21	21	0	13
6	Dundalk	14	4	3	7	22	33	−11	11
7	Brideville	14	2	5	7	20	44	−24	9
8	Bohemians	14	2	4	8	17	30	−13	8

Source: RSSSF, Foot.dk

== Results ==
Home \ Away	BOH	BRI	CUF	DRU	DUN	LIM	SHM	SHE
Bohemians	—	1–1	2–4	0–1	2–1	0–0	1–1	3–1
Brideville	2–1	—	0–9	4–7	2–1	2–2	0–0	0–3
Cork United	4–1	5–1	—	6–1	3–2	3–2	6–0	5–4
Drumcondra	4–4	3–1	3–1	—	4–2	1–1	0–0	0–1
Dundalk	3–0	2–2	1–5	2–2	—	3–0	1–1	1–0
Limerick	1–0	6–3	5–4	5–3	9–1	—	3–0	3–0
Shamrock Rovers	4–2	2–0	3–2	3–1	3–1	2–0	—	1–3
Shelbourne	3–0	2–2	1–2	2–2	0–1	3–1	0–0	—

Source: Extratime.ie
Legend: Blue = home team win; Yellow = draw; Red = away team win.

== Top goalscorers ==
Pos	Player	Club	Goals
1	(Republic of Ireland) (Ireland) Seán McCarthy	Cork United	26
