= Johnny McGowan =

Irish footballer

Personal information
- Date of birth: 8 June 1920
- Place of birth: Passage, Cork
- Date of death: 30 March 2010 (aged 89)
- Position: Defender

Youth career
- Cobh Wanderers

Senior career*
Years	Team	Apps	(Gls)
- Cork United
- West Ham United

International career
1947	Republic of Ireland	1	(0)
- * Club domestic league appearances and goals

Johnny McGowan (8 June 1920 – 30 March 2010) was a Republic of Ireland soccer international, who played with the Cork United team which dominated domestic Irish soccer in the 1940s. He also had a short spell in England with West Ham United.

He was also for many years a manager in the League of Ireland.

McGowan was a full back or centre half and was capped once for the Republic of Ireland at senior level in a 3–2 win over Spain in Dalymount Park on 2 March 1947.
