= John Lavery (footballer, born 1919) =

Northern Irish footballer (1919–1997)

Personal information
- Date of birth: 24 November 1919
- Place of birth: Belfast, Ireland
- Date of death: 30 January 1997 (aged 77)
- Place of death: Belfast, Northern Ireland
- Position: Left winger

Senior career*
Years	Team	Apps	(Gls)
1936–1941	Glentoran		
1941–1944	Dundalk	44	(17)
1944–1948	Glentoran		
1948	Bradford City	5	(0)
1948–1949	Halifax Town	3	(1)
- Linfield
Total		52	(18)
- * Club domestic league appearances and goals

John Lavery (24 November 1919 – 30 January 1997) was a Northern Irish professional footballer who played as a left winger.

== Career ==
Born in Belfast, Lavery signed for Bradford City in June 1948, leaving the club in September 1948 to play for Halifax Town. He began his career with Glentoran and Dundalk.

He played for Northern Ireland Schools and the League of Ireland XI.

During his time with Bradford City he made five appearances in the Football League.

During his time with Halifax he made three appearances in the Football League, scoring once.

He ended his career back in Northern Ireland with Linfield.

He died in Belfast on 30 January 1997.

== Sources ==
- Frost, Terry (1988). Bradford City A Complete Record 1903-1988. Breedon Books Sport. ISBN 0-907969-38-0.
