= Paddy Coad =

Irish footballer and manager

Personal information
- Full name: Patrick Coad
- Date of birth: 14 April 1920
- Place of birth: Waterford, Ireland
- Date of death: 8 March 1992 (aged 71)
- Place of death: Waterford, Ireland
- Position: Inside forward

Youth career
- 1936: Corinthians

Senior career*
Years	Team	Apps	(Gls)
1937–1939	Waterford	?	(8)
1939	Glenavon	0	(0)
1939–1942	Waterford	?	(13)
1942–1959	Shamrock Rovers	274	(104)
1959–1961	Waterford	27	(1)

International career
1943–1955	League of Ireland XI	26	(2)
1946–1952	Ireland	11	(3)

Managerial career
- 1949–1960: Shamrock Rovers
- 1960–1963: Waterford
- 1964–1967: Waterford
- 1967–1968: Limerick
- * Club domestic league appearances and goals

Paddy Coad (14 April 1920 – 8 March 1992) was an Irish football player and manager.

He played as a forward for Waterford, Glenavon, Shamrock Rovers and Ireland. Although known, primarily, as a maker of goals, Coad scored 126 goals in the League of Ireland, putting him as 24th all-time, and a further 41 in the FAI Cup. In 1946–47, he was top goalscorer in the League of Ireland. As a player manager, he also guided Shamrock Rovers to three League of Ireland titles and two FAI Cups, before he returned to Waterford and guided them to their first league title in 1966. He won the Texaco Hall of Fame Award in 1981 and the PFAI Merit Award in 1983.

== Early life ==
Coad was educated at De La Salle school in Stephen Street in Waterford and first distinguished himself as a sportsman playing hurling and table tennis. He was even Munster champion at the latter sport. He also began to play football with Corinthians, a local junior club based in Lower Yellow Road area of Waterford.

== Club career ==
He was soon spotted by Waterford, making his League of Ireland debut in 1937 while still only 17. He then moved to Irish Football League club Glenavon but returned to Waterford after the start of the Second World War. He was a member of the Waterford team that finished as a runners up to Cork United in both the League of Ireland and the FAI Cup. Waterford could have won the league title, but their players refused to turn up for a play-off game against Cork after a dispute over bonus payments.

Coad signed for Shamrock Rovers in 1942 and made his debut against Brideville in the FAI Cup on 8 February. During his early seasons with the club, he played alongside Peter Farrell, Tommy Eglington, Jimmy McAlinden and Tommy Breen. He also helped Rovers win the FAI Cup three times. On 2 May 1955, Coad was rewarded with a benefit game against Chelsea, with Rovers winning 3–2. The Shamrock Rovers Player of the Year trophy is named after Coad.

== International career ==
Between 1946 and 1952, Coad also made 11 appearances and scored 3 goals for Ireland. He made his debut on 30 September 1946 in a 1–0 defeat to England. On 2 March 1947, he scored his first goal for Ireland in a 3–2 win against Spain. During this game, Coad also set up both of Ireland's other goals for Davy Walsh. On 22 May 1949, he scored the only goal, a penalty, in a 1–0 win over Portugal. His third goal for Ireland came on 30 May 1951 in 3–2 away win over Norway. Ireland were 2–0 down until Peter Farrell and Alf Ringstead levelled the score. Then in the 82nd minute, Coad scored from 20 yards to win the game. Coad played his last game for Ireland in a 6–0 away defeat against Spain on 1 June 1952.

== Managerial career ==
In November 1949, after the untimely death of Jimmy Dunne, Coad reluctantly accepted the position of player manager at Shamrock Rovers. He brought in many young players, including Liam Tuohy, and the team became known as Coad's Colts. The Colts won 19 trophies between 1954 and 1959. Under the guidance of Coad, Rovers won three League of Ireland titles and the FAI Cup twice. In 1957, they also made their debut in the European Cup. Despite losing 9–2 on aggregate to Manchester United, Coad at the age of 37, dominated the away game at Old Trafford. He made two appearances in the European Cup.

Coad returned home to manage the Blues in 1960. In the 1965–66 League of Ireland season, Waterford won the Championship for the first time. Coad reflected on his legacy: "To bring the first title to my native Waterford leaves everything else in the shade." He was appointed manager of Limerick in September 1967.

== Personal life ==
Coad's wife, Kathleen, was the daughter of the then Shamrock Rovers chairman, Joe Cunningham.

His brother, Seamus, played for Waterford in the late 1960s and managed them in the 1990s. Seamus' sons Gary Coad and Nigel Coad continued the family name by lining out for the Blues under their father before both going on to win many trophies locally. Amazingly, both Gary and Nigel became only the third set of second generation brothers to play together for Waterford, following Paddy and Seamus, the Hales and Fitzgeralds. In 2012, Seamus' grandson, Conor, became the latest Coad to play for Waterford. Coad's brother was also capped for Ireland, and his nephews were capped at under age level.

== Honours ==
- League of Ireland top scorer – 1946–47

== International ==
Appearances and goals by national team and year
National team	Year	Apps	Goals
Republic of Ireland	1946	1	0
Republic of Ireland	1947	2	1
Republic of Ireland	1948	3	0
Republic of Ireland	1949	3	1
Republic of Ireland	1950	-	-
Republic of Ireland	1951	1	1
Republic of Ireland	1952	1	0
Total		11	3

== Sources ==
- Paul Doolan; Robert Goggins. The Hoops. ISBN 0-7171-2121-6.
- Paul Keane. Gods vs Mortals: Irish Clubs in Europe: A Front Row Seat at 10 of the Greatest Games. ISBN 0956359841.
