= 1940–41 League of Ireland =

League of Ireland
- Season: 1940–41
- Champions: Cork United (1st title)
- Matches played: 110
- Goals scored: 461 (4.19 per match)
- Top goalscorer: Michael O'Flanagan (19 goals)

The 1940–41 League of Ireland was the twentieth season of the League of Ireland. St James's Gate were the defending champions.

Cork United won their first title.

== Overview ==
Sligo Rovers resigned from the league voluntarily, resulting in a reduction in size from twelve to eleven teams.

After finishing with the same number of points, Cork United and Waterford were due to contest a Championship playoff at the Mardyke on 11 May 1941. However, Waterford refused to compete due to a failure to agree terms for the playoff and Cork United were subsequently awarded the title.

== Teams ==
Locations of the 1939–40 League of Ireland teams

Team	Location	Stadium
Bohemians	Dublin (Phibsborough)	Dalymount Park
Bray Unknowns	Bray	Carlisle Grounds
Brideville	Dublin (The Liberties)	Harold's Cross Stadium
Cork United	Cork	Mardyke
Drumcondra	Dublin (Clonturk)	Clonturk Park
Dundalk	Dundalk	Oriel Park
Limerick	Limerick	Markets Field
St. James's Gate	Dublin (Drimnagh)	Iveagh Grounds
Shamrock Rovers	Dublin (Milltown)	Glenmalure Park
Shelbourne	Dublin (Ringsend)	Shelbourne Park
Waterford	Waterford	Kilcohan Park

== Table ==
Pos	Team	Pld	W	D	L	GF	GA	GD	Pts
1	Cork United	20	13	4	3	50	23	+27	30
2	Waterford	20	14	2	4	62	31	+31	30
3	Bohemians	20	9	5	6	52	44	+8	23
4	Shamrock Rovers	20	9	3	8	48	43	+5	21
5	St James's Gate	20	9	3	8	44	41	+3	21
6	Drumcondra	20	8	4	8	44	50	−6	20
7	Dundalk	20	9	1	10	43	42	+1	19
8	Brideville	20	7	2	11	39	57	−18	16
9	Limerick	20	6	4	10	27	44	−17	16
10	Shelbourne	20	3	9	8	23	31	−8	15
11	Bray Unknowns	20	3	3	14	29	55	−26	9

Source: www.rsssf.com

== Results ==
Home \ Away	BOH	BRY	BRI	CUF	DRU	DUN	LIM	SHM	SHE	STG	WAT
Bohemians	—	2–2	2–2	1–3	6–4	6–1	6–2	2–2	2–2	1–2	5–1
Bray Unknowns	1–3	—	3–1	1–3	3–4	3–1	2–2	0–2	0–0	3–1	2–4
Brideville	2–3	2–1	—	1–3	3–0	2–1	0–2	1–3	1–0	0–1	2–2
Cork United	1–2	2–1	7–1	—	1–1	1–0	4–1	4–2	2–1	5–0	1–2
Drumcondra	2–1	5–1	0–0	1–4	—	1–0	3–2	6–1	2–2	3–5	3–2
Dundalk	4–0	6–1	2–0	1–3	5–3	—	7–2	4–1	2–0	3–2	0–3
Limerick	4–2	4–0	2–4	0–3	2–4	3–0	—	1–4	1–2	1–5	3–2
Shamrock Rovers	3–4	3–1	5–0	0–0	4–1	2–2	5–1	—	3–1	1–5	2–3
Shelbourne	2–2	3–1	0–0	2–2	1–1	0–2	0–1	0–2	—	3–2	1–2
St James's Gate	1–2	2–1	1–2	1–1	1–0	4–2	2–2	4–3	2–2	—	1–2
Waterford	3–0	5–2	6–3	4–0	6–0	5–0	2–3	3–0	1–1	4–2	—

Legend: Blue = home team win; Yellow = draw; Red = away team win.

== Championship playoff ==
After finishing with the same number of points, Cork United and Waterford were due to contest a Championship playoff at the Mardyke on 11 May 1941. However, Waterford refused to compete due to a failure to agree terms for the playoff, and Cork United were subsequently awarded the title.

11 May 1941

Cork United	w/o	Waterford

Mardyke, Cork

== Top goalscorers ==
Pos	Player	Club	Goals
1	Michael O'Flanagan	Bohemians	19
