= Kevin McAlinden =

Northern Ireland footballer

Personal information
- Date of birth: 17 November 1913
- Place of birth: Northern Ireland
- Date of death: 3 April 1978 (aged 64)
- Position: Goalkeeper

Senior career*
Years	Team	Apps	(Gls)
- Belfast Celtic

International career
1948	Great Britain	2	(0)
- * Club domestic league appearances and goals

Kevin McAlinden (17 November 1913 – 3 April 1978) was a footballer from Northern Ireland who represented Great Britain at the 1948 Summer Olympics. McAlinden played amateur football as a goalkeeper with Belfast Celtic.
