= Gerry Malone (footballer) =

Irish footballer (1925–2006)

Personal information
- Date of birth: 1925
- Date of death: 27 November 2006 (aged 80–81)
- Position: Forward

Senior career*
Years	Team	Apps	(Gls)
1944–1956	Shelbourne		

International career
1949	Republic of Ireland	1	(0)
- * Club domestic league appearances and goals

Gerry Malone (1925 – 27 November 2006) was an Irish footballer who played with Shelbourne in the 1940s and 1950s and who made one appearance for the Republic of Ireland national team.

Dublin born Malone was a forward and was capped once for the Republic of Ireland at senior level, at home to Belgium in April 1949.

He was on the losing side in two FAI Cup finals with Shelbourne in 1949 and 1951 but played in the league title winning teams in the 1946–47 and 1955–56 seasons.
