= Cork United F.C. (1940–1948) =

Defunct association football club in Ireland

Cork United
- Full name: Cork United Football Club
- Founded: 1940
- Dissolved: 1948
- Ground: The Mardyke
- League: League of Ireland
Home colours

Cork United Football Club was a League of Ireland club based in Cork from 1940 until 1948.

== History ==
Cork United was formed in February 1940 upon the dissolution of Cork City. The new club took Cork City's place and that season's playing record in the League of Ireland. The new club enjoyed a golden age in the early 1940s, winning five league titles, before disbanding and resigning from the league on 10 October 1948. Another new club, Cork Athletic was immediately formed to take its place.

== Colours ==
The club wore green jerseys. The team's initial kit was green shirts with white collars and the club used the Cork Coat of Arms as its crest.

== Honours ==
- League of Ireland
  - Winners (5): 1940–41, 1941–42, 1942–43, 1944–45, 1945–46
- FAI Cup
  - Winners (2): 1940–41, 1946–47
- League of Ireland Shield
  - 1942–43, 1947–48
- Dublin City Cup
  - 1943–44, 1945–46
- Munster Senior Cup
  - 1940–41, 1944–45 (Reserves), 1946–47

=== Season placings ===
Chart of yearly table positions for Cork United in League of Ireland

Season	Position
1947–48	6th
1946–47	4th
1945–46	1st
1944–45	1st
1943–44	5th
1942–43	1st
1941–42	1st
1940–41	1st
1939–40	5th

== Notable former players ==
Ireland (FAI) internationals

- (Republic of Ireland) Florrie Burke
- (Republic of Ireland) Ned Courtney
- (Ireland) (Republic of Ireland) Bill Hayes
- (Ireland) (Republic of Ireland) Owen Madden
- (Republic of Ireland) Johnny McGowan
- (Republic of Ireland) Tommy Moroney
- (Ireland) (Republic of Ireland) Jackie O'Driscoll
- (Republic of Ireland) Frank O'Farrell
- (Republic of Ireland) Jack O'Reilly

Ireland (IFA) internationals

- (Ireland) (Republic of Ireland) Bill Hayes
- (Ireland) (Republic of Ireland) Owen Madden
- (Ireland) (Republic of Ireland) Sean McCarthy
- (Ireland) (Republic of Ireland) Jackie O'Driscoll

Great Britain international

- (United Kingdom) Kevin McAlinden

League of Ireland Top Scorer

Season	Player	Goals
1942–43	(Republic of Ireland) (Ireland) Sean McCarthy	16
1943–44	(Republic of Ireland) (Ireland) Sean McCarthy	16
1944–45	(Republic of Ireland) (Ireland) Sean McCarthy	26
1945–46	Paddy O'Leary	15
1947–48	(Republic of Ireland) (Ireland) Sean McCarthy	13

Other sports

- (Republic of Ireland) Ned Courtney – played Gaelic football for Cork
- (Republic of Ireland) Tommy Moroney – played rugby union for Munster

== See also ==
- Cork F.C.
- Cork City F.C. (1938–1940)
- Cork Athletic F.C.
- League of Ireland in Cork city
