= Sean McCarthy (footballer, born 1922) =

Irish footballer

Personal information
- Date of birth: 22 January 1922
- Place of birth: Dunmanway, County Cork, Ireland
- Date of death: 14 August 2006 (aged 84)
- Height: 5 ft 11 in (1.80 m)
- Position: Striker

Senior career*
Years	Team	Apps	(Gls)
1940–1945	Cork United	?	(82)
1945–1946	Belfast Celtic	?	(56)
1947–1948	Cork United	?	(23)
1948–1949	Dartford F.C.	?	(21)
1949–1950	Bristol City	3	(0)
1950–1955	Evergreen United	?	(33)
Total		?	(215)

International career
1944–1945	League of Ireland XI	3	(3)
- * Club domestic league appearances and goals

Sean McCarthy (22 January 1922 – 14 August 2006) was an Irish football player from County Cork who enjoyed considerable success with Cork United in the 1940s and was the League of Ireland top scorer on four occasions.

== Early life ==
McCarthy was born in Dunmanway in West Cork in 1922 and began playing football for local side Clifton before being recruited by Cork United at the age of 18. Often referred to as "Big" Seanie to differentiate him from a smaller teammate of the same name, McCarthy was 5 foot 11 inches tall but in his early days especially was known for his slim build.

== Club career ==
McCarthy scored on his debut in a 1–1 draw with Shamrock Rovers and helped Cork to the title in his first season (1940–41) as well as winning the FAI Cup after a replay with Waterford F.C. McCarthy scored eleven league goals that season with a further three in the Cup, including a goal in the replayed final.

McCarthy's success continued and he helped Cork United to four league titles in five seasons. McCarthy was top scorer three year consecutively, 1942–43, 1943–44, and 1944–45 scoring 16, 16 and 26 goals respectively. In 1944 he was selected for the League of Ireland XI for the first time, eventually making three appearances for the League and scoring three times, all in games versus the Irish League.

Despite being a full-time professional at Cork United in 1945 a significantly improved salary offer from Belfast Celtic tempted Seán to Belfast where he enjoyed continued goalscoring success, scoring 56 goals in all competitions and helping Belfast Celtic win a wartime Gold Cup.

McCarthy returned to Cork United during the 1946–47 season and was instrumental in leading Cork City to the FAI Cup final against Bohemians which Cork won after a replay with McCarthy scoring in both the original match and replayed final.

Financial problems saw Cork United fold in 1948 which resulted in McCarthy moving to Dagenham to work in the Ford factory there. While in England he found success in the Southern Football League with Dartford F.C. scoring 21 goals in his only season at that level. Unconstrained by the maximum wage which capped salaries in English league football, non league clubs like Dartford could pay players whatever salary they wanted. Success at Dartford saw McCarthy sign for Bob Wright at Bristol City in the summer of 1949 though he time there was shortlived and he returned to Cork soon afterwards.

When back in Cork, McCarthy joined Evergreen United in the Munster Senior League and stayed with them after they were elected to the League of Ireland. He played with Evergreen during their first four seasons in the League of Ireland and featured on the runners-up side as Evergreen lost the 1953 FAI Cup final to Cork Athletic who were led by player-manager Raich Carter.

== Later life ==
McCarthy retired from football in 1955 and once again moved to England where he worked until retirement in 1987, at which time he once again returned to Cork to spend his retirement years. He died in August 2006.
