= Mardyke (UCC) =

Sports campus in Mardyke, Cork, Ireland

The Mardyke
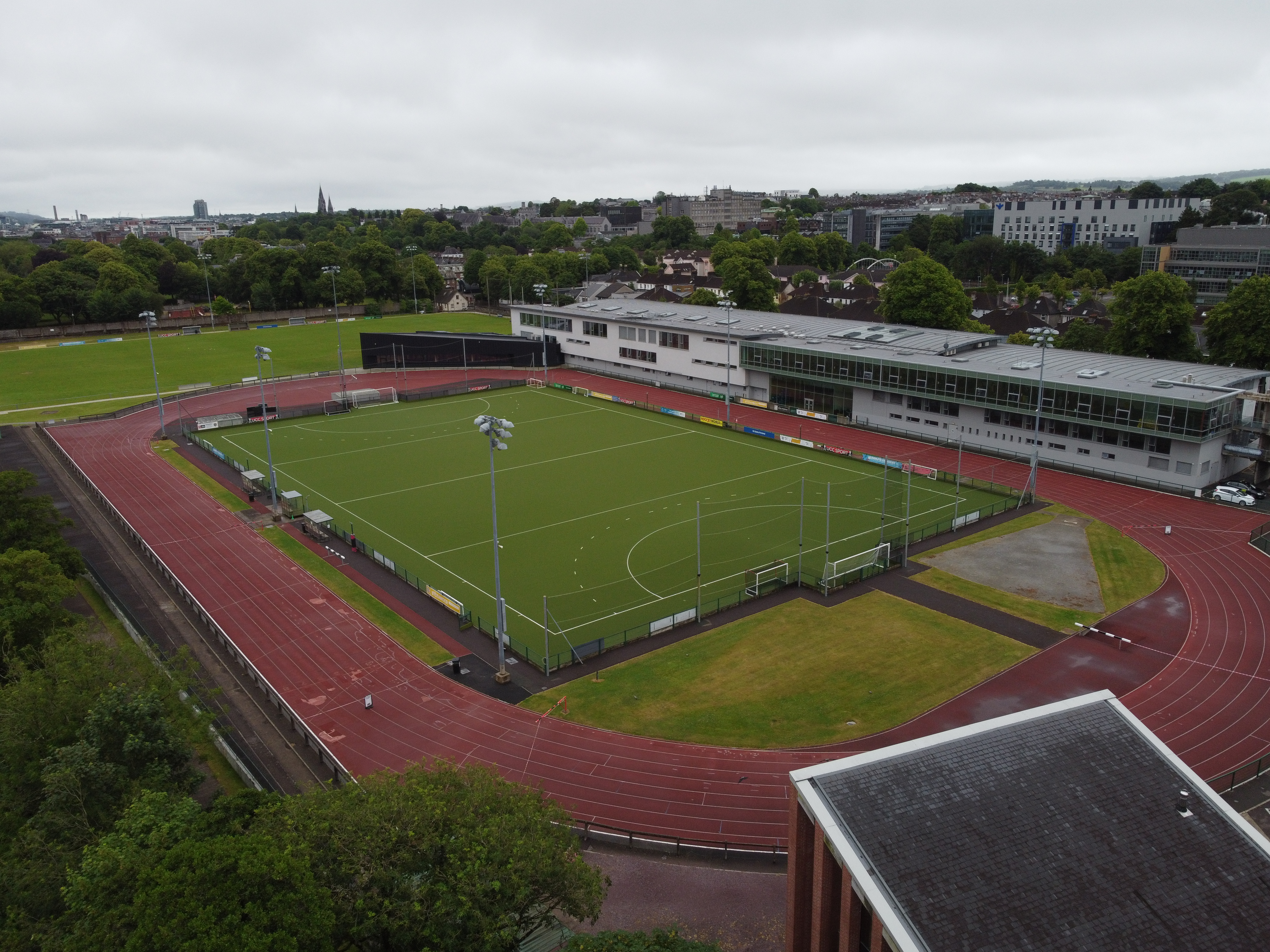
- The grounds in 2024
- Interactive map of The Mardyke
- Former names: College Athletic Grounds
- Location: Mardyke; Cork; Ireland
- Coordinates: 51.8951°N 8.5008°W
- Owner: University College Cork

Construction
- Opened: 1904
- Renovated: 2001, 2009

Tenants
- Current: UCC RFC; UCC AFC; UCC Demons; UCC GAA; Past: Cork Constitution; Fordsons/Cork FC; Cork City; Cork Utd; Cork Athletic; Cork Hibernians

The Mardyke, also referred as the Mardyke Sports Ground, is the main (Note: UCC has also maintained unenclosed grass pitches at "The Farm" near Curraheen southwest of the city.) sports campus of University College Cork (UCC), located at the western end of the Mardyke area near Cork city centre.

The grounds and fitness facilities are used by sports teams representing the general student body and members of the public. Outdoors, there are floodlit grass and all-weather pitches, used for soccer, rugby union, Gaelic games, and hockey. Kayakers train in the adjacent North channel of the River Lee. There is a tartan track for athletics, where the Cork City Sports was previously held. The most notable performance came in the hammer throw on 3 July 1984, when the world record was broken six times in one evening by Yuriy Sedykh and Sergey Litvinov.

== History ==
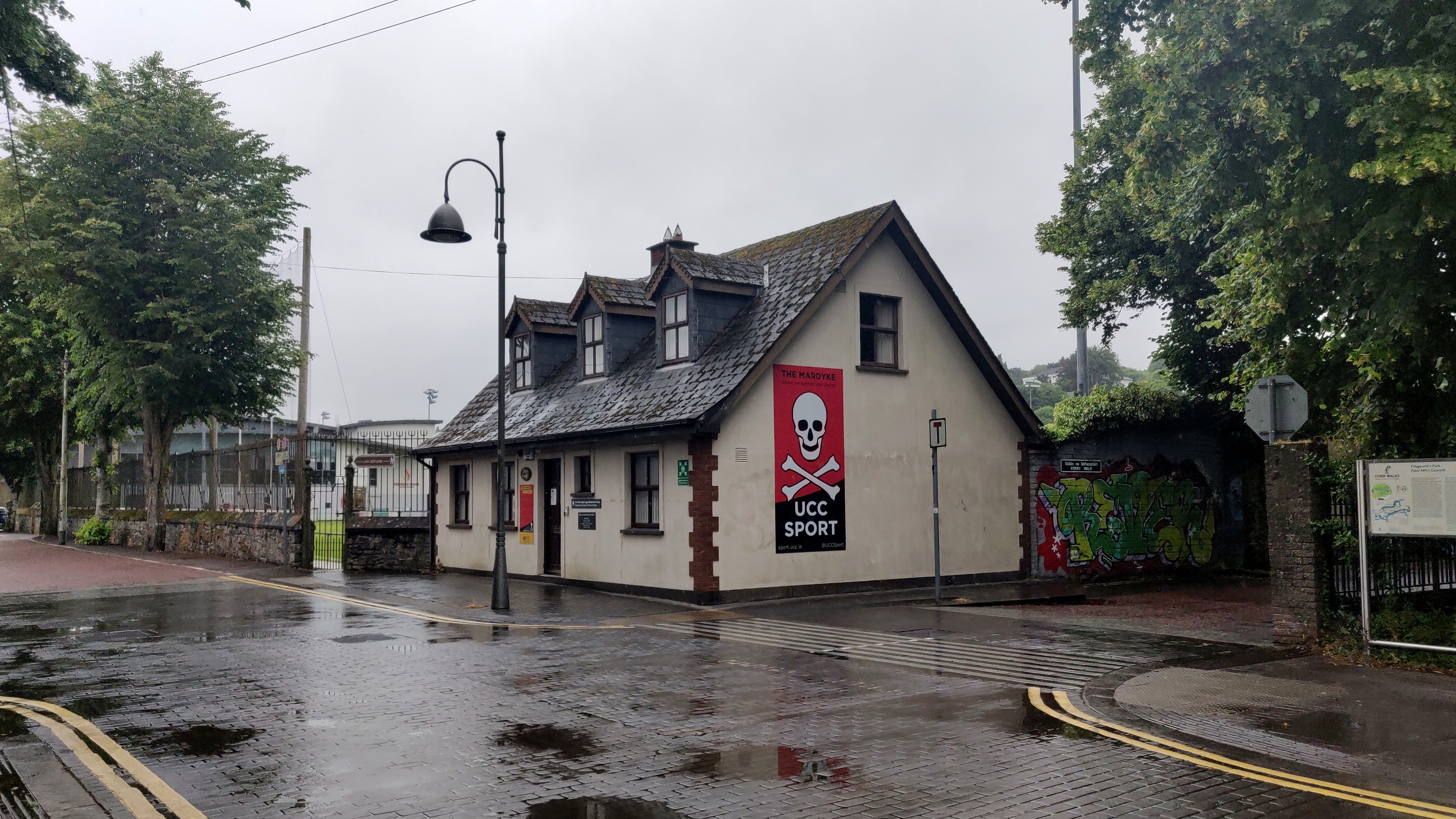
UCC Sports Office at the entrance to the grounds

The College Athletics Grounds were formed from the western parts of Cork Park, the eastern remainder of which is now called Fitzgerald's Park. From the 1870s, sports were played at Cork Park; its being unenclosed hindered the charging of admission to spectators. Important Cork GAA matches were played there until Cork Athletic Grounds opened in 1904. Rugby matches were mostly played at Cork Park, or occasionally at the Mardyke cricket ground to its east, which was enclosed but available seldom and at a high charge. When Cork Park staged the 1902 Cork International Exhibition, its Western Pitch was enclosed. In 1904, two rugby clubs, Cork Constitution and Cork County, took a lease on the Western Pitch. Subsequent references to "the Mardyke" as a venue for sports other than cricket generally refer to the Western Pitch. The two clubs deposited a £200 bond to the IRFU to persuade it stage an international there in 1905, and spent £1,500 on upgrades including a grandstand. They could not service the debt, and UCC took over the lease in 1911 and acquired the grounds outright in 1912.

UCC rented the Western Pitch to rugby, soccer, hockey and hurling clubs in the city for a 15% cut of the gate receipts. The Gaelic Athletic Association (GAA)'s ban on rugby and soccer applied to all players but did not apply to pitches not owned by GAA clubs, although during the Irish revolutionary period there was occasional tension between UCC GAA and UCC RFC and UCC AFC over the shared facilities.

The Mardyke facilities were severely damaged when the River Lee burst its banks on 19 November 2009. The Mardyke Arena reopened on 15 February 2010 after repairs costing €4m.

== Mardyke Arena ==
The Mardyke Arena, an indoor sports centre that opened in 2001, contains a gymnasium, a 25m swimming pool and three basketball courts as well as other sports facilities. It is the home court of UCC Demons, a basketball team affiliated with the College though not limited to students.

== Association football ==
The Mardyke was formerly an important venue for association football in Cork city. It was the home ground for several League of Ireland clubs in Cork city, including Fordsons, Cork F.C., Cork City, Cork United, Cork Athletic and Cork Hibernians. A crowd of 18,000 watched a friendly match in 1939 between Ireland and Hungary, the first international arranged by the FAI to be played outside Dublin. It is still regularly used by University College Cork A.F.C., hosting the 2009 Collingwood Cup, the 2015 Crowley Cup and a 2015 League of Ireland Cup quarter-final against Dundalk.

Ireland International Football Matches
Date	Home	Score	Opponent	Competition	Attendance
17 March 1939	Ireland	2–2	Hungary	Friendly	18,000

== Rugby ==
The Mardyke was the most important rugby ground in Cork from 1904 until Munster Rugby developed Musgrave Park in the 1950s. Munster matches against touring sides alternated between the Mardyke and Thomond Park in Limerick.

Representative rugby matches at the Mardyke
Home	Score	Away	Date	Event	Attendance	Report
Ireland	17–3	England	11 February 1905	Home Nations	12,000	
Ireland	25–5	France	25 March 1911	Five Nations	25,000	
Ireland	24–0	France	24 March 1913	Five Nations	6,000	
Munster	5–6	Australia	9 December 1947	Tour		
Munster	3–5	New Zealand	13 January 1954	Tour	7,000	

== Structure and facilities ==
The Mardyke Sports Grounds have three main pitches and a tartan track for athletics.

=== Athletics track ===
The Sonia O'Sullivan Athletics Track is an eight lane, 400m synthetic running track. The track was named in honour of Sonia O'Sullivan in 2013, after the original running track was irreparably damaged by the flooding of the River Lee in November 2009. The surface reached the end of its lifespan in 2024 and the track was closed to facilitate a complete resurfacing.

=== GAA pitch ===
The GAA pitch is home to UCC GAA teams across all four codes: Gaelic football, hurling, Ladies football and camogie, as well as Aussie Rules men's and women's teams.

=== Prunty pitch ===
A natural grass playing field, the Prunty pitch has been the home of UCC Sport since 1911. The venue has hosted UCC Rugby matches in the AIL League and is also home to UCC Soccer in the FAI CUFL leagues. The ground features floodlights and can accommodate over 800 spectators in the covered stands.

=== Synthetic pitch ===
Enclosed by the athletics track is the Mardyke's synthetic artificial turf pitch which is used for both hockey and soccer. The water-based pitch is floodlit and is used by the UCC Hockey club.

== Sources ==
- Mulqueen, Charles (2015). Where miracles happen : the story of Thomond Park. Wilton, Cork: Collins Press. ISBN 978-1-84889-255-2.
- O'Callaghan, Liam (31 July 2019) [2011]. Rugby in Munster: A Social and Cultural History. Cork University Press. ISBN 978-1-78205-364-4.
- Murphy, John A. (2011). Where Finbarr played : a concise illustrated history of sport in University College Cork, 1911-2011. University College Cork: Office of the Vice President for the Student Experience. ISBN 978-1906642372.
