= Glenmalure Park =

Former stadium in Dublin

Coordinates: 53°18′52.22″N 6°14′50.76″W

- Milltown
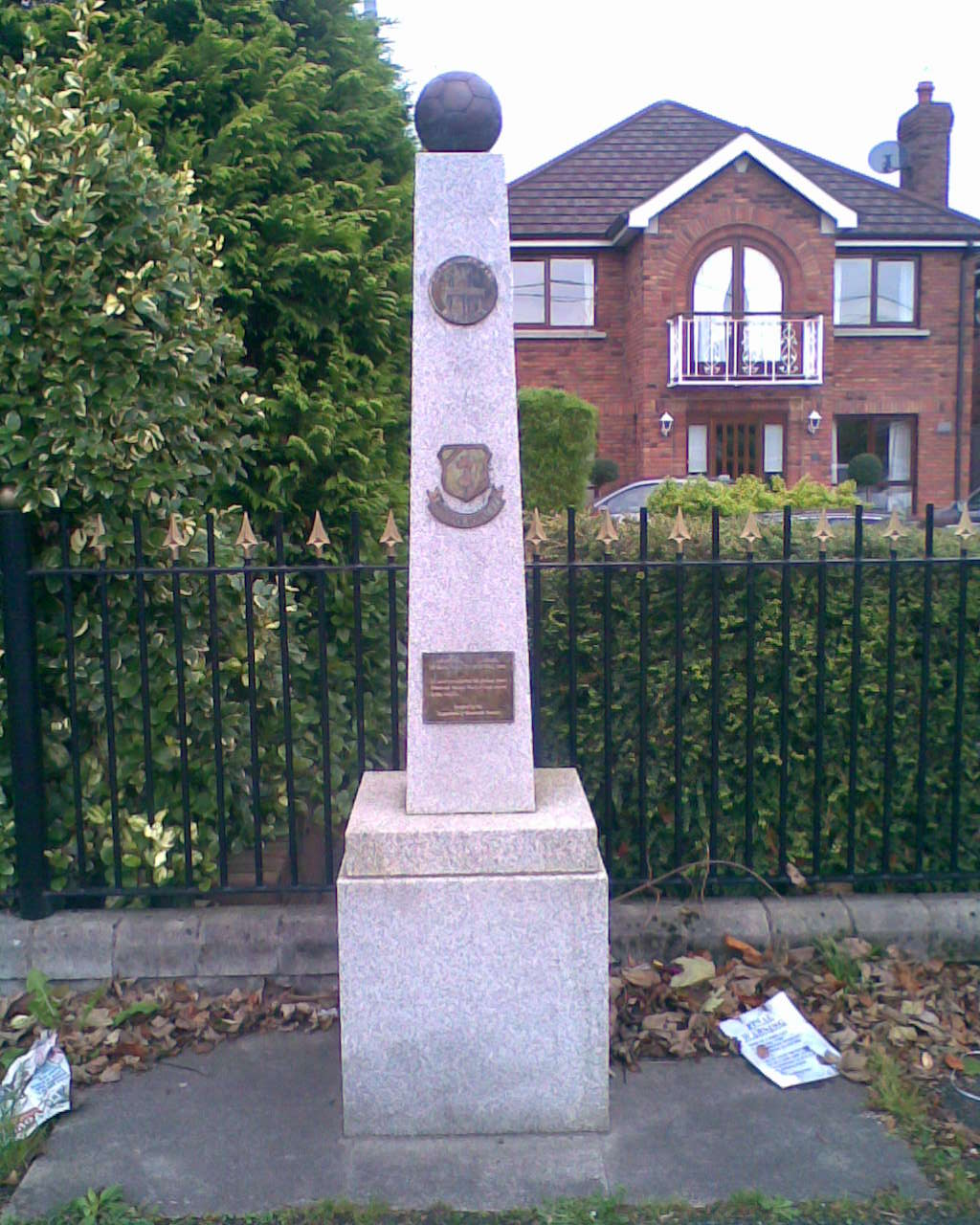
- Location: Milltown Road, Milltown, Dublin 6, Ireland
- Owner: Jesuit Order, Kilcoyne family
- Operator: Shamrock Rovers F.C.
- Capacity: c.20,000
- Surface: Grass

Construction
- Built: 1926
- Opened: 1926
- Closed: 12 April 1987
- Demolished: 1990

Tenants
- Shamrock Rovers F.C. (1926–1987)The FAI Cup match v Sligo Rovers was the last competitive match in Glanmalure Park, but the actual final match was a charity match on the following Wednesday

Glenmalure Park, often simply known as Milltown, was a football stadium on the Southside of Dublin city in Ireland. Located in the suburb of Milltown, it was home to Shamrock Rovers from 1926 to 1987, when it was sold to property developers by the club's directors. It is now a housing estate called Glenmalure Square.

== Ringsend to Milltown ==
Shamrock Rovers moved from the inner city area of Ringsend in the early 20th century to the then semi-rural suburb of Milltown. In Milltown, Rovers secured a long-term lease of land from the Jesuit Order, who were based in the area. The club's ground there was largely built by their supporters, who constructed the main stand and banked the areas on the other three sides. It was officially opened on Sunday 19 September 1926, with a friendly game against Belfast Celtic in front of a crowd of 18,000. Bob Fullam had the honour of scoring Rovers first ever goal at the ground.

== Development ==
When the Cunningham family took over the club in the 1930s, the stadium was named Glenmalure Park in honour of the Cunningham's ancestral home in the Glenmalure valley in the Wicklow Mountains. By the mid 1930s a social club was in operation with billiards, cards, croquet and tennis taking place. The Cunninghams completed the ground by terracing the remainder of the ground and erecting a roof over the terrace opposite the main stand. Glenmalure Park remained almost unaltered from then until its demolition in 1990, apart from the demolition of a small area of terracing beside the main stand and the erection of floodlights in the early 1980s. The capacity of the stadium was about 20,000 (with around 1000 seats) for most of its existence, its record crowd being 28,000 people for a game against Waterford in 1968. However, bigger crowds than this were sometimes seen at the venue before this, but went unreported by the club's owners. However, with modern safety precautions its capacity would probably have been considerably less. The ground's last full house came in 1986, when 18,000 attended a European Cup match against Glasgow Celtic. Temporary stands had to be erected for this game.

In 1978, Glenmalure Park hosted its first European game when Apoel Nicosia were defeated 2–0. In all seven European games were played there as well as 1988 Summer Olympics qualifiers.

== Sale and demolition ==
In 1987, the Kilcoyne family, who owned Shamrock Rovers since 1972 and had recently bought Glenmalure Park from the Jesuits, decided to sell the stadium to property developers. They stated that their aim was to move Rovers to Tolka Park to share with Home Farm F.C. The last match at Milltown was an FAI Cup semi-final between Shamrock Rovers and Sligo Rovers on Sunday 12 April 1987, attended by some 6,000 people. This game saw a pitch invasion and protest by fans objecting to the sale of the ground. Some Shamrock Rovers supporters occupied the pitch at half-time were joined by Sligo fans in solidarity. They had to be persuaded to leave the pitch before the game could restart.

The following season Shamrock Rovers fans formed an organisation called 'Keep Rovers at Milltown' (KRAM) and placed a picket on home games at Tolka Park, effectively bankrupting the club's owners. KRAM collected money to purchase Glenmalure Park but could not match the offer of a property developer to whom the Kilcoynes eventually sold the site. After a lengthy appeals process, Glenmalure Park was demolished in the summer of 1990 and an apartment complex was built there. It is now marked by a permanent memorial erected by Shamrock Rovers supporters on Thursday 21 May 1998.

On Thursday 12 April 2007 a ceremony was held at the monument to commemorate 20 years since the last competitive game was played at the famous old ground.

The sale of Glenmalure Park featured in the RTÉ programme "Twenty Moments That Shook Irish Sport" which was broadcast in August 2007. The feature came in for some criticism on the basis of its factual correctness and bias in favour of the Kilcoynes. The last game at Milltown was featured on RTÉ's Monday Night Soccer show on 14 April 2008.

Shamrock Rovers were without a home ground for over 20 years after the sale of Glenmalure Park, until the opening of Tallaght Stadium in March 2009.

Shamrock Rovers F.C. and the Shamrock Rovers Heritage Trust marked the 25th anniversary of the last game at Glenmalure Park in Milltown with a Stadium to Stadium Walk in April 2012 .

== Other uses ==
Four other League of Ireland clubs played home matches at Glenmalure Park – Shelbourne United in the 1923–24 season, Reds United in the 1935–36 season, Shelbourne from 1949 to 1951, and St Patrick's Athletic from 1951 to 1954.

Milltown also regularly hosted the Republic of Ireland women's national football team and the last match at the venue was a 4-1 win over Wales on the 24th of May 1987.

Billy Morton of Clonliffe Harriers staged his first athletics meeting on Saturday 14 August 1943 at Glenmalure Park.

The ground also hosted a boxing event in August 1966

== Sources ==
- The Hoops by Paul Doolan and Robert Goggins (ISBN 0-7171-2121-6)
- Irish Football Handbook by Dave Galvin & Gerry Desmond (ISBN 0-9517987-3-1)
- Clonliffe Harriers Athletic Club, 1886-2013 by Dominic Branigan (ISBN 9781782373698)
- Soccer and Society in Dublin: A History of Association Football in Ireland’s Capital by Conor Curran (ISBN 9781801510394)
