= List of Shamrock Rovers F.C. managers =

Shamrock Rovers Football Club is a football club from Dublin, Ireland. They compete in the Premier Division of the League of Ireland. They are the most successful club in the history of Irish football, having won 16 League of Ireland titles and 24 FAI Cups. They have also won the League of Ireland Shield on 18 occasions and the League of Ireland Cup once. This chronological list comprises all those who have held the position of manager or coach at Shamrock Rovers since the club first delegated control of the senior team to a single person, rather than a selection committee. Interim managers are included, where known, as well as those who have been in permanent charge. Each manager's entry includes his dates of tenure and the team's overall competitive record, in terms of matches won, drawn and lost, while under his management.

== List of managers ==
Updated 1 January 2012.

Name	Nat.	From	To	P	W	D	L	GS	GA	%W
Jimmy Dunne	Ireland	1937	1942	(n/a)	(n/a)	(n/a)	(n/a)	(n/a)	(n/a)	(n/a)
Bob Fullam	Ireland	1942	1945	(n/a)	(n/a)	(n/a)	(n/a)	(n/a)	(n/a)	(n/a)
Jimmy Dunne	Ireland	1947	1949	(n/a)	(n/a)	(n/a)	(n/a)	(n/a)	(n/a)	(n/a)
Paddy Coad	Ireland	1949	1960	(n/a)	(n/a)	(n/a)	(n/a)	(n/a)	(n/a)	(n/a)
Albie Murphy	Ireland	1960	1961	(n/a)	(n/a)	(n/a)	(n/a)	(n/a)	(n/a)	(n/a)
Seán Thomas	Ireland	1961	1964	(n/a)	(n/a)	(n/a)	(n/a)	(n/a)	(n/a)	(n/a)
Liam Tuohy	Ireland	1964	1969	(n/a)	(n/a)	(n/a)	(n/a)	(n/a)	(n/a)	(n/a)
Arthur Fitzsimons	Ireland	1969	1969	(n/a)	(n/a)	(n/a)	(n/a)	(n/a)	(n/a)	(n/a)
Frank O'Neill	Ireland	1969	1971	(n/a)	(n/a)	(n/a)	(n/a)	(n/a)	(n/a)	(n/a)
Billy Young	Ireland	1971	1971	(n/a)	(n/a)	(n/a)	(n/a)	(n/a)	(n/a)	(n/a)
Paddy Ambrose^{(int.)}	Ireland	1971	1972	(n/a)	(n/a)	(n/a)	(n/a)	(n/a)	(n/a)	(n/a)
Liam Tuohy	Ireland	1972	1973	(n/a)	(n/a)	(n/a)	(n/a)	(n/a)	(n/a)	(n/a)
Shay Keogh; Dougie Wood^{(int.)}	Ireland; Scotland	1973	1974	(n/a)	(n/a)	(n/a)	(n/a)	(n/a)	(n/a)	(n/a)
Mick Meagan	Ireland	1974	1976	(n/a)	(n/a)	(n/a)	(n/a)	(n/a)	(n/a)	(n/a)
Seán Thomas	Ireland	1976	1977	(n/a)	(n/a)	(n/a)	(n/a)	(n/a)	(n/a)	(n/a)
John Giles	Ireland	1977	1983	(n/a)	(n/a)	(n/a)	(n/a)	(n/a)	(n/a)	(n/a)
Noel Campbell	Ireland	1983	1983	(n/a)	(n/a)	(n/a)	(n/a)	(n/a)	(n/a)	(n/a)
Jim McLaughlin	Northern Ireland	1983	1986	(n/a)	(n/a)	(n/a)	(n/a)	(n/a)	(n/a)	(n/a)
Dermot Keely	Ireland	1986	1988	(n/a)	(n/a)	(n/a)	(n/a)	(n/a)	(n/a)	(n/a)
Noel King	Ireland	1988	1992	(n/a)	(n/a)	(n/a)	(n/a)	(n/a)	(n/a)	(n/a)
Ray Treacy	Ireland	1992	1996	(n/a)	(n/a)	(n/a)	(n/a)	(n/a)	(n/a)	(n/a)
Alan O'Neill; Terry Eviston	Ireland; Ireland	1996	1996	(n/a)	(n/a)	(n/a)	(n/a)	(n/a)	(n/a)	(n/a)
Pat Byrne	Ireland	1996	1997	(n/a)	(n/a)	(n/a)	(n/a)	(n/a)	(n/a)	(n/a)
Mick Byrne	Ireland	1997	1999	(n/a)	(n/a)	(n/a)	(n/a)	(n/a)	(n/a)	(n/a)
Damien Richardson	Ireland	1999	2002	(n/a)	(n/a)	(n/a)	(n/a)	(n/a)	(n/a)	(n/a)
Liam Buckley	Ireland	2002	2004	(n/a)	(n/a)	(n/a)	(n/a)	(n/a)	(n/a)	(n/a)
Noel Synnott^{(int.)}	Ireland	2004	2004	(n/a)	(n/a)	(n/a)	(n/a)	(n/a)	(n/a)	(n/a)
Roddy Collins	Ireland	1 Jan 2005	31 Dec 2005	(n/a)	(n/a)	(n/a)	(n/a)	(n/a)	(n/a)	(n/a)
Alan O'Neill^{(int.)}	Ireland	2005	2005	(n/a)	(n/a)	(n/a)	(n/a)	(n/a)	(n/a)	(n/a)
Pat Scully	Ireland	1 Jan 2006	1 Feb 2009	(n/a)	(n/a)	(n/a)	(n/a)	(n/a)	(n/a)	(n/a)
Jim Crawford^{(int.)}	Ireland	17 Oct 2008	14 Dec 2008	4	0	1	3	3	8	0.00
Michael O'Neill	Northern Ireland	15 Dec 2008	31 Dec 2011	95	52	25	18	148	84	54.74
Stephen Kenny	Ireland	1 Jan 2012	Sept 11, 2012	37	19	6	12			51.35
Stephen Glass^{(int.)}	Scotland	Sept 11, 2012	6 Nov 2012							
Trevor Croly	Ireland	7 Nov 2012	2 Aug 2014							
Pat Fenlon	Ireland	7 Nov 2014	3 Jul 2016							
Stephen Bradley	Ireland	6 Jul, 2016								

- Notes:

P – Total of played matches W – Won matches D – Drawn matches L – Lost matches GS – Goals scored GA – Goals against
%W – Percentage of matches won (rounded to 2 decimal places)

- Legend:

^{(int.)} Managers on interim charge.
