= 1983 FA Cup final =

Association football championship match

1983 FA Cup Final
- Event: 1982–83 FA Cup
Brighton & Hove Albion	Manchester United
- Manchester United won after a replay

Final
Brighton & Hove Albion	Manchester United
2	2
- After extra time
- Date: 21 May 1983
- Venue: Wembley Stadium, London
- Referee: Alf Grey (Norfolk)
- Attendance: 99,059

Replay
Brighton & Hove Albion	Manchester United
0	4
- Date: 26 May 1983
- Venue: Wembley Stadium, London
- Referee: Alf Grey (Norfolk)
- Attendance: 91,534

The 1983 FA Cup final was contested by Manchester United and Brighton & Hove Albion at Wembley Stadium.

Manchester United were the favourites, as Brighton had been relegated from the First Division that season, and had never reached a cup final before. United had finished third in the league that season and already had four FA Cup victories to their name.

The final ended in a 2–2 draw, forcing a replay at Wembley five days later, which Manchester United won 4–0. It was the third successive year that the FA Cup Final required a replay.

== The first match ==
The build-up to the first game included Brighton travelling to Wembley stadium by helicopter instead of using the traditional route of a team coach. Steve Foster, Brighton's captain was suspended for the match having received a booking in a league match against Notts County. Despite Manchester United being strong favourites to win the game, Brighton took an early lead through Gordon Smith, who would become notable late into extra-time. Frank Stapleton equalised and Ray Wilkins with a curling shot put Manchester United into the lead. Gary Stevens scored a late equaliser for Brighton which took the game into extra time.

The first game has since become infamous for the radio commentary line by Peter Jones "...and Smith must score" talking about a shot by Gordon Smith, which was then saved by the Manchester United goalkeeper Gary Bailey; the quote was subsequently used as a title for a Brighton fanzine. The final whistle went moments later with the final score 2–2 after extra time. Bailey's save had forced a replay and prevented Brighton from winning the first major trophy in their history.

== The replay ==
The second game, on a Thursday night, started the same way as the first game had, with Brighton taking the game to Manchester United. Although their chances were limited to long-range drives from Jimmy Case, United goalkeeper Gary Bailey had a couple of important saves to make. This all changed on 25 minutes, with United's first real attack. Alan Davies, who had made his FA Cup debut in the first game, set up captain Bryan Robson for a left-footed drive past Moseley into the corner of the net. Suddenly the atmosphere changed and it was the Manchester United fans who were singing loudest. This was compounded in the 30th minute, when United went 2–0 up, giving the team a two-goal cushion for the first time over the two matches. Brighton failed to clear a corner, and Davies crossed for Norman Whiteside to score with a header, making the 18 year old the youngest player to ever score in an FA Cup final as per 2024. This capped an incredible 12 months for the teenager, who had played in the 1982 FIFA World Cup for Northern Ireland, and scored in the League Cup final defeat to Liverpool earlier that year.

Brighton were rocked but continued to press, yet went further behind just before half time. Gordon McQueen headed on a free-kick and the ball fell to Robson to tap in at the far post, for his second goal of the game. The scoring was completed in the second half when the Dutch midfielder Arnold Mühren scored a penalty after Robson had been brought down by Stevens in the penalty area. It was the third consecutive year that a penalty had been awarded (and scored) in the Cup Final replay.

This was the first of three times that Bryan Robson captained Manchester United to FA Cup glory; he also achieved the feat in 1985 and 1990.

== Match details ==
21 May 1983

Brighton & Hove Albion	2–2 (a.e.t.)	Manchester United
Smith 14'; Stevens 87'	Report	Stapleton 55'; Wilkins 72'

Wembley Stadium, London
Attendance: 99,059
Referee: Alf Grey (Great Yarmouth)

Brighton & Hove Albion	Manchester United

GK	1	(England) Graham Moseley
RB	2	(England) Chris Ramsey
CB	6	(England) Gary Stevens
CB	5	(England) Steve Gatting
LB	3	(England) Graham Pearce
RM	11	(England) Neil Smillie
CM	4	(Republic of Ireland) Tony Grealish (c)
CM	7	(England) Jimmy Case
LM	8	(Republic of Ireland) Gary Howlett
CF	9	(Republic of Ireland) Michael Robinson
CF	10	(Scotland) Gordon Smith
Substitute:
MF	12	(Republic of Ireland) Gerry Ryan
Manager:
(England) Jimmy Melia

GK	1	(England) Gary Bailey
RB	2	(England) Mike Duxbury
CB	5	(Republic of Ireland) Kevin Moran
CB	6	(Scotland) Gordon McQueen
LB	3	(Scotland) Arthur Albiston
RM	11	(Wales) Alan Davies
CM	4	(England) Ray Wilkins
CM	7	(England) Bryan Robson (c)
LM	8	(Netherlands) Arnold Mühren
CF	9	(Republic of Ireland) Frank Stapleton
CF	10	(Northern Ireland) Norman Whiteside
Substitute:
MF	12	(Republic of Ireland) Ashley Grimes
Manager:
(England) Ron Atkinson

Assistant referees:
Colin Downey (Hounslow)
John Pardoe (Kidderminster)
Reserve official:
John Connock (Bristol)

Match rules

- 90 minutes
- 30 minutes of extra-time if necessary
- Replay if scores still level
- One named substitute
- Maximum of one substitution

== Replay match details ==
26 May 1983

Brighton & Hove Albion	0–4	Manchester United
		Robson 25', 44'; Whiteside 30'; Mühren 62' (pen.)

Wembley Stadium, London
Attendance: 91,534
Referee: Alf Grey (Norfolk)

Brighton & Hove Albion	Manchester United

GK	1	(England) Graham Moseley
RB	2	(England) Steve Gatting
CB	6	(England) Gary Stevens
CB	5	(England) Steve Foster (c)
LB	3	(England) Graham Pearce
RM	11	(England) Neil Smillie
CM	4	(Republic of Ireland) Tony Grealish
CM	7	(England) Jimmy Case
LM	8	(Republic of Ireland) Gary Howlett
CF	9	(Republic of Ireland) Michael Robinson
CF	10	(Scotland) Gordon Smith
Substitute:
MF	12	(Republic of Ireland) Gerry Ryan
Manager:
(England) Jimmy Melia

GK	1	(England) Gary Bailey
RB	2	(England) Mike Duxbury
CB	5	(Republic of Ireland) Kevin Moran
CB	6	(Scotland) Gordon McQueen
LB	3	(Scotland) Arthur Albiston
RM	11	(Wales) Alan Davies
CM	4	(England) Ray Wilkins
CM	7	(England) Bryan Robson (c)
LM	8	(Netherlands) Arnold Mühren
CF	9	(Republic of Ireland) Frank Stapleton
CF	10	(Northern Ireland) Norman Whiteside
Substitute:
MF	12	(Republic of Ireland) Ashley Grimes
Manager:
(England) Ron Atkinson

Match rules

- 90 minutes.
- 30 minutes of extra-time if necessary.
- Penalty shoot-out if scores still level.
- One named substitute.
- Maximum of one substitution.
