= Gerry Ryan (footballer) =

Irish footballer (1955–2023)

Personal information
- Full name: Gerard Joseph Ryan
- Date of birth: 4 October 1955
- Place of birth: Dublin, Ireland
- Date of death: 15 October 2023 (aged 68)
- Positions: Forward; winger

Senior career*
| Years | Team | Apps | (Gls) |
| 1975–1977 | Bohemians | 53 | (14) |
| 1977–1978 | Derby County | 30 | (4) |
| 1978–1985 | Brighton and Hove Albion | 173 | (32) |
| Total | | 226 | (50) |

International career
| 1985 | Republic of Ireland U21 | 1 | (0) |
| 1978–1984 | Republic of Ireland | 18 | (1) |

Managerial career
- 1993–1995: Brighton & Hove Albion (assistant)
- * Club domestic league appearances and goals

Gerard Joseph Ryan (4 October 1955 – 15 October 2023) was an Irish professional footballer who played as a forward or winger. He made 18 appearances for the Republic of Ireland national team scoring once.

== Career ==
Born in Dublin, Ryan began his career at Bohemians on 9 February 1975 and after 14 goals in 53 appearances he earned a move to Derby County in 1977. He was later moved to Brighton for £100,000 with whom he played in the 1983 FA Cup Final against Manchester United before his career was ended in 1985 after a broken leg sustained in a tackle from Crystal Palace's Henry Hughton.

Ryan played eighteen times for Ireland between 1978 and 1984. Ryan made his debut in April 1978, when he played in a 4–2 win against Turkey in a friendly at Lansdowne Road. His only goal for Ireland came over a year later at the same venue, but it was only a consolation effort as Ireland lost 3–1 to West Germany in a friendly. Ryan's last appearance in a green shirt came in 1984 when he played in a scoreless draw against Mexico at Dalymount Park. He earned one cap for the Republic of Ireland U21 side.

A testimonial in August 1986 provided the funds to buy an 18th-century old coaching house, The Witch Inn in Lindfield, West Sussex, which he ran. He turned out regularly for The Witch in the Lewes Sunday League.

== Personal life and death ==
His son Darragh also played for Brighton and in the League of Ireland.

Ryan was admitted to hospital on 18 August 2007 after suffering a stroke. Ryan's recovery from the stroke left him with a weakness in his left side and he decided to sell The Witch.

Gerry Ryan died on 15 October 2023, at the age of 68.

== Honours ==
Bohemians

- League of Ireland: 1974–75
- FAI Cup: 1976
- Leinster Senior Cup: 1974–75, 1975–76

Brighton & Hove Albion

- FA Cup runner-up: 1982–83

== Sources ==
- Dave Galvin; Gerry Desmond. Irish Football Handbook. ISBN 0-9517987-3-1.
