= Billy Newman =

Irish footballer (1946–2022)

Personal information
- Full name: William Newman
- Date of birth: 24 November 1946
- Place of birth: Dublin, Ireland
- Date of death: 12 October 2022 (aged 75)
- Place of death: Donegal, Ireland
- Position: Midfielder

Senior career*
Years	Team	Apps	(Gls)
1965–1966	Home Farm		
1966–1968	Bohemians		(12)
1968–1970	Shelbourne	19	(2)
1970–1972	Parkvilla		
1972–1974	Shelbourne	31	(7)
1981-1982	Shelbourne	1	(0)

International career
1969	Republic of Ireland	1	(0)
- * Club domestic league appearances and goals

William Newman (24 November 1946 – 12 October 2022) was an Irish footballer who played as a midfielder in the League of Ireland during the 1960s and 1970s.

Newman played for the amateur Bohemians alongside the likes of Billy Young and Tommy Kelly before turning professional and signing for Shelbourne.

While at Shelbourne, he made his solitary appearance for the Republic of Ireland national team on 27 May 1969 in a 2–0 defeat to Denmark in place of Johnny Giles. Newman was also briefly player-manager of Tonbridge in 1971, replacing fellow Irishman Joe Carolan in the role.

Newman died on 12 October 2022, at the age of 75.
