= Ritchie Bayly =

Irish footballer

Personal information
- Date of birth: 1 April 1962 (age 64)
- Place of birth: Dublin, Ireland
- Position: Midfielder

Senior career*
Years	Team	Apps	(Gls)
1978–1983	Shamrock Rovers		(3)
1983–1984	Drogheda United		(1)
1984–1986	Sligo Rovers	26	(3)
1986–1987	Bohemians	3	(0)
1990–1992	St James's Gate F.C.	26	(0)
1991–1992	Monaghan United	1	(0)
1992–1993	Kilkenny City	12	(1)

International career
1978–79	Republic of Ireland U21	4	(0)

Managerial career
- 1990–1992: St James's Gate F.C.
- * Club domestic league appearances and goals

Ritchie Bayly (born 1 April 1962) is an Irish former soccer player.

He made his debut for Shamrock Rovers on 22 October 1978.

He also played in a UEFA Cup Winners' Cup tie against Banik Ostrava at Milltown 1 November 1978. At sixteen years of age Ritchie became the youngest player ever to play for the Hoops in a European tie.

He controversially transferred to Drogheda United in February 1983.

He played with his brother Martin Bayly at Sligo and his nephew Robert Bayly currently plays for Shelbourne.

== Sources ==
- Paul Doolan; Robert Goggins. The Hoops. ISBN 0-7171-2121-6.
