= Robert Bayly =

Irish footballer (born 1988)

Personal information
- Full name: Robert Sean Bayly
- Date of birth: 22 February 1988 (age 38)
- Place of birth: Dublin, Ireland
- Height: 1.75 m (5 ft 9 in)
- Position: Midfielder

Youth career
- Cherry Orchard
- Leeds United

Senior career*
Years	Team	Apps	(Gls)
2006–2008	Leeds United	3	(0)
2009	Sporting Fingal	26	(3)
2010	Shamrock Rovers	30	(3)
2011	Bohemians	26	(0)
2012	Monaghan United	x	(x)
2012	Longford Town	11	(0)
2013	Shelbourne	20	(0)
2014	Shamrock Rovers	27	(1)
2015	Cliftonville	6	(1)
2015	Drogheda United	9	(0)
2016	Waterford United	2	(1)
2017	Shelbourne	2	(0)

International career
- Republic of Ireland U19
- * Club domestic league appearances and goals

Robert Sean Bayly (born 22 February 1988) is an Irish footballer.

His two uncles Ritchie Bayly and Martin Bayly had distinguished careers in the League of Ireland.

== Career ==
=== Leeds United ===
Capped at Ireland youth and Under-18 level while playing for Cherry Orchard, Bayly made his debut for Leeds United as a substitute in an English League Cup match against Southend United on 24 October 2006. On 26 October 2006, Bayly signed a professional two-year contract with Leeds. Bayly made his full debut in the final game of the 2006–07 Championship season away to Derby County. However, it was a debut to forget as he was shown a straight red card attempting to headbutt Craig Fagan. Bayly was released by Leeds early on during the 2008–2009 season despite featuring on a few occasions for Leeds during pre season. During his time in England he also played for the Republic of Ireland U19's.

=== Sporting Fingal ===
Bayly joined Sporting Fingal before the start of the 2009 League of Ireland First Division season. He made his League debut on the opening day of the 2009 season against Waterford United In an extraordinary season he scored the goal that clinched Sporting's promotion to the Premier Division against Bray Wanderers in a play-off and then six days later won his first senior medal winning the FAI Cup at Tallaght Stadium following Fingal's 2–1 victory over Sligo Rovers. Despite a successful season at Sporting Fingal, Bayly parted company with the club at the end of the season.

=== Shamrock Rovers ===
Bayly signed for Shamrock Rovers on 15 March 2010. He made his debut as a substitute the next day at Tallaght Stadium. He scored Rovers' equaliser in the UEFA Europa League tie against Bnei Yehuda Tel Aviv F.C. in the first European game at Tallaght Stadium. In total, Bayly scored three goals in 35 appearances for the Hoops.

=== Bohemians ===
In February 2011, Robert signed for Pat Fenlon's Bohemians just in time for the new season. "Boccer" made his debut for the Gypsies in a Setanta Sports Cup match against Portadown on 1 March but due to suspension would have to wait til the fourth league game of the season until he could make his league debut for the club. This came in a 1–0 defeat to Galway United at Dalymount Park. He scored his first goal for the club against Shelbourne on 25 April in an EA Sports Cup tie at Tolka Park.

Bayly left Bohemians in October 2011 after 26 league appearances for the club. His last appearance came against Shamrock Rovers on 5 October in a 1–1 draw.

=== Monaghan United ===
In December 2011, Robert signed for Roddy Collins' Monaghan United team. On 18 June 2012, the club announced their withdrawal from the League of Ireland and all of their playing staff were released by the club.

=== Longford Town ===
Robert joined Longford Town on 26 July 2012. He made his debut for the Midlands club the very next day in a 3–1 away win over SD Galway at Eamon Deacy Park. He was released at the end of the 2012 season.

=== Shelbourne ===
Bayly joined Shels in January 2013

=== Shamrock Rovers ===
Bayly re-joined Shamrock Rovers in 2014

=== Cliftonville ===
Bayly joined Cliftonville in January 2015 and was released in June 2015 after a number of poor performances with champions Cliftonville finishing 5th.

=== Return to League of Ireland ===
In July 2015, Bayly returned to the League of Ireland by joining Drogheda United.

=== Waterford United ===
In July 2016 he signed for former boss Roddy Collins at Waterford United. He made an impressive debut against Limerick in the RSC. He scored a long range stunner as they gave the runaway league leaders a very good game but a late flurry of Limerick goals saw them run out 5–1 winners.

== Personal life ==
Bayly was jailed in 2018 for smuggling cannabis.

== Honours ==
Cliftonville

- County Antrim Shield : 2015
- Northern Ireland Football League Cup : 2014–15

Shamrock Rovers

- League of Ireland (1): 2010

Sporting Fingal

- FAI Cup (1): 2009
