= Alan Davies (footballer) =

Welsh footballer

Personal information
- Full name: Alan Davies
- Date of birth: 5 December 1961
- Place of birth: Manchester, England
- Date of death: 4 February 1992 (aged 30)
- Place of death: Gower, Wales
- Height: 5 ft 8 in (1.73 m)
- Position: Winger

Youth career
- 1976–1978: Manchester United

Senior career*
| Years | Team | Apps | (Gls) |
| 1978–1985 | Manchester United | 7 | (0) |
| 1985–1987 | Newcastle United | 21 | (1) |
| 1986 | → Charlton Athletic (loan) | 1 | (0) |
| 1986 | → Carlisle United (loan) | 4 | (1) |
| 1987–1989 | Swansea City | 84 | (8) |
| 1989–1990 | Bradford City | 26 | (1) |
| 1990–1992 | Swansea City | 43 | (4) |
| Total | | 186 | (15) |

International career
| | Wales U21 | 6 | (0) |
| 1983–1990 | Wales | 13 | (0) |
- * Club domestic league appearances and goals

Alan Davies (5 December 1961 – 4 February 1992) was a Welsh international footballer who played as a right winger, although he could also play on the left. Davies began his football career with Manchester United, before spending time with Newcastle United, Charlton Athletic, Carlisle United, Swansea City (two spells) and Bradford City. Davies took his own life in February 1992.

== Career ==
=== Club career ===
Born in Manchester, Davies began his football career at Manchester United, turning professional in December 1978.

He made his senior debut for United on 1 May 1982, and made a total of 10 appearances for them, scoring one goal, in the first leg of their European Cup Winners' Cup semi-final against Juventus in April 1984. He made his final United appearance on 5 May 1984. He played in both games in the 1983 FA Cup Final when United defeated Brighton.

Davies then moved to Newcastle United and made 21 league appearances in his two seasons there, although he also had loan spells with Charlton Athletic and Carlisle United. He then transferred to Swansea City for the 1987–88 season.

Davies found much more success at Swansea, playing in 84 league matches in two seasons there, and scoring eight goals. He then transferred to Bradford City for a season in June 1989. After 26 league appearances and one goal for the Bantams, Davies returned to Swansea City, scoring a further four goals in 43 league appearances.

He died by suicide in 1992. A testimonial match in his memory was contested between Swansea City and Manchester United at the Vetch Field in August that year.

=== International career ===
Although he was born in England, Davies' parents were Welsh and he was therefore eligible to play for the Wales national football team. Davies won 13 caps for Wales in a seven-year international career.

== Death ==
On 4 February 1992, after dropping his daughter off at school, Davies drove to Horton, and took his own life by carbon monoxide poisoning.

At the inquest of fellow player Gary Speed, who was found hanged in November 2011, it was alleged that he and Speed had been "favourites" of convicted child-abuser Barry Bennell, though there was no suggestion they had been abused by Bennell.

== Honours ==
Manchester United

- FA Cup: 1982–83

Swansea City

- Football League Fourth Division play-offs: 1988

Individual

- PFA Team of the Year: 1987–88 Fourth Division
