= Gary Howlett =

Irish footballer

Personal information
- Full name: Gary Howlett
- Date of birth: April 2, 1963 (age 63)
- Place of birth: Republic of Ireland
- Position: Midfielder

Team information
- Current team: Killester United (manager)

Youth career
- Home Farm

Senior career*
Years	Team	Apps	(Gls)
- Coventry City
1980s–1984	Brighton & Hove Albion		
1984–1988	AFC Bournemouth		
1987	→ Aldershot (loan)		
1987–1988	→ Chester City (loan)		
1988–1991	York City		
1991–	Shelbourne		
- Crusaders

International career
1984	Republic of Ireland	1	(0)
	Republic of Ireland U21	4	(1)
- * Club domestic league appearances and goals

Gary Howlett (born 2 April 1963) is an Irish former international footballer and member of Brighton & Hove Albion's 1983 FA Cup final team. Howlett joined Brighton in the early 1980s from Coventry City. Before that he played for Home Farm. The highlight of his Brighton career came in the 1983 final against Manchester United, where he crossed for Gordon Smith to head the first goal in a match that ended 2–2. Manchester United won the replay 4–0.

He won one cap for the Republic of Ireland, against China in 1984. Howlett, whose playing career was hampered by injuries, later joined AFC Bournemouth (1984–88) and York City (1988–91), and played on loan for Aldershot (1987) and Chester City (1987–88).

Also scored once in four appearances for the Republic of Ireland U21 scoring once.

He later returned to Ireland to play for Shelbourne, making his League of Ireland debut on 1 March 1991. He later had a spell on the coaching staff with Bohemian FC under Stephen Kenny and Gareth Farrelly and was caretaker manager of the club between Kenny's departure and Farrelly's arrival. He later played in the Irish League for Crusaders.

Howlett currently manages Killester United in the Leinster Senior League.

== Honours ==
Brighton & Hove Albion

- FA Cup runner-up: 1982–83

Bournemouth

- Football League Third Division: 1986–87
