= Gary Stevens (footballer, born 1962) =

English footballer (born 1962)

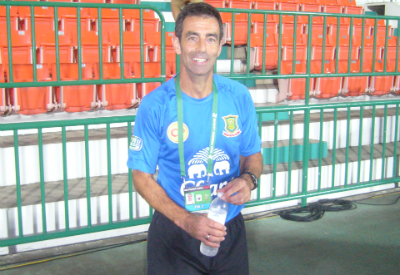

Personal information
- Full name: Gary Andrew Stevens
- Date of birth: 30 March 1962 (age 64)
- Place of birth: Hillingdon, England
- Height: 6 ft 0 in (1.83 m)
- Position: Defender

Youth career
- Ipswich Town
- 1977–1979: Brighton & Hove Albion

Senior career*
Years	Team	Apps	(Gls)
1979–1983	Brighton & Hove Albion	133	(2)
1983–1990	Tottenham Hotspur	147	(6)
1990–1992	Portsmouth	52	(3)
Total		332	(11)

International career
1983–1986	England U21	8	(0)
1984–1986	England	7	(0)

Managerial career
- 1992: Petersfield Town
- 2010–2011: Gabala (Assistant manager)
- 2013–2014: Sligo Rovers (Assistant manager)
- 2014–2015: Army United
- 2015: Port
- * Club domestic league appearances and goals

Gary Andrew Stevens (born 30 March 1962) is an English former footballer who played in the Football League for Brighton & Hove Albion, Tottenham Hotspur and Portsmouth. He won seven caps for England.

== Playing career ==
Stevens was born in Hillingdon, Middlesex, and attended Thurston Upper School in Suffolk. He joined Brighton & Hove Albion in 1977. Stevens made his debut as a 17-year-old on 15 September 1979, in the First Division as Brighton won 2–0 at home to Ipswich Town, the club which had released him as a schoolboy. A versatile defender who could also play in midfield, he made 26 appearances in his first season, scoring once, and remained a regular in the side.

In 1983, Brighton, already relegated to the Second Division, played in the FA Cup Final for the first time in their history. Losing to Manchester United 2–1 with three minutes of normal time remaining, Stevens equalised, and teammate Gordon Smith missed an easy chance to win the game at the end of extra time, remembered for the commentator's line "And Smith must score..." Brighton lost the replay 4–0, and Stevens joined Tottenham Hotspur for a fee of "about £350,000".

Stevens made his Tottenham debut at the start of the 1983–84 season, again against Ipswich, but this time was on the losing side. He was a first team regular that season, making 40 league appearances and scoring four goals, and played on the winning side in the 1984 UEFA Cup Final, scoring his penalty in the shootout against Anderlecht. He was also in the side that suffered an unlikely 3–2 defeat to Coventry City in the 1987 FA Cup Final.

He was also capped seven times by England, and was included in the squad for the 1986 World Cup squad – as, confusingly, was the unrelated Everton player Gary Stevens. He made two substitute appearances in the tournament. He also won eight caps for England under-21s.

Stevens left Spurs for Portsmouth in 1990 but persistent injuries forced him to retire in 1992. He had never fully recovered from a knee injury suffered in November 1988 when heavily tackled by Vinnie Jones. At the time of the challenge, Gary Stevens was contesting possession of the ball with John Fashanu near the touchline when Jones slid into him.

== Post-playing career ==
Following retirement Stevens worked as a presenter for Sky Sports, and for Talksport radio in the UK, although he has since left the station.

He also became manager of Wessex league side Petersfield Town in 1992–93 season but resigned six months later.

At the start of the 2010–11 Azerbaijan Premier League, Stevens joined Gabala as assistant to Tony Adams. Stevens stayed on as assistant after Adams left in November 2011, until April 2012 when he also left the club.

In January 2013 he became the assistant coach at Sligo Rovers.

Stevens works as a presenter on Astro SuperSport in Malaysia with former England teammate Steve McMahon.

== Honours ==
Brighton & Hove Albion

- FA Cup runner-up: 1982–83

Tottenham Hotspur

- UEFA Cup: 1983–84
- FA Cup runner-up: 1986–87

England U21

- UEFA European Under-21 Championship: 1984
