= Tommy Kelly (footballer) =

Irish footballer

Personal information
- Place of birth: Dublin, Republic of Ireland
- Position: Midfielder

Senior career*
Years	Team	Apps	(Gls)
1966–1967	Bohemians	?	(3)
1967–1968	Shamrock Rovers	8	(0)
1968	Boston Beacons	29	(0)
1968–1969	St Patrick's Athletic	12	(0)
1969–1982	Bohemians	575	(18)
- * Club domestic league appearances and goals

Tommy Kelly was an Irish soccer player during the 1960s, 1970s and 1980s.

== Career ==
A dynamic midfielder, his career at Dalymount Park spanned 3 different decades. He appeared in a club record 19 games in European competition and won 2 League of Ireland titles.

He joined Bohs in 1965/66 and played as a full back in the "B" team. He made his debut for the first team as a substitute in a 4–1 win over Drogheda on 10 April 1966. He began next season as left back until Bobby Wade returned from injury, whereby Kelly moved into the centre of midfield. It is here where he would remain for the majority of his career. He won the first of his 3 amateur international caps against Wales in October 1966. Bohs finished the 66/67 season as league runners-up and because of their strictly amateur status, they began to lose some of their key players to their professional rivals.

Kelly was among the defectors as he moved to Shamrock Rovers. However, he didn't stay long at Glenmalure Park, as he joined Seán Thomas in America midway through the 1967/68 season. He made one appearance in European competition in his time at Milltown.

In 1968 signed for the Boston Beacons, an embryonic soccer team in the North American Soccer League, Kelly racked up 29 appearances during his only season there.

Tommy signed for St Patrick's Athletic 2 months into the 1968/69 season.

Tommy would soon return to his spiritual home of Dalymount Park, signing again for the "Gypsies" in time for the 1969/70 season. Tommy won the man of the match as Bohs beat Sligo to win the 1970 FAI Cup Final. That cup victory meant that Bohs entered European competition for the first time and Kelly would go on to appear in 19 out of Bohs' first 20 games in Europe. More success followed and he was ever-present in Bohs' League winning campaign of 1974/75. He added another FAI Cup winners medal in 1976 and a 2nd league title was won in 1977/78. Kelly was still going strong as Bohs narrowly missed out on winning the title the following season. With his 39th birthday looming, Tommy hung his boots at the end of the 1981/82 season - his last match was the FAI Cup Final defeat by Limerick.

Tommy Kelly made 575 competitive appearances for Bohemians, scoring 31 goals. He also won League of Ireland XI Representative honours.
