= Noel Synnott =

Irish footballer and manager

Personal information
- Full name: Noel Stephen Synnott
- Date of birth: 14 December 1951 (age 74)
- Place of birth: Dublin, Ireland
- Position: Defender

Senior career*
Years	Team	Apps	(Gls)
1973–1974	Sligo Rovers	14	(2)
1974–1983	Shamrock Rovers	182	(4)
1985–1988	Waterford United	54	(0)

International career
1979	League of Ireland XI	1	(0)
1978	Republic of Ireland	3	(0)

Managerial career
- 1991–1992: Kilkenny City
- 2004: Shamrock Rovers
- * Club domestic league appearances and goals

Noel Synnott (born 14 December 1951) is an Irish former football player and manager.

He was a defender who played for Shamrock Rovers and played three times for the Republic of Ireland national football team in 1978.

He began in the League of Ireland in 1973 playing for Sligo Rovers. He joined Shamrock Rovers the following year firstly playing under Mick Meagan, then Sean Thomas and Johnny Giles. He played for nine years at Milltown, making four appearances in European competition and a League of Ireland XI cap, plus 3 appearances against Liverpool F.C. and also against Southampton and for Waterford against Arsenal, he also played for the League of Ireland against Argentina in April 1978, in the Boca Juniors stadium in Buenos Aires, just before Argentina won the World Cup in June of that year. On 27 March 1983, he was the victim of a crude tackle, which resulted in a broken leg. Doctors told him he would never play again so a testimonial was held for him at Glenmalure Park on 21 September 1983.

However, two years later, he made a comeback for Waterford United where he scored an own goal in the FAI Cup Final in 1986 against Rovers. As Rovers had won the League again, this final appearance had qualified the Blues for the UEFA Cup Winners' Cup where Noel scored against FC Girondins de Bordeaux in September 1986, and went on to finish as top goalscorer for Waterford United that season in European competition.

In August 1988, Synnott once again appeared for The Hoops in a Leinster Senior Cup tie.

After his playing career ended, he served as manager of Kilkenny City for the 1991–92 season and Shamrock Rovers for a brief period in 2004.

He now works as a taxi driver specialising in driving members of the popular Leeds United forum WACCOE.com to their desired destination. Noel has gone on to star in a number of television advertisements.

== Honours ==
- FAI Cup
  - Shamrock Rovers – 1978
- League of Ireland Cup
  - Shamrock Rovers – 1976/77
- Leinster Senior Cup (football)
  - Shamrock Rovers – 1982

== Sources ==
- Paul Doolan; Robert Goggins. The Hoops. ISBN 0-7171-2121-6.
