= Home Farm F.C. =

Irish association football club

Home Farm
- Full name: Home Farm Football Club
- Nickname: The Farm Boys
- Founded: 1928; 98 years ago
- Ground: Whitehall Stadium (1989–present); Tolka Park (1972–1989)
- Capacity: 1,800
- Owner: Trustees
- Chairman: Eamonn Mahon
- Manager: Gavin Peers
- League: FAI National League (2026–); Leinster Senior League (2000—)
- Website: homefarmfc.ie
Home colours	Away colours

Home Farm Football Club is an Irish association football club based in Whitehall, Dublin. Founded in 1928, the club was briefly known as Home Farm Drumcondra in 1972 after merging with League of Ireland side Drumcondra. Between 1995 and 1999 they played as Home Farm Everton until a split within the club led to the formation of Home Farm Fingal (later known as Dublin City) with the remaining members of Home Farm reverting to amateur status.

Despite winning the 1975 FAI Cup as an amateur team, Home Farm is best known for its youth system which has produced dozens of players who have gone on to play for clubs throughout Ireland and the United Kingdom. In addition many have also gone on to represent the Republic of Ireland at international level.

== History ==
=== Formation ===
In the mid-1920s, Leo Fitzmaurice – brother of Trans-Atlantic aviator James Fitzmaurice – organised a street football league for the Drumcondra and Whitehall areas of Northside Dublin. This league featured teams from the surrounding roads including Drumcondra Road, Ormonde Road, Hollybank Road, Richmond Road and Home Farm Road. In 1928, the latter two (led by Don Seery and Brendan Menton Snr respectively) merged to form Home Farm Football Club. Menton later became president of the Football Association of Ireland while Seery became Home Farm's first honorary treasurer and the father of Ronan Seery, who later founded Dublin City. The new club initially shared a field with a local butcher's cattle until the parish's canon gave them permission to use land on Griffith Avenue that had been earmarked for the construction of a new church. The club began playing their home games at Griffith Avenue in a kit of black and gold stripes, which were obtained at a jumble sale. By the following season, their colours were changed to blue and white hoops.

=== Early years (1930s to 1960s) ===
Home Farm established a reputation for developing youth players into senior international footballers. In 1936, when they won the Free State Minor Cup, the team included Johnny Carey. By 1937, former Home Farm players Paddy Farrell, Johnny Carey and Kevin O'Flanagan had all become Irish internationals with the FAI's Ireland team. Carey and O'Flanagan made their debuts in the same game against Norway on 7 November 1937, in a qualifier for the 1938 World Cup. O'Flanagan scored in what was a 3–3 draw. All three men were also capped for the IFA's Ireland team. Carey went on to captain Manchester United and was the first of several Home Farm graduates to establish themselves at the English club.

In 1953 Liam Whelan, one of the so-called 'Busby Babes' and among the victims of the Munich air disaster, made the same journey. Full-back Joe Carolan started playing football with Home Farm at youth level before moving to Manchester United on 15 February 1956, where he featured in their FA Youth Cup winning team. Carolan made his senior debut for United against Luton Town on 22 November 1958 and his Irish international debut against Sweden on 1 November 1959.

During the 1960s Home Farm produced 20 full internationals including, among others, Paddy Mulligan. The club's senior team also started to win cup competitions; they won the FAI Intermediate Cup on three occasions that decade — in 1963, 1967 and 1968 — and finished as runners-up in 1966 and 1970. In 1964 they also won the Leinster Senior Cup by beating Dundalk in the final. The club's youth teams continued to win trophies and in 1964–65, provided both finalists in the 1965 FAI Youth Cup. Meanwhile, Home Farm Under-14s, managed by coach Joe Fitzpatrick, earned a place in the Guinness Book of Records for their match winning sequence of 79 games between 1968 and 1971.

=== League of Ireland (1972–99) ===
Chart of yearly table positions for Home Farm in League of Ireland

In 1972 Home Farm and their trustees, Brendan Menton Sr. and Don Seery, were given a chance to field a senior team in the League of Ireland when they merged with Drumcondra. The Drums were £6,000 in debt and, having posted back-to-back finishes in last place for both 1969–70 and 1970–71, owner Sam Prole decided to sell the club to Home Farm. At the time, Drumcondra were a professional football club whereas Home Farm were an amateur outfit playing at junior level. As part of the deal, the club also gained Tolka Park as their home ground. Home Farm agreed to keep the Drums name alive by playing under the name Home Farm Drumcondra but, after just a year, they infuriated the Prole family by reverting to the name Home Farm.

Willie Phillips was appointed as the club's first League of Ireland manager. They finished third from bottom in their debut season, ahead of Limerick and Sligo Rovers. Phillips was replaced the following season by Scotsman John McSeveney. McSeveney resigned in his first season, leaving former Everton coach Tommy Eglinton to fill in until Dave Bacuzzi, who had coached at Eton College, was appointed in April 1974.

In 1975 Home Farm won the FAI Cup for the first time in the club's history. With a team managed by Dave Bacuzzi and including Noel King, James Higgins, Martin Murray and Dermot Keely, they beat Dundalk, Cork Celtic and St Patrick's Athletic in earlier rounds before defeating Shelbourne 1–0 in the final at Dalymount Park. As a result, they became the first amateur team to win the FAI Cup in forty years. The following season they competed in the European Cup Winners Cup, playing against French side, RC Lens. They drew 1–1 at home but lost the away leg 6–0.

Despite this cup success, their performances in the League of Ireland were poor and between 1972 and 1987, when they were relegated to the League of Ireland First Division, they never finished higher than ninth. The club, however, continued to produce players like Ronnie Whelan. During the 1980s, Whelan became an established player at Liverpool and was a key member of the Republic of Ireland team under Jack Charlton.

During the 1990s, the club's youth team set another Guinness World Record when they went unbeaten for five years. Featuring future Irish internationals Graham Kavanagh and Gary Kelly, the squad — managed by Paddy Hilliard — played a total of 203 games without defeat.

=== Home Farm Everton (1995–99) ===
In 1995, Home Farm linked up with Everton in a sponsorship deal which resulted in the club becoming known as 'Home Farm Everton'. As part of the deal, Everton got first choice of the best Home Farm players and in 1996 they signed Richard Dunne. At the end of the 1995–96 season, Home Farm Everton finished third in the First Division and then beat Athlone Town in a promotion/relegation play-off to return to the League of Ireland Premier Division. During the subsequent season Steve Archibald briefly played for the club. However, after a poor performance against Derry City, Archibald was allegedly told to "eff off home" by then manager Dermot Keely. After just one season back in the top division, they were relegated. Keely subsequently guided the club to success in the League of Ireland First Division Shield in 1998. The club continued to play as Home Farm Everton until 1999 when the sponsorship agreement ended.

=== Split ===
Old Home Farm F.C. crest

After the end of the sponsorship deal with Everton, Home Farm decided to abandon their League of Ireland ambitions in 1999. However, Ronan Seery — the club's chief executive officer — persuaded the club to sell their franchise to him. The Home Farm members who wished to concentrate on the club's schoolboy academy, instead returned to amateur football. This effectively resulted in a split within the club. Seery subsequently formed a new professional team, Home Farm Fingal. Fingal is an old name for an area corresponding approximately with Northside Dublin. They took Home Farm Everton's place for the 1999–2000 season before changing their name to Dublin City in 2001. Meanwhile, the amateur and youth sections of the club began playing once again as Home Farm F.C. and their senior team entered the Leinster Senior League.

==== Aftermath of the split ====
Despite the split in Home Farm's senior team, the club continued to perform strongly at underage level where they played in the Dublin and District Schoolboy League. Under Gerry Garvan, their youth team went unbeaten for three years between 1999 and 2002. During this period, the under-14 team won the Schoolboys FAI Goodson Cup twice. In 2002, Garvan's team travelled to Glasgow, where they beat a Celtic youth team 2–0, with Darren O'Dea scoring twice. Four of the Home Farm youth squad – O'Dea, Diarmuid O'Carroll, Gary Walsh and Gareth Christie – were already being tracked by Celtic youth development officer Tommy Burns and all four were subsequently offered contracts by the Scottish club. Three more squad members joined Ipswich Town – with goalkeeper Shane Supple, defender Michael Synnott and midfielder Owen Garvan signing for the English club – while another member of the team, Chris McCann, signed for Burnley.

=== Modern era ===
In February 2009, Home Farm agreed a three-year deal with Portsmouth F.C. for the English club to fund Home Farm's youth development system. In return, Home Farm's players would be offered to join Pompey's academy. In July of the same year, Carl Walshe and Chinedu Vine joined Portsmouth as first year scholars.

The club merged with Clontarf club Belgrove F.C. and entered the 2014 FAI Cup competing as Belgrove/Home Farm F.C.

In December 2025, Home Farm were one of 15 clubs accepted into the FAI National League, a new step in the Republic of Ireland football league pyramid, due to begin in Autumn 2026. On 26 July 2026, the club announced Gavin Peers as their manager for the first National League season.

== Current Squad ==
As of 8 October 2026

Note: Flags indicate national team as defined under FIFA eligibility rules; some limited exceptions apply. Players may hold more than one non-FIFA nationality.

No.	Pos.	Nation	Player
1	GK	IRL	Dáithí Folan
2	DF	IRL	Michael Keyes
3	DF	IRL	Callum Ralph
4	MF	IRL	Aaron Walsh
5	DF	IRL	Evan Haddock
6	MF	UKR	Viktor Serdenyuk
7	FW	IRL	Alan Leonard
9	MF	IRL	Jamal Ibrahim
10	MF	IRL	Harry O'Connor
11	MF	IRL	Owen Benson
12	DF	IRL	Ethan Maher
13	GK	IRL	Lee Doyle
14	DF	NIR	Josh Doyle

No.	Pos.	Nation	Player
15	DF	IRL	Abdul-Muniz Dele
16	MF	IRL	Shane Forbes
17	DF	IRL	Davin O'Connor
18	MF	IRL	Alex Bailey
19	MF	IRL	Romeo Tuyusige
21	FW	IRL	Patrick Abako
22	FW	IRL	Rob Manley
23	DF	IRL	Jared Penrose
24	DF	IRL	Sam Hayden
25	MF	IRL	Sifaks Mellah
—	GK	IRL	Rocco Byrne
—	DF	IRL	Bradley Peers

== Grounds ==
Home Farm play their home matches at Whitehall Stadium. After leaving Tolka Park in 1989, Home Farm moved up the road to Whitehall Stadium, which had previously been the club's underage venue.

=== 1972–1989: Tolka Park ===
Tolka Park became the main ground of Home Farm when the club merged with Drumcondra F.C., the former tenants, at the end of the 1971–72 League of Ireland season. The club, known as Home Farm-Drumcondra during their first season at Tolka Park, used the stadium as their home ground from 1972 to 1989. Home Farm shared the ground with Shamrock Rovers for the 1987–88 season and, in the summer of 1989, moved to the nearby Whitehall Stadium while Shelbourne F.C. took over the lease on Tolka Park.

== Sponsorship deals ==
=== Leeds United ===
In January 2000 Home Farm announced an arrangement with Leeds United. At the time United featured several graduates of the Home Farm academy in their squad, most notably Gary Kelly, Ian Harte, Stephen McPhail and Alan Maybury. Under the arrangement, Leeds provided technical support to the Home Farm coaching team, led by Liam Tuohy and Home Farm featured the Leeds crest on their shirts. Another player who was on the books of both clubs as a junior goalkeeper was Nicky Byrne, later to find success as a singer with Westlife.

=== Renault ===
In February 2005, Home Farm unveiled a €1 million sponsorship deal with several groups, including Renault Ireland.

The aim of the investment was to establish the club as a major football academy. It was planned for the money to be invested in the club over the following three years. The Irish Department of Sports, Arts and Tourism, the Irish Youth Foundation and the club president, Tony O'Reilly also contributed to the fund.

O'Reilly and Renault Ireland chairman Bill Cullen, who was involved in the deal, are former Home Farm players. As part of the arrangement, Home Farm jerseys featured the Renault logo alongside the club's crest.

== Notable former players ==
Dual Ireland internationals

- (Republic of Ireland) (Ireland) Johnny Carey
- (Republic of Ireland) (Ireland) Paddy Farrell
- (Republic of Ireland) (Ireland) Kevin O'Flanagan

Republic of Ireland internationals

- (Republic of Ireland) Eddie Bailham
- (Republic of Ireland) Ray Brady
- (Republic of Ireland) Joe Carolan
- (Republic of Ireland) Terry Conroy
- (Republic of Ireland) Kenny Cunningham
- (Republic of Ireland) Ken DeMange
- (Republic of Ireland) Richard Dunne
- (Republic of Ireland) Peter Eccles
- (Republic of Ireland) Gareth Farrelly
- (Republic of Ireland) Theo Foley
- (Republic of Ireland) Johnny Fullam
- (Republic of Ireland) Alan Gaffney
- (Republic of Ireland) Shay Gibbons
- (Republic of Ireland) Johnny Giles
- (Republic of Ireland) Tommy Godwin
- (Republic of Ireland) Joe Haverty
- (Republic of Ireland) Gary Howlett
- (Republic of Ireland) Graham Kavanagh
- (Republic of Ireland) Gary Kelly
- (Republic of Ireland) Mark Kennedy
- (Republic of Ireland) Mark Kinsella
- (Republic of Ireland) Mick Lawlor
- (Republic of Ireland) Robin Lawler
- (Republic of Ireland) Tony Macken
- (Republic of Ireland) Mick Martin
- (Republic of Ireland) Alan Maybury
- (Republic of Ireland) Mick McGrath
- (Republic of Ireland) Stephen McPhail
- (Republic of Ireland) Jackie Mooney
- (Republic of Ireland) Paddy Mulligan
- (Republic of Ireland) Billy Newman
- (Republic of Ireland) Matt Doherty
- (Republic of Ireland) Mick O'Flanagan
- (Republic of Ireland) Darren O'Dea
- (Republic of Ireland) Frank O'Neill
- (Republic of Ireland) John Thompson
- (Republic of Ireland) Ray Treacy
- (Republic of Ireland) Stephen Ward
- (Republic of Ireland) Liam Whelan
- (Republic of Ireland) Ronnie Whelan
- (Republic of Ireland) Ronnie Whelan Snr.

Republic of Ireland under-21 internationals

- (Republic of Ireland) Vinny Arkins
- (Republic of Ireland) Martin Bayly
- (Republic of Ireland) Chris Fagan
- (Republic of Ireland) Barry Ferguson
- (Republic of Ireland) Owen Garvan
- (Republic of Ireland) Dave Henderson
- (Republic of Ireland) Ian Lawlor
- (Republic of Ireland) Stephen Maher
- (Republic of Ireland) Chris McCann
- (Republic of Ireland) Brian Mooney
- (Republic of Ireland) Diarmuid O'Carroll
- (Republic of Ireland) David O'Gorman
- (Republic of Ireland) Shane Supple

League of Ireland XI players

- (Republic of Ireland) Vinny Arkins
- (Republic of Ireland) Martin Bayly
- (Republic of Ireland) Damien Byrne
- (Republic of Ireland) Terry Eviston
- (Republic of Ireland) Dave Henderson
- (Republic of Ireland) Paul Keegan
- (Republic of Ireland) Dermot Keely
- (Republic of Ireland) Ray Keogh
- (Republic of Ireland) Noel King
- (Republic of Ireland) John McDonnell
- (Republic of Ireland) Brian Mooney
- (Republic of Ireland) Mick Neville

Ireland national rugby union team internationals

- (Republic of Ireland) Kevin O'Flanagan
- (Republic of Ireland) Mick O'Flanagan
- (Republic of Ireland) Tony O'Reilly

Other internationals

- (Scotland) Steve Archibald
- (Gibraltar) Jamie Bosio

Managers

- (Republic of Ireland) Martin Bayly
- (Republic of Ireland) Johnny Carey
- (Republic of Ireland) Roddy Collins
- (Republic of Ireland) Tommy Dunne
- (Republic of Ireland) Terry Eviston
- (Republic of Ireland) Gareth Farrelly
- (Republic of Ireland) Johnny Giles
- (Republic of Ireland) Stephen Kenny
- (Republic of Ireland) Gary Howlett
- (Republic of Ireland) Graham Kavanagh
- (Republic of Ireland) Dermot Keely
- (Republic of Ireland) Noel King
- (Republic of Ireland) Mark Kinsella
- (Republic of Ireland) Mick Lawlor
- (Republic of Ireland) John McDonnell
- (Republic of Ireland) Fran Rooney
- (Republic of Ireland) Kevin Doherty

Celebrities

- (Republic of Ireland) Nicky Byrne − member of Westlife
- (Republic of Ireland) Bill Cullen – host of The Apprentice.

Sports officials

- (Republic of Ireland) Brendan Menton Snr – president of the Football Association of Ireland
- (Republic of Ireland) Kevin O'Flanagan – member of the International Olympic Committee

== Notable former coaches/managers ==
- (Republic of Ireland) Seán Thomas (1960–1961)
- (Scotland) John McSeveney (1973)
- (England) Tommy Eggleston (1973–1974)
- (England) Dave Bacuzzi (1974–1984)
- (Republic of Ireland) Ray Treacy (1982–1990)
- (Republic of Ireland) Mick Lawlor (1984–86)
- (Republic of Ireland) Martin Bayly (1994–1996)
- (Republic of Ireland) Dermot Keely (1996–1998)
- (Republic of Ireland) Liam Tuohy

== European record ==
Season	Competition	Round	Opponent	Home	Away	Aggregate
1975–76	European Cup Winners' Cup	1R	(France) Lens	1–1	0–6	1–7

== Honours ==
- FAI Cup: 1
  - 1974–75
- League of Ireland First Division Shield: 1
  - 1997–98
- FAI Intermediate Cup: 3
  - Winners: 1962–63, 1966–67, 1967–68
  - Runners Up (2): 1965–66, 1969–70
- Leinster Senior League: 2
  - 1960–61, 1963–64
- Leinster Senior Cup: 1
  - 1963–64
- FAI Junior Cup: 1
  - 1954–55
- FAI Youth Cup: 11
  - Winners: 1935–36, 1936–37, 1943–44, 1947–48, 1950–51, 1951–52, 1961–62, 1964–65, 1967–68, 1982–83, 1984–85
  - Runners Up (7): 1937–38, 1953–54, 1964–65, 1966–67, 1975–76, 1979–80, 1983–84
- FAI Under–17 Cup: 3
  - Winners: 1984–85, 1990–91, 1991–92
  - Runners Up (4): 1980–81, 1983–84, 1985–86, 1988–89
- Milk Cup: 1
  - Winners: 1988
