= Martin Bayly =

Irish footballer and manager

Personal information
- Full name: Martin Joseph Bayly
- Date of birth: 14 September 1966 (age 60)
- Place of birth: Dublin, Ireland
- Position: Midfielder

Youth career
- 1982–1984: Wolverhampton Wanderers

Senior career*
Years	Team	Apps	(Gls)
1984–1985	Wolverhampton Wanderers	10	(0)
1985	Coventry City	0	(0)
1985–1988	Sligo Rovers		
1988	Derry City		
1988–1989	UE Figueres	16	(2)
1989–1990	St Patrick's Athletic		
1990	Derry City		
1990	St James's Gate	3	(0)
1990–1991	Athlone Town	7	(3)
1991–1992	Monaghan United	24	(3)
1992–1993	Shamrock Rovers	9	(0)
1993	Home Farm	2	(0)
1993	Linfield	11	(0)
1993–1996	Home Farm		

International career
1987	Republic of Ireland U21	1	(0)

Managerial career
- 1994–1996: Home Farm
- * Club domestic league appearances and goals

Martin Joseph Bayly (born 14 September 1966) is an Irish former professional footballer and manager.

His older brother Ritchie Bayly and nephew Robert Bayly were also footballers.

== Club career ==
Born in Dublin, Bayly began his professional career as a youth player with local side Little Bray and English team Wolverhampton Wanderers. Bayly made his senior debut on 21 April 1984 in a 3–0 loss to Ipswich Town in the First Division, the first of seven consecutive appearances. He won the club's Young Player of the Year Award for the season, but made just three further appearances in the 1984–85 season before being released in the summer. In total, Bayly made a total of ten appearances in the Football League for Wolves.

Bayly was then briefly on the books at Coventry City before returning to his native Ireland to join Sligo Rovers. Bayly won the PFAI Young Player of the Year Award in 1987.

While at Sligo, Bayly played in the last ever game at Glenmalure Park in April 1987. Bayly then guested for Shamrock Rovers in a tournament in South Korea in June 1987, before moving to Derry City in 1988. After a year in Spain with UE Figueres, Bayly returned to Ireland to play with a number of clubs including St Patrick's Athletic, Derry City, St James's Gate, Athlone Town and Monaghan United, before signing with Shamrock Rovers in May 1992. Bayly was released by Shamrock Rovers in January 1993,

== International career ==
Bayly appeared for Ireland in the 1984 UEFA European Under-18 Championship and the 1985 FIFA World Youth Championship.
