= Brendan Menton Snr =

Irish football administrator and economist

Brendan Menton (1911 – 1 August 2002) was an Irish football administrator and economist. Menton was a founding member of Home Farm F.C. and later served as president of the Football Association of Ireland between 1980 and 1982. He also served on various UEFA committees.

Born in Dublin, as a youngster Menton lived at 32 Home Farm Road in the Drumcondra / Whitehall area of Northside Dublin. During the 1920s Menton and his four brothers formed Home Farm Road in order to compete in a street football league organised by Leo Fitzmaurice, the brother of Trans-Atlantic aviator James Fitzmaurice. In 1928 Home Farm Road merged with another team from this league, Richmond Road, to form Home Farm F.C. Members of the Menton family have remained involved with the club ever since and Menton himself served as the club's honorary secretary. His brother Fr. Tom Menton also served as president of Clontarf GAA from 1960 to 1972, another brother Fr. John Menton was parish priest in Whitehall, Dublin.

Menton studied economics and worked closely with T.K. Whitaker as an economist in the Department of Finance during the 1950s and 1960s. He was president of the Statistical and Social Inquiry Society of Ireland between 1977 and 1980. Menton was married and fathered four sons and a daughter. One son, Kevin Menton, played Davis Cup tennis for Ireland while another, Brendan Menton Jnr, also became a football administrator and economist. Menton Jnr was appointed chief executive of the Football Association of Ireland in 2001. He left in 2003, becoming a consultant where he worked with the Asian Football Confederation in Kuala Lumpur on the Vision Asia football development project.
