= Joseph Whelan =

Irish footballer

Joseph Whelan was an Irish footballer who played for Bohemians during the 1890s and early 20th century.

== Career ==
Whelan was one of the most important figures in the early day of football in Dublin. He was a founding member of Bohemian in 1890 and was the club's first captain. Whelan also has the honour of scoring Bohemians' first ever goal when he netted against Britannia on 1 November 1890. A respected full back, he played in the first team for over a decade and appeared in the Irish Cup Final in 1900 when Bohemians lost 2-1 to Cliftonville.

Off the field, he was Club President of Bohemian from 1900 to 1905 and Vice-President from 1905 to 1916.
