= Trevor Croly =

Irish footballer (born 1974)

Personal information
- Date of birth: 23 February 1974 (age 52)
- Place of birth: Arbour Hill, Dublin, Ireland
- Position: Defender

Youth career
- Belvedere

Senior career*
Years	Team	Apps	(Gls)
1992–1996	Drogheda United	100	(11)
1996–2003	St Patrick's Athletic	195	(3)
2003–2004	Shamrock Rovers	27	(0)
Total		322	(14)

Managerial career
- 2007: Longford Town (assistant)
- 2008: St Patrick's Athletic (assistant)
- 2009–2011: Shamrock Rovers (assistant)
- 2012: St Patrick's Athletic (assistant)
- 2013–2014: Shamrock Rovers
- 2015: Bray Wanderers
- 2017–2022: Bohemians (assistant)
- * Club domestic league appearances and goals

Trevor Croly (born 23 February 1974) is an Irish football coach and former player who played as a defender in the League of Ireland.

== Playing career ==
=== Drogheda United ===
Croly started his career with Drogheda United signing a one-year amateur deal under Pat Devlin. He made his League of Ireland debut at the RDS Arena against Shamrock Rovers on the opening day of the 1992–93 League of Ireland Premier Division season.

In March 1993 Drogheda played Aston Villa in a friendly at Tolka Park where Croly received glowing tributes: "Croly's performance was a major bonus for Drogheda, displaying ability beyond his nineteen years in a duel with Irish star Ray Houghton", wrote John Brennan in the Irish Press.

He then signed a two-year semi professional contract. In his second season Drogheda were relegated finishing last in that 1993–94 League of Ireland Premier Division season. However they bounced back immediately finishing second in the 1994–95 League of Ireland First Division season. Under Jim McLaughlin Croly again signed on for the coming season. He scored the winner in the Louth Derby in a FAI Cup clash that season

However they were again relegated at the end of the 1995–96 League of Ireland season.

=== St Patrick's Athletic ===
Despite overtures from Finn Harps and Derry City Croly signed for Brian Kerr and made his debut against ŠK Slovan Bratislava in Richmond Park's first ever European game in a 1996–97 UEFA Cup tie. He kept his place in Bratislava as Pats lost 1–0 to bow out 5–3 on aggregate. He made his domestic debut for Pats scoring the winner in a FAI League Cup tie at Shelbourne the following month. His league debut was at Dundalk on the opening day of the 1996–97 League of Ireland season.

The following season after battling through injury Croly wearing the number 12 jersey was a revelation playing a holding role in front of the back four. The season ended in glory as Pats memorably won the league in the last game in Kilkenny. Pats then drew Glasgow Celtic in the 1998–99 UEFA Champions League qualifiers. Pats drew 0–0 at Celtic Park with Croly coming off the bench with 4 minutes left. The following week at Tolka Park he was an unused substitute.

Days after the disappointment of losing to Celtic St Pats were involved in a 4 team tournament at Lansdowne Road. The Carlsberg Trophy pitted them against Liverpool with Croly appearing as a substitute in a 3–2 defeat. In the next game against S.S. Lazio the next day he again appeared as a substitute as a tired St Pats lost 4–1.

That season Croly proved his versatility by filling in at right full after Willie Burke got injured early in the season. He also alternated as a right wing back.

He played twice against FC Zimbru Chișinău as Pats were thrashed 10–0 on aggregate in the 1999–2000 UEFA Champions League qualifying round.

As the club captain under Pat Dolan his versatility proved inspirational especially in the 2001–02 League of Ireland season where Croly was ever present playing all 33 league games.

Croly played all 4 games in the 2002 UEFA Intertoto Cup as Pats beat HNK Rijeka on away goals and then went out to K.A.A. Gent on away goals.

In 2002, he signed a three-year deal but despite this his career at Richmond Park ended at the end of the 2002–03 League of Ireland Premier Division season after seven seasons and 9 European appearances.

=== Shamrock Rovers ===
In March 2003 Croly signed for Shamrock Rovers. However injury kept him out for almost the whole season with Croly only making ten league appearances making his Rovers debut on 19 September at Belfield Park. It was a unique occasion as it was a Rovers home game which was switched to the opposition's stadium.

In the 2004 League of Ireland Premier Division season he made a total of 20 appearances.

== Coaching career ==
=== Early career ===
After retiring he was appointed first team coach at Kildare County in March 2005.

Croly was appointed as defensive coach at Bohemians in March 2006.

In January 2008 he was appointed assistant manager at St Patrick's Athletic.

In December 2008 Croly was appointed assistant manager at Shamrock Rovers. In 2011, he completed a Coerver Coaching course. However he left The Hoops in June 2011 citing differences with then manager Michael O'Neill.

In December 2011 Croly managed the PFAI players at the annual FIFPro Winter Tournament in Oslo. Days later he was again appointed assistant manager at Pats

In the lead up to the 2012 FAI Cup Final Croly was rumoured to be the target as the new Shamrock Rovers manager. The manager of St Pats Liam Buckley was quoted to be uncomfortable over the link

=== Shamrock Rovers ===
Croly was confirmed as the new Shamrock Rovers manager on 7 November 2012.

Trevor Croly's contract at Shamrock Rovers was terminated by mutual consent on Saturday 2 August 2014

=== Bray Wanderers ===
In May 2015, Bray Wanderers announced that Croly had signed a three-year contract to manage the club. On 3 July 2015, Croly resigned from the club after players wages were not paid by the club.

=== Bohemians ===
Croly had enjoyed success as Keith Long's assistant since joining Bohemians and at the end of 2018 he signed a three-year contract extension with the club.

In June 2024, he was appointed academy director at the club, helping young players to transition from underage and academy football to senior football.

== Sources ==
- Brian Whelan (2010). DUFC: A Claret and Blue History.
