= Dermot Keely =

Irish footballer & manager (born 1954)

Personal information
- Date of birth: 8 March 1954 (age 72)
- Place of birth: Dublin, Ireland
- Position: Defender

Senior career*
Years	Team	Apps	(Gls)
1973–1975	Home Farm	42	(7)
1975–1978	St. Patrick's Athletic	71	(6)
1978–1981	Dundalk	81	(0)
1981–1983	Glentoran		
1983	UCD	8	(1)
1983–1988	Shamrock Rovers	71	(1)
1988–1989	Home Farm		
1989–1990	Sligo Rovers	20	(0)

International career
1981–1984	League of Ireland XI	3	(0)

Managerial career
- 1983: UCD
- 1986–1988: Shamrock Rovers
- 1989–1992: Sligo Rovers
- 1992–1993: Longford Town
- 1993–1996: Dundalk
- 1996: Finn Harps
- 1996: Athlone Town
- 1996–1998: Home Farm Everton
- 1998–2002: Shelbourne
- 2000: League of Ireland XI
- 2002–2003: Kildare County
- 2003–2003: Derry City
- 2005–2006: Dublin City
- 2007–2010: Shelbourne
- * Club domestic league appearances and goals

Dermot Keely (born 8 March 1954) is an Irish former manager and player. He was a schoolteacher by profession.

== Family ==
Keely's family played League of Ireland football at various levels. His late father Peter Keely played for Shelbourne., his brother Joe played on the same Home Farm FAI Cup winning side of 1975 as Dermot himself. His son Alan Keely, who died suddenly in May 2021, also played in the League of Ireland.

== Career ==
=== Player ===
As a player Keely started with Home Farm and then signed for St. Patrick's Athletic under Barry Bridges who appointed him club captain. He played with Terry Venables while at Richmond Park. In June 1977 he was about to depart for Adelaide on a two-year contract when the deal fell through.

He then moved to Dundalk where he made his debut against Shamrock Rovers in September 1978. In his first season the County Louth outfit won the domestic double. In 1981 Keely captained Dundalk to win the FAI Cup. The League Cup was also won this season.

Keely then signed for Glentoran in the Irish League where in his two seasons there he won the Irish Cup, a Gold Cup and an Ulster Cup.

Keely's time with Dundalk and Glentoran saw him play in notable European Cup ties. In 1979, Dundalk reached the second round of the 1979–80 European Cup and were drawn with Celtic. The first leg saw Dundalk produce a notable display to come away with a 3–2 defeat at Parkhead. In the return leg in front of a packed Oriel Park with Keely as captain, Dundalk missed a last-minute opportunity to win the tie on away goals and the game finished 0–0. This is regarded as one of the best performances by a League of Ireland club in European competition.

Two years later, Keely played his part in Glentoran's run to the second round of the European Cup. In the first leg against CSKA Sofia, they lost 2–0. However, the return leg saw Glentoran take a 2–0 lead, forcing the game into extra time. With only five minutes remaining, CSKA scored the goal they needed. The tie finished 3–2 on aggregate, which had been the closest Glentoran came to reaching the last eight of European competition since 1974.

=== Player-manager ===
Keely's first managerial job was as UCD player-manager. However, after just two months at Belfield Jim McLaughlin persuaded Keely to sign for Shamrock Rovers. He made his debut against Athlone Town in November 1983. He scored his first goal for Rovers in a 3–2 defeat to Shelbourne at Harold's Cross on 11 December 1983. When McLaughlin left at the end of the 1985/86 season to manage his home club Derry City Dermot was appointed player-manager on 16 May.

In the 1986/87 season, Rovers owners controversially announced the sale of Glenmalure Park near the end of season. However, Rovers won another double in this their final season at Milltown to bring Keely's Rovers haul to 4 League championships and 3 FAI Cups.

The 1987/88 season started with Rovers controversially playing at Tolka Park. Rovers fans boycotted the ground en masse. Every game was picketed and with the crowds practically gone the team invariably suffered. Keely was quoted years later as saying:

I didn't realise the depth of feeling about Glenmalure Park and all I wanted to do was win the League for Shamrock Rovers.

— D Keely, The Hoops (ISBN 0-7171-2121-6)

He resigned after the last game of the season on 8 April 1988. During his time at Rovers he won one Inter-League cap and represented the club 6 times in European competition.

In May 1988 Keely signed for Bray Wanderers. However, he never played for the Seasiders and by November Keely was player/assistant manager to Ray Treacy at Home Farm F.C.

=== Manager ===
He then took over as manager of Sligo Rovers in 1989 and achieved promotion in his first season. He guided Sligo Rovers to their highest Premier Division place in a decade in the 1990/91 season by finishing 5th.

After a brief spell at Longford Town he took over at Dundalk where he won the League Championship in 1995. He then guided Finn Harps to promotion to the Premier Division in 1996. After managing Athlone Town he took over the reins at Home Farm Everton where he won the League of Ireland First Division Shield in 1998.

In the calendar year 1996 Keely managed four clubs: Dundalk, Finn Harps, Athlone Town and Home Farm.

He took over as manager of Shelbourne in July 1998 and won two championships (1999–2000 and 2001–02) and one FAI Cup (2000) in his time at Tolka Park. He also guided Shels to victory over Macedonian side Sloga Jugomagnat in the first round of the 2000–01 UEFA Champions League qualifiers. Shels 1–0 win in the first leg in Skopje was the first away win for a League of Ireland side in any UEFA competitions for eighteen years.

Keely then became the first manager of new league club Kildare County in 2002. After a credible 5th-place finish he then walked out to manage Derry City lasting only 3 months

After a spell out of the game he then took over at Dublin City. He then took over the management position at Shelbourne FC in 2007 and in his first season back finished fifth in the first division. In his second season in charge, Shelbourne lead the division going into the final game, and needed a home win against mid-table Limerick to gain promotion, but were denied by a 92nd-minute equaliser, and so were overhauled by Dundalk, who won away to Kildare County. On 27 May 2010, Keely stepped down as manager of Shelbourne to become Shelbourne's youth team manager and community development officer.

Keely worked as a Maths and English teacher in De La Salle College Churchtown for over 20 years until he retired at Christmas 2011. He also has a weekly column in the Irish Sun.

== Honours ==
=== As a player ===
- League of Ireland: 5
  - Dundalk 1978/79,
  - Shamrock Rovers 1983/84, 1984/85, 1985/86, 1986/87
- FAI Cup: 5
  - Home Farm 1975
  - Dundalk 1979, 1981
  - Shamrock Rovers 1985, 1986
- League of Ireland Cup
  - Dundalk 1980/81
- Irish Cup
  - Glentoran 1983
- Gold Cup
  - Glentoran 1982/83
- Ulster Cup
  - Glentoran 1982/83
- PFAI Player of the Year:
  - Shamrock Rovers – 1983/84
- SWAI Personality of the Year
  - Shamrock Rovers – 1984/85
  - Player of the Year:
  - Shamrock Rovers – 1984/85

=== As a manager ===
- League of Ireland Premier Division: 4
  - Shamrock Rovers 1986–87
  - Dundalk 1994–95
  - Shelbourne 1999–2000, 2001–02
- FAI Cup: 2
  - Shamrock Rovers 1987
  - Shelbourne 2000
- League of Ireland First Division Shield
  - Home Farm Everton 1998
- SWAI Personality of the Year
  - Shelbourne – 2000

== Sources ==
- Paul Doolan; Robert Goggins (1993). The Hoops. Gill & MacMillan. ISBN 0-7171-2121-6.
