= Tony O'Connell =

Irish footballer

Personal information
- Full name: Anthony O'Connell
- Date of birth: 12 February 1941 (age 85)
- Place of birth: Tralee, Ireland
- Position: Forward

Senior career*
Years	Team	Apps	(Gls)
1959–1963	Shamrock Rovers		
196x	New York		
1964	Toronto City		
1964–1966	Shamrock Rovers		
1966–1969	Dundalk	37	(1)
1969–1971	Bohemians	42	(10)

International career
1966–1970	Republic of Ireland	2	(0)

Managerial career
- 19xx–19xx: Irish Schoolboys
- –1989: Tolka Rovers
- 1989–19xx: Ashtown Villa
- * Club domestic league appearances and goals

Anthony O'Connell (born 12 February 1941) is an Irish former professional footballer who played as a forward during the 1950s, 1960s and 1970s. Born in Tralee, he is the first and – as of 2026 – only man from County Kerry to have been capped by the Republic of Ireland at international level.

== Early life ==
Tony O’Connell was born in Tralee, County Kerry in February 1941 and lived in Caherslee until his family moved to Dublin when he was six.

== Career ==
=== Shamrock Rovers ===
O'Connell first came to prominence as a winger in 1959 with Shamrock Rovers when his balance and ball skills made the league sit up and take notice. He made his first team debut in a Dublin City Cup tie on 9 September 1959. He played against the likes of Valencia CF in Europe during his first spell at Rovers and won the FAI Cup in 1962. In October 1963, he was selected for the League of Ireland representative team that beat the English Football League 2–1 and his performance at left-wing against Jimmy Armfield drew praise. O'Connell had recently agreed a deal with Malcolm Allison to sign for Toronto City and his performance that night was described as a 'going away present' in the Irish Times.

There was interest from England in Tony but he snubbed them to move to America where he was nominated for an "All Star" during his spell at New York. He also played for Toronto City alongside Tony Book and Malcolm Allison in the summer of 1964. He returned to Ireland and to Shamrock Rovers in time for the 1964–65 season and won his second FAI Cup winners medal as Rovers beat Limerick on 28 April 1965. He scored the first goal in the final the following year at Dalymount Park as Rovers once again beat Limerick to win the 1966 FAI Cup. He made a total of seven appearances in Europe for Rovers. He was sent off at Prater Stadium against Rapid Wien on 16 September 1964.

=== Dundalk ===
O'Connell transferred to Dundalk during the summer of 1966, picking up more silverware as he helped Dundalk win the League of Ireland Shield and the 1966–67 League of Ireland title. However, Dundalk lost to Rovers in the FAI Cup semi-final in 1967 and 1968. His form did not go unnoticed and he earned his first full international cap for Republic of Ireland against Spain in October 1966. In total, O'Connell made 37 appearances for Dundalk, scoring one goal.

=== Bohemians ===
In March 1969, O'Connell took the revolutionary step of buying out his contract with Dundalk to sign for Bohemian F.C. In doing so, he became Bohemians' first ever professional after the club's members changed their 79-year-old constitution to allow payment to players. He made his debut for the club on 16 March in a 1–1 draw against his former club Dundalk. This decision by the members was vindicated the following season as Bohs won their first major silverware for 34 years with O'Connell scoring the winner in the 1970 FAI Cup final replay against Sligo Rovers. However, within a year of this achievement, O'Connell had hung up his boots and retired from playing after 42 league appearances and 10 league goals for Bohemians.

== Post-playing career ==
After he retired from playing, O'Connell remained involved with football as a manager. Initially, he was in charge of the Irish Schoolboy team. He later managed Tolka Rovers, winning the FAI Junior Cup in 1988–89. O'Connell then left Rovers to take charge at Ashtown Villa, a club that two of his nephews were involved in running. Under O'Connell, Ashtown qualified for the 1991 FAI Cup. Despite playing in the amateur Athletic Union League, the club beat both Dundalk and Derry City away to make the quarterfinals of the competition.

A club member of Bohemians as a player, O'Connell's association with the club continued after his football career ended. In the early 1970s, he initiated the first ever shirt sponsorship in Irish football when his textile company, Jodi, appeared on the club's red and black jerseys. He was elected Bohs' club president in 1993 and was part of the board that appointed Roddy Collins as manager in 1998. O'Connell would later sponsor a new stand in Dalymount Park, which opened in October 1999 as the "Jodi Stand", after he lobbied for grant aid to construct it. That same year, O'Connell was made Honorary Life President at the club.

He also had a spell as Manchester City's Irish scout. During his tenure as club president, the club finished league runners-up on two occasions. A further honour followed in November 2007 when O'Connell was inducted into the Bohemian F.C. Hall of Fame. Tony appeared at the Big Bohs Gig at the Olympia Theatre in Dublin alongside RTÉ's Joe Duffy and ex-boxer Bernard Dunne on 19 February 2011.

== Honours ==
Shamrock Rovers

- FAI Cup: 1962, 1965, 1966
- League of Ireland: 1963–64
- League of Ireland Shield: 1963–64
- Leinster Senior Cup: 1963–64
- Dublin City Cup: 1963–64

Dundalk

- League of Ireland: 1966–67
- Dublin City Cup: 1967–68
- League of Ireland Shield: 1966–67

Bohemians

- FAI Cup: 1970
