= Alf Grey =

English football referee

Alfred Grey
- Full name: Alfred Grey
- Born: 2 February 1935 (age 91)
- Other occupation: Referee assessor, Premier League Delegate, UEFA Delegate

Domestic
Years	League	Role
1968–1971	Football League	Linesman
1971–1972	Football League	Supplementary Referee
1972–1983	Football League	Referee

International
Years	League	Role
1977–1983	FIFA	Referee

Alfred Grey (born 2 February 1935) is an English former football referee in the English Football League and at FIFA level. During his time on the List he was based in Great Yarmouth, Norfolk.

== Career ==
Grey qualified as a referee in April 1960. He progressed via The Football Combination and became a Football League linesman in 1968. Three years later he became a supplementary referee and in 1972 he progressed to the full List. His first full season (1972–73) was coincidentally the last one for another Great Yarmouth referee who achieved honours – Norman Burtenshaw. In 1972, he made his first appearance at Wembley as a Linesman in the FA Amateur Cup Final between Enfield and Hendon. His next appearance at Wembley was as a senior linesman to Clive Thomas in the 1976 FA Cup Final between Manchester United and Southampton, which the Saints won 1–0 through a goal by Bobby Stokes. One year later he was appointed to the FIFA List. In 1978, he made yet another appearance at Wembley this time as the referee for the FA Challenge Trophy Final between Altrincham and Leatherhead.

Thereafter Grey was a regular figure in top division and other key games. He was awarded the FA Cup Final between Manchester United and Brighton at the end of his final season (1982–83). He had refereed the Sussex club earlier in the competition at Anfield when they pulled off a shock victory in a fifth round tie, Liverpool also missing a penalty. For the third time in succession the Final went to a replay. Brighton, who had been relegated, came remarkably close to an upset against Manchester United. The game ended 2-2 after extra-time but Gordon Smith of Brighton famously missed a great chance in the final minute of normal time that might have won the game. This was Grey's sixth appearance at Wembley

The replay was Grey's final domestic match. United won this game easily 4–0, the last goal an Arnold Mühren penalty. He had one more game at international level in June 1983 - a friendly in Basel between Switzerland and Brazil, which was won by the visitors by 2–1. After an active career which lasted 23 years Grey went on to become a referee assessor on the Football League. In 1990, he was appointed as Delegate on the Premier League and in 1996 a UEFA Delegate.

He retired from UEFA on 31 July 2004. His total length of service was 44 years and 4 months.

Grey is now actively involved with Gorleston Football Club (local town team in The Premier Division of the Eastern Counties League) as an Honorary Vice President.

Preceded by Clive White	FA Cup Final Referee; 1983	Succeeded by John Hunting
