= Seán Thomas =

Irish football manager

Personal information
- Place of birth: Dublin, Ireland
- Date of death: 24 June 1999

Managerial career
- Years: Team
- 1959–1960: Sligo Rovers
- 1960–1961: Home Farm
- 1961–1964: Shamrock Rovers
- 1963: League of Ireland XI
- 1964–1973: Bohemians
- 1966–1973: Republic of Ireland U23
- 1973: Rep. of Ireland
- 1976–1977: Shamrock Rovers
- 1977–1979: Athlone Town

Seán Thomas (died 24 June 1999) was an Irish football manager.

== Club management ==
After a short playing career with Home Farm and C.Y.M.S., a left back who had to give up playing because of an injury, he attended Loughborough University for periods from 1956–1959 to learn all the aspects of successful coaching. Thomas had short spells as coach at Sligo Rovers and Home Farm before moving to Shamrock Rovers in 1961 for Rovers' tour in the International Soccer League (1960-1965). In his 3 years at Glenmalure Park, he picked up one League of Ireland title, 2 FAI Cups and 2 League of Ireland Shields. After the 2–2 draw with Valencia CF at the Estadio Mestalla in the Inter-Cities Fairs Cup on 10 October 1963, Thomas commented "to say I am proud of the team is an understatement, I have never felt so proud of Shamrock Rovers as I have tonight. Their performance was the finest I have seen in my three years at the club".

After a bust up with the Cunninghams (Rovers' owners) at the end of the 1963–64 season, he quit the Hoops.

Thomas joined Bohemians, becoming the amateur club's first ever manager. Previous coaches had been solely responsible for training, with team selection for match days made by a five-man selection committee, but Thomas was given the authority to choose his own squad. It was a homecoming of sorts for Thomas as he grew up on the Phibsborough Road which backed on to Dalymount Park and was an associate member of the club in his early years. Bohs had finished last the previous season and Thomas showed his credentials by managing the then still amateur Bohemians to a 3rd-place finish that season, just 5 points behind winners Drumcondra. This was a remarkable achievement considering the rest of the league was professional and Thomas was awarded Irish Soccer Writers' Personality of the Year. The following season, Bohs once again finished 3rd in the league and this time, won the Leinster Senior Cup and Presidents Cup. The performances of his young players were noticed however and 8 of the amateur team left at the end of the season for the professional ranks; Turlough O'Connor and Jimmy Conway for Fulham and Larry Gilmore and Kevin Murray for Dundalk. He signed a three-year contract in April 1966. The predicted collapse never happened and the "Gypsies" went one better and finished runners-up in the 1966–67 season.

Thomas's abilities did not go unnoticed and Boston Shamrocks enticed him across the Atlantic for the newly proposed American League. This move turned sour though as Boston failed to gain a place in the elite league and within a year, Thomas had returned to Dalymount Park. After the heroics of the previous seasons, Bohs finished rock bottom of the league without Thomas and were in dire straits financially. 1968/69 brought little joy on the field but off it, an historic EGM of Bohemian members in February 1969 saw the club's constitution changed to allow payment to players. Tony O'Connell, Dinny Lowry and Johnny Fullam were soon signed and in 1970 Bohs won their first major trophy for 34 years when beating Sligo Rovers in the FAI Cup Final. This success meant Bohs would enter European competition for the first time.

During this time Thomas spotted Liam Neeson and he appeared as a substitute against Shamrock Rovers in a trial game.

Bohs finished fourth, third and third again in the next 3 seasons under Thomas's guidance with the young talents of Mick Martin and Gerry Daly flourishing. In July 1973, Thomas resigned as manager of Bohemians.

He would not be out of the game for long however and later had spells back at Shamrock Rovers, where he won the League Cup in 1976. This triumph was Rovers' first trophy in seven years and it was the 7th different competition Thomas had won with the club.

Thomas became manager of Athlone Town in 1977. He also managed Bray Wanderers.

== International management ==
Seán Thomas managed the League of Ireland XI team that defeated their English counterparts 2–1 at Dalymount Park in 1963. He also managed the Under-23 Republic of Ireland side on three separate occasions; all 0–0 draws with France.

While managing Bohemians, Thomas took over as caretaker manager of the Republic of Ireland national football team in June 1973 after the resignation of Liam Tuohy. He took charge for one game, an international friendly against Norway at Ullevaal Stadion. The match ended in a 1–1 score draw. Thomas was replaced in October 1973 when Johnny Giles was appointed as the full-time manager.

== Honours as manager ==
=== Team ===
League of Ireland: 1

- Shamrock Rovers - 1963-64

FAI Cup: 3

- Shamrock Rovers - 1962, 1964
- Bohemians - 1970

League of Ireland Cup: 1

- Shamrock Rovers - 1976

League of Ireland Shield: 2

- Shamrock Rovers - 1962–63, 1963–64
- Top Four Cup: 1
- Bohemians - 1972
- Dublin City Cup: 1
- Shamrock Rovers - 1963-64
- Leinster Senior Cup: 1
- Shamrock Rovers - 1963-64
- LFA President's Cup: 1
- Shamrock Rovers - 1963-64

=== Personal ===
- SWAI Personality of the Year: 1965
- Bohemians - 1964/65
- PFAI Merit Award: 1992
- 1992
