= 1982–83 FA Cup =

Tournament details
- Country: England; Wales

Final positions
- Champions: Manchester United (5th title)
- Runners-up: Brighton & Hove Albion

Tournament statistics
- Top goal scorer(s): Tony Woodcock; Graham Rix (4 goals)

The 1982–83 FA Cup was the 102nd season of the world's oldest football knockout competition, the Football Association Challenge Cup, or FA Cup for short. The competition was won by Manchester United, who drew the first final 2–2, but won the replay 4–0.

== Qualifying rounds ==
Most participating clubs that were not members of the Football League competed in the qualifying rounds to secure one of 28 places available in the first round.

The winners from the fourth qualifying round were Scarborough, North Shields, Mossley, Workington, Northwich Victoria, Horwich RMI, Macclesfield Town, Telford United, Boston United, Kettering Town, Worcester City, Holbeach United, Shepshed Charterhouse, Bishop's Stortford, Wokingham Town, Chesham United, Dagenham, Wealdstone, Dartford, Carshalton Athletic, Maidstone United, Worthing, Folkestone, Windsor & Eton, Slough Town, Wimborne Town, Yeovil Town and Weymouth.

Appearing in the competition proper for the first time were Holbeach United, Shepshed Charterhouse, Wokingham Town and Wimborne Town. Of the others, Telford United had last featured at this stage in 1973–74, while North Shields and Carshalton Athletic had last done so in 1969–70, Worthing had not done so since 1936–37 and Horwich RMI had not done so since 1928–29.

In returning to the competition proper after a 46-year absence, Worthing participated in seven rounds of the tournament and defeated Fleet Town, Crawley Town, Eastleigh, Farnborough Town, Minehead and Dartford before going out to Oxford United at the Manor Ground.

== First round proper ==
The 48 teams from the Football League Third and Fourth Divisions entered in this round along with the 28 non-league clubs from the qualifying rounds and Enfield, Altrincham, Barnet and Wycombe Wanderers who were given byes. The first round of games were played over the weekend 20–21 November 1982. Replays were played on the 22nd-24th. Wimborne Town, from the Western League First Division at Step 9 of English Football, was the lowest-ranked team in the round.

Tie no	Home team	Score	Away team	Date
1	Enfield (5)	0–0	Newport County	20 November 1982
Replay	Newport County	4–2	Enfield	23 November 1982
2	Blackpool	3–0	Horwich RMI (8)	20 November 1982
3	Chester	1–1	Northwich Victoria (5)	20 November 1982
Replay	Northwich Victoria	3–1	Chester	22 November 1982
4	Chesterfield	2–2	Peterborough United	20 November 1982
Replay	Peterborough United	2–1	Chesterfield	24 November 1982
5	Darlington	0–1	Scunthorpe United	20 November 1982
6	AFC Bournemouth	0–2	Southend United	20 November 1982
7	Preston North End	5–1	Shepshed Charterhouse (8)	20 November 1982
8	Weymouth (5)	4–3	Maidstone United (5)	20 November 1982
9	Worthing (7)	2–1	Dartford (6)	20 November 1982
10	Reading	1–2	Bishop's Stortford (6)	20 November 1982
11	Walsall	3–0	Kettering Town (5)	20 November 1982
12	Gillingham	1–0	Dagenham (5)	20 November 1982
13	Macclesfield Town (6)	1–5	Worcester City (5)	20 November 1982
14	Swindon Town	2–0	Wealdstone (5)	20 November 1982
15	Tranmere Rovers	4–2	Scarborough (5)	20 November 1982
16	Brentford	7–0	Windsor & Eton (8)	20 November 1982
17	Bristol Rovers	1–0	Wycombe Wanderers (6)	20 November 1982
18	Northampton Town	2–2	Wimbledon	20 November 1982
Replay	Wimbledon	0–2	Northampton Town	23 November 1982
19	Portsmouth	4–1	Hereford United	20 November 1982
20	Plymouth Argyle	2–0	Exeter City	20 November 1982
21	Hull City	1–1	Sheffield United	20 November 1982
Replay	Sheffield United	2–0	Hull City	23 November 1982
22	Altrincham (5)	2–1	Rochdale	20 November 1982
23	Huddersfield Town	1–0	Mossley (6)	20 November 1982
24	Mansfield Town	3–2	Stockport County	20 November 1982
25	Port Vale	0–1	Bradford City	20 November 1982
26	Halifax Town	0–1	North Shields (8)	20 November 1982
27	Chesham United (7)	0–1	Yeovil Town (5)	20 November 1982
28	Workington (6)	1–2	Doncaster Rovers	20 November 1982
29	Carshalton Athletic (6)	4–0	Barnet (5)	20 November 1982
30	York City	3–1	Bury	20 November 1982
31	Aldershot	4–0	Wimborne Town (9)	20 November 1982
32	Wigan Athletic	0–0	Telford United (5)	21 November 1982
Replay	Telford United	2–1	Wigan Athletic	23 November 1982
33	Boston United (5)	3–1	Crewe Alexandra	20 November 1982
34	Holbeach United (8)	0–4	Wrexham	20 November 1982
35	Colchester United	0–2	Torquay United	20 November 1982
36	Slough Town (6)	1–0	Millwall	20 November 1982
37	Wokingham Town (6)	1–1	Cardiff City	20 November 1982
Replay	Cardiff City	3–0	Wokingham Town	23 November 1982
38	Oxford United	5–2	Folkestone (7)	20 November 1982
39	Orient	4–1	Bristol City	20 November 1982
40	Hartlepool United	3–0	Lincoln City	20 November 1982

== Second round proper ==
The second round of games were played on 11 December 1982. Replays were played on 14–15 and 20 December. This round featured one team from Step 8 of the football pyramid: North Shields from the Northern League.

Tie no	Home team	Score	Away team	Date
1	Preston North End	2–1	Blackpool	11 December 1982
2	Gillingham	1–1	Northampton Town	11 December 1982
Replay	Northampton Town	3–2	Gillingham	14 December 1982
3	Swindon Town	2–2	Brentford	11 December 1982
Replay	Brentford	1–3	Swindon Town	14 December 1982
4	Bristol Rovers	2–2	Plymouth Argyle	11 December 1982
Replay	Plymouth Argyle	1–0	Bristol Rovers	20 December 1982
5	Portsmouth	1–3	Aldershot	11 December 1982
6	Worcester City (5)	2–1	Wrexham	11 December 1982
7	Altrincham (5)	0–1	Huddersfield Town	11 December 1982
8	Southend United	3–0	Yeovil Town (5)	11 December 1982
9	Scunthorpe United	2–1	Northwich Victoria (5)	11 December 1982
10	Mansfield Town	1–1	Bradford City	11 December 1982
Replay	Bradford City	3–2	Mansfield Town	15 December 1982
11	Cardiff City	2–3	Weymouth (5)	11 December 1982
12	Newport County	1–0	Orient	11 December 1982
13	Torquay United	4–1	Carshalton Athletic (6)	11 December 1982
14	North Shields (8)	0–3	Walsall	11 December 1982
15	Boston United (5)	1–1	Sheffield United	11 December 1982
Replay	Sheffield United	5–1	Boston United	14 December 1982
16	Peterborough United	5–2	Doncaster Rovers	11 December 1982
17	Slough Town (6)	1–4	Bishop's Stortford (6)	11 December 1982
18	Oxford United	4–0	Worthing (7)	11 December 1982
19	Telford United (5)	1–1	Tranmere Rovers	11 December 1982
Replay	Tranmere Rovers	2–1	Telford United	14 December 1982
20	Hartlepool United	1–1	York City	11 December 1982
Replay	York City	4–0	Hartlepool United	14 December 1982

== Third round proper ==
Teams from the Football League First and Second Division entered in this round. The third round of games in the FA Cup were played on 8 January 1983. Replays took place over 11–12 January, with a second replay on the 24th. Bishop's Stortford, from the Isthmian League Premier Division (Step 6), was the lowest-ranked team in the round while Worcester City, Weymouth and Bishop's Stortford were the last non-league clubs left in the competition.

Tie no	Home team	Score	Away team	Date
1	Watford (1)	2–0	Plymouth Argyle (3)	8 January 1983
2	Walsall (3)	0–0	Birmingham City (1)	8 January 1983
Replay	Birmingham City	1–0	Walsall	11 January 1983
3	Leicester City (2)	2–3	Notts County (1)	8 January 1983
4	Blackburn Rovers (2)	1–2	Liverpool (1)	8 January 1983
5	Middlesbrough (2)	2–2	Bishop's Stortford (6)	8 January 1983
Replay	Bishop's Stortford	1–2	Middlesbrough	11 January 1983
6	West Bromwich Albion (1)	3–2	Queens Park Rangers (2)	8 January 1983
7	Sunderland (1)	0–0	Manchester City (1)	8 January 1983
Replay	Manchester City	2–1	Sunderland	12 January 1983
8	Derby County (2)	2–0	Nottingham Forest (1)	8 January 1983
9	Luton Town (1)	3–0	Peterborough United (4)	8 January 1983
10	Swindon Town (4)	7–0	Aldershot (4)	8 January 1983
11	Shrewsbury Town (2)	2–1	Rotherham United (2)	8 January 1983
12	Sheffield United (3)	0–0	Stoke City (1)	8 January 1983
Replay	Stoke City	3–2	Sheffield United	12 January 1983
13	Tranmere Rovers (4)	0–1	Wolverhampton Wanderers (2)	8 January 1983
14	Tottenham Hotspur (1)	1–0	Southampton (1)	8 January 1983
15	Northampton Town (4)	0–1	Aston Villa (1)	8 January 1983
16	Coventry City (1)	3–1	Worcester City (5)	8 January 1983
17	Brighton & Hove Albion (1)	1–1	Newcastle United (2)	8 January 1983
Replay	Newcastle United	0–1	Brighton & Hove Albion	12 January 1983
18	Manchester United (1)	2–0	West Ham United (1)	8 January 1983
19	Norwich City (1)	2–1	Swansea City (1)	8 January 1983
20	Bradford City (3)	0–1	Barnsley (2)	8 January 1983
21	Carlisle United (2)	2–2	Burnley (2)	8 January 1983
Replay	Burnley	3–1	Carlisle United	11 January 1983
22	Oldham Athletic (2)	0–2	Fulham (2)	8 January 1983
23	Crystal Palace (2)	2–1	York City (4)	8 January 1983
24	Southend United (3)	0–0	Sheffield Wednesday (2)	8 January 1983
Replay	Sheffield Wednesday	2–2	Southend United	11 January 1983
Replay	Sheffield Wednesday	2–1	Southend United	24 January 1983
25	Scunthorpe United (4)	0–0	Grimsby Town (2)	8 January 1983
Replay	Grimsby Town	2–0	Scunthorpe United	11 January 1983
26	Huddersfield Town (3)	1–1	Chelsea (2)	8 January 1983
Replay	Chelsea	2–0	Huddersfield Town	12 January 1983
27	Newport County (3)	1–1	Everton (1)	8 January 1983
Replay	Everton	2–1	Newport County	11 January 1983
28	Charlton Athletic (2)	2–3	Ipswich Town (1)	8 January 1983
29	Arsenal (1)	2–1	Bolton Wanderers (2)	8 January 1983
30	Leeds United (2)	3–0	Preston North End (3)	8 January 1983
31	Cambridge United (2)	1–0	Weymouth (5)	8 January 1983
32	Oxford United (3)	1–1	Torquay United (4)	8 January 1983
Replay	Torquay United	2–1	Oxford United	12 January 1983

== Fourth round proper ==
The fourth round of games were mainly played over the weekend 29 –30 January 1983. Some games were replayed on 1–2 February, with a second replay on 9 February. Swindon Town and Torquay United from the Fourth Division were the lowest-ranked teams in the round and the last clubs from the First Round left in the competition.

Tie no	Home team	Score	Away team	Date
1	Burnley	3–1	Swindon Town	29 January 1983
2	Liverpool	2–0	Stoke City	29 January 1983
3	Watford	1–1	Fulham	29 January 1983
Replay	Fulham	1–2	Watford	1 February 1983
4	Aston Villa	1–0	Wolverhampton Wanderers	29 January 1983
5	Middlesbrough	2–0	Notts County	29 January 1983
6	Derby County	2–1	Chelsea	29 January 1983
7	Luton Town	0–2	Manchester United	29 January 1983
8	Everton	2–1	Shrewsbury Town	30 January 1983
9	Ipswich Town	2–0	Grimsby Town	29 January 1983
10	Tottenham Hotspur	2–1	West Bromwich Albion	29 January 1983
11	Coventry City	2–2	Norwich City	29 January 1983
Replay	Norwich City	2–1	Coventry City	2 February 1983
12	Brighton & Hove Albion	4–0	Manchester City	29 January 1983
13	Crystal Palace	1–0	Birmingham City	29 January 1983
14	Arsenal	1–1	Leeds United	29 January 1983
Replay	Leeds United	1–1	Arsenal	2 February 1983
Replay	Arsenal	2–1	Leeds United	9 February 1983
15	Torquay United	2–3	Sheffield Wednesday	29 January 1983
16	Cambridge United	1–0	Barnsley	29 January 1983

== Fifth round proper ==
The fifth set of games were all played on 19–20 February 1983. Two replays were played on 28 February. Holders Tottenham Hotspur were eliminated by Everton – their first defeat in the competition since March 1980. However, because both Everton and Liverpool were drawn to play at home in this round, there was one game played on Sunday 20 February: Liverpool v Brighton with Everton v Tottenham on the same day as the other R5 ties

Tie no	Home team	Score	Away team	Date
1	Liverpool	1–2	Brighton & Hove Albion	20 February 1983
2	Aston Villa	4–1	Watford	19 February 1983
3	Middlesbrough	1–1	Arsenal	19 February 1983
Replay	Arsenal	3–2	Middlesbrough	28 February 1983
4	Derby County	0–1	Manchester United	19 February 1983
5	Everton	2–0	Tottenham Hotspur	19 February 1983
6	Norwich City	1–0	Ipswich Town	19 February 1983
7	Crystal Palace	0–0	Burnley	19 February 1983
Replay	Burnley	1–0	Crystal Palace	28 February 1983
8	Cambridge United	1–2	Sheffield Wednesday	19 February 1983

== Sixth round proper ==
The sixth round of FA Cup games were played on 12 March 1983 with a replay on the 15 March.

Tie no	Home team	Score	Away team	Date
1	Burnley	1–1	Sheffield Wednesday	12 March 1983
Replay	Sheffield Wednesday	5–0	Burnley	15 March 1983
2	Brighton & Hove Albion	1–0	Norwich City	12 March 1983
3	Manchester United	1–0	Everton	12 March 1983
4	Arsenal	2–0	Aston Villa	12 March 1983

== Semi finals ==
16 April 1983

Brighton & Hove Albion	2–1	Sheffield Wednesday
Case 15'; Robinson 78'		Miročević 57'

Highbury, London
Referee: George Courtney (Spennymoor)

16 April 1983

Manchester United	2–1	Arsenal
B. Robson 49'; Norman Whiteside 70'		Tony Woodcock 36'

Villa Park, Birmingham
Referee: Keith Hackett (Sheffield)

== Final ==
21 May 1983

Manchester United	2–2 (a.e.t.)	Brighton & Hove Albion
Stapleton 55'; Wilkins 72'		Smith 14'; Stevens 87'

Wembley, London
Attendance: 100,000
Referee: Alf Grey (Norfolk)

Man United	Brighton

=== Replay ===
26 May 1983

Manchester United	4–0	Brighton & Hove Albion
Robson 25' 44'; Whiteside 30'; Mühren 62' (pen.)

Wembley, London
Attendance: 92,000
Referee: Alf Grey (Norfolk)

Man United	Brighton

== Television coverage ==
The right to show FA Cup games were, as with Football League matches, shared between the BBC and ITV network. All games were shown in a highlights format, except the Final, which was shown live both on BBC1 and ITV. The BBC football highlights programme Match of the Day would show up to three games and the various ITV regional network stations would cover up to one game and show highlights from other games covered elsewhere on the ITV network. The BBC showed brief highlights of two FA Cup games from rounds One and Two after League highlights games. For the first time since the 1970–71 season, an ITV Region (TVS) showed highlights of one Second Round tie, Portsmouth v Aldershot. Highlights of replays would be shown on either the BBC or ITV.

This Season ITV Highlights with the regional highlights programmes were back on Saturday nights while BBC1 Highlights under Match Of The Day were back on Sunday afternoons in the final season of the four-year alternation deal and also the final season of ITV regional highlights.

- First Round Blackpool v Horwich RMI BBC1
- Second Round BBC1 Boston United v Sheffield United, ITV Portsmouth v Aldershot (TVS)
- Third Round BBC1 Manchester United v West Ham United, Northampton Town v Aston Villa, Tottenham Hotspur v Southampton, Newcastle United v Brighton & Hove Albion (Midweek replay), Manchester City v Sunderland (Midweek replay) ITV Derby County v Nottingham Forest (Central), Charlton Athletic v Ipswich Town (LWT and Anglia), Blackburn Rovers v Liverpool (Granada), Sunderland v Manchester City (Tyne-Tees)
- Fourth Round BBC1 Aston Villa v Wolverhampton Wanderers, Watford v Fulham, Brighton & Hove Albion v Manchester City ITV Tottenham Hotspur v West Bromwich Albion (LWT and Central),Luton Town v Manchester United (Anglia, later Granada), Middlesbrough v Notts County (Tyne-Tees), Liverpool v Stoke City (Granada), Leeds United v Arsenal (Midweek replay All regions), Norwich City v Coventry City (Midweek replay All regions)
- Fifth Round BBC1 Norwich City v Ipswich Town, Crystal Palace v Burnley, Derby County v Manchester United ITV Aston Villa v Watford (Central and LWT), Everton v Tottenham Hotspur (Granada), Middlesbrough v Arsenal (Tyne-Tees), Cambridge United v Sheffield Wednesday (Anglia and Yorkshire)
- Sixth Round BBC1 Arsenal v Aston Villa, Burnley v Sheffield Wednesday ITV Manchester United v Everton (Granada and LWT), Brighton & Hove Albion v Norwich City (TVS and Anglia) All regions showed those two games
- FA Cup Semi-Finals BBC1 Arsenal v Manchester United ITV Brighton & Hove Albion v Sheffield Wednesday (All regions)
- FA Cup Final Brighton & Hove Albion v Manchester United Live on BBC1 and ITV (All Regions) (Both games)
