= Bohemian F.C. =

Association football club in Ireland

Bohemian Football Club
- Full name: Bohemian Football Club
- Nicknames: The Gypsies; Dublin's Originals
- Short name: Bohemians; Bohs
- Founded: 6 September 1890; 136 years ago
- Ground: Dalymount Park
- Capacity: 4,500
- Owner: Fan owned
- Manager: Alan Reynolds
- League: League of Ireland Premier Division
- 2025: League of Ireland Premier Division, 4th of 10
- Website: bohemians.ie
| Home colours | Away colours | Third colours |

Bohemian Football Club (Irish: An Cumann Peile Bóihéamach), more commonly referred to as Bohemians or Bohs, is an Irish professional association football club based in Dublin. Bohemians compete in the Premier Division of the League of Ireland. Bohs are the fourth-most successful club in League of Ireland football history, having won the League of Ireland title 11 times, the FAI Cup seven times, the League of Ireland Shield six times. and the League of Ireland Cup three times. Prior to the establishment of the Football Association of Ireland and League of Ireland, Bohemians competed in the Irish Football League and Irish Cup, which were then all-Ireland competitions. During that period, they won the Irish Cup once and finished runners-up five times. They hold the record for Leinster Senior Cup wins with 33 cups claimed.

Bohemians were founded by members of Bell's Academy (a Civil Service college), the Royal Hibernian Military School (a school for orphaned children of members of the British armed forces in Ireland), medical students and others, on 6 September 1890 in the Phoenix Park Gate Lodge beside the North Circular Road entrance and played its first games in the Park's Polo Grounds. They were one of the founding members of the League of Ireland in 1921, after their withdrawal from the Irish Football League. They established themselves as a major force within the first 15 years of the League of Ireland, winning five league titles, two FAI Cups, and four Shields, but struggled for decades after that, largely due to their strict amateur status, going 34 seasons without winning a major trophy.

Bohemians dropped their amateur ethos in 1969 and won two League titles, two FAI Cups, and two League cups during the 1970s. They suffered further decline throughout the 1980s and most of the 1990s before claiming League and Cup doubles in 2001 and 2008, alongside the 2003 and most recently 2009 title wins. They are the only club to have won all four domestic trophy "doubles" available in Irish football history (League and FAI Cup, League and Shield, League and Dublin City Cup, and League and League Cup).

Bohemians play their home matches at Dalymount Park in Phibsborough on the northside of Dublin. They are owned 100% by the members of the club. Their club colours are red and black, which they adopted 1894. Bohemians supporters often refer to their club by a number of nicknames including Bohs, The Gypsies, and Dublin's Originals, and provide one half of a bitter rivalry with southside club, Shamrock Rovers. Since the 2010s, Bohemians have adopted a left-wing political culture at the club.

== History ==
Chart of yearly table positions for Bohemians in League of Ireland

Bohemian Football Club was founded on 6 September 1890 at the Phoenix Park's North Circular Gate Lodge by students from Bells Academy, a civil service college, and the Hibernian Military School. Also known as Bohemians, the club initially played their home games at the Polo Grounds in the Phoenix Park before moving to Jones Road in 1893. The following year, Bohemians adopted red and black as their club colours having previously played in white shirts with two red stripes. In 1895, they reached the final of the Irish Cup but lost to Linfield in Belfast. They became the first Dublin club to join the Irish Football League in 1902 and were members from 1902 to 1911 and from 1912 to 1920. During their time in the Irish Football League, the club won the Irish Cup in 1908.

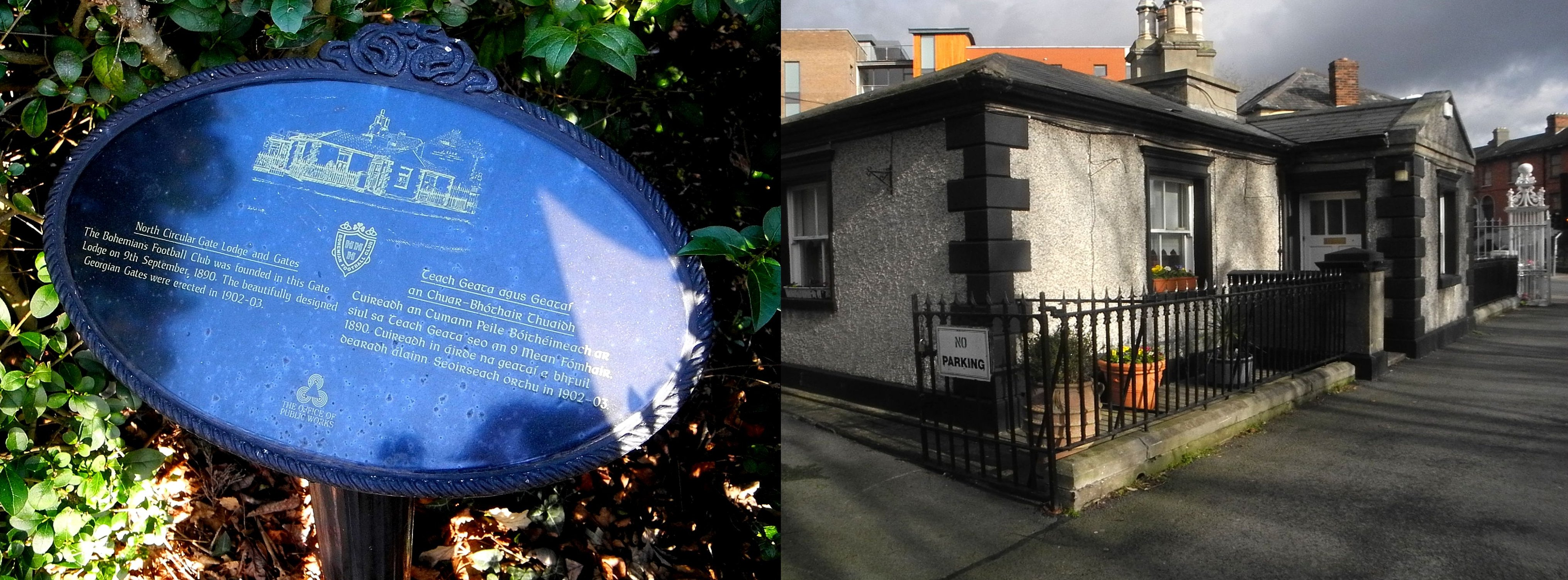
(Left) A commemorative plaque to honour the founding of Bohemians and (right) the gate lodge leading onto the North Circular Road in the Phoenix Park.

It was a founding member of the League of Ireland in 1921, and it is one of only two clubs to have been members of the League of Ireland since its inception (the other being Shelbourne), and it is the only club to have been ever-present in the top division of the league. In its first season it finished second in the league, just two points behind St. James Gate. The club won its first league title in 1924. In 1928 the club won its second league title and completed a double that season by winning its first FAI Cup also. The club was one of the major forces in the early years of the league, going on to win another three league titles and another FAI Cup in the next eight seasons. In the 1920s, a sister club, Bohemian Queens, was founded in Queens, New York by former Bohemian F.C. players who had emigrated to the United States.

After this success, Bohemian F.C. began to struggle, often finishing at the foot of the league and rarely mounting a title challenge, largely because of an inability to attract or keep top players due to a strict amateur ethos, which had been a fundamental part of the club since its formation. The club went 34 seasons without winning a major trophy.

=== End of amateur era ===
In 1969 the club ended its amateur status, and the first player to sign professional terms was Tony O'Connell, who signed on 11 March 1969. The club then went on to win two league titles, two FAI Cups and two league cups in the 1970s, more trophies than any other club that decade. In 1970 the club entered European competition for the first time where it was beaten in the first qualifying round of the European Cup Winners' Cup (see below). The club went through another trophy-less spell after its 1979 league cup victory, which was not broken until the club won its fifth FAI Cup in 1992.

It was not until 2001 that it regained the league title, also winning the FAI Cup that season to complete its second double. After adding another league title in 2003, Bohemians triumphed once again in 2008, under Pat Fenlon, winning the double of both the league for the tenth time with four league games still to play, and the FAI cup in a penalty shoot-out. In September 2009, Bohemians claimed the League Cup for the third time in the club's history with a 3–1 win over Waterford United in the final.

On 6 November 2009, Bohemians retained the title after a 1–1 draw against Bray Wanderers. They were already assured of the league title before the final round of matches as they held a three-point lead and 16-goal difference advantage over their nearest rivals Shamrock Rovers. Captain Owen Heary collected the Premier Division trophy for the club's first back-to-back league win. In 2010, Bohs narrowly missed out on a third league title in a row, losing to Shamrock Rovers on goal difference. This season also saw them suffer European disappointment at the hands of Welsh club TNS.

== Grounds ==
Bohemians' first home ground was the Polo Grounds in the Phoenix Park. Goal posts and other equipment were kept at the park's gate lodge on North Circular Road which also doubled as a dressing room. They remained there until the 1893–94 season when they obtained a private ground on Jones Road, later known as Croke Park, the headquarters of the Gaelic Athletic Association. At the time, the space was called the City and Suburban Sports Grounds and included the area previously occupied by the Old Belvedere playing pitches, later becoming the Cusack Stand. For the first time it was possible for Bohemians to charge for admission to home matches, generating revenue for the club.

The club moved to a new home at Whitehall Farm, Glasnevin, in time for the start of the 1895–96 season. The venue was located across from the main entrance to Glasnevin cemetery but the club found the ground to be unsatisfactory and resumed their search for suitable accommodation. In those days, the area was out of the way and without public transport so the Bohemian committee continued to look for a new home ground.

=== Dalymount Park ===
Their search came to an end when they moved to Dalymount Park which was officially opened on 7 September 1901. The first match was played between Bohemians and Shelbourne F.C. and a crowd of 3,000 saw a 4–2 victory for Bohs.

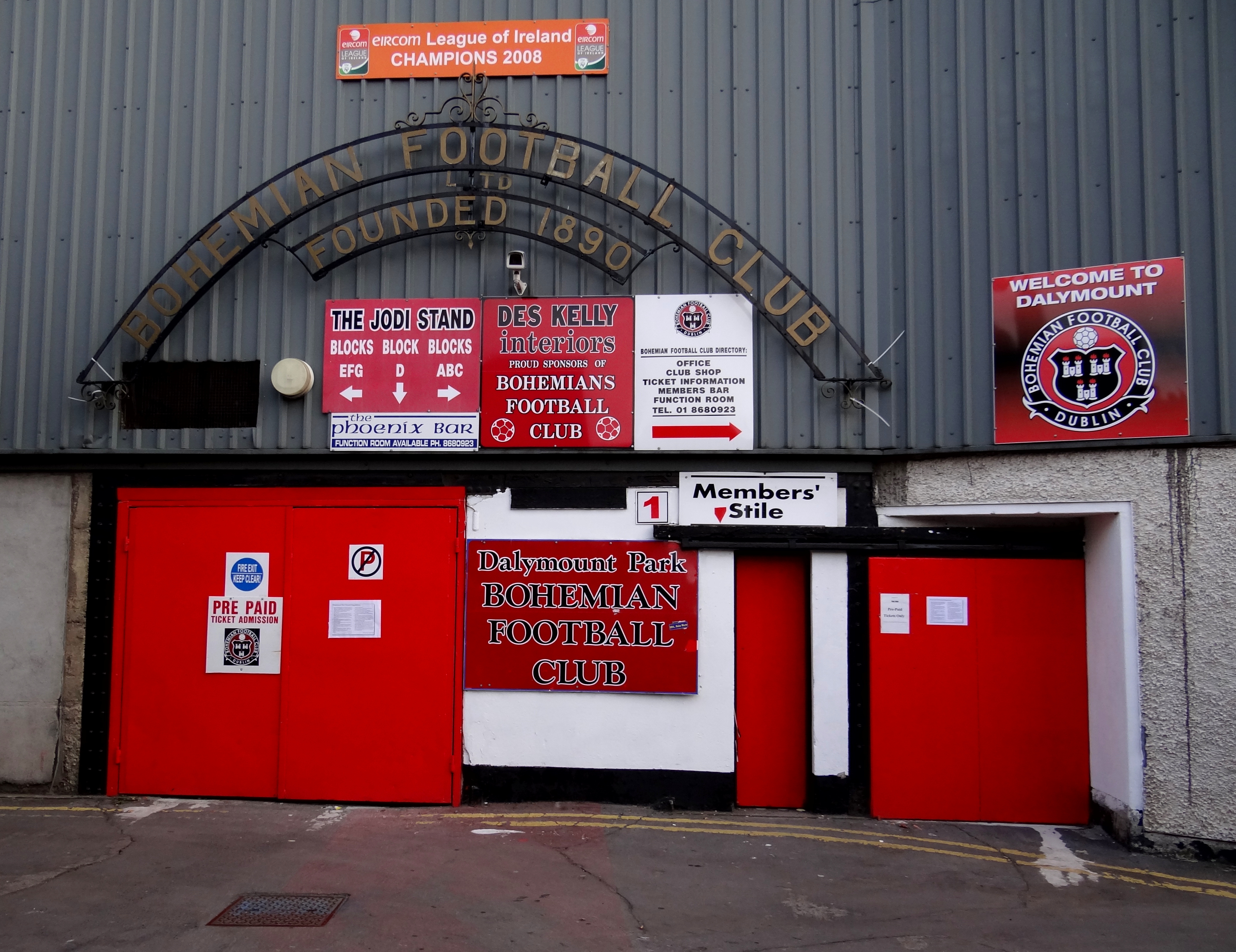
One of the entrances to Dalymount Park, 2012

A crowd of 6,000 spectators witnessed the first Irish Cup final to be staged at Dalymount Park as Distillery overcame Bohemians by three goals to one in 1903. Shelbourne become the first Dublin side to win the cup in 1906 when they defeated Belfast Celtic at Dalymount by two goals to nil.

In 1988, the club nearly sold Dalymount to the FAI due to financial difficulties, but the club survived and held onto the stadium. In 1999, the club unveiled the near 3,000 seater Jodi Stand. In 2003, a deal was agreed to sell the Tramway End to the owner of the Phibsboro Shopping Centre, a property company named Albion.

In 2006 the club's members twice voted to sell Dalymount Park; first to Andorey Developments in May and then again in September, this time to property developer Liam Carroll. Both offers included the development of a new 10,000-capacity stadium elsewhere in Dublin. The Carroll deal was worth a reported €65,000,000 although then board members refused to allow members to see the details of the deal. This deal included the development of a new 10,000-seater stadium in Harristown near Dublin Airport. However, Albion objected to the sale based on their claim to ownership of the Tramway End. Bohemians maintained that the 2003 purchase had not been finalised but, on 7 November 2008, the club lost a court case against Albion Properties Ltd over legal ownership of the stand. it was discovered that the board, led by Gerry Cuffe and Gerry Conway, had attempted to re-sell part of the ground which the club no longer owned, which has had the effect of putting the move on hold long enough for the property market to collapse and the deal to be all but dead.

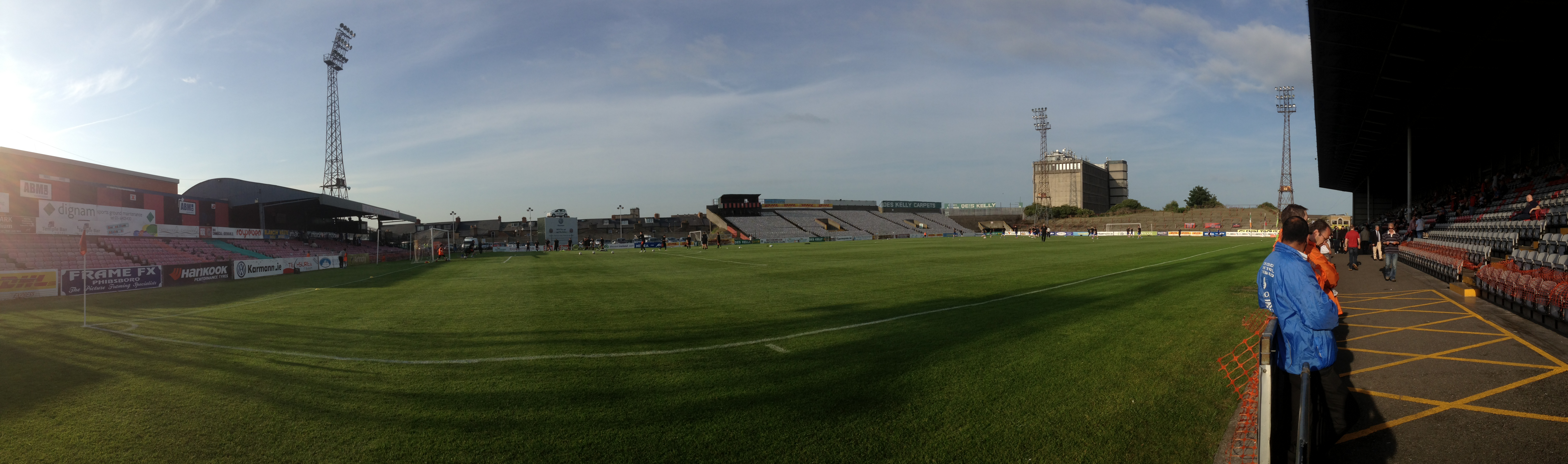
Panoramic view of inside Dalymount Park

In March 2015, the local authority Dublin City Council (DCC) agreed to purchase Dalymount Park. The city council completed the purchase in June 2015 for €3.8 million. In February 2016, DCC published plans to demolish and rebuild Dalymount on a phased basis at a cost of €20 million. In October 2022, the city council published its updated redevelopment plans, with a proposed capacity of 7,880 and a completion date of 2026. It is likely that Bohemians would need to play elsewhere during redevelopment.

In 2023, the club unveiled a new terrace stand at the club, named the "Mono Stand" in tribute to Derek "Mono" Monaghan, a long-time supporter and volunteer at the club who died in 2022.

== European record ==
Although they did not make their first appearance in European competition until 1970, they have, like all Irish clubs, found the going tough in Europe; but they have had some successes. They eliminated Scottish Premier League club (and former Cup Winners' Cup and European Super Cup champions) Aberdeen from the UEFA Cup in August 2000. That triumph was set up by a 2–1 victory away from home, in which Bohs scored two late goals to overturn a 1–0 deficit. That was the first time an Irish club defeated British opposition away from home in European competition. Other notable results include wins against Rangers and Kaiserslautern (away); and draws against Rangers, Newcastle United, Sporting CP, Dundee United (away) and Aberdeen. In all, they have beaten a total of 11 different teams, from nine countries. Bohs bowed out of the 2008 Intertoto Cup on away goals to Latvian side FK Riga despite winning the second leg 2–1. Earlier in that campaign they recorded their biggest single leg (5–1) and aggregate (9–3) wins in Europe (against Welsh Premier League club Rhyl).

Bohemians started their 2009–10 UEFA Champions League campaign away to Austrian Bundesliga champions Red Bull Salzburg on 16 July 2009 with a 1–1 draw in Salzburg. In the second leg on 22 July 2009, Bohemians held out until an 87th-minute goal by Patrik Ježek for Red Bull Salzburg gave them a one-nil victory on the night and two one win on aggregate. After retaining the league title in 2009, Bohs entered the Champions League again in 2010–11. They were drawn against Welsh side The New Saints in the Second Qualifying Round, and won the first leg 1–0 at Dalymount Park on 13 July 2010. They lost the second leg 4–0 and were eliminated 4–1 on aggregate. Bohs manager Pat Fenlon later labelled the performance as 'disgraceful' and said 'the players let the club, league and country down'. The result was labelled by others as the worst result in Bohs' 40-year European history.

After a nearly a decade away from continental competition, Bohs faced Hungarian opposition in the form of Fehérvár in the 2020-2021 UEFA Europa League qualifiers. The gypsies missed out by virtue of a penalty shoot-out loss, decided after a solitary one-legged affair was played, due to the Coronavirus pandemic. Bohs entered the inaugural Europa Conference League the year after and consecutively sold out their home matches with restricted capacities at Dublin's Aviva Stadium in matches with Stjarnan FC and F91 Dudelange, both home legs ending with 3-0 victories.

"Bohs" 2021 Europa Conference League Qualification campaign came to end after defeat to PAOK, when they lost the 3–2 on aggregate, following a win in the first leg at the Aviva Stadium on 3 August, when Scottish winger Ali Coote scored a brace in what has to rank as one of the best ever wins by an Irish team in Europe. The Greek side had just signed ex Dortmund and Manchester United star Shinji Kagawa and had a budget of circa €75M compared to the Bohemian's estimated €750,000. In advance of the match, Bohemians' fans were denied access to the Greek stadium amid protests from the home fans about Covid restrictions. On 12 August, the club's European campaign came to an end following a 2–0 defeat in Thessalonika.

=== Overview ===
| Competition | P | W | D | L | GF | GA |
|---|---|---|---|---|---|---|
| European Cup / UEFA Champions League | 18 | 4 | 4 | 10 | 13 | 29 |
| UEFA Cup / UEFA Europa League | 31 | 3 | 10 | 18 | 17 | 57 |
| UEFA Europa Conference League | 6 | 4 | 1 | 1 | 10 | 4 |
| European Cup Winners' Cup | 8 | 2 | 2 | 4 | 6 | 13 |
| UEFA Intertoto Cup | 10 | 4 | 0 | 6 | 15 | 20 |
| TOTAL | 73 | 17 | 17 | 39 | 61 | 123 |

=== Matches ===
| Season | Competition | Round | Opponent | Home | Away | Aggregate |
|---|---|---|---|---|---|---|
| 1970–71 | European Cup Winners' Cup | PR | (Czechoslovakia) Gottwaldov | 1–2 | 2–2 | 3–4 |
| 1972–73 | UEFA Cup | 1R | (Germany) 1. FC Köln | 1–2 | 0–3 | 1–5 |
| 1974–75 | UEFA Cup | 1R | (Germany) Hamburg | 0–3 | 0–1 | 0–4 |
| 1975–76 | European Cup | 1R | (Scotland) Rangers | 1–4 | 1–1 | 2–5 |
| 1976–77 | European Cup Winners' Cup | 1R | (Denmark) Esbjerg | 2–1 | 1–0 | 3–1 |
| 1976–77 | European Cup Winners' Cup | 2R | (Poland) Śląsk Wrocław | 0–3 | 0–1 | 0–4 |
| 1977–78 | UEFA Cup | 1R | (England) Newcastle United | 0–0 | 0–4 | 0–4 |
| 1978–79 | European Cup | 1R | (Cyprus) Omonia | 1–2 | 1–0 | 2–2 (a) |
| 1978–79 | European Cup | 2R | (East Germany) Dynamo Dresden | 0–0 | 0–6 | 0–6 |
| 1979–80 | UEFA Cup | 1R | (Portugal) Sporting CP | 0–2 | 0–0 | 0–2 |
| 1984–85 | UEFA Cup | 1R | (Scotland) Rangers | 3–2 | 0–2 | 3–4 |
| 1985–86 | UEFA Cup | 1R | (Scotland) Dundee United | 2–5 | 2–2 | 4–7 |
| 1987–88 | UEFA Cup | 1R | (Scotland) Aberdeen | 0–0 | 0–1 | 0–1 |
| 1992–93 | European Cup Winners' Cup | 1R | (Romania) Steaua București | 0–0 | 0–4 | 0–4 |
| 1993–94 | UEFA Cup | 1R | (France) Bordeaux | 0–1 | 0–5 | 0–6 |
| 1995 | UEFA Intertoto Cup | Group 5 | (Denmark) Odense BK | 0–2 | —N/a | 5th |
| 1995 | UEFA Intertoto Cup | Group 5 | (Finland) HJK | —N/a | 2–3 | 5th |
| 1995 | UEFA Intertoto Cup | Group 5 | (France) Bordeaux | 0–2 | —N/a | 5th |
| 1995 | UEFA Intertoto Cup | Group 5 | (Sweden) Norrköping | —N/a | 0–5 | 5th |
| 1996–97 | UEFA Cup | PR | (Belarus) Dinamo Minsk | 1–1 | 0–0 | 1–1 (a) |
| 1997–98 | UEFA Cup | 1QR | (Hungary) Ferencváros | 0–1 | 0–5 | 0–6 |
| 2000–01 | UEFA Cup | QR | (Scotland) Aberdeen | 0–1 | 2–1 | 2–2 (a) |
| 2000–01 | UEFA Cup | 1R | (Germany) Kaiserslautern | 1–3 | 1–0 | 2–3 |
| 2001–02 | UEFA Champions League | 1QR | (Estonia) Levadia Maardu | 3–0 | 0–0 | 3–0 |
| 2001–02 | UEFA Champions League | 2QR | (Sweden) Halmstads BK | 1–2 | 0–2 | 1–4 |
| 2003–04 | UEFA Champions League | 1QR | (Belarus) BATE Borisov | 0–1 | 3–0 | 3–1 |
| 2003–04 | UEFA Champions League | 2QR | (Norway) Rosenborg | 0–1 | 0–4 | 0–5 |
| 2004–05 | UEFA Cup | 1QR | (Estonia) Levadia Tallinn | 0–0 | 1–3 | 1–3 |
| 2005 | UEFA Intertoto Cup | 1R | (Belgium) Gent | 1–0 | 1–3 | 2–3 |
| 2008 | UEFA Intertoto Cup | 1R | (Wales) Rhyl | 5–1 | 4–2 | 9–3 |
| 2008 | UEFA Intertoto Cup | 2R | (Latvia) FK Rīga | 0–1 | 2–1 | 2–2 (a) |
| 2009–10 | UEFA Champions League | 2QR | (Austria) Red Bull Salzburg | 1–1 | 0–1 | 1–2 |
| 2010–11 | UEFA Champions League | 2QR | (Wales) The New Saints | 1–0 | 0–4 | 1–4 |
| 2011–12 | UEFA Europa League | 2QR | (Slovenia) Olimpija Ljubljana | 0–2 | 1–1 | 1–3 |
| 2012–13 | UEFA Europa League | 1QR | (Iceland) Þór Akureyri | 0–0 | 1–5 | 1–5 |
| 2020–21 | UEFA Europa League | 1QR | (Hungary) Fehérvár | —N/a | 1–1 (p) | —N/a |
| 2021–22 | UEFA Europa Conference League | 1QR | (Iceland) Stjarnan | 3–0 | 1–1 | 4–1 |
| 2021–22 | UEFA Europa Conference League | 2QR | (Luxembourg) F91 Dudelange | 3–0 | 1–0 | 4–0 |
| 2021–22 | UEFA Europa Conference League | 3QR | (Greece) PAOK | 2–1 | 0–2 | 2–3 |
| 2026–27 | UEFA Conference League | 1QR | (Gibraltar) St Joseph's | 2–0 | 0–0 | 2–0 |
| 2026–27 | UEFA Conference League | 2QR | (Kosovo) Ballkani | 2–1 | 2–3 | 4–4 (p) |
| 2026–27 | UEFA Conference League | 3QR | (Denmark) Midtjylland | 0–2 | 2–3 | 2–5 |

== Club culture ==
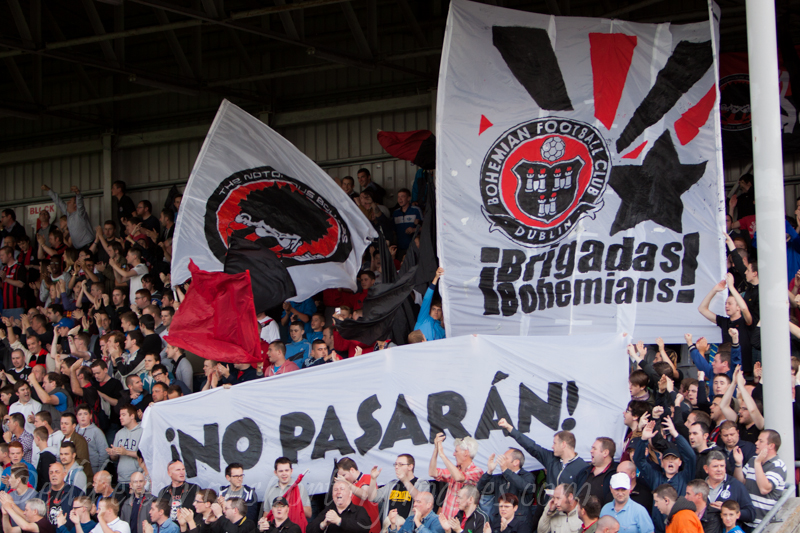
Bohemian supporters in 2013 waving banners, including one bearing the No pasarán slogan made popular by Republicans during the Spanish Civil War.

Since the 2010s, Bohemians have adopted a left-wing political identity, integrating this into their branding, public messaging, and community work. Under the leadership of Chief Operating Officer Daniel Lambert, the club has associated itself with causes such as Palestinian nationalism and anti-racism as well as LGBT, refugee and homelessness advocacy. These themes have appeared on club merchandise and in formal partnerships with organisations including Focus Ireland and Amnesty International. The club’s stated aim has been to position itself as a community-oriented institution with values that reflect broader social concerns.

This approach draws direct inspiration from FC St Pauli in Germany, a club known for its left-wing political stance and anti-fascist identity. Bohemians has incorporated similar elements into its culture, including symbolic imagery and public statements that reflect socialist or anti-establishment viewpoints. The club offices in Phibsborough contain political items such as a statue of Lenin and leftist literature, reinforcing the ideological branding.

The club's political stance has attracted both support and criticism. Supporters of the approach argue it strengthens community ties and offers a distinct identity in Irish football. Critics such as former manager Roddy Collins have stated they feel that Bohemians has become more focused on politics than on-the-pitch success, while Daniel Lambert has acknowledged that some other clubs view Bohemians as being reliant on "gimmicks" and being a "Hipster club" to attract support.

"Hold Me Now" by Johnny Logan is considered an anthem by the club and is played during the team's home games at Dalymount; Logan himself is a supporter of the club.

=== Supporters and rivalries ===
Bohs' fan base is mainly drawn from the northside of Dublin and their supporters share a bitter rivalry with Southside club, Shamrock Rovers. However, the club has many fans from other parts of the city, across Ireland and worldwide. The club shares a rivalry with their Northside neighbours Shelbourne largely because of geographical proximity as both clubs are now located roughly just 1 mile apart, and also because they featured prominently in the early days of Dublin football, when nationwide football was still based around Belfast. Shelbourne and Bohs were often featured in the Belfast-centered Irish Football League before partition and the rivalry was kept on-off after they formed the new Irish Free State league with six other clubs.

During 2006, a number of Bohemians fans formed an ultra group in an effort to create a more interesting atmosphere at home games. Named The Notorious Boo-Boys, the group bought flags and organised displays during games to lift the atmosphere of the home of Irish football Dalymount Park. The fans have friendly contacts with Prague club Bohemians 1905, Welsh club Wrexham AFC, Swedish club Malmö FF as well as English non-league and fellow supporter owned club FC United of Manchester.

The club boasts some well known supporters such as Johnny Logan, Samuel L. Jackson, Aslan's Christy Dignam, alternative band Royseven, post-punk band Fontaines D.C., as well as musicians Brush Shiels, Rob Smith and novelist Irvine Welsh. The club also has a working relationship with Hibernian FC of Edinburgh.

=== Collaborative kits ===
Since the 2010s, Bohemians have regularly released jerseys that combine distinctive designs with cultural, social, and charitable collaborations, significantly boosting the club’s revenue. In 2021, the club released a limited edition jersey in collaboration with Fontaines DC, with a portion of profits donated to charity. In 2022, a Bob Marley-themed shirt was issued in partnership with the Movement of Asylum Seekers in Ireland (MASI) and Amnesty International, later officially sanctioned by Marley’s estate. In 2023, a second Fontaines DC shirt was released, raising funds for Medical Aid for Palestinians. In April 2024, Bohemians unveiled a jersey in partnership with the Irish Congress of Trade Unions (ICTU) to promote the "Better in a trade union" campaign. In 2025, the club continued this strategy with multiple releases: a Dublin Bus-themed jersey for the FAI Cup, a collaboration with Dublin-born DJ Annie Mac, and a 2025 FAI Cup shirt in partnership with Oasis. The Oasis shirt was promoted with a video featuring Paul Weller and WWE star Sami Zayn, generating international attention. Proceeds from the jerseys were split between the club and charities, including Music Generation Ireland and Irish Community Care Manchester. These initiatives helped Bohemians increase merchandise revenue from around €100,000 in the mid-2010s to over €2 million by 2025, with sales reaching an international audience across more than 50 countries. Between 2014 and 2022, Bohemians increased their jersey sales 3,300%.

In December 2025, political activist Greta Thunberg spoke at a Bohemians event in Dublin in support of Gaza, alongside Dr Mohammed Abu Mughessib of Médecins Sans Frontières and activist Caoimhe Butterly. Thunberg had previously worn a Bohemians x Fontaines DC jersey, the profits of which raise funds for Medical Aid for Palestinians. At the event, the club also launched a collaborative jersey with pro-Palestinian rap group Kneecap, managed by COO Dan Lambert, with proceeds supporting a West Bank refugee camp. All event proceeds went to Grassroots Winter Aid for Gaza families.

Bohemian FC has faced criticism over merchandise releases that some observers have deemed politically or culturally insensitive. In March 2023, Bohemian FC used a photo of Jeremy Corbyn wearing a Palestine-themed away jersey in promotional material; former Minister Alan Shatter criticised this and noted that Corbyn had been recently suspended from the UK Labour Party following a report on anti-Semitism. In December 2025, the club released a t-shirt incorporating the Irish republican slogan "Tiocfaidh ár lá" as part of its streetwear line, with the phrase printed on the back and the club name on the front. MEP Aodhán Ó Ríordáin questioned the club’s use of the slogan and stated that it wouldn't be acceptable if a club in Northern Ireland used Loyalist slogans like "No Surrender", so the use of "Tiocfaidh ár lá" shouldn't be accepted either.

As of 2026, sales of Bohemians jerseys far outstrip those of other League of Ireland clubs and generate the club a major source of revenue not easily accessible to their competitors.

== Women ==
On 27 November 2018, Bohemians were accepted to the Under-17 Women's National League beginning with the 2019 season. The aim was to grow the number of women in the club and eventually compete in the Women's National League. The historic first game in the Under-17 Women's National League for Bohemians was played on 13 April 2019 against Cork City and ended in 0–2 defeat.

Just one year after being accepted to compete in the Under-17 Women's National League, Bohemians was accepted to the Women's National League on 18 February 2020. The first match was originally scheduled for 15 March 2020, however, the team was made to wait until 8 August 2020 due to the COVID-19 pandemic in the Republic of Ireland which delayed the start of the season. The game ended in a 4–1 defeat to Wexford Youths. Chloe Darby scored the consolation goal and wrote herself into the history books as Bohemians' first-ever female goalscorer.

== Bohemians Academy ==
Bohemians compete in the League of Ireland National Underage Leagues at all available age groups. Their academy section consists of six teams: Men's Under-20, Under-17, Under-15 and Under-14 for boys, Women's Under-19 and the Under-17 age group for girls.

Beyond their national underage teams, Bohemians have over 500 boys and girls playing across 25 teams competing in the Dublin and District Schoolboys'/Girls' League (DDSL), the North Dublin Schoolboys/Girls League (NDSL) and the Metropolitan Girls League (MGL).

=== Academy Staff ===
| Position | Staff |
|---|---|
| Head of Academy | (Republic of Ireland) Trevor Croly |
| MU20 Head Coach | (Republic of Ireland) Trevor Croly |
| WU19 Head Coach | (Republic of Ireland) Gavin Hughes |
| MU17 Coach | (Republic of Ireland) Daryl Farrelly |
| MU17 Coach | (Republic of Ireland) Derek Kavanagh |
| WU17 Coach | (Republic of Ireland) Ger Rowe |
| WU17 Coach | (Republic of Ireland) Aodhan Kennedy |
| MU15 Head Coach | (Republic of Ireland) Paul Donnelly |
| MU14 Head Coach | (Republic of Ireland) Ray Scully |
| Academy Development Coach | (Republic of Ireland) Gary Deegan |
| Academy GK Coach | (Republic of Ireland) Chris Bennion |

=== Bohemian Futsal ===
Bohemian Futsal compete in the AUL Futsal Premier Division, the winners of which compete in the UEFA Futsal Champions League preliminary rounds. Bohs also have a 'B' team that compete in the AUL Futsal Division One. They are the only League of Ireland club with a futsal club.

== Training Ground and DCU partnership ==
In 2021, Dublin City University and Bohemians agreed an 18-year multi-faceted partnership involving football, social inclusion, social outreach and academic programme collaboration. As part of the arrangement, DCU Sports Campus became Bohemians' training base and Bohemians committed to invest around €1.5 million into the facility. The training complex has four full-sized grass pitches, one all-weather artificial turf pitch and a high performance gym. Future development plans include a second artificial turf pitch, club offices for academy and team staff, player meeting rooms, a physio room and a kit room.

== Players ==
=== First Team Squad ===
As of 21 November 2026

Note: Flags indicate national team as defined under FIFA eligibility rules; some limited exceptions apply. Players may hold more than one non-FIFA nationality.

| No. | Pos. | Nation | Player |
|---|---|---|---|
| 3 | DF | IRL | Ryan Burke |
| 5 | MF | ENG | Sadou Diallo |
| 6 | MF | ENG | Jordan Flores |
| 7 | MF | ENG | Connor Parsons |
| 8 | MF | IRL | Harry Vaughan |
| 9 | FW | IRL | Colm Whelan |
| 10 | MF | IRL | Dawson Devoy |
| 11 | MF | IRL | Dayle Rooney |
| 12 | MF | USA | Patrick Hickey |
| 14 | MF | IRL | James McManus |
| 16 | DF | IRL | Darragh Power |
| 17 | MF | IRL | Adam McDonnell |
| 18 | FW | ENG | Douglas James-Taylor |
| 20 | DF | IRL | Leigh Kavanagh |
| 21 | MF | SCO | Josh Adam |

| No. | Pos. | Nation | Player |
|---|---|---|---|
| 22 | DF | IRL | Sam Todd |
| 23 | MF | ENG | Zane Myers |
| 24 | DF | IRL | Cian Byrne |
| 26 | MF | IRL | Ross Tierney |
| 27 | MF | IRL | Curtis Egan |
| 28 | FW | IRL | Hugh Martin |
| 30 | GK | NIR | Finn McDonnell |
| 31 | DF | IRL | Declan Osagie |
| 32 | MF | LAT | Markuss Strods |
| 33 | MF | IRL | Christopher Conlon |
| 41 | FW | IRL | Paddy Madden |
| — | MF | KEN | Clarke Oduor |
| — | MF | IRL | Jad Hakiki |
| — | GK | ENG | Sam Sargeant |

==== Out on loan ====
Note: Flags indicate national team as defined under FIFA eligibility rules; some limited exceptions apply. Players may hold more than one non-FIFA nationality.

| No. | Pos. | Nation | Player |
|---|---|---|---|
| 19 | MF | IRL | Rhys Brennan (on loan at Linfield) |

==== Captains ====
| Dates | Name |
|---|---|
| 2012–2013 | (Republic of Ireland) Owen Heary |
| 2014 | (Republic of Ireland) Dave Mulcahy |
| 2015–2019 | (Republic of Ireland) Derek Pender |
| 2020–2021 | (Republic of Ireland) Keith Buckley |
| 2022 | (Republic of Ireland) Conor Levingston |
| 2023–2025 | (Republic of Ireland) Keith Buckley |
| 2026 | (Republic of Ireland) Dawson Devoy |

==== Player of the Year ====
Bohemian's Player of the Year award is voted for by the club's supporters at the end of every season.

| Year | Winner |
|---|---|
| 2014 | (Republic of Ireland) Derek Pender |
| 2015 | (Cape Verde) Roberto Lopes |
| 2016 | (Republic of Ireland) Keith Buckley |
| 2017 | (Nigeria) Fuad Sule |
| 2018 | (Republic of Ireland) Shane Supple |
| 2019 | (Republic of Ireland) James Talbot |
| 2020 | (Republic of Ireland) Danny Grant |
| 2021 | (Republic of Ireland) Georgie Kelly |
| 2022 | (Republic of Ireland) Jordan Doherty |
| 2023 | (Republic of Ireland) James Clarke |
| 2024 | (Poland) Kacper Chorążka |
| 2025 | (Republic of Ireland) Dawson Devoy |
| 2026 | (Republic of Ireland) Ross Tierney |

== Technical staff ==
As of 18 November 2026

| Position | Staff |
|---|---|
| Manager | Alan Reynolds |
| Assistant Coach | |
| Coach | Derek Pender |
| Academy Manager | Trevor Croly |
| Goalkeeping Coach | Sean Fogarty |
| Strength & Conditioning Coach | Stephen Lawlor |
| Head Physio | Danny Miller |
| Equipment and Logistics Manager | Colin O'Connor |
| Kitman | Aaron Fitzsimons |

== Honours ==
- League of Ireland/Premier Division 11:
  - 1923–24, 1927–28, 1929–30, 1933–34, 1935–36, 1974–75, 1977–78, 2000–01, 2002–03, 2008, 2009
- FAI Cup 7:
  - 1927–28, 1934–35, 1969–70, 1975–76, 1991–92, 2000–01, 2008
- Irish Cup: 1
  - 1907–08
- League of Ireland Cup: 3
  - 1974–75, 1978–79, 2009
- League of Ireland Shield: 6
  - 1923–24, 1927–28, 1928–29, 1933–34, 1938–39, 1939–40
- Setanta Sports Cup: 1
  - 2010
- LFA President's Cup: 13
  - 1965–66, 1967–68, 1974–75, 1975–76, 1976–77, 1977–78, 1978–79, 1982–83, 1992–93, 1994–95, 1997–98, 2000–01, 2001–02
- Dublin City Cup: 1
  - 1935–36
- Dublin and Belfast Inter-City Cup: 1
  - 1944–45
- Top Four Cup: 1
  - 1971–72
- Aciéries d'Angleur Trophy: 1
  - 1929
- Leinster Senior League: 8
  - 1899–1900, 1900–01, 1901–02, 1904–05, 1912–13, 1913–14, 1917–18, 1931–32
- Leinster Senior Cup: 33 (record)
  - 1893–94, 1894–95, 1895–96, 1896–97, 1897–98, 1898–99, 1901–02, 1902–03, 1904–05, 1906–07, 1909–10, 1910–11, 1911–12, 1914–15, 1915–16, 1925–26, 1927–28, 1939–40, 1946–47, 1965–66, 1966–67, 1972–73, 1974–75, 1975–76, 1978–79, 1979–80, 1983–84, 1985–86, 1988–89, 1992–93, 1997–98, 2015–16, 2022–23
- FAI Intermediate Cup: 1
  - 1931–32
- FAI Youth Cup
  - 1969–70, 2001–02, 2014–15: 3

== Records ==
Bohs' previous crest

=== Wins ===
- Biggest win: 11–0 versus Grangegorman in the Leinster Senior Cup final, 26 December 1946
- Biggest FAI Cup win: 9–0 versus Tramore Rookies at home in the first round, 14 January 1934
- Biggest League of Ireland win: 10–1 versus University College Dublin at home, 16 August 2019
- Biggest League of Ireland Cup win: 6–0 versus Monaghan United at home, 3 September 1987

=== League ===
- Biggest league victory: 10–1 (h) vs. University College Dublin, 16 August 2019
- Biggest league defeat: 0–7 (a) vs. Shamrock Rovers, 5 February 1955
- Most league points in a season:
  - 33-game league
    - 85 points in 2008 (record total and 19-point record margin)
- Most league goals in a season:
  - 30-game league
    - 74 goals in 1977–78
- All-time league appearances: Tommy Kelly – 358 matches
- All-time league top scorer: Glen Crowe – 133 goals

=== Other ===
- Record Leinster Senior Cup Victory 11–0 v Grangegorman (26 December 1946) (Leinster Senior Cup Final)
- League defeat (professional era): 0–5 v St Patrick's Athletic, 6 December 1996
- Record League Goal scorer in one Season Glen Crowe – 25 goals in 2000–01
- Most appearances (player): 575, Tommy Kelly
- Most goals (player): 192, Turlough O'Connor
- Youngest Player: Evan Ferguson – 14 years 337 days (vs. Derry City in the League of Ireland Premier Division, 20 September 2019)
- Oldest player: 40, Gary Matthews
- First goalscorer: Joseph Whelan v Britannia, 1 November 1890
- Quickest Red Card: Gareth Fleming 8 minutes v St Patricks Athletic, 2001

=== League of Ireland Placing History ===
1980s

- 1985–86: LOI Premier Division 4th of 12
- 1986–87: LOI Premier Division 3rd of 12
- 1987–88: LOI Premier Division 3rd of 12
- 1988–89: LOI Premier Division 5th of 12
- 1989–90: LOI Premier Division 6th of 12

1990s

- 1990–91: LOI Premier Division 9th of 12
- 1991–92: LOI Premier Division 5th of 12
- 1992–93: LOI Premier Division 1st of 12
- 1993–94: LOI Premier Division 6th of 12
- 1994–95: LOI Premier Division 4th of 12
- 1995–96: LOI Premier Division 2nd of 12
- 1996–97: LOI Premier Division 2nd of 12
- 1997–98: LOI Premier Division 5th of 12
- 1998–99: LOI Premier Division 10th of 12
- 1999–2000: LOI Premier Division 3rd of 12

2000s

- 2000–01: LOI Premier Division 1st of 12 C
- 2001–02: LOI Premier Division 4th of 12
- 2002–03: LOI Premier Division 1st of 10 C
- 2003: LOI Premier Division 2nd of 10
- 2004: LOI Premier Division 3rd of 10
- 2005: LOI Premier Division 6th of 12
- 2006: LOI Premier Division 9th of 12
- 2007: LOI Premier Division 3rd of 12
- 2008: LOI Premier Division 1st of 12 C
- 2009: LOI Premier Division 1st of 10 C

2010s

- 2010: LOI Premier Division 2nd of 10
- 2011: LOI Premier Division 5th of 10
- 2012: LOI Premier Division 7th of 12
- 2013: LOI Premier Division 10th of 12
- 2014: LOI Premier Division 7th of 12
- 2015: LOI Premier Division 5th of 12
- 2016: LOI Premier Division 8th of 12
- 2017: LOI Premier Division 5th of 12
- 2018: LOI Premier Division 6th of 10
- 2019: LOI Premier Division 3rd of 10

2020s

- 2020: LOI Premier Division 2nd of 10
- 2021: LOI Premier Division 5th of 10
- 2022: LOI Premier Division 6th of 10
- 2023: LOI Premier Division 6th of 10
- 2024: LOI Premier Division 8th of 10
- 2025: LOI Premier Division 4th of 10

== Managerial history ==
- (Republic of Ireland) Seán Thomas (1964–67)
- (Republic of Ireland) Pat Murphy (May 1967 – April 68)
- (Republic of Ireland) Seán Thomas (1968–73)
- (Republic of Ireland) Billy Young (1973–89)
- (Republic of Ireland) Padraig O'Connor (1989–90)
- (Republic of Ireland) Eamonn Gregg (1990–93)
- (Republic of Ireland) Turlough O'Connor (1993–98)
- (Republic of Ireland) Joe McGrath (1998)
- (Republic of Ireland) Roddy Collins (1998–01)
- (Republic of Ireland) Pete Mahon (2001)
- (Republic of Ireland) Stephen Kenny (2001–04)
- (Republic of Ireland) Gareth Farrelly (2004–06)
- (Northern Ireland) Sean Connor (17 Nov 2006 – 19 Dec 2007)
- (Republic of Ireland) Pat Fenlon (22 Dec 2007 – 25 Nov 2011)
- (Republic of Ireland) Aaron Callaghan (1 Jan 2012 – 15 July 2013)
- (Republic of Ireland) Owen Heary (interim) (16 July 2013 – Sept 12, 2013)
- (Republic of Ireland) Bobby Browne (Sep 2013 – Nov 2013)
- (Republic of Ireland) Owen Heary (Jan 2014 – Nov 2014)
- (Republic of Ireland) Keith Long (Nov 2014 – Aug 2022)
- (Republic of Ireland) Derek Pender (interim) (Aug 2022 – Oct 2022)
- (Northern Ireland) Declan Devine (Oct 2022 – March 2024)
- (Republic of Ireland) Derek Pender (interim) (March 2024)
- (Republic of Ireland) Alan Reynolds (March 2024 – present)
