= List of Republic of Ireland international footballers =

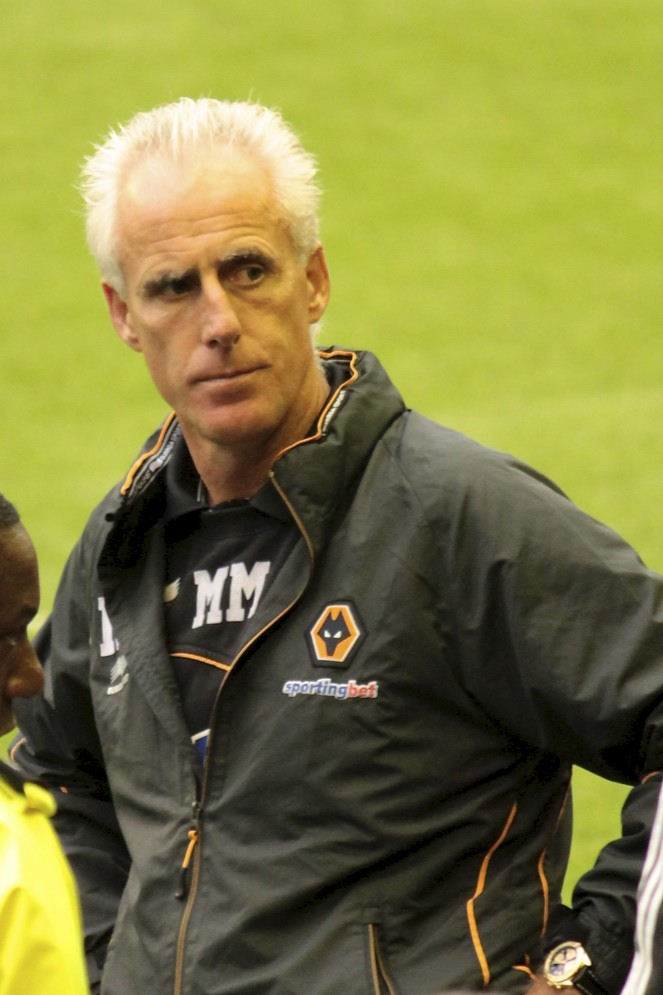
Mick McCarthy played 57 times for the Republic of Ireland and later managed the team.

This is a list of footballers who have played for the Republic of Ireland national football team. The Irish Football Association (IFA) was formed in 1880, prior to the partition of Ireland. The original Ireland national team was selected by the IFA and included players from all of Ireland. Following the creation of the Irish Free State, the Football Association of Ireland (FAI) was set up and it picked its own national team. Until 1950, both Irish associations picked players from the whole of the island, which resulted in there being several 'dual internationals' (33 originating from the territory of the Irish Republic and six from the territory of Northern Ireland). After complaints by the FAI against this practice being used by the IFA during 1950 FIFA World Cup qualification matches, FIFA decreed that each association should select teams based on their own part of Ireland, and the IFA team became known as Northern Ireland from then on.

During the 1958 FIFA World Cup qualification, a late goal by England allowed them to qualify at Ireland's expense. After reaching the quarter-finals of the 1964 European Nations' Cup, Ireland lost a 1966 FIFA World Cup qualification play-off against Spain. A run of poor results in the late 1960s and early 1970s followed until Johnny Giles became their first player-manager. This was followed by the debut of a young Liam Brady and results improved markedly. The side missed out on the 1978 FIFA World Cup by two points, having defeated France at home during qualification. Eoin Hand took over as manager for the 1982 FIFA World Cup qualifiers. Ireland again narrowly missed out on qualification, finishing behind France on goal difference. Disappointing qualifying campaigns for both UEFA Euro 1984 and the 1986 FIFA World Cup followed, ending Hand's time in charge.

Ireland then appointed Jack Charlton, who led the team to its most successful period, qualifying for two World Cups and a European Championship. Ireland's first appearance at a major finals tournament came in UEFA Euro 1988. Ireland beat England 1–0 and came within eight minutes of qualifying for the semi-finals. Ireland also qualified for the 1990 FIFA World Cup. Draws in the group stage against England, Egypt and the Netherlands was enough to earn a place in the second round, in which the team beat Romania on a penalty shootout. Ireland were then beaten 1–0 by Italy in the quarter-final. During the tournament, the team had an audience with Pope John Paul II. After missing out on UEFA Euro 1992 despite being unbeaten in qualifying, Ireland qualified for the 1994 FIFA World Cup. The team beat Italy 1–0 in their opening game and reached the second round, losing 2–0 to the Netherlands. Ireland missed out on UEFA Euro 1996 after losing 2–0 to the Netherlands in a play-off at Anfield. It was Charlton's final game as manager.

Under new manager Mick McCarthy, Ireland missed out on the next two major tournaments, losing play-offs to Belgium and Turkey. Ireland took on Portugal and the Netherlands in 2002 FIFA World Cup qualification and ended the group in second place. Ireland then qualified for the World Cup by winning a play-off with Iran. Despite the loss of captain Roy Keane due to an infamous public spat in Saipan, the team progressed to the second round. After the match was drawn, Ireland lost 3–2 in a penalty shootout against Spain. After a poor start to qualifying for UEFA Euro 2004, McCarthy was replaced by Brian Kerr. He was unable to guide the side to Euro 2004 or the 2006 FIFA World Cup and was sacked in October 2005. Kerr was replaced by Steve Staunton in January 2006, but the team failed to qualify for UEFA Euro 2008 and Staunton lost the position in October 2007.

Veteran Italian coach Giovanni Trapattoni was appointed manager in February 2008. Trapattoni went through all ten first round 2010 FIFA World Cup qualifying games unbeaten, winning four of the ten games. Ireland lost out on a place in the World Cup after a controversial loss to France in the play-offs. In their Euro 2012 qualifying group Ireland finished second and qualified by winning a play-off against Estonia. Ireland lost all three matches at Euro 2012, against Croatia, Spain and Italy. They next qualified for a major tournament at UEFA Euro 2016 under manager Martin O'Neill, drawing with Sweden and losing to Belgium before beating Italy to qualify for the Round of 16, where they took an early lead against hosts France were eliminated 2–1.

With the Good Friday agreement of 1998 confirming that citizens of Northern Ireland could self-identify as British, Irish or both, a small number of players from that territory have been selected for the FAI team; however, the vast majority of players born outside the Republic of Ireland have been recruited from the large Irish diaspora in Great Britain.

== Key ==
	2026 caps awarded for the national team
	2025 caps awarded for the national team
	2024 caps awarded for the national team
Caps	Appearances

Pos	Positions
GK	Goalkeeper
DF	Defender
MF	Midfielder
FW	Forward

== A ==
As of 22:41, 29 September 2026 (UTC)

Player	Pos.	Caps	Goals	Debut		Last or most recent match		Ref.
Player	Pos.	Caps	Goals	Date	Opponent	Date	Opponent	Ref.
James Abankwah	DF	6	0	31 March 2026	North Macedonia	27 September 2026	Israel	
Tayo Adaramola	DF	1	0	16 May 2026	Grenada	16 May 2026	Grenada	
Tom Aherne	DF	16	0	16 June 1946	Portugal	4 October 1953	France	
John Aldridge	FW	69	19	26 March 1986	Wales	9 October 1996	Macedonia	
Millenic Alli	FW	1	0	16 May 2026	Grenada	16 May 2026	Grenada	
Paddy Ambrose	FW	5	1	7 November 1954	Norway	24 May 1964	England	
John Anderson	DF	16	1	26 October 1979	Czechoslovakia	19 October 1988	Tunisia	
Keith Andrews	MF	35	3	19 November 2008	Poland	14 November 2012	Greece	
Paddy Andrews	DF	1	0	8 December 1935	Netherlands	8 December 1935	Netherlands	
Sinclair Armstrong	FW	1	0	10 September 2023	Netherlands	10 September 2023	Netherlands	
Tom Arrigan	DF	1	0	7 November 1937	Norway	7 November 1937	Norway	
Harry Arter	MF	19	0	7 June 2015	England	12 October 2021	Qatar	
Finn Azaz	MF	15	1	26 March 2024	Switzerland	24 September 2026	Kosovo	

== B ==
As of 22:46, 29 September 2026 (UTC)

Player	Pos.	Caps	Goals	Debut		Last or most recent match		Ref.
Player	Pos.	Caps	Goals	Date	Opponent	Date	Opponent	Ref.
Phil Babb	DF	35	0	23 March 1994	Russia	7 September 2002	Russia	
Joel Bagan	DF	1	0	27 September 2026	Israel	27 September 2026	Israel	
Eddie Bailham	FW	1	0	24 May 1964	England	24 May 1964	England	
Eric Barber	FW	2	0	27 October 1965	Spain	25 May 1966	Belgium	
Graham Barrett	FW	6	2	21 August 2002	Finland	16 November 2004	Croatia	
Paddy Barry	FW	2	0	12 February 1928	Belgium	20 April 1929	Belgium	
Gavin Bazunu	GK	22	0	27 March 2021	Luxembourg	26 March 2024	Switzerland	
Jim Beglin	DF	15	0	3 June 1984	China	12 November 1986	Scotland	
Alan Bennett	DF	2	0	23 May 2007	Ecuador	26 May 2007	Bolivia	
Jimmy Bermingham	FW	1	0	20 April 1929	Belgium	20 April 1929	Belgium	
Paddy Bermingham	DF	1	1	16 December 1934	Hungary	16 December 1934	Hungary	
Leon Best	FW	7	0	29 May 2009	Nigeria	2 March 2010	Brazil	
Packie Bonner	GK	81	0	24 May 1981	Poland	15 June 1996	Bolivia	
Andy Boyle	DF	1	0	28 March 2017	Iceland	28 March 2017	Iceland	
Synan Braddish	MF	2	0	5 April 1978	Turkey	12 April 1978	Poland	
Paddy Bradshaw	FW	5	4	18 September 1938	Switzerland	23 May 1939	Germany	
Frank Brady, Sr.	DF	2	0	21 March 1926	Italy	23 April 1927	Italy	
Liam Brady	MF	72	9	30 October 1974	Soviet Union	6 May 1990	Finland	
Ray Brady	DF	6	0	25 September 1963	Austria	13 May 1964	Norway	
Robbie Brady	MF	73	10	11 September 2012	Oman	26 March 2026	Czech Republic	
Keith Branagan	GK	1	0	11 February 1997	Wales	1 February 1997	Wales	
Gary Breen	DF	63	6	29 May 1996	Portugal	24 May 2006	Chile	
Tommy Breen	GK	5	0	17 May 1937	Switzerland	4 May 1947	Portugal	
Adam Brennan	MF	1	0	5 June 2026	Canada	5 June 2026	Canada	
Fran Brennan	DF	1	0	24 March 1965	Belgium	24 March 1965	Belgium	
Shay Brennan	DF	19	0	5 May 1965	Spain	8 December 1970	Italy	
Jackie Brown	MF	2	1	17 May 1937	Switzerland	23 May 1937	France	
Ned Brooks	FW	1	3	14 June 1924	United States	14 June 1924	United States	
Alan Browne	DF	39	5	1 June 2017	Mexico	31 March 2026	North Macedonia	
Willie Browne	DF	3	0	25 September 1963	Austria	24 May 1964	England	
Alex Bruce	DF	2	0	23 May 2007	Ecuador	19 November 2008	Poland	
Liam Buckley	FW	2	0	23 May 1984	Poland	8 August 1984	Mexico	
Florrie Burke	DF	1	0	17 October 1951	West Germany	17 October 1951	West Germany	
Graham Burke	MF	3	1	28 May 2018	France	11 September 2018	Poland	
John Burke	DF	1	0	20 April 1929	Belgium	20 April 1929	Belgium	
Tom Burke	DF	1	0	25 February 1934	Belgium	25 February 1934	Belgium	
Paul Butler	DF	1	0	23 February 2000	Czech Republic	23 February 2000	Czech Republic	
Thomas Butler	MF	2	0	21 August 2002	Finland	16 October 2002	Switzerland	
David Byrne	FW	3	1	20 April 1929	Belgium	25 February 1934	Belgium	
Jack Byrne	MF	4	0	10 September 2019	Bulgaria	18 November 2020	Bulgaria	
Jack Byrne	DF	1	0	12 February 1928	Belgium	12 February 1928	Belgium	
Jason Byrne	FW	2	0	28 April 2004	Poland	24 May 2006	Chile	
John Byrne	FW	23	4	5 February 1985	Italy	17 February 1993	Luxembourg	
Paddy Byrne	DF	3	0	26 April 1931	Spain	8 April 1934	Netherlands	
Pat Byrne	MF	8	0	23 May 1984	Poland	27 May 1986	Czechoslovakia	
Sean Byrne	DF	1	0	26 April 1931	Spain	26 April 1931	Spain	
Tony Byrne	DF	14	0	15 October 1969	Denmark	21 October 1973	Poland	

== C ==
As of 22:54, 29 September 2026 (UTC)

Player	Pos.	Caps	Goals	Debut		Last or most recent match		Ref.
Player	Pos.	Caps	Goals	Date	Opponent	Date	Opponent	Ref.
Alan Campbell	FW	3	0	5 February 1985	Italy	26 May 1985	Spain	
Noel Campbell	MF	11	0	30 May 1971	Austria	1 June 1977	Bulgaria	
Harry Cannon	GK	2	0	21 March 1926	Italy	12 February 1928	Belgium	
Tom Cannon	FW	4	2	11 June 2024	Portugal	27 September 2026	Israel	
Noel Cantwell	DF	36	14	28 October 1953	Luxembourg	22 February 1967	Turkey	
Brian Carey	DF	3	0	29 April 1992	United States	23 March 1994	Russia	
Johnny Carey	DF	29	3	7 November 1937	Norway	25 March 1953	Austria	
Joe Carolan	DF	2	0	1 November 1959	Sweden	3 March 1960	Chile	
Stephen Carr	DF	44	0	28 April 1999	Sweden	22 August 2007	Denmark	
Brendan Carroll	FW	2	0	24 April 1949	Belgium	8 September 1949	Finland	
Tommy Carroll	DF	17	1	15 May 1968	Poland	6 June 1973	Norway	
Lee Carsley	MF	39	0	11 October 1997	Romania	6 February 2008	Brazil	
Tony Cascarino	FW	88	19	11 September 1985	Switzerland	17 November 1999	Turkey	
Jeff Chandler	MF	2	0	26 September 1979	Czechoslovakia	29 October 1979	United States	
Harry Chatton	DF	3	0	26 April 1931	Spain	8 April 1934	Netherlands	
Cyrus Christie	DF	30	2	18 November 2014	United States	8 June 2022	Ukraine	
Ciaran Clark	DF	36	2	8 February 2011	Wales	27 March 2021	Luxembourg	
Clive Clarke	DF	2	0	29 May 2004	Nigeria	3 June 2004	Jamaica	
Jerome Clarke	FW	1	0	12 April 1978	Poland	12 April 1978	Poland	
Kevin Clarke	DF	2	0	23 May 1948	Portugal	30 May 1948	Spain	
Mattie Clarke	DF	1	0	10 May 1950	Belgium	10 May 1950	Belgium	
Tommy Clinton	DF	3	0	30 May 1951	Norway	7 March 1954	Luxembourg	
Paddy Coad	MF	11	3	30 September 1946	England	1 June 1952	Spain	
Tim Coffey	MF	1	0	9 October 1949	Finland	9 October 1949	Finland	
Séamus Coleman	DF	81	1	8 February 2011	Wales	5 June 2026	Canada	
Martin Colfer	FW	2	0	10 May 1950	Belgium	30 May 1951	Norway	
Nick Colgan	GK	10	0	27 March 2002	Denmark	26 May 2007	Bolivia	
Frank Collins	GK	2	0	14 June 1924	United States	23 April 1927	Italy	
James Collins	FW	14	2	10 September 2019	Bulgaria	12 October 2021	Qatar	
Nathan Collins	DF	40	3	12 October 2021	Qatar	5 June 2026	Canada	
Ollie Conmy	MF	5	0	24 March 1965	Belgium	7 October 1969	Czechoslovakia	
Aaron Connolly	FW	9	0	12 October 2019	Georgia	7 September 2023	France	
David Connolly	FW	41	9	29 May 1996	Portugal	8 October 2005	Cyprus	
Hugh Connolly	FW	1	0	17 October 1936	Germany	17 October 1936	Germany	
Jimmy Connolly	MF	1	0	21 March 1926	Italy	21 March 1926	Italy	
Terry Conroy	FW	26	2	7 October 1969	Czechoslovakia	24 April 1977	Poland	
Jimmy Conway	MF	20	3	23 October 1966	Spain	24 April 1977	Poland	
Peter Corr	MF	4	0	22 May 1949	Portugal	13 November 1949	Sweden	
Ned Courtney	GK	1	0	16 June 1946	Portugal	16 June 1946	Portugal	
Simon Cox	FW	30	4	24 May 2011	Northern Ireland	10 June 2014	Portugal	
Owen Coyle	FW	1	0	20 April 1994	Netherlands	20 April 1994	Netherlands	
Conor Coventry	MF	5	0	13 November 2025	Portugal	27 September 2026	Israel	
Tommy Coyne	FW	22	6	25 March 1992	Switzerland	29 October 1997	Belgium	
Glen Crowe	FW	2	0	20 November 2002	Greece	30 April 2003	Norway	
Josh Cullen	MF	47	0	10 September 2019	Bulgaria	16 November 2025	Hungary	
George Cummins	MF	19	5	28 October 1953	Luxembourg	7 May 1961	Scotland	
Tim Cuneen	MF	1	0	30 May 1951	Norway	30 May 1951	Norway	
Greg Cunningham	DF	4	0	28 May 2010	Algeria	6 February 2013	Poland	
Kenny Cunningham	DF	72	0	24 April 1996	Czech Republic	12 October 2005	Switzerland	
Dermot Curtis	FW	17	8	3 October 1956	Denmark	25 September 1963	Austria	
Ronan Curtis	FW	7	0	15 November 2018	Northern Ireland	3 June 2021	Andorra	
Sean Cusack	DF	1	0	16 November 1952	France	16 November 1952	France	

== D ==
As of 23:00, 29 September 2026 (UTC)

Player	Pos.	Caps	Goals	Debut		Last or most recent match		Ref.
Player	Pos.	Caps	Goals	Date	Opponent	Date	Opponent	Ref.
Liam Daish	DF	5	0	19 February 1992	Wales	12 June 1996	Mexico	
Gerry Daly	MF	48	13	16 May 1973	Poland	15 October 1986	Scotland	
Jimmy Daly	DF	2	0	8 May 1932	Netherlands	5 May 1935	Switzerland	
Maurice Daly	DF	2	0	5 April 1978	Turkey	12 April 1978	Poland	
Pat Daly	DF	1	0	8 September 1949	Finland	8 September 1949	Finland	
Tom Davis	FW	4	4	17 October 1936	Germany	22 May 1938	Poland	
Eamonn Deacy	DF	4	0	28 April 1982	Algeria	30 May 1982	Trinidad and Tobago	
Damien Delaney	DF	9	0	24 May 2008	Serbia	25 May 2014	Turkey	
Rory Delap	MF	11	0	25 March 1998	Czech Republic	31 March 2004	Czech Republic	
Ken DeMange	MF	2	0	23 May 1987	Brazil	19 October 1988	Tunisia	
John Dempsey	DF	19	1	7 December 1966	Spain	25 June 1972	Portugal	
Miah Dennehy	MF	11	2	18 June 1972	Ecuador	24 April 1977	Poland	
Peter Desmond	FW	4	0	8 September 1949	Finland	13 November 1949	Sweden	
John Devine	DF	13	0	26 September 1979	Czechoslovakia	17 October 1984	Norway	
Dawson Devoy	MF	1	0	5 June 2026	Canada	5 June 2026	Canada	
Gary Doherty	DF	33	4	26 April 2000	Greece	12 October 2005	Switzerland	
Matt Doherty	DF	53	3	23 March 2018	Turkey	6 September 2025	Hungary	
Joey Donnelly	FW	10	3	16 December 1934	Hungary	10 October 1937	Norway	
Tommy Donnelly	FW	2	1	10 October 1937	Norway	18 September 1938	Switzerland	
Don Donovan	DF	5	0	7 November 1954	Norway	8 May 1957	England	
Terry Donovan	FW	2	0	26 September 1979	Czechoslovakia	21 September 1981	West Germany	
Jonathan Douglas	MF	8	0	28 April 2004	Poland	17 October 2007	Cyprus	
Charlie Dowdall	FW	5	0	3 June 1924	Estonia	26 April 1931	Spain	
Christy Doyle	FW	1	0	5 April 1959	Czechoslovakia	5 April 1959	Czechoslovakia	
Colin Doyle	GK	4	0	23 May 2007	Ecuador	2 June 2018	United States	
Denis Doyle	MF	1	0	21 March 1926	Italy	21 March 1926	Italy	
Kevin Doyle	FW	62	14	1 March 2006	Sweden	28 March 2017	Iceland	
Larry Doyle	DF	1	0	13 December 1931	Spain	13 December 1931	Spain	
Michael Doyle	MF	1	0	6 June 2004	Netherlands	6 June 2004	Netherlands	
Damien Duff	MF	100	8	25 March 1998	Czech Republic	18 June 2012	Italy	
Bobby Duffy	FW	1	0	10 May 1950	Belgium	10 May 1950	Belgium	
Shane Duffy	DF	61	7	6 June 2014	Costa Rica	4 June 2024	Hungary	
Harry Duggan	MF	5	1	23 April 1927	Italy	7 November 1937	Norway	
Paddy Duncan	FW	4	2	28 May 1924	Bulgaria	14 June 1924	United States	
Jimmy Dunne	FW	15	13	11 May 1930	Belgium	23 May 1939	Germany	
Jimmy Dunne	DF	1	0	30 May 1971	Austria	30 May 1971	Austria	
Jimmy Dunne	DF	3	0	23 March 2025	Bulgaria	26 March 2026	Czech Republic	
Leo Dunne	DF	2	0	5 May 1935	Switzerland	8 May 1935	Germany	
Pat Dunne	GK	5	0	5 May 1965	Spain	16 November 1966	Turkey	
Richard Dunne	DF	80	8	26 April 2000	Greece	15 October 2013	Kazakhstan	
Seamus Dunne	DF	15	0	4 October 1952	France	18 May 1960	Sweden	
Tommy Dunne	DF	3	0	10 May 1956	Netherlands	25 November 1956	West Germany	
Tony Dunne	DF	33	0	8 April 1962	Austria	29 October 1975	Turkey	
Paddy Dunning	DF	2	0	28 October 1970	Sweden	8 December 1970	Italy	
Eamon Dunphy	MF	23	0	10 November 1965	Spain	30 May 1971	Austria	
Noel Dwyer	GK	14	0	1 November 1959	Sweden	25 October 1964	Poland	
John Joe Dykes	DF	3	0	28 May 1924	Bulgaria	3 June 1924	Estonia	

== E ==
As of 23:04, 29 September 2026 (UTC)

Player	Pos.	Caps	Goals	Debut		Last or most recent match		Ref.
Player	Pos.	Caps	Goals	Date	Opponent	Date	Opponent	Ref.
Festy Ebosele	MF	13	0	7 September 2023	France	16 November 2025	Hungary	
Peter Eccles	DF	1	0	23 April 1986	Uruguay	23 April 1986	Uruguay	
John Egan	DF	39	3	28 March 2017	Iceland	24 September 2026	Kosovo	
Robert Egan	FW	1	0	20 April 1929	Belgium	20 April 1929	Belgium	
Tommy Eglington	FW	24	2	16 June 1946	Portugal	27 November 1955	Spain	
Owen Elding	FW	1	0	24 September 2026	Kosovo	24 September 2026	Kosovo	
Rob Elliot	GK	4	0	25 May 2014	Turkey	29 March 2016	Slovakia	
Stephen Elliott	FW	9	1	16 November 2004	Croatia	2 September 2006	Germany	
Plev Ellis	FW	7	3	5 May 1935	Switzerland	6 December 1936	Hungary	
Aidomo Emakhu	FW	1	0	16 May 2026	Grenada	16 May 2026	Grenada	
Mickey Evans	FW	1	0	11 October 1997	Romania	11 October 1997	Romania	

== F ==
As of 23:05, 29 September 2026 (UTC)

Player	Pos.	Caps	Goals	Debut		Last or most recent match		Ref.
Player	Pos.	Caps	Goals	Date	Opponent	Date	Opponent	Ref.
Eamonn Fagan	FW	1	0	6 June 1973	Norway	6 June 1973	Norway	
John Fagan	FW	1	0	21 March 1926	Italy	21 March 1926	Italy	
Paddy Fagan	MF	8	5	7 November 1954	Norway	7 May 1961	Scotland	
Mick Fairclough	MF	2	0	21 May 1982	Chile	30 May 1982	Trinidad and Tobago	
Sean Fallon	DF	8	2	26 November 1950	Norway	28 May 1955	West Germany	
Willie Fallon	FW	9	2	16 December 1934	Hungary	23 May 1939	Germany	
Tom Farquharson	GK	4	0	20 April 1929	Belgium	13 December 1931	Spain	
Michael Farrell	MF	3	0	28 May 1924	Bulgaria	14 June 1924	United States	
Paddy Farrell	FW	2	0	17 May 1937	Switzerland	23 May 1937	France	
Peter Farrell	MF	28	3	16 June 1946	Portugal	8 May 1957	England	
Gareth Farrelly	MF	6	0	29 May 1996	Portugal	6 June 2000	United States	
Keith Fahey	MF	16	3	25 May 2010	Paraguay	12 October 2012	Germany	
John Feenan	DF	2	0	17 May 1937	Switzerland	23 May 1937	France	
Evan Ferguson	FW	26	8	17 November 2022	Norway	14 October 2025	Armenia	
Will Ferry	DF	1	0	16 May 2026	Grenada	16 May 2026	Grenada	
Steve Finnan	DF	53	2	26 April 2000	Greece	10 September 2008	Montenegro	
Rory Finneran	MF	1	0	16 May 2026	Grenada	16 May 2026	Grenada	
Al Finucane	MF	11	0	22 February 1967	Turkey	10 October 1971	Austria	
Jack Fitzgerald	FW	2	0	1 May 1955	Netherlands	10 May 1956	Netherlands	
Peter Fitzgerald	FW	5	2	28 September 1960	Wales	29 October 1961	Czechoslovakia	
Kevin Fitzpatrick	GK	1	0	7 October 1969	Czechoslovakia	7 October 1969	Czechoslovakia	
Arthur Fitzsimons	MF	26	8	8 September 1949	Finland	10 May 1959	Netherlands	
Curtis Fleming	DF	10	0	24 April 1996	Czech Republic	23 May 1998	Mexico	
John Joe Flood	DF	5	1	21 March 1926	Italy	13 December 1931	Spain	
Amby Fogarty	MF	11	3	11 May 1960	West Germany	11 March 1964	Spain	
Caleb Folan	FW	7	0	15 October 2008	Cyprus	8 September 2009	South Africa	
Dominic Foley	FW	6	2	30 May 2000	Scotland	15 November 2000	Finland	
Jim Foley	GK	7	0	25 February 1934	Belgium	6 December 1936	Hungary	
Kevin Foley	DF	8	0	29 May 2009	Nigeria	7 June 2011	Italy	
Mick Foley	DF	1	0	21 March 1926	Italy	21 March 1926	Italy	
Theo Foley	DF	9	0	11 March 1964	Spain	21 May 1967	Czechoslovakia	
David Forde	GK	24	0	24 May 2011	Northern Ireland	31 May 2016	Belarus	
Tommy Foy	FW	2	0	7 November 1937	Norway	19 March 1939	Hungary	
Bob Fullam	FW	2	1	21 March 1926	Italy	23 April 1927	Italy	
Johnny Fullam	MF	11	1	6 November 1960	Norway	7 October 1969	Czechoslovakia	

== G ==
As of 23:06, 29 September 2026 (UTC)

Player	Pos.	Caps	Goals	Debut		Last or most recent match		Ref.
Player	Pos.	Caps	Goals	Date	Opponent	Date	Opponent	Ref.
Patsy Gallacher	FW	1	0	13 December 1931	Spain	13 December 1931	Spain	
Charlie Gallagher	FW	2	0	22 February 1967	Turkey	21 May 1967	Czechoslovakia	
Mike Gallagher	DF	1	0	7 March 1954	Luxembourg	7 March 1954	Luxembourg	
Tony Galvin	MF	29	1	22 September 1982	Netherlands	6 September 1989	West Germany	
Joe Gamble	MF	2	0	23 May 2007	Ecuador	26 May 2007	Bolivia	
Eddie Gannon	MF	14	0	5 December 1948	Switzerland	28 May 1955	West Germany	
Mick Gannon	DF	1	0	30 May 1971	Austria	30 May 1971	Austria	
Peadar Gaskins	DF	7	0	25 February 1934	Belgium	22 May 1938	Poland	
John Gavin	MF	7	2	8 September 1949	Finland	3 October 1956	Denmark	
Frank Ghent	FW	2	2	2 June 1924	Netherlands	3 June 1924	Estonia	
Matty Geoghegan	FW	2	2	17 October 1936	Germany	10 October 1937	Norway	
Shay Gibbons	FW	4	0	4 May 1952	West Germany	27 November 1955	Spain	
Darron Gibson	MF	26	1	22 August 2007	Denmark	31 May 2016	Belarus	
Bobby Gilbert	FW	1	0	4 May 1966	West Germany	4 May 1966	West Germany	
Chris Giles	MF	1	0	26 November 1950	Norway	26 November 1950	Norway	
Johnny Giles	MF	59	5	1 November 1959	Sweden	22 May 1979	West Germany	
Shay Given	GK	134	0	27 March 1996	Russia	31 May 2016	Belarus	
Don Givens	FW	56	19	27 May 1969	Denmark	14 October 1981	Bulgaria	
Stephen Gleeson	MF	2	0	23 May 2007	Ecuador	1 June 2017	Mexico	
William Glen	DF	8	0	23 April 1927	Italy	9 May 1936	Luxembourg	
Dessie Glynn	FW	2	1	17 October 1951	West Germany	25 May 1955	Norway	
Tommy Godwin	GK	13	0	22 May 1949	Portugal	11 May 1958	Poland	
Joseph Golding	FW	2	0	12 February 1928	Belgium	11 May 1930	Belgium	
Jon Goodman	FW	4	0	11 February 1997	Wales	21 May 1997	Liechtenstein	
Jim Goodwin	DF	1	0	22 August 2002	Finland	22 August 2002	Finland	
Bill Gorman	DF	13	0	17 March 1936	Switzerland	4 May 1947	Portugal	
Joe Grace	FW	1	0	21 March 1926	Italy	21 March 1926	Italy	
Tony Grealish	MF	45	8	24 March 1976	Norway	13 November 1985	Denmark	
Paul Green	MF	20	1	25 May 2010	Paraguay	6 June 2014	Costa Rica	
Eamonn Gregg	DF	8	0	12 April 1978	Poland	26 September 1979	Czechoslovakia	
Dick Griffiths	FW	1	0	16 December 1934	Hungary	16 December 1934	Hungary	
Ashley Grimes	DF	18	1	5 April 1978	Turkey	23 March 1988	Romania	

== H ==
As of 23:10, 29 September 2026 (UTC)

Player	Pos.	Caps	Goals	Debut		Last or most recent match		Ref.
Player	Pos.	Caps	Goals	Date	Opponent	Date	Opponent	Ref.
Alfie Hale	FW	14	2	8 April 1962	Austria	21 October 1973	Poland	
CJ Hamilton	FW	1	0	8 June 2022	Ukraine	8 June 2022	Ukraine	
Tommy Hamilton	FW	2	0	5 April 1959	Czechoslovakia	10 May 1959	Czechoslovakia	
Eoin Hand	DF	20	2	4 May 1969	Czechoslovakia	29 October 1975	Turkey	
Denis Hannon	MF	2	0	28 May 1924	Bulgaria	2 June 1924	Netherlands	
Bill Harrington	GK	5	0	8 December 1935	Netherlands	22 May 1938	Poland	
Ian Harte	DF	63	12	2 June 1996	Croatia	7 February 2007	San Marino	
Jimmy Hartnett	FW	2	0	12 June 1949	Spain	7 March 1954	Luxembourg	
Joe Haverty	MF	32	3	10 May 1956	Netherlands	7 December 1966	Spain	
Austin Hayes	MF	1	0	2 May 1979	Denmark	2 May 1979	Denmark	
Bill Hayes	DF	2	0	30 September 1946	England	4 May 1947	Portugal	
Willie Hayes	GK	1	0	24 April 1949	Belgium	24 April 1949	Belgium	
Ron Healey	GK	2	0	24 April 1977	Poland	6 February 1980	England	
Colin Healy	MF	13	1	13 February 2002	Russia	11 October 2003	Switzerland	
Steve Heighway	MF	34	0	23 September 1970	Poland	25 March 1981	Netherlands	
Benny Henderson	FW	2	0	23 May 1948	Portugal	30 May 1948	Spain	
Wayne Henderson	GK	6	0	1 March 2006	Sweden	22 August 2007	Denmark	
Jeff Hendrick	MF	79	2	6 February 2013	Poland	19 June 2023	Gibraltar	
Jackie Hennessy	FW	5	0	25 October 1964	Poland	10 November 1968	Austria	
John Herrick	DF	3	0	10 October 1971	Austria	19 May 1973	France	
Jim Higgins	MF	1	0	13 May 1951	Argentina	13 May 1951	Argentina	
Joe Hodge	MF	1	0	5 June 2026	Canada	5 June 2026	Canada	
Scott Hogan	FW	12	0	23 March 2018	Turkey	14 June 2022	Armenia	
Matt Holland	MF	48	5	9 October 1999	Macedonia	12 October 2005	Switzerland	
Jimmy Holmes	DF	30	1	30 May 1971	Austria	24 February 1981	Wales	
Wes Hoolahan	MF	20	2	29 May 2008	Colombia	14 November 2017	Denmark	
Daryl Horgan	MF	17	1	28 March 2017	Iceland	9 October 2021	Azerbaijan	
Fred Horlacher	FW	7	2	11 May 1930	Belgium	17 March 1936	Switzerland	
Ray Houghton	MF	73	6	26 March 1986	Wales	15 November 1997	Belgium	
Conor Hourihane	MF	36	1	28 March 2017	Iceland	27 September 2022	Armenia	
Gary Howlett	MF	1	0	3 June 1984	China	3 June 1984	China	
Mick Hoy	DF	6	0	10 October 1937	Norway	23 May 1939	Germany	
Chris Hughton	DF	53	2	29 October 1979	United States	13 November 1991	Turkey	
Tony Hunston	MF	1	0	16 June 1924	United States	16 June 1924	United States	
Noel Hunt	FW	3	0	19 November 2008	Poland	14 October 2009	Montenegro	
Stephen Hunt	MF	39	1	7 February 2007	San Marino	4 June 2012	Hungary	
Charlie Hurley	DF	40	2	19 May 1957	England	8 Jun 1969	Hungary	
Freddie Hutchinson	DF	2	0	5 May 1935	Switzerland	8 May 1935	Germany	

== I ==
As of 23:11, 29 September 2026 (UTC)

Player	Pos.	Caps	Goals	Debut		Last or most recent match		Ref.
Player	Pos.	Caps	Goals	Date	Opponent	Date	Opponent	Ref.
Adam Idah	FW	42	7	3 September 2020	Bulgaria	27 September 2026	Israel	
Stephen Ireland	MF	6	4	1 March 2006	Sweden	8 September 2007	Slovakia	
Denis Irwin	DF	56	4	12 September 1990	Morocco	17 November 1999	Turkey	

== J ==
As of 23:13, 29 September 2026 (UTC)

Player	Pos.	Caps	Goals	Debut		Last or most recent match		Ref.
Player	Pos.	Caps	Goals	Date	Opponent	Date	Opponent	Ref.
Mikey Johnston	MF	19	2	22 March 2023	Latvia	13 November 2025	Hungary	
Billy Jordan	FW	2	0	8 April 1934	Netherlands	10 October 1937	Norway	
Davy Jordan	FW	2	1	17 May 1937	Switzerland	23 May 1937	France	
Alan Judge	MF	9	1	25 March 2016	Switzerland	14 November 2019	New Zealand	

== K ==
As of 23:14, 29 September 2026 (UTC)

Player	Pos.	Caps	Goals	Debut		Last or most recent match		Ref.
Player	Pos.	Caps	Goals	Date	Opponent	Date	Opponent	Ref.
Graham Kavanagh	MF	16	1	25 March 1998	Czech Republic	16 August 2006	Netherlands	
Peter Kavanagh	FW	2	0	26 April 1931	Spain	13 December 1931	Spain	
Robbie Keane	FW	146	68	25 March 1998	Czech Republic	31 August 2016	Oman	
Rory Keane	DF	4	0	5 December 1948	Switzerland	12 June 1949	Sweden	
Roy Keane	MF	67	9	22 May 1991	Chile	7 September 2005	France	
Will Keane	FW	5	0	14 November 2021	Luxembourg	7 September 2023	France	
Mick Kearin	MF	1	0	10 October 1971	Austria	10 October 1971	Austria	
Freddie Kearns	FW	1	0	7 March 1954	Luxembourg	7 March 1954	Luxembourg	
Mick Kearns	GK	18	0	23 September 1970	Poland	21 September 1979	Northern Ireland	
Josh Keeley	GK	1	0	16 May 2026	Grenada	16 May 2026	Grenada	
Caoimhín Kelleher	GK	34	0	8 June 2021	Hungary	27 September 2026	Israel	
Alan Kelly, Jr.	GK	34	0	17 February 1993	Wales	15 August 2001	Croatia	
Alan Kelly, Sr.	GK	47	0	25 November 1956	Germany	6 June 1973	Norway	
David Kelly	FW	26	9	10 November 1987	Israel	15 November 1997	Belgium	
Gary Kelly	DF	52	2	22 March 1994	Russia	16 October 2002	Switzerland	
Jimmy Kelly	FW	4	2	8 May 1932	Netherlands	9 May 1936	Luxembourg	
Mark Kelly	MF	4	0	27 April 1988	Yugoslavia	12 September 1990	Morocco	
Noel Kelly	FW	1	0	7 March 1954	Luxembourg	7 March 1954	Luxembourg	
Phil Kelly	DF	5	0	28 September 1960	Wales	29 October 1961	Czechoslovakia	
Stephen Kelly	DF	39	0	24 May 2006	Chile	10 June 2014	Portugal	
Joe Kendrick, Sr.	FW	5	0	28 May 1924	Bulgaria	8 December 1935	Netherlands	
Jeff Kenna	DF	27	0	26 April 1995	Portugal	17 November 1999	Turkey	
Mark Kennedy	MF	34	4	6 September 1995	Austria	13 February 2002	Russia	
Mick Kennedy	MF	2	0	25 May 1986	Iceland	27 May 1986	Czechoslovakia	
Willie Kennedy	FW	3	0	8 May 1932	Netherlands	8 April 1934	Netherlands	
Johnny Kenny	FW	2	0	13 November 2025	Czech Republic	31 March 2026	North Macedonia	
Paddy Kenny	GK	7	0	31 March 2004	Czech Republic	7 October 2006	Cyprus	
Andy Keogh	FW	30	2	23 May 2007	Ecuador	14 August 2013	Wales	
John Keogh	DF	1	0	4 May 1966	West Germany	4 May 1966	West Germany	
Richard Keogh	DF	26	1	6 February 2013	Poland	5 September 2019	Switzerland	
Shay Keogh	DF	1	0	5 October 1958	Poland	5 October 1958	Poland	
Alan Kernaghan	DF	22	1	9 September 1992	Latvia	15 June 1996	Bolivia	
Bertie Kerr	DF	3	0	28 May 1924	Bulgaria	14 June 1924	United States	
Dean Kiely	GK	11	0	13 November 1999	Turkey	20 August 2008	Norway	
Fred Kiernan	GK	5	0	13 May 1951	Argentina	7 May 1952	Austria	
Kevin Kilbane	MF	110	8	6 September 1997	Serbia	4 June 2011	Macedonia	
Joe Kinnear	DF	26	0	22 February 1967	Turkey	29 October 1975	Turkey	
Joe Kinsella	DF	1	0	12 February 1928	Belgium	12 February 1928	Belgium	
Mark Kinsella	MF	48	3	25 March 1998	Czech Republic	2 June 2004	Jamaica	
Owen Kinsella	DF	2	0	8 May 1932	Netherlands	10 October 1937	Norway	
Alec Kirkland	DF	1	0	23 April 1927	Italy	23 April 1927	Italy	
Liam Kitching	DF	1	0	27 September 2026	Israel	27 September 2026	Israel	
Jason Knight	MF	45	1	14 October 2020	Finland	27 September 2026	Israel	

== L ==
As of 23:15, 29 September 2026 (UTC)

Player	Pos.	Caps	Goals	Debut		Last or most recent match		Ref.
Player	Pos.	Caps	Goals	Date	Opponent	Date	Opponent	Ref.
Bill Lacey	MF	3	1	23 April 1927	Italy	11 May 1930	Belgium	
Dave Langan	DF	26	0	5 April 1978	Belgium	9 September 1987	Luxembourg	
Joseph Lapira	FW	1	0	23 May 2007	Ecuador	23 May 2007	Ecuador	
Bosun Lawal	MF	1	0	31 March 2026	North Macedonia	31 March 2026	North Macedonia	
Robin Lawler	MF	8	0	25 March 1953	Austria	19 October 1955	Yugoslavia	
Kit Lawlor	FW	3	0	24 April 1949	Belgium	13 May 1951	Argentina	
Mick Lawlor	MF	5	0	23 September 1970	Poland	16 May 1973	Poland	
Liam Lawrence	MF	15	2	29 May 2009	Nigeria	29 May 2011	Scotland	
Mark Lawrenson	DF	39	5	24 April 1977	Poland	10 November 1987	Israel	
Kian Leavy	MF	1	0	5 June 2026	Canada	5 June 2026	Canada	
Alan Lee	FW	10	0	30 April 2003	Norway	15 November 2006	San Marino	
Mick Leech	FW	8	2	4 May 1969	Czechoslovakia	18 October 1972	Soviet Union	
Darragh Lenihan	DF	4	0	2 June 2018	United States	16 June 2023	Greece	
Charlie Lennon	DF	3	0	16 December 1934	Hungary	8 May 1935	Germany	
George Lennox	DF	2	0	26 April 1931	Spain	13 December 1931	Spain	
Kevin Long	DF	17	1	1 June 2017	Mexico	18 November 2020	Bulgaria	
Shane Long	FW	88	17	7 February 2007	San Marino	30 March 2021	Qatar	
Dinny Lowry	GK	1	0	8 April 1962	Austria	8 April 1962	Austria	
Dicky Lunn	DF	2	0	18 September 1938	Switzerland	13 November 1938	Poland	
Miah Lynch	DF	1	0	25 February 1934	Belgium	25 February 1934	Belgium	

== M ==
As of 23:16, 29 September 2026 (UTC)

Player	Pos.	Caps	Goals	Debut		Last or most recent match		Ref.
Player	Pos.	Caps	Goals	Date	Opponent	Date	Opponent	Ref.
Alan Mahon	MF	2	0	26 April 2000	Greece	11 June 2000	South Africa	
Jon Macken	FW	1	0	18 August 2004	Bulgaria	18 August 2004	Bulgaria	
Tony Macken	DF	1	0	9 February 1977	Spain	9 February 1977	Spain	
Gerry Mackey	DF	2	0	3 October 1956	Denmark	8 May 1957	England	
Owen Madden	FW	1	1	3 May 1936	Hungary	3 May 1936	Hungary	
Jim Maguire	DF	1	0	20 April 1929	Belgium	20 April 1929	Belgium	
Gerry Malone	FW	1	0	24 April 1949	Belgium	24 April 1949	Belgium	
Terry Mancini	DF	5	1	21 October 1973	Poland	30 October 1974	Soviet Union	
Ryan Manning	DF	25	0	18 November 2020	Bulgaria	27 September 2026	Israel	
Christy Martin	FW	1	0	23 April 1927	Italy	23 April 1927	Italy	
Con Martin	DF	30	6	16 June 1946	Portugal	10 May 1956	Netherlands	
Mick Martin	MF	52	4	10 October 1971	Austria	27 April 1983	Spain	
Alan Maybury	DF	10	0	25 March 1998	Czech Republic	29 March 2005	China	
Ernie MacKay	DF	2	0	28 May 1924	Bulgaria	2 June 1924	Netherlands	
Jimmy McAlinden	MF	2	0	16 June 1946	Portugal	23 June 1946	Spain	
Jason McAteer	MF	52	3	22 March 1994	Russia	18 February 2004	Brazil	
Kasey McAteer	MF	8	1	7 September 2024	England	6 June 2025	Senegal	
Maxie McCann	FW	1	1	25 November 1956	West Germany	25 November 1956	West Germany	
Jack McCarthy	DF	6	0	28 May 1924	Bulgaria	11 May 1930	Belgium	
James McCarthy	MF	42	0	2 March 2010	Brazil	8 October 2020	Slovakia	
Mick McCarthy	DF	57	2	23 May 1984	Poland	7 June 1992	Portugal	
Mick McCarthy	GK	1	0	8 May 1932	Netherlands	8 May 1932	Netherlands	
James McClean	MF	103	11	29 February 2012	Czech Republic	21 November 2023	New Zealand	
Tommy McConville	DF	6	0	10 October 1971	Austria	19 May 1973	France	
Jacko McDonagh	DF	3	0	16 November 1983	Malta	8 August 1984	Mexico	
Jim McDonagh	GK	25	0	24 February 1981	Wales	13 November 1985	Denmark	
Andy McEvoy	FW	17	6	3 May 1961	Scotland	21 May 1967	Czechoslovakia	
Aiden McGeady	MF	93	5	2 June 2004	Jamaica	14 November 2017	Denmark	
Paul McGee	FW	15	4	5 April 1978	Turkey	15 October 1980	Belgium	
David McGoldrick	FW	14	1	18 November 2014	United States	8 October 2020	Slovakia	
Eddie McGoldrick	MF	15	0	25 March 1992	Switzerland	15 February 1995	England	
Danny McGowan	MF	3	0	22 May 1949	Portugal	12 June 1949	Spain	
Johnny McGowan	DF	1	0	2 March 1947	Spain	2 March 1947	Spain	
Jamie McGrath	MF	15	0	3 June 2021	Andorra	5 Hune 2026	Canada	
Mick McGrath	MF	22	0	14 May 1958	Austria	22 February 1967	Turkey	
Paul McGrath	DF	83	8	5 February 1985	Serbia	11 February 1997	Wales	
Mark McGuinness	DF	2	0	17 November 2024	England	16 May 2026	Grenada	
Bill McGuire	DF	1	0	5 May 1935	Switzerland	5 May 1935	Switzerland	
George McKenzie	GK	9	0	10 October 1937	Norway	23 May 1939	Germany	
Alan McLoughlin	MF	42	2	2 June 1990	Malta	9 October 1999	Macedonia	
Frank McLoughlin	FW	2	0	11 May 1930	Belgium	13 December 1931	Spain	
Billy McMillan	DF	2	0	16 June 1946	Portugal	23 June 1946	Spain	
Brendan McNally	DF	3	0	5 April 1959	Czechoslovakia	2 September 1962	Iceland	
Stephen McPhail	MF	10	1	30 May 2000	Scotland	29 May 2004	Nigeria	
Paul McShane	DF	33	0	11 October 2006	Czech Republic	29 March 2016	Slovakia	
Mick Meagan	DF	17	0	7 May 1961	Scotland	21 September 1969	Scotland	
Paddy Meehan	FW	1	0	8 April 1934	Netherlands	8 April 1934	Netherlands	
Mason Melia	FW	2	0	28 May 2026	Qatar	5 June 2026	Canada	
David Meyler	MF	25	0	11 September 2012	Serbia	11 September 2018	Poland	
Liam Miller	MF	21	1	31 March 2004	Czech Republic	14 October 2009	Montenegro	
Mike Milligan	MF	1	0	29 April 1992	United States	29 April 1992	United States	
Jayson Molumby	MF	38	0	6 September 2020	Finland	27 September 2026	Israel	
Paddy Monaghan	FW	2	0	5 May 1935	Switzerland	8 May 1935	Germany	
Jackie Mooney	FW	2	1	25 October 1964	Poland	24 March 1965	Belgium	
Alan Moore	MF	8	0	24 April 1996	Czechoslovakia	10 November 1996	Iceland	
Paddy Moore	FW	9	7	26 April 1931	Spain	6 December 1936	Hungary	
Andrew Moran	MF	4	0	21 November 2023	New Zealand	16 May 2026	Grenada	
Kevin Moran	DF	71	6	30 April 1980	Switzerland	24 May 1994	Bolivia	
Tommy Moroney	MF	12	1	30 May 1948	Spain	4 October 1953	France	
Chris Morris	DF	35	0	10 November 1987	Israel	17 February 1993	Wales	
Clinton Morrison	FW	36	9	15 August 2001	Croatia	7 October 2006	Cyprus	
Con Moulson	DF	5	0	3 May 1936	Hungary	23 May 1937	France	
George Moulson	GK	3	0	23 May 1948	Portugal	5 December 1948	Switzerland	
Jack Moylan	FW	4	4	16 May 2026	Grenada	27 September 2026	Israel	
Cathal Muckian	FW	1	0	12 April 1978	Poland	12 April 1978	Poland	
Tommy Muldoon	MF	5	0	28 May 1924	Bulgaria	23 April 1927	Italy	
Paddy Mulligan	DF	50	1	4 May 1969	Czechoslovakia	29 October 1979	United States	
Liam Munroe	FW	1	0	28 October 1953	Luxembourg	28 October 1953	Luxembourg	
Albie Murphy	DF	1	0	19 October 1955	Yugoslavia	19 October 1955	Yugoslavia	
Barry Murphy	DF	1	0	23 April 1986	Uruguay	23 April 1986	Uruguay	
Daryl Murphy	FW	31	3	23 May 2007	Ecuador	14 November 2017	Denmark	
Jerry Murphy	MF	3	0	11 September 1979	Wales	26 March 1980	Cyprus	
Joe Murphy	GK	2	0	9 September 2003	Turkey	28 May 2010	Algeria	
Peter Murphy	DF	1	0	26 May 2007	Bolivia	26 May 2007	Bolivia	
Thomas Murphy	DF	2	0	3 June 1924	Estonia	14 June 1924	United States	
Johnny Murray	FW	4	0	28 May 1924	Bulgaria	14 June 1924	United States	
Terry Murray	FW	1	0	10 May 1950	Belgium	10 May 1950	Belgium	

== N ==
As of 23:20, 29 September 2026 (UTC)

Player	Pos.	Caps	Goals	Debut		Last or most recent match		Ref.
Player	Pos.	Caps	Goals	Date	Opponent	Date	Opponent	Ref.
Corrie Ndaba	DF	2	0	28 May 2026	Qatar	5 June 2026	Canada	
Billy Newman	MF	1	0	27 May 1969	Denmark	27 May 1969	Denmark	
Eddie Nolan	DF	3	0	29 May 2009	Nigeria	8 September 2009	South Africa	
Ronnie Nolan	DF	10	0	3 October 1956	Denmark	2 September 1962	Iceland	

== O ==
As of 23:21, 29 September 2026 (UTC)

Player	Pos.	Caps	Goals	Debut		Last or most recent match		Ref.
Player	Pos.	Caps	Goals	Date	Opponent	Date	Opponent	Ref.
Michael Obafemi	FW	12	2	19 October 2018	Denmark	4 June 2024	Hungary	
Chiedozie Ogbene	FW	36	5	8 June 2021	Hungary	24 September 2026	Kosovo	
Andrew Omobamidele	DF	10	0	1 September 2021	Portugal	10 September 2024	Greece	
Alan O'Brien	MF	5	0	16 August 2006	Netherlands	26 May 2007	Bolivia	
Andy O'Brien	DF	26	1	6 June 2001	Estonia	7 October 2006	Cyprus	
Fran O'Brien	MF	3	0	26 September 1979	Czechoslovakia	26 March 1980	Cyprus	
Jake O'Brien	DF	19	0	4 June 2024	Hungary	27 September 2026	Israel	
Joey O'Brien	MF	5	0	1 March 2006	Sweden	11 September 2012	Oman	
Liam O'Brien	MF	16	0	23 April 1986	Uruguay	9 October 1996	Macedonia	
Mick O'Brien	MF	4	0	23 April 1927	Italy	8 May 1932	Netherlands	
Ray O'Brien	DF	5	0	24 March 1976	Norway	16 May 1980	Argentina	
Lar O'Byrne	DF	1	0	24 April 1949	Belgium	24 April 1949	Belgium	
Brendan O'Callaghan	FW	6	0	22 May 1979	West Germany	30 May 1982	Trinidad and Tobago	
Kevin O'Callaghan	MF	21	1	29 April 1981	Czechoslovakia	23 May 1987	Brazil	
Joe O'Cearuill	DF	2	0	23 May 2007	Ecuador	26 May 2007	Bolivia	
Tony O'Connell	FW	2	0	23 October 1966	Spain	23 September 1970	Poland	
Tommy O'Connor	FW	4	0	8 September 1949	Finland	13 November 1949	Sweden	
Turlough O'Connor	MF	8	0	22 November 1967	Czechoslovakia	16 May 1973	Poland	
Darren O'Dea	DF	20	1	8 September 2009	South Africa	14 August 2013	Wales	
Callum O'Dowda	DF	32	1	31 May 2016	Belarus	17 November 2024	England	
Jackie O'Driscoll	MF	3	0	5 December 1948	Switzerland	2 June 1949	Sweden	
Sean O'Driscoll	MF	3	0	21 May 1982	Chile	30 May 1982	Trinidad and Tobago	
Frank O'Farrell	DF	9	2	7 May 1952	Austria	10 May 1959	Czechoslovakia	
Kevin O'Flanagan	FW	10	3	7 November 1937	Norway	4 May 1947	Portugal	
Mick O'Flanagan	FW	1	0	30 September 1946	England	30 September 1946	England	
Stephen O'Halloran	DF	2	0	23 May 2007	Ecuador	26 May 2007	Bolivia	
Kelham O'Hanlon	GK	1	0	10 November 1987	Israel	10 November 1987	Israel	
Paddy O'Kane	DF	3	0	16 December 1934	Hungary	8 May 1935	Germany	
Eamonn O'Keefe	FW	5	1	24 February 1981	Wales	26 March 1985	England	
Tim O'Keefe	FW	3	0	25 February 1934	Belgium	22 May 1938	Poland	
David O'Leary	DF	68	1	8 September 1976	England	17 February 1993	Wales	
Max O'Leary	GK	2	0	10 June 2025	Luxembourg	16 May 2026	Grenada	
Pierce O'Leary	DF	7	0	26 September 1979	Czechoslovakia	10 September 1980	Netherlands	
Matt O'Mahoney	DF	6	0	18 May 1938	Czechoslovakia	23 May 1939	Germany	
Frank O'Neill	MF	20	1	8 October 1961	Czechoslovakia	10 October 1971	Austria	
Jimmy O'Neill	GK	17	0	1 June 1952	Spain	10 May 1959	Czechoslovakia	
John O'Neill	DF	1	0	28 September 1960	Wales	28 September 1960	Wales	
Keith O'Neill	FW	13	4	29 May 1996	Portugal	9 October 1999	Macedonia	
Willie O'Neill	DF	11	0	8 December 1935	Netherlands	23 May 1939	Germany	
Kieran O'Regan	MF	4	0	16 November 1983	Malta	26 May 1985	Spain	
Jack O'Reilly	FW	2	1	16 June 1946	Portugal	23 June 1946	Spain	
Joe O'Reilly	MF	20	2	8 May 1932	Netherlands	23 May 1939	Germany	
Paddy O'Reilly	GK	3	0	28 May 1924	Bulgaria	3 June 1924	Estonia	
Dara O'Shea	DF	47	0	14 October 2020	Finland	27 September 2026	Israel	
John O'Shea	DF	118	3	15 August 2001	Croatia	2 June 2018	United States	

== P ==
As of 23:24, 29 September 2026 (UTC)

Player	Pos.	Caps	Goals	Debut		Last or most recent match		Ref.
Player	Pos.	Caps	Goals	Date	Opponent	Date	Opponent	Ref.
Troy Parrott	FW	39	12	14 November 2019	New Zealand	27 September 2026	Israel	
John Patrick	MF	1	0	10 June 2025	Luxembourg	10 June 2025	Luxembourg	
Alex Pearce	DF	9	2	11 September 2012	Oman	4 June 2017	Uruguay	
Gerry Peyton	GK	33	0	9 February 1977	Spain	7 June 1992	Portugal	
Noel Peyton	MF	6	0	25 November 1956	West Germany	9 June 1963	Scotland	
Terry Phelan	DF	42	0	11 September 1991	Hungary	11 June 2000	South Africa	
Killian Phillips	MF	5	0	6 June 2025	Senegal	27 September 2026	Israel	
Anthony Pilkington	MF	9	1	6 September 2013	Sweden	29 March 2016	Slovakia	
Darren Potter	MF	5	0	23 May 2007	Ecuador	6 February 2008	Brazil	

== Q ==
As of 23:25, 29 September 2026 (UTC)

Player	Pos.	Caps	Goals	Debut		Last or most recent match		Ref.
Player	Pos.	Caps	Goals	Date	Opponent	Date	Opponent	Ref.
Alan Quinn	MF	8	0	30 April 2003	Norway	28 March 2007	Slovakia	
Barry Quinn	MF	4	0	26 April 2000	Greece	11 June 2000	South Africa	
Niall Quinn	FW	91	21	25 May 1986	Iceland	16 June 2002	Spain	
Stephen Quinn	MF	10	0	2 Jun 2013	Georgia	5 September 2016	Serbia	

== R ==
As of 23:26, 29 September 2026 (UTC)

Player	Pos.	Caps	Goals	Debut		Last or most recent match		Ref.
Player	Pos.	Caps	Goals	Date	Opponent	Date	Opponent	Ref.
Darren Randolph	GK	50	0	11 September 2012	Oman	18 November 2020	Bulgaria	
Andy Reid	MF	29	4	18 November 2003	Canada	15 November 2013	Latvia	
Charlie Reid	FW	1	0	26 April 1931	Spain	26 April 1931	Spain	
Steven Reid	MF	23	2	15 August 2001	Croatia	10 September 2008	Montenegro	
Declan Rice	MF	3	0	23 March 2018	Turkey	2 June 2018	United States	
Damien Richardson	FW	3	0	10 October 1971	Austria	26 September 1979	Czechoslovakia	
Alf Rigby	FW	3	0	16 December 1934	Hungary	8 May 1935	Germany	
Alf Ringstead	FW	20	6	13 May 1951	Argentina	10 May 1959	Czechoslovakia	
Callum Robinson	FW	38	9	6 September 2018	Wales	10 September 2024	Greece	
Christy Robinson	FW	1	1	3 June 1924	Estonia	3 June 1924	Estonia	
Jeremiah Robinson	DF	2	0	12 February 1928	Belgium	26 April 1931	Spain	
Michael Robinson	FW	24	4	28 October 1980	France	27 May 1986	Iceland	
Paddy Roche	GK	8	0	10 October 1971	Austria	29 October 1975	Turkey	
Eamonn Rogers	MF	19	5	22 November 1967	Czechoslovakia	18 October 1972	Soviet Union	
Martin Rowlands	MF	5	0	27 May 2004	Romania	14 October 2009	Montenegro	
Gerry Ryan	FW	18	1	5 April 1978	Turkey	8 August 1984	Mexico	
Reg Ryan	MF	16	3	13 November 1949	Sweden	27 November 1955	Spain	

== S ==
As of 23:26, 29 September 2026 (UTC)

Player	Pos.	Caps	Goals	Debut		Last or most recent match		Ref.
Player	Pos.	Caps	Goals	Date	Opponent	Date	Opponent	Ref.
Richard Sadlier	FW	1	0	13 February 2002	Russia	13 February 2002	Russia	
Conor Sammon	FW	9	0	6 February 2013	Poland	10 September 2013	Austria	
Dave Savage	MF	5	0	29 May 1996	Portugal	15 June 1996	Bolivia	
Pat Saward	DF	18	0	7 March 1954	Luxembourg	2 September 1962	Iceland	
Liam Scales	DF	17	1	13 October 2023	Greece	24 September 2026	Kosovo	
Tom Scannell	GK	1	0	7 March 1954	Luxembourg	7 March 1954	Luxembourg	
Pat Scully	DF	1	0	19 October 1988	Tunisia	19 October 1988	Tunisia	
Kevin Sheedy	MF	46	9	12 October 1983	Netherlands	17 February 1993	Wales	
Cillian Sheridan	FW	3	0	25 May 2010	Paraguay	11 August 2010	Argentina	
John Sheridan	FW	34	5	23 March 1988	Romania	13 December 1995	Netherlands	
Bernie Slaven	FW	7	1	28 March 1990	Wales	17 February 1993	Wales	
Paddy Sloan	MF	2	1	16 June 1946	Portugal	23 June 1946	Spain	
Will Smallbone	MF	15	0	22 March 2023	Latvia	14 October 2025	Armenia	
Mick Smyth	GK	1	0	15 May 1968	Poland	15 May 1968	Poland	
Johnny Squires	FW	1	1	8 April 1934	Netherlands	8 April 1934	Netherlands	
Sean St Ledger	DF	37	3	29 May 2009	Nigeria	19 November 2013	Poland	
Frank Stapleton	FW	71	20	13 October 1976	Turkey	2 June 1990	Malta	
Steve Staunton	DF	102	8	19 October 1988	Tunisia	16 June 2002	Spain	
Enda Stevens	DF	26	0	2 June 2018	United States	7 September 2023	France	
Alex Stevenson	FW	7	0	8 May 1932	Netherlands	5 December 1948	Switzerland	
Anthony Stokes	FW	9	0	7 February 2007	San Marino	18 November 2014	United States	
Freddie Strahan	MF	5	1	10 May 1964	Poland	4 May 1966	West Germany	
Jack Sullivan	DF	1	0	12 February 1928	Belgium	12 February 1928	Belgium	
Maurice Swan	GK	1	0	18 May 1960	Sweden	18 May 1960	Sweden	
Mark Sykes	MF	7	0	20 November 2022	Malta	23 March 2025	Bulgaria	
Noel Synnott	DF	3	0	5 April 1978	Turkey	20 September 1978	Northern Ireland	
Sammie Szmodics	FW	12	0	23 March 2024	Belgium	26 March 2026	Czech Republic	

== T ==
As of 23:28, 29 September 2026 (UTC)

Player	Pos.	Caps	Goals	Debut		Last or most recent match		Ref.
Player	Pos.	Caps	Goals	Date	Opponent	Date	Opponent	Ref.
Jack Taylor	MF	11	0	13 October 2024	Poland	26 March 2026	Czech Republic	
Tommy Taylor	GK	1	0	5 October 1958	Poland	5 October 1958	Poland	
Peter Thomas	GK	2	0	21 October 1973	Poland	5 May 1974	Brazil	
John Thompson	DF	1	0	18 November 2003	Canada	18 November 2003	Canada	
Andy Townsend	MF	70	7	7 February 1989	France	15 November 1997	Belgium	
Mark Travers	GK	6	0	10 September 2019	Bulgaria	5 June 2026	Canada	
Tommy Traynor	DF	8	0	7 March 1954	Luxembourg	11 March 1964	Spain	
Keith Treacy	MF	6	0	11 August 2010	Argentina	10 August 2011	Croatia	
Ray Treacy	FW	42	5	4 May 1966	West Germany	26 September 1979	Czechoslovakia	
Liam Tuohy	FW	8	4	19 October 1955	Yugoslavia	24 March 1965	Belgium	
Charlie Turner	DF	10	0	7 March 1936	Switzerland	19 March 1939	Hungary	
Paddy Turner	FW	2	0	9 June 1963	Scotland	8 April 1964	Spain	

== U ==
As of 23:29, 29 September 2026 (UTC)

Player	Pos.	Caps	Goals	Debut		Last or most recent match		Ref.
Player	Pos.	Caps	Goals	Date	Opponent	Date	Opponent	Ref.
Jaden Umeh	FW	2	0	28 May 2026	Qatar	5 June 2026	Canada	

== V ==
As of 23:30, 29 September 2026 (UTC)

Player	Pos.	Caps	Goals	Debut		Last or most recent match		Ref.
Player	Pos.	Caps	Goals	Date	Opponent	Date	Opponent	Ref.
Harvey Vale	MF	2	0	26 March 2026	Czech Republic	31 March 2026	North Macedonia	
Rocco Vata	MF	2	0	20 March 2025	Bulgaria	27 September 2026	Israel	
Jackie Vernon	DF	2	0	16 June 1946	Portugal	23 June 1946	Spain	

== W ==
As of 23:31, 29 September 2026 (UTC)

Player	Pos.	Caps	Goals	Debut		Last or most recent match		Ref.
Player	Pos.	Caps	Goals	Date	Opponent	Date	Opponent	Ref.
Gary Waddock	MF	21	3	30 April 1980	Switzerland	27 May 1990	Turkey	
Billy Walsh	MF	9	0	30 September 1946	England	10 May 1950	Belgium	
Davy Walsh	FW	20	5	16 June 1946	Portugal	25 November 1953	France	
Johnny Walsh	MF	1	0	30 May 1982	Trinidad and Tobago	30 May 1982	Trinidad and Tobago	
Mike Walsh	DF	4	0	21 May 1982	Chile	13 October 1982	Iceland	
Mickey Walsh	FW	21	2	24 March 1976	Norway	14 November 1984	Denmark	
Jonathan Walters	FW	53	14	17 November 2010	Norway	6 September 2018	Wales	
Stephen Ward	DF	49	3	24 May 2011	Northern Ireland	6 September 2018	Wales	
Joe Waters	MF	2	1	13 October 1976	Turkey	21 November 1979	Northern Ireland	
Fran Watters	FW	1	0	21 March 1926	Italy	21 March 1926	Italy	
Ned Weir	MF	3	0	19 March 1939	Hungary	23 May 1939	Germany	
Keiren Westwood	GK	21	0	29 May 2009	Nigeria	4 June 2017	Uruguay	
Glenn Whelan	MF	91	2	24 May 2008	Serbia	18 November 2019	Denmark	
Billy Whelan	MF	4	0	10 May 1956	Netherlands	19 May 1957	England	
Ronnie Whelan	MF	53	3	29 April 1981	Czechoslovakia	12 September 1995	Morocco	
Ronnie Whelan, Sr.	FW	2	0	25 September 1963	Austria	24 May 1964	England	
Jimmy White	FW	1	2	12 February 1928	Belgium	12 February 1928	Belgium	
Dick Whittaker	DF	1	0	10 May 1959	Czechoslovakia	10 May 1959	Czechoslovakia	
Derrick Williams	FW	3	1	28 May 2018	France	14 November 2018	New Zealand	
Joe Williams	DF	1	0	10 October 1937	Norway	10 October 1937	Norway	
Shaun Williams	FW	3	1	28 May 2018	France	11 September 2018	Poland	
Marc Wilson	DF	25	1	8 February 2011	Wales	31 August 2016	Oman	
