= Ireland national football team (FAI) results =

- Win Draw Loss

This article contains the results of the Ireland team selected by the Football Association of Ireland. It was previously known as the Irish Free State. After a FIFA ruling they became the Republic of Ireland in 1954.

== 1930s ==
=== 1936 ===
| 17 March 1936 Friendly | Ireland | 1–0 | Switzerland | Dublin, Ireland |
| | Jimmy Dunne 34' | (Report) | | Stadium: Dalymount Park; Attendance: 32,000; Referee: Langenus (Belgium) |
Note: This was the first game that the FAI referred to the team as Ireland.

| 3 May 1936 Friendly | Hungary | 3–3 | Ireland | Budapest, Hungary |
| | Sárosi 7', 48' (pen.); Sas 75' | (Report) | Dunne 12'; O'Reilly 19'; Dunne or Madden 68' | Stadium: Hungária Úti Stadium; Attendance: 15,000; Referee: Bruell (Czechoslovakia) |

| 6 May 1936 Unofficial friendly | Rhineland XI | 4–1 | Ireland | Cologne, Germany |
| | | (Report) | Jimmy Dunne | Attendance: 10,000 (estimate) |

| 9 May 1936 Friendly | Luxembourg | 1–5 | Ireland | Luxembourg, Luxembourg |
| | Mart 59' (pen.) | (Report) | Jimmy Dunne 9', 86'; Donnelly 65'; Kelly 71', 87' | Stadium: Stade Municipal; Attendance: 8,000; Referee: Bauwens (Germany) |

| 17 October 1936 Friendly | Ireland | 5–2 | Germany | Dublin, Ireland |
| | Donnelly 25', 69'; Davis 35' (pen.), 65'; Geoghegan 58' | (Report) | Kobierski 26'; Szepan 32' | Stadium: Dalymount Park; Attendance: 28,000; Referee: Webb (Scotland) |

| 6 December 1936 Friendly | Ireland | 2–3 | Hungary | Dublin, Ireland |
| | Fallon 20'; Davis 72' (pen.) | (Report) | Titkos 37'; Cseh 38'; Toldi 48' | Stadium: Dalymount Park; Attendance: 27,000; Referee: Nattrass (England) |

=== 1937 ===
| 17 May 1937 Friendly | Switzerland | 0–1 | Ireland | Bern, Switzerland |
| | | (Report) | Jimmy Dunne 30' | Stadium: Wankdorf Stadium; Attendance: 25,000; Referee: Lewington (England) |

| 23 May 1937 Friendly | France | 0–2 | Ireland | Paris, France |
| | | (Report) | Jordan 52'; Brown 58' | Stadium: Colombes Stadium; Attendance: 16,688; Referee: Krist (Czechoslovakia) |

| 10 October 1937 1938 FIFA World Cup qualification | Norway | 3–2 | Ireland | Oslo, Norway |
| | Kvammen 30', 64'; Martinsen 78' | (Report) | Geoghegan 37'; Jimmy Dunne 49' | Stadium: Ullevaal Stadion; Attendance: 28,000; Referee: Bauwens (Germany) |

| 7 November 1937 1938 FIFA World Cup qualification | Ireland | 3–3 | Norway | Dublin, Ireland |
| | Jimmy Dunne 10'; O'Flanagan 62'; Duggan 88' | (Report) | Kvammen 16', 33'; Martinsen 49' | Stadium: Dalymount Park; Attendance: 27,000; Referee: Gibbs (England) |

=== 1938 ===
| 18 May 1938 Friendly | Czechoslovakia | 2–2 | Ireland | Prague, Czechoslovakia |
| | Nejedly 3' (pen.), 46' | (Report) | Davis 42'; Jimmy Dunne 89' | Stadium: AC Sparta Stadium; Attendance: 17,000; Referee: Barlassina (Italy) |

| 22 May 1938 Friendly | Poland | 6–0 | Ireland | Warsaw, Poland |
| | Wasiewicz 12'; Wodarz 21', 78'; Piątek 43', 50'; Wilimowski 58' | (Report) | | Stadium: Polish Army Stadium; Attendance: 25,000; Referee: Majorsky (Hungary) |

| 18 September 1938 Friendly | Ireland | 4–0 | Switzerland | Dublin, Ireland |
| | Bradshaw 1', 20'; Jimmy Dunne 8'; Donnelly | (Report) | | Stadium: Dalymount Park; Attendance: 31,000; Referee: Mortimer (England) |

| 13 November 1938 Friendly | Ireland | 3–2 | Poland | Dublin, Ireland |
| | Fallon 10'; Carey 12'; Jimmy Dunne 68' | (Report) | Wilimowski 17'; Piątek 83' | Stadium: Dalymount Park; Attendance: 34,295; Referee: Bauwens (Germany) |

=== 1939 ===
| 19 March 1939 Friendly | Ireland | 2–2 | Hungary | Cork, Ireland |
| | Bradshaw 14'; Carey 87' | (Report) | Zsengellér 35'; Kolláth 50' | Stadium: Mardyke Arena; Attendance: 12,000; Referee: Nattrass (England) |

| 18 May 1939 Friendly | Hungary | 2–2 | Ireland | Budapest, Hungary |
| | Kolláth 41', 86' | (Report) | O'Flanagan 53', 80' | Stadium: Hungária Úti Stadium; Attendance: 15,000; Referee: Bauwens (Germany) |

| 23 May 1939 Friendly | Germany | 1–1 | Ireland | Bremen, Germany |
| | Schön 38' | (Report) | Bradshaw 65' | Stadium: Weserstadion; Attendance: 35,000; Referee: Remke (Denmark) |

== 1940s ==
=== 1946 ===
| 16 June 1946 Friendly | Portugal | 3–1 | Ireland | Lisbon, Portugal |
| | Araujo 7'; Rogerio 17'; Peyroteo 20' | (Report) | O'Reilly | Stadium: Estádio da Luz; Attendance: 60,000; Referee: von Wartburg (Switzerland) |

| 23 June 1946 Friendly | Spain | 0–1 | Ireland | Madrid, Spain |
| | | (Report) | Sloan 37' | Stadium: Metropolitano; Attendance: 45,000; Referee: von Wartburg (Switzerland) |

| 30 September 1946 Friendly | Ireland | 0–1 | England | Dublin, Ireland |
| | | (Report) | Finney 82' | Stadium: Dalymount Park; Attendance: 31,988; Referee: Webb (Scotland) |

=== 1947 ===
| 2 March 1947 Friendly | Ireland | 3–2 | Spain | Dublin, Ireland |
| | Walsh 16', 79'; Coad 23' | (Report) | Zarra 26', 59' | Stadium: Dalymount Park; Attendance: 42,102; Referee: Barrick (England) |

| 4 May 1947 Friendly | Ireland | 0–2 | Portugal | Dublin, Ireland |
| | | (Report) | Correia; Araujo | Stadium: Dalymount Park; Attendance: 31,618; Referee: Pearse (England) |

=== 1948 ===
| 23 May 1948 Friendly | Portugal | 2–0 | Ireland | Lisbon, Portugal |
| | Peyroteo 22'; Albano 26' | (Report) | | Stadium: Estádio da Luz; Attendance: 50,000; Referee: Dattilo (Italy) |

| 30 May 1948 Friendly | Spain | 2–1 | Ireland | Barcelona, Spain |
| | Igoa 32', 71' | (Report) | Moroney | Stadium: Montjuic Stadium; Attendance: ??,??? Referee: Szel (France) |

| 26 July 1948 1948 Summer Olympics preliminary round | Netherlands | 3–1 | Ireland | Portsmouth, England |
| | Wilkes 1', 74'; Roosenburg 11' | (Report) | O'Kelly 52' | Stadium: Fratton Park; Attendance: 8,000; Referee: George Reader (England) |
Note: Recognised as full international by FIFA, the IFFHS and by Netherlands national football team. See also 1924 Results.

| 5 December 1948 Friendly | Ireland | 0–1 | Switzerland | Dublin, Ireland |
| | | (Report) | Bickel 53' | Stadium: Dalymount Park; Attendance: 25,563; Referee: George Reader (England) |

=== 1949 ===
| 24 April 1949 Friendly | Ireland | 0–2 | Belgium | Dublin, Ireland |
| | | (Report) | Lemberechts 54'; Mermans 84' | Stadium: Dalymount Park; Attendance: 28,018; Referee: Sdez (France) |

| 22 May 1949 Friendly | Ireland | 1–0 | Portugal | Dublin, Ireland |
| | Coad 35' (pen.) | (Report) | | Stadium: Dalymount Park; Attendance: 28,108; Referee: Le Foll (France) |

| 2 June 1949 1950 FIFA World Cup qualification | Sweden | 3–1 | Ireland | Stockholm, Sweden |
| | Anderson 17' (pen.); Jeppson 37'; Liedholm 69' | (Report) | Walsh 9' | Stadium: Råsunda Stadion; Attendance: 38,000; Referee: Baert (Belgium) |

| 12 June 1949 Friendly | Ireland | 1–4 | Spain | Dublin, Ireland |
| | Martin 14' (pen.) | (Report) | Zarra 30', 36'; Basora 35'; Igoa 86' | Stadium: Dalymount Park; Attendance: 30,171; Referee: Ellis (England) |

| 8 September 1949 1950 FIFA World Cup qualification | Ireland | 3–0 | Finland | Dublin, Ireland |
| | Gavin 35'; Martin 44' (pen.), 68' | (Report) | | Stadium: Dalymount Park; Attendance: 22,479; Referee: Evans (England) |

| 21 September 1949 Friendly | England | 0–2 | Ireland | Liverpool, England |
| | | (Report) | Martin 33' (pen.); Farrell 85' | Stadium: Goodison Park; Attendance: 51,047; Referee: Mowat (Scotland) |

| 9 October 1949 1950 FIFA World Cup qualification | Finland | 1–1 | Ireland | Helsinki, Finland |
| | Vaihela 89' | (Report) | Farrell 65' | Stadium: Olympiastadion; Attendance: 13,000; Referee: Bronkhorst (Netherlands) |

| 13 November 1949 1950 FIFA World Cup qualification | Ireland | 1–3 | Sweden | Dublin, Ireland |
| | Martin 61' (pen.) | (Report) | Palmér 4', 40', 68' | Stadium: Dalymount Park; Attendance: 41,031; Referee: Ling (England) |

== 1950s ==
=== 1950 ===
| 10 May 1950 Friendly | Belgium | 5–1 | Ireland | Brussels, Belgium |
| | Mermans 3', 33', 84'; De Hert 19'; Chaves 56' | (Report) | Duffy 72' | Stadium: Century Stadium; Attendance: 25,000; Referee: Bronkhorst (Netherlands) |

| 26 November 1950 Friendly | Ireland | 2–2 | Norway | Dublin, Ireland |
| | Carey 24' (pen.); Walsh 61' | (Report) | Bredesen 6'; Andresen 11' | Stadium: Dalymount Park; Attendance: 31,215; Referee: Pearse (England) |

=== 1951 ===
| 13 May 1951 Friendly | Ireland | 0–1 | Argentina | Dublin, Ireland |
| | | (Report) | Labruna 54' | Stadium: Dalymount Park; Attendance: 40,000; Referee: Leafe (England) |

| 30 May 1951 Friendly | Norway | 2–3 | Ireland | Oslo, Norway |
| | Sorenson 14'; Hvidsten 55' | (Report) | Farrell 17'; Ringstead 67'; Coad 82' | Stadium: Ullevaal Stadion; Attendance: 20,900; Referee: Jørgensen (Denmark) |

| 17 October 1951 Friendly | Ireland | 3–2 | West Germany | Dublin, Ireland |
| | Posipal 9' (o.g.); Fitzsimons 40'; Glynn 85' | (Report) | Morlock 63'; Fritz Walter 75' | Stadium: Dalymount Park; Attendance: 29,451; Referee: Ling (England) |

=== 1952 ===
| 4 May 1952 Friendly | West Germany | 3–0 | Ireland | Cologne, West Germany |
| | Posipal 31'; Ottmar Walter 77'; Termath 87' | (Report) | | Stadium: Müngersdorfer Stadion; Attendance: 80,000; Referee: Ellis (England) |

| 7 May 1952 Friendly | Austria | 6–0 | Ireland | Vienna, Austria |
| | Huber 22', 24', 26'; Haummer 36'; Dienst 58', 81' | (Report) | | Stadium: Praeter Park; Attendance: 64,000; Referee: Reinhardt (West Germany) |

| 1 June 1952 Friendly | Spain | 6–0 | Ireland | Madrid, Spain |
| | Coque 3'; Gainza 10'; Cesar 13'; Basora 43', 70'; Panizo 67' | (Report) | | Stadium: Nuevo Estadio Chamartín; Attendance: 75,000; Referee: Leafe (England) |

| 16 November 1952 Friendly | Ireland | 1–1 | France | Dublin, Ireland |
| | Fallon 24' | (Report) | Piantoni 67' | Stadium: Dalymount Park; Attendance: 40,000; Referee: Alsteen (Belgium) |

=== 1953 ===
| 25 March 1953 Friendly | Ireland | 4–0 | Austria | Dublin, Ireland |
| | Ringstead 46', 53'; Eglington 74'; O'Farrell 80' | (Report) | | Stadium: Dalymount Park; Attendance: 40,000; Referee: Ellis (England) |

| 4 October 1953 1954 FIFA World Cup qualification | Ireland | 3–5 | France | Dublin, Ireland |
| | Ryan 58'; Walsh 83'; O'Farrell 88' | (Report) | Glovacki 23'; Penverne 40'; Ujlaki 50', 69'; Flamion 72' | Stadium: Dalymount Park; Attendance: 45,000; Referee: Franken (Belgium) |

| 28 October 1953 1954 FIFA World Cup qualification | Ireland | 4–0 | Luxembourg | Dublin, Ireland |
| | Fitzsimons 18', 59'; Ryan 48'; Eglington 62' | (Report) | | Stadium: Dalymount Park; Attendance: 20,000; Referee: Bond (England) |

| 25 November 1953 1954 FIFA World Cup qualification | France | 1–0 | Ireland | Paris, France |
| | Piantoni 73' | (Report) | | Stadium: Parc des Princes; Attendance: 32,256; Referee: Van Nuffel (Belgium) |

=== 1954 ===
| 7 March 1954 1954 FIFA World Cup qualification | Luxembourg | 0–1 | Ireland | Luxembourg, Luxembourg |
| | | (Report) | Cummins 62' | Stadium: Stade Municipal; Attendance: 20,000; Referee: Aussen (Netherlands) |

== See also ==
- Irish Free State national football team - Results
- Republic of Ireland national football team - 1950s Results
