= Irish Free State national football team results =

- Win Draw Loss

This article features the results of the national football team of the Irish Free State between 1924 and 1935. The team, now the Republic of Ireland national football team, was selected by the Football Association of Ireland.

== Results ==
Irish Free State's score is shown first in each case.

Irish Free State national football team results
No.	Date	Venue	Opponents	Score	Competition	Irish Free State scorers	Att.	Ref.
1	28 May 1924	Stade Olympique, Colombes (N)	Bulgaria	1–0	1924 Summer Olympics	Duncan	1,659	
2	2 June 1924	Stade de Paris, Saint-Ouen (N)	Netherlands	1–2 (a.e.t.)	1924 Summer Olympics	Ghent	1,506	
3	3 June 1924	Stade Olympique, Colombes (N)	Estonia	3–1	Friendly	Duncan, Robinson, Ghent		
4	12 June 1924	Dalymount Park, Dublin (H)	United States	3–1	Friendly	Brooks (3)		
5	21 March 1926	Motovelodromo, Turin (A)	Italy	0–3	Friendly			
6	23 April 1927	Lansdowne Road, Dublin (H)	Italy B	1–2	Friendly	Fullam		
7	12 February 1928	Stade Maurice Dufrasne, Liège (A)	Belgium	4–2	Friendly	White (2), Lacey, Sullivan		
8	30 April 1929	Dalymount Park, Dublin (H)	Belgium	4–0	Friendly	Flood (3) David Byrne		
9	11 May 1930	Stade Charles Malis, Brussels (A)	Belgium	3–1	Friendly	Jimmy Dunne (2), Flood		
10	26 April 1931	Estadi de Montjuïc, Barcelona (A)	Spain	1–1	Friendly	Moore		
11	13 December 1931	Dalymount Park, Dublin (H)	Spain	0–5	Friendly			
12	8 May 1932	Olympisch Stadion, Amsterdam (A)	Netherlands	2–0	Friendly	O'Reilly, Moore		
13	25 February 1934	Dalymount Park, Dublin (H)	Belgium	4–4	1934 FIFA World Cup qualification	Moore (4)	28,000	
14	8 April 1934	Olympisch Stadion, Amsterdam (A)	Netherlands	2–5	1934 FIFA World Cup qualification	Squires, Moore	38,000	
15	15 December 1934	Dalymount Park, Dublin (H)	Hungary	2–4	Friendly	Donnelly, Bermingham		
16	5 May 1935	Basel (A)	Switzerland	0–1	Friendly			
17	8 May 1935	Kampfbahn Rote Erde, Dortmund (A)	Germany	1–3	Friendly	Ellis		
18	8 December 1935	Dalymount Park, Dublin (H)	Netherlands	3–5	Friendly	Ellis, Horlacher (2)		

== Record by opponent ==
Team	Pld	W	D	L	GF	GA	GD	WPCT
Belgium	4	3	1	0	15	7	+8	75.00
Bulgaria	1	1	0	0	1	0	+1	100.00
Estonia	1	1	0	0	3	1	+2	100.00
Germany	1	0	0	1	1	3	−2	0.00
Hungary	1	0	0	1	2	4	−2	0.00
Italy	1	0	0	1	0	3	−3	0.00
Italy B	1	0	0	1	1	2	−1	0.00
Netherlands	4	1	0	3	8	12	−4	25.00
Spain	2	0	1	1	1	6	−5	0.00
Switzerland	1	0	0	1	0	1	−1	0.00
United States	1	1	0	0	3	1	+2	100.00
Total	18	7	2	9	35	40	−5	38.89

Source: Results

== See also ==
- Ireland national football team (FAI) results
