= Republic of Ireland national football team results (1954–1959) =

- Win Draw Loss

This article contains the results of the Republic of Ireland national football team during the 1950s. Between 1936 and 1954 the Football Association of Ireland referred to their team as Ireland. After a FIFA ruling they became the Republic of Ireland in 1954.

== Results ==
=== 1954 ===
7 November 1954 Friendly	Republic of Ireland	2–1	Norway	Dublin, Ireland
	Martin 59'; Ryan 66' (pen.)	(Report)	Olsen 13'	Stadium: Dalymount Park; Attendance: 34,000; Referee: Clough (England)

=== 1955 ===
1 May 1955 Friendly	Republic of Ireland	1–0	Netherlands	Dublin, Ireland
	Fitzgerald 79'	(Report)		Stadium: Dalymount Park; Attendance: 16,680; Referee: Luty (England)

25 May 1955 Friendly	Norway	1–3	Republic of Ireland	Oslo, Norway
	Kotte 39'	(Report)	Cummins 17', 70'; Ringstead 80'	Stadium: Bislett Stadium; Attendance: 18,547; Referee: Meissner (West Germany)

28 May 1955 Friendly	West Germany	2–1	Republic of Ireland	Hamburg, West Germany
	Waldner 13'; Mai 62'	(Report)	Fallon 67'	Stadium: Volksparkstadion; Attendance: 50,000; Referee: van der Meer (Netherlands)

19 October 1955 Friendly	Republic of Ireland	1–4	Yugoslavia	Dublin, Ireland
	Fitzsimons 40'	(Report)	Milutinović 10', 14', 44'; Veselinović 76'	Stadium: Dalymount Park; Attendance: 22,000; Referee: Murdock (England)

27 November 1955 Friendly	Republic of Ireland	2–2	Spain	Dublin, Ireland
	Fitzsimons 8'; Ringstead 76'	(Report)	Pahiño 24', 44'	Stadium: Dalymount Park; Attendance: 35,000; Referee: Ellis (England)

=== 1956 ===
10 May 1956 Friendly	Netherlands	1–4	Republic of Ireland	Rotterdam, Netherlands
	Appel 77'	(Report)	Fitzsimons 52', 67'; Haverty 59'; Ringstead 71'	Stadium: De Kuip; Attendance: 60,000; Referee: Alois Penning (West Germany)

3 October 1956 1958 FIFA World Cup qualification Group 1	Republic of Ireland	2–1	Denmark	Dublin, Ireland
	Curtis 28'; Gavin 44' (pen.)	(Report)	Aage Rou Jensen 86'	Stadium: Dalymount Park; Attendance: 32,600; Referee: Bond (England)

25 November 1956 Friendly	Republic of Ireland	3–0	West Germany	Dublin, Ireland
	Cantwell 62' (pen.); Haverty 87'; McCann 89'	(Report)		Stadium: Dalymount Park; Attendance: 35,000; Referee: Murdock (England)

=== 1957 ===
8 May 1957 1958 FIFA World Cup qualification Group 1	England	5–1	Republic of Ireland	London, England
	Taylor 10', 19', 40'; Atyeo 38', 90'	(Report)	Curtis 56'	Stadium: Wembley Stadium; Attendance: 51,000; Referee: Phillips (Scotland)

19 May 1957 1958 FIFA World Cup qualification Group 1	Republic of Ireland	1–1	England	Dublin, Ireland
	Ringstead 3'	(Report)	Atyeo 90'	Stadium: Dalymount Park; Attendance: 47,600; Referee: Phillips (Scotland)

2 October 1957 1958 FIFA World Cup qualification Group 1	Denmark	0–2	Republic of Ireland	Copenhagen, Denmark
		(Report)	Cummins 53'; Curtis 62'	Stadium: Idrætsparken; Attendance: 28,000; Referee: Schultz (East Germany)

=== 1958 ===
11 May 1958 Friendly	Poland	2–2	Republic of Ireland	Katowice, Poland
	Cieslik 25'; Zientara 74'		Curtis 12'; Cummins 49'	Stadium: Silesian Stadium; Attendance: 100,000; Referee: Romain (Austria)

14 May 1958 Friendly	Austria	3–1	Republic of Ireland	Vienna, Austria
	Körner 18'; Buzek 58'; Hamerl 77'		Curtis 70'	Stadium: Praterstadion; Attendance: 35,000; Referee: Wyssling (Switzerland)

15 October 1958 Friendly	Republic of Ireland	2–2	Poland	Dublin, Ireland
	Cantwell 26' (pen.), 31'		Pol 17', 19'	Stadium: Dalymount Park; Attendance: 24,000; Referee: Clough (England)

=== 1959 ===
5 April 1959 1960 European Nations' Cup qualifying	Republic of Ireland	2–0	Czechoslovakia	Dublin, Ireland
15:30 UTC+0	Tuohy 21'; Cantwell 41'			Stadium: Dalymount Park; Attendance: 37,500; Referee: Van Nuffel (Belgium)

10 May 1959 1960 European Nations' Cup qualifying	Czechoslovakia	4–0 (4–2 agg.)	Republic of Ireland	Bratislava, Czechoslovakia
16:00 UTC+1	Stacho 4' (pen.); Buberník 6'; Pavlovič 66'; Dolinský 75'			Stadium: Tehelné pole Attendance: 41,691; Referee: Barbéran (France)

1 November 1959 Friendly	Republic of Ireland	3–2	Sweden	Dublin, Ireland
	Giles 16'; Curtis 24', 53'		Borjesson 7'; Berndtsson 12'	Stadium: Dalymount Park; Attendance: 40,250; Referee: Holland (England)

== See also ==
- Ireland national football team (FAI) results
- Republic of Ireland national football team results (1960–1979)
