= Jeremiah Kelly =

British association football player (1900-1962)

Personal information
- Full name: Jeremiah Kelly
- Date of birth: 25 July 1900
- Place of birth: Cambuslang, Scotland
- Date of death: 24 September 1962 (aged 62)
- Place of death: East Kilbride, Scotland
- Height: 5 ft 10 in (1.78 m)
- Position: Right half

Senior career*
Years	Team	Apps	(Gls)
–	Blantyre Victoria		
1925–1927	Ayr United	68	(0)
1927–1930	Everton	81	(1)
1930–1931	Carlisle United	32	(0)
1931–1933	Dolphin		(3)
1933	Rennes	1	(0)
1933–1934	Glentoran		
1934–1935	Dunfermline Athletic	1	(0)
- * Club domestic league appearances and goals

Jeremiah Kelly (25 July 1900 – 24 September 1962) was a Scottish footballer who played as a right half.

== Career ==
Kelly was born and spent his early years in the mining village of Newton (Cambuslang parish); by the time of the 1911 census his family had moved a short distance to the hamlet of Caldervale (Blantyre parish). He began his career with local junior team Blantyre Victoria, joining his first Scottish Football League club Ayr United in January 1925 at the age of 24 (however that may not have been what was provided to the club – it was fairly common for players of the time to 'adjust' their age down, and in articles covering Kelly's later transfers his actual age was three years older than reported). He was unable to prevent the club's relegation from the top division in his first season, nor were the Honest Men (which at that time included some Scottish internationals in its ranks) able to climb out of the lower tier before he moved on.

Kelly switched to English football with Everton on 11 February 1927, making his debut in the Merseyside derby three days later. The following season he had a major role in the Toffees winning the 1927–28 Football League title, making 40 appearances and scoring one goal – a rare feat for him. In August 1930, having not played in the first team at Goodison Park since the previous autumn and the club having been relegated, he signed for Carlisle United of the Football League Third Division North to be deployed at centre half. He departed a year later (due to Carlisle being unable to pay any wages during the summer close season owing to their weak financial position) and crossed the Irish Sea to play for and manage Dolphin, leading them to the final of the FAI Cup in both 1931–32 and 1932–33, but losing to Shamrock Rovers on both occasions.

In 1933 he was invited to play for Rennes in France, their newly appointed player-manager at the time being former Ayr teammate Philip McCloy. However, both men only remained there for a matter of weeks: accounts of Kelly's debut performance against Montpellier were so poor that the directors decided to cancel his contract immediately, and McCloy also resigned in protest at this. Kelly spent the next 16 months in Belfast playing for Glentoran, then returned to Scotland with Dunfermline Athletic, but this was short deal which involved only one league appearance.
