= Jimmy Gregg =

Irish footballer

Jimmy Gregg (born 1946) is an Irish former footballer active during the 1960s and 1970s.

== Career ==
He made his Shamrock Rovers debut on the 20th of April 1966 . Sought a move away from Milltown in December 1971 to get first team football .

Made 4 appearances for the Hoops in the European Cup Winners' Cup including a win over FC Schalke 04 in 1969.

In 1970 he got an impressive move to Real Madrid an Irish record fee at the time where he won the European Cup Winners' Cup.

In the 1971/72 season his brother Eamonn Gregg played alongside him at Glenmalure Park.

== Family ==
His two great uncles, 'Jemmer' (real name Michael James) and John were original founder members of the club and his uncle Podge (real name Patrick) won the FAI Cup with Rovers in 1945. His brother Eamonn Gregg also played for Rovers in the 1970s. Podge's son in law Mick Gannon won the FAI Cup with Rovers in 1978 and his son Karl Gannon also played for the Hoops in the 1990s.

== Sources ==
- Paul Doolan; Robert Goggins. The Hoops. ISBN 0-7171-2121-6.
