= Eamonn Gregg =

Irish footballer and manager

Personal information
- Full name: Eamonn Gregg
- Date of birth: 30 January 1953 (age 73)
- Place of birth: Dublin, Ireland
- Height: 5 ft 9 in (1.75 m)
- Position: Defender

Senior career*
Years	Team	Apps	(Gls)
1971–1973	Shamrock Rovers	43	(0)
1973–1980	Bohemians	180	(1)
1980–1981	VfB Lübeck	?	(?)
1981–1983	Dundalk	55	(1)
1983–1989	St Patrick's Athletic	83	(2)
1987–1988	Shamrock Rovers(loan)	8	(0)
1989–1990	Kilkenny City	16	(0)

International career
1978–1979	Republic of Ireland	8	(0)
1979–1986	League of Ireland XI	?	(1)

Managerial career
- 1989–1990: Kilkenny City
- 1990–1993: Bohemians
- 1994: Shelbourne
- * Club domestic league appearances and goals

Eamonn Gregg (born 28 March 1953 in Dublin) was an Irish football player during the 1970s and 1980s.

== Playing career ==
He played for Shamrock Rovers, Bohemians, VfB Lübeck, Dundalk, St Patrick's Athletic and Kilkenny City during his career. He made 180 league appearances and 15 European appearances for Bohs during his 8 seasons at Dalymount Park after signing for Bohs in 1972. He left Bohs in 1980 and had a short spell at VfB Lübeck in Germany before returning to Ireland the following year where he joined Dundalk. While at Oriel Park, he added a third league winners medal. Eamonn moved to St. Pats during the 1983/84 and stayed there until 1989, apart from a short spell on loan at Shamrock Rovers in 1987/88. After Pats, he wound down his playing career as player/manager at Kilkenny where he made 16 league appearances.

== International career ==
He won 8 full international caps for Ireland after making his debut against Poland in 1976. All of his caps came while at Bohemians.

== Managerial career ==
Gregg has managed Kilkenny City (1989–90), Bohemians (1990–1993) and Shelbourne (1994). He joined Kilkenny as player/manager in 1989 and brought renowned coach Maurice Price with him. The pair led "The Cats" to their best ever league position up to that point. This was noted by the hierarchy at Bohs and in May 1990, he was offered the managers job at Dalymount and he duly accepted. While at Bohs, he won the FAI Cup and came agonisingly close to ending the club long spell without a league title when Bohs lost the league title on a play-off in 1992/93. He never recovered from that disappointment and by December of that year, he was gone from Bohemians. Gregg's next port of call was Shelbourne in January 1994 but his time at the club was a failure and he was sacked in November 1994.

== Trivia ==
The Gregg name is synonymous with Shamrock Rovers. His two great uncles, 'Jemmer' (real name Michael James) and John were original founder members of the club and his uncle Podge (real name Patrick) won the FAI Cup with Rovers in 1945. His brother Jimmy Gregg also played for Rovers in the 1970s. Podge's son in law Mick Gannon won the FAI Cup with Rovers in 1978 and his son Karl Gannon also played for the Hoops in the 1990s.
