= Larry Doyle =

Larry Doyle may refer to:

- Larry Doyle (baseball) (1886–1974), Major League Baseball player from the early 20th century
- Larry Doyle (blogger), financial blogger
- Larry Doyle (writer) (born 1958), writer/producer who has worked in movies, animation, and television including The Simpsons
- Larry Doyle (footballer), Irish footballer
