= Mike Gallagher (footballer) =

Irish footballer (died 1984)

Personal information
- Full name: Michael Gallagher
- Place of birth: Arranmore, County Donegal, Ireland
- Date of death: 1984
- Place of death: U.S.
- Position: Half back

Senior career*
Years	Team	Apps	(Gls)
?–1948	Alloa Athletic		
1948–1954	Hibernian	49	(0)
1954–1957	Ayr United	74	
1958–?	Weymouth		

International career
1954	Republic of Ireland	1	(0)
- * Club domestic league appearances and goals

Michael Gallagher (died 1984), sometimes referred to as Mike, Matthew, Matt or Mick Gallagher, was a footballer who played for Republic of Ireland and Hibernian. He was the first player from County Donegal to be capped for the Republic of Ireland national team.

Born in Arranmore, County Donegal, he played gaelic football with Rosses GAA club before he began his soccer career in Scotland.

He helped Hibernian win two Scottish League titles in 1950–51 and 1951–52 before being picked for the Republic of Ireland in March 1954 for what proved to be his only international appearance, a 1–0 win over Luxembourg in a World Cup qualifying game.
