= Alf Cooper =

Irish American cricketer (born 1932)

Personal information
- Full name: Alfred William Madison Cooper
- Born: 12 June 1932; Dublin, Ireland
- Died: 27 July 2023 (aged 91)
- Batting: Right-handed
- Bowling: Right-arm fast-medium

International information
- National sides: Ireland; United States

Career statistics
Competition	First-class
Matches	1
Runs scored	50
Batting average	25.00
100s/50s	0/0
Top score	31
Balls bowled	66
Wickets	2
Bowling average	19.00
5 wickets in innings	0
10 wickets in match	0
Best bowling	2/35
Catches/stumpings	0/–
- Source: CricketArchive, 22 January 2011

Alfred William Madison Cooper (12 June 1932 – 27 July 2023) was an Irish and American international cricketer. A right-handed batsman and right-arm fast-medium bowler, he played twice for Ireland, a first-class match against the MCC in September 1954 after making his debut against Lancashire earlier in the year. He later represented the USA national team, playing for them on a tour to England in 1968.
