= Paddy Farrell =

Irish footballer (1912–1987)

Personal information
- Full name: Patrick Farrell
- Date of birth: 2 February 1912
- Place of birth: Athlone, Ireland
- Date of death: 19 March 1987 (aged 75)
- Place of death: Hull, England
- Height: 5 ft 8 in (1.73 m)
- Position: Inside forward

Youth career
- Home Farm

Senior career*
Years	Team	Apps	(Gls)
1932–1935	Bohemians		
1935–1939	Hibernian		
1939–1940	Alloa Athletic		

International career
1937	Ireland (FAI)	2	(0)
1938	Ireland (IFA)	1	(0)
- * Club domestic league appearances and goals

Paddy Farrell (2 February 1912 – 19 March 1987) was an Irish footballer who played for Bohemians and Hibernian during the 1930s. He was born in Athlone, Ireland. As an international he also played for both Ireland teams – the FAI XI and the IFA XI. At the outbreak of the Second World War, Farrell joined the RAF and after completing his service set up a dental practice in Hull.

== Club career ==
=== Bohemians ===
Farrell began his career playing junior football with Home Farm before joining Bohemians where his teammates included Fred Horlacher and Billy Jordan. He was initially restricted to the reserves until coach Bill Lacey spotted a fault in his running style. Intensive coaching corrected the problem and Farrell subsequently played a prominent role in Bohs FAI Cup run during the 1934–35 season. Farrell first scored in the 5-2 second round win against Waterford United. He also scored the winner in the semi-final replay against that seasons eventual League of Ireland champions, Dolphins. Farrell played in the final against Dundalk but had to go off injured with over 30 minutes remaining. Despite this, the remaining 10 men held on for a 4–3 win.

=== Hibernian ===
Farrell's performances in the FAI Cup soon attracted the attention of Hibernian. His mother initially had doubts about the move but was impressed with the terms offered. As well as an £800 signing on fee, Farrell was also to attend the University of Edinburgh where he would study dentistry with Hibs paying the fees and arranging training around his lectures.

== Irish international ==
When Farrell played international football between 1937 and 1938, there were in effect, two Ireland teams, chosen by two rival associations. The IFA and the FAI both claimed jurisdiction over the whole of Ireland and selected players from the whole island. As a result, several notable Irish players from this era, including Farrell, played for both teams.

=== FAI XI ===
In 1937 Farrell made two appearances for the FAI XI. In May 1937 the FAI organised a European tour with a squad that included Tommy Breen, Jackie Brown and Jimmy Dunne as well as Farrell. Farrell made his debut for the FAI XI on 17 May in a 1–0 win against Switzerland. A week later, on 23 May, he also helped the FAI XI defeat France 2–0. This would prove to be his last appearance for the FAI XI.

=== IFA XI ===
On 16 March 1938 Farrell made his only appearance for the IFA XI in a 1–0 win against Wales at Windsor Park.

== Honours ==
Bohemians

- FAI Cup
  - Winners 1935: 1

== After football ==
At the outbreak of the Second World War, Farrell enlisted in the Royal Air Force. After the war was over, he used his dentistry training to set up a practice in Hull.
