= Charlie Reid (footballer) =

Irish footballer

Personal information
- Full name: Charles Reid
- Date of birth: 16 July 1910
- Place of birth: Dublin
- Date of death: 23 March 1992 (aged 81)
- Place of death: Dublin
- Position: Forward

Senior career*
Years	Team	Apps	(Gls)
1929–1932	Brideville		(26)
1932–1934	Dolphin		(3)
1934–1937	Shamrock Rovers		(21)
1936–1937	Brideville		(1)
1937–1939	St James's Gate		(13)
1939–1940	Distillery		(0)
1940–1941	Dundalk	20	(3)

International career
1931	Ireland	1	(0)
- * Club domestic league appearances and goals

Charles Reid was an Ireland international footballer. Reid played for several clubs in the League of Ireland and won two FAI Cup winners medals (Shamrock Rovers 1936 and St James's Gate 1938) and another 2 runners-up medals (Brideville 1930 and Dolphin 1933).

== International career ==
In April 1931, Reid made his only appearance for Ireland in a 1–1 draw with Spain in the Estadio de Montjuic, Barcelona.
