= Paddy Andrews =

Irish footballer (1913–1981)

Personal information
- Full name: Patrick Andrews
- Date of birth: 13 November 1913
- Place of birth: Dublin
- Date of death: 1981 (aged 67–68)
- Position: Midfielder

Senior career*
Years	Team	Apps	(Gls)
- Drumcondra
- UCD
- Bohemians

International career
	Republic of Ireland	1	(0)
- * Club domestic league appearances and goals

Patrick Andrews (13 November 1913 – 1981) was an Irish footballer who played as a midfielder in the League of Ireland.

Andrews was a part of the Bohemians amateur team of the late 1920s and early 1930s. He won full international caps for Irish Free State, making his debut against the Netherlands alongside fellow Bohemian players Fred Horlacher, Bill McGuire and Plev Ellis.

== Early years ==
Andrews was educated at Synge Street CBS where he played Gaelic games and was a tremendous athlete, winning five All-Ireland schools championship titles in athletics. He made the Dublin junior Gaelic football team in the late 1920s but had to give up the sport because of the ban on "foreign games". He so began a career in football by signing for Drumcondra.

Andrews spent two years at Drums before signing for UCD where he also studied. During his time at the college, he showed his all-round sporting ability by winning titles in discus and shot put and playing both cricket and tennis.

== Bohemians ==
Andrews signed for Bohs after UCD where he went on to win the League of Ireland and the FAI Cup, as well as the League of Ireland Shield. in 1936, he became the 40th man to be appointed Bohemian F.C. captain. He remained close to the club throughout his life as a full member of the club.

Andrews died in 1981.

== Honours ==
Bohemians

- League of Ireland: 1933–34, 1935–36
- FAI Cup: 1935
- League of Ireland Shield: 1934
