= Jimmy Connolly (footballer) =

Irish footballer

Personal information
- Position: Half back

Senior career*
Years	Team	Apps	(Gls)
- Fordsons

International career
1926	Irish Free State	1	(0)
- * Club domestic league appearances and goals

Jimmy Connolly was an Ireland international footballer.

== International career ==
On 21 March 1926, Connolly made his only appearance for Ireland in a 3–0 defeat to Italy in Turin.
