= Larry Doyle (footballer) =

Irish footballer

Personal information
- Full name: Laurence Doyle
- Position: Defender

Youth career
- Edenville

Senior career*
Years	Team	Apps	(Gls)
–1937	Dolphin	?	(?)
1937–	St James's Gate F.C.	?	(?)
	St Joseph's, Glasthule	?	(?)

International career
1931	Republic of Ireland	1	(0)
- * Club domestic league appearances and goals

Larry Doyle was an Irish footballer who played for Dolphin and St James's Gate.

He won a junior cap for Ireland in 1927 and he also played for the Ireland senior football team on just one occasion when appeared at left back in a 5–0 defeat to Spain in Dalymount Park, Dublin on 13 December 1931.

== Honours ==
- League of Ireland
  - Winner: 1934–35: 1
  - Runner Up: 1935–36: 1
- Dublin City Cup
  - 1934-35: 1
- Leinster Senior League
  - 1929-30, 1930-31: 2
- Leinster Senior Cup
  - Winner: 1931-32: 1
  - Runner Up: 1930–31, 1932–33: 2
- FAI Cup : 1
  - Winner:1937–38
  - Runner Up: 1931–32, 1932–33: 2
- League of Ireland Shield
  - Runner Up: 1934–35: 1
