= Joe Kinsella =

Republic of Ireland footballer

Personal information
- Full name: Joseph Kinsella
- Position: Half back

Senior career*
Years	Team	Apps	(Gls)
- Shelbourne

International career
1928	Ireland	1	(0)
- * Club domestic league appearances and goals

Joe Kinsella was an Ireland international footballer.

== International career ==
On 12 February 1928, Kinsella made his only appearance for Ireland in a 4–2 win over Belgium in Liège.
