= Jim Buchanan (footballer) =

Scottish footballer

Personal information
- Full name: James Buchanan
- Date of birth: 10 October 1898
- Place of birth: Kirkliston, Scotland
- Date of death: After April, 25, 1936
- Position: Inside forward

Senior career*
Years	Team	Apps	(Gls)
19xx–1920	Broxburn United	?	(?)
1920–1924	Hibernian	32	(10)
1924–1928	Bournemouth & Boscombe Athletic	65	(10)
1925	→ Raith Rovers (loan)	0	(0)
1928	East Stirlingshire	?	(?)
1928–1930	Nelson	66	(15)
1930	Clitheroe	?	(?)
1930	Accrington Stanley	?	(?)
1930–1932	Bray Unknowns	?	(?)
1932–1935	Shamrock Rovers	?	(?)
1935–1936	Bangor	?	(?)
- * Club domestic league appearances and goals

Jim Buchanan (born 10 October 1898, date of death unknown) was a Scottish professional footballer who played as an inside forward, or occasionally as an outside forward.

== Playing career ==
As a youth, Buchanan played junior football with Bellstone Birds and Winchburgh Violet, before joining Broxburn United. Throughout his early career, he played predominantly as a centre forward, but was converted to an outside forward when he signed for Hibernian in December 1920. During his time at Easter Road, Buchanan was an understudy to the Scottish international Harry Ritchie. With Hibernian, he won several trophies, including the East of Scotland Shield. In May 1924, Buchanan moved to England to join Football League Third Division South club Bournemouth & Boscombe Athletic, although he briefly returned to Scotland in June 1925 for a loan spell with Raith Rovers. In four seasons with Bournemouth, he made 65 league appearances and scored 10 goals.

Buchanan returned to Scotland when he joined East Stirlingshire in August 1928, but his stay was again fleeting as he moved back to England to play for Third Division North outfit Nelson the following month. He made his debut for Nelson on 13 October 1928 in the 3–4 defeat to Barrow at Seedhill. Two matches later, he scored his first goal for the club in the 4–2 win against Rotherham United. He went on to make 32 appearances for Nelson during the 1928–29 campaign, scoring six goals, including two penalty kicks. During the following season, he scored a further nine league goals in 34 matches, including a brace in the 3–1 victory over York City on 14 September 1929. Buchanan played his final game for Nelson on 3 May 1930, in the 5–1 loss away at Wrexham.

Upon leaving Nelson, Buchanan moved into English non-League football with Clitheroe. However, after a short spell with the club he returned to the Third Division North with Accrington Stanley in October 1930. However, in three months with the side he failed to make a single first-team appearance and subsequently moved to Ireland to play for Bray Unknowns. Buchanan then had a three-year spell with Shamrock Rovers between August 1932 and August 1935 scoring in the 1932–33 FAI Cup Final.

He ended his career with Bangor, retiring at the culmination of the 1935–36 season.

== Honours ==
Shamrock Rovers

- FAI Cup: 1933
- League of Ireland Shield: 1932–33, 1934–35
- Leinster Senior Cup: 1933
