= Riversdale, Rathfarnham =

A former Dublin home of William Butler Yeats

Riversdale was the last home of William Butler Yeats. It is located in the Dublin suburb of Rathfarnham off the Ballyboden Road.

== W. B. Yeats ==
He took a 13-year lease on the house in 1932. He lived there with his wife and children. It was at Riversdale that he mourned for Lady Gregory after her death, that he had his last meeting with Maud Gonne (1938) and that he met with Irish fascist Eoin O'Duffy. Two of his poems, "What Then?" and "An Acre Of Grass" are about Riversdale.

== Recent developments ==
Developers bought the house in the late 1990s and applied for planning permission to build "60 High Quality Residential Units" on the site. As a result of action by local residents the planning permission was refused. Eventually the developers succeeded in getting planning permission for three four-bedroom luxury detached homes and three single-storey two-bedroom mews-type houses.
