= Bill McGuire (footballer) =

Irish footballer

Bill McGuire was an Irish footballer who played as a defender during the 1930s.

McGuire was a part of the Bohemians amateur team of the 1930s.

He won full international caps for the Irish Free State making his debut against Holland alongside fellow Bohemian players Fred Horlacher, Paddy Andrews and Plev Ellis.

== Honours ==
Bohemians

- FAI Cup: 1934–35
