= 1931–32 FAI Cup =

Tournament details
- Country: Ireland
- Dates: 27 December 1931 – 17 April 1932

Final positions
- Champions: Shamrock Rovers (5th title)
- Runners-up: Dolphin
- Semifinalists: Bohemians; Shelbourne

The FAI Cup 1931/32^{[A]} was the eleventh edition of Ireland's premier cup competition, The Football Association of Ireland Challenge Cup or FAI Cup. The tournament began on 27 December 1931 and concluded on 17 April 1932 with the final held at Dalymount Park, Dublin. An official attendance^{[B]} of 32,000 people watched Shamrock Rovers claim the fourth of five FAI Cup titles in a row by defeating Dolphin.

== First round ==
Tie no	Home team	Score	Away team	Date
1	Drumcondra	3–1	Cork Bohemians	27 December 1931
2	Bohemians	8–0	Cobh Ramblers	9 January 1932
3	Bray Unknowns	1–2	Cork	9 January 1932
4	Edenville	2–1	Jacobs	9 January 1932
5	Shamrock Rovers	9–3	Ormeau	9 January 1932
6	Brideville	1–4	Waterford	10 January 1932
7	Dundalk	1–2	Shelbourne	10 January 1932
8	St James's Gate	0–10	Dolphin	10 January 1932

== Second round ==
Tie no	Home team	Score	Away team	Date
1	Bohemians	2–0	Drumcondra	6 February 1932
2	Shamrock Rovers	4–2	Edenville	6 February 1932
3	Dolphin	3–2	Cork	7 February 1932
4	Shelbourne	4–2	Waterford	7 February 1932

== Semi–finals ==
5 March, 1932

Shamrock Rovers	3–2	Bohemians
Moore (2); Smith		Horlacher; Foy

Iveagh Grounds, Crumlin, Dublin

27 March, 1932

Dolphin	3–1	Shelbourne
Somers; Smith; Paterson		Jones

Glenmalure Park, Milltown, Dublin

== Final ==
17 April, 1932

Shamrock Rovers	1 - 0	Dolphin
Moore

Dalymount Park, Dublin
Attendance: 32,000

Winner of FAI Cup 1931/32
Shamrock Rovers
5th Title

== Notes ==
A. From 1923 to 1936, the FAI Cup was known as the Free State Cup.

B. Attendances were calculated using gate receipts which limited their accuracy as a large proportion of people, particularly children, attended football matches in Ireland throughout the 20th century for free by a number of means.
