= Billy Jordan =

Irish footballer

Billy Jordan was an Irish association football player during the 1930s.

== Club career ==
Jordan began his footballing life at St Francis who played in the St Dominic's Boys Sodality League. He joined Bohs from Villa Rangers in 1928/29. Jordan was a skilful inside left but had to bide his time in the Bohemian "B" and "C" teams before he made his first team début in December 1931 when Fred Horlacher was away on inter-League duty with the League of Ireland in Wales.

He became a permanent name in the starting line up from the 1933/34 season on as either inside or outside left. Jordan's "arrival" that 33/34 season coincided with another Billy being appointed coach - Bill Lacey. It was Lacey who shrewdly gave Fred Horlacher a new lease of life by moving him back to left half (what might be regarded as a defensive midfield position nowadays) and installed Jordan at inside left. It would prove Jordan's best scoring season, for he scored 16 goals in all competitions as Bohs won the Shield and then the League.

Jordan stayed on the left wing during 34/35 and played in a dramatic FAI Cup final against Dundalk though suffering from a knee injury. Bohs were reduced to ten men several times during the match, permanently so with over half an hour to play as the injured Paddy Farrell couldn't continue, but they held on with their backs to the wall for a 4-3 win and it still remains the highest scoring final in its long history. Jordan scored two goals within a minute during the first half to help Bohs on their way.

Jordan gave Bohemians ten seasons as a first-teamer. He clocked up exactly 100 League appearances from which he scored 37 goals, bowing out at the end of the 1940/41 season. In all he made 192 first team appearances in all competitions, scoring 67 goals.

He came from a sporting family as his brothers Andy and Danny also had long spells at Bohemians.

== International career ==
Jordan earned his first full international cap for the Irish Free State on 8 April 1934 against Netherlands in a 5-2 defeat. Unfortunately for Jordan, he was injured and had to be replaced by fellow Bohemian Fred Horlacher. This was the first substitution ever to take place in an Irish international match.

His second cap came in October 1937 in a World Cup tie that ended 3-2 to Norway in Oslo.

== Death ==
Jordan died on 8 October 2000, aged 91.

== Honours ==
- League of Ireland: 2
  - Bohemians - 1933/34, 1935/36
- FAI Cup: 1
  - Bohemians - 1935
- League of Ireland Shield: 1
  - Bohemians - 1934
- 2 Full Irish International Caps
