= Willie Fallon =

Irish footballer (1912–1989)

Personal information
- Full name: William Joseph Fallon
- Date of birth: 14 January 1912
- Place of birth: Larne
- Date of death: 23 March 1989 (aged 77)
- Place of death: Nottingham, England
- Height: 5 ft 9 in (1.75 m)
- Position: Outside left

Senior career*
Years	Team	Apps	(Gls)
1930–1932	Brideville		
1932–1934	Dolphin		
1934–1938	Notts County	120	(20)
1938–1939	Sheffield Wednesday	45	(12)
1939–1940	→ Shamrock Rovers (loan)		
1940–1944	→ Shelbourne (loan)		
1944–1946	→ Dundalk (loan)	24	(11)
1946–1947	Notts County	15	(3)
1947–1948	Exeter City	8	(2)
1948–1950	Peterborough United		

International career
1934–1939	Ireland	9	(2)
1943–1946	League of Ireland XI	6	(0)
- * Club domestic league appearances and goals

William Joseph Fallon (14 January 1912 – 23 March 1989) was an Ireland international footballer. His career spanned twenty years during the 1930s and 1940s. Fallon played for several clubs in the English League, most notably Notts County and Sheffield Wednesday, and in the League of Ireland. He won an FAI Cup winners medal and League of Ireland title with Shamrock Rovers and Shelbourne respectively. He also scored in three FAI Cup finals for three different teams – Dolphin, Shamrock Rovers and Shelbourne.

== Club career ==
=== Early years ===
Fallon originally played Gaelic football before he joined Brideville. While playing for Dolphin he made the first of three scoring appearances in FAI Cup finals. Fallon played in the 1932–33 FAI Cup final against Shamrock Rovers. His Dolphin teammates included Joe Kendrick and Jeremiah Robinson. Fallon scored in the 3–3 draw but Dolphin lost the replay 3–0.

=== Notts County ===
Fallon signed for Notts County in February 1934. Between 1934 and 1938 he made 120 English League appearances and scored 20 goals. Fallon returned to County for a second spell in 1946–47 making a further 15 league appearances and scoring 3 goals.

=== Sheffield Wednesday ===
Fallon signed for Sheffield Wednesday from Notts County for a transfer few of £3,000 plus Jack Roy. He was signed by Wednesday manager Jimmy McMullan as a replacement for Ellis Rimmer. He made his debut for Wednesday on 19 March 1938 in a 1–0 home defeat to Barnsley, playing in all ten of the remaining League games of that 1937–38 season. He formed an exciting left wing partnership with Charlie Napier in the 1938–39 season, appearing in 40 matches in all competitions, scoring 11 goals as Wednesday missed out on promotion from the Second Division to city rivals Sheffield United by one point. One of Fallon's best displays for Wednesday was against Norwich City in November 1938 when he teased and tormented the Canaries' defence in a 7–0 win. Fallon had a lucky escape just before Christmas 1938 when the car he was travelling in, together with fellow Wednesday player Ted Catlin, skidded in snow at Wadsley Bridge and hit a telegraph pole. Both players went to hospital and were out of the team for several weeks. On 2 September 1939 Fallon appeared in the final Sheffield Wednesday match before the outbreak of the Second World War against Plymouth Argyle. After the war Fallon returned to Wednesday, but he did not figure in their plans and was given a free transfer back to Notts County in June 1946.

=== League of Ireland ===
Following the outbreak of the Second World War, Fallon returned to Ireland where he joined the Irish Army and played for three different clubs – Shamrock Rovers, Shelbourne and Dundalk. He played for Rovers during the 1939–40 season, helping them win the FAI Cup. Fallon scored in the 3–0 win in the final against Sligo Rovers. The 1940–41 season saw Fallon switch to Shelbourne. During the 1943–44 season Fallon helped Shels win a league double, winning both the league itself and the League of Ireland Shield. Shels almost won a treble but lost 3–2 to Shamrock Rovers in the FAI Cup final. Fallon did however manage to score his third FAI Cup final goal.

=== Exeter City ===
In the 1947–48 season Fallon played for Exeter City. Among his teammates at City was his younger brother, Peter Fallon, who also played for Notts County and Queens Park Rangers in the 1940s.

=== Peterborough United ===
Fallon finished his playing career with Peterborough United, then playing in the Midland Football League. His career ended when he suffered a broken collar bone playing for Peterborough reserves against Notts County.

== International career ==
=== Ireland ===
Between 1934 and 1939 Fallon made nine appearances and scored twice for Ireland. He made his first five appearances while playing for Notts County and his last four while playing for Sheffield Wednesday. Fallon made his international debut on 16 December 1934 in a 4–2 home defeat against Hungary. Fallon's first three international appearances were all against the same opponents. Fallon scored his first goal for Ireland on 6 December 1936 against Hungary. He opened the scoring after twenty minutes with a long range effort. However Hungary eventually won 3–2. He scored his second in a 3–2 win against Poland on 13 November 1938. Once again he opened the scoring, this time after ten minutes. Two minutes later he provided Johnny Carey with an assist from a corner to make it 2–0. During his time playing for Ireland, Fallon also featured in two European tours. In May 1937 Fallon played in away games against Switzerland and France. In May 1939 he also played in away games against Hungary and Germany. These were the last two games Ireland played before the outbreak of the Second World War.

=== League of Ireland XI ===
During the Second World War Fallon also played for the League of Ireland XI. During The Emergency, the League of Ireland XI played regularly against the Irish League XI and the Irish Army XI. During the 1941–42 season Fallon also played for the Irish Army XI against the League of Ireland XI and helped the Army team win 4–1.

== Personal life ==
After retirement from football, Fallon lived in the Nottingham area and worked in the building trade. He died on 23 March 1989.

== Honours ==
Shamrock Rovers

- FAI Cup: 1940

Shelbourne

- League of Ireland: 1943-44
- League of Ireland Shield: 1943-44

== Sources ==
- Dave Galvin; Gerry Desmond. Irish Football Handbook. ISBN 0-9517987-3-1.
