= Eddie Gannon =

Irish footballer

Personal information
- Full name: Edward Gannon
- Date of birth: 31 January 1921
- Date of death: 27 November 2006 (aged 78)
- Place of death: Dublin, Ireland
- Position: Defender

Senior career*
| Years | Team | Apps | (Gls) |
- Shelbourne
- Distillery
- Shelbourne
- Notts County
- Sheffield Wednesday
- Shelbourne
- Transport F.C.

International career
| 1948–1955 | Republic of Ireland | 14 | (0) |
- * Club domestic league appearances and goals

Eddie Gannon (3 January 1921 – 31 July 1989) was an Irish professional footballer.

== Career ==
He began his career in his native city with Shelbourne before transferring to Distillery then back to Shelbourne before signing for Notts County in August 1946.

He made a big impression in Nottingham and was transferred to Sheffield Wednesday in March 1949.

After a successful career, Eddie returned to Shelbourne where he acted as player manager from 1955 until 1957.

Signed for Transport F.C. in February 1957 .

He also won 14 caps for the Republic of Ireland national football team, his first appearance coming on 5 December 1948 in a 1–0 loss to Switzerland. He played for the Republic of Ireland between 1948 and 1955

His nephew Mick Gannon was later capped by his country as well.
