= List of Republic of Ireland international footballers born outside the Republic of Ireland =

The Republic of Ireland national football team, as governed by the Football Association of Ireland, has featured many players who were not born in the Ireland. The first player to be capped after qualifying through his parents' nationality was Shay Brennan, who made his debut in a World Cup qualifier against Spain in 1965.

The majority of these players were born in England, mostly the North West and London due to the large Irish diaspora in those areas. Most famously, in the late 1980s and 1990s the Republic of Ireland manager Jack Charlton sought out players in England and used what became known as the "granny rule", with the stronger pool of talent helping the team to qualify for several tournaments, which had never been achieved prior to Charlton's appointment. There were a few England-born internationals in the squads of that era who had been raised in Ireland and learned to play football at local clubs, not least Paul McGrath and David O'Leary as well as Curtis Fleming and Stephen McPhail.

== United Kingdom ==
=== England ===
- John Aldridge
- Harry Arter
- Finn Azaz
- Phil Babb
- Joel Bagan
- Leon Best
- Keith Branagan
- Gary Breen
- Shay Brennan
- Alex Bruce (also played for Northern Ireland)
- Paul Butler
- John Byrne
- Tom Cannon
- Lee Carsley
- Tony Cascarino
- Jeff Chandler
- Cyrus Christie
- Ciaran Clark
- James Collins
- David Connolly
- Conor Coventry
- Simon Cox
- Josh Cullen
- Ronan Curtis
- Liam Daish
- Rory Delap
- John Dempsey
- Terry Donovan
- Owen Elding
- Rob Elliot
- Mickey Evans
- Will Ferry
- Rory Finneran
- Curtis Fleming
- Caleb Folan
- Kevin Foley
- Tony Galvin
- Jon Goodman
- Tony Grealish
- Paul Green
- CJ Hamilton
- Austin Hayes
- Ron Healey
- Joe Hodge
- Scott Hogan
- Matt Holland
- Chris Hughton
- Will Keane
- Mick Kearns
- Alan Kelly Jr.
- David Kelly
- Mark Kelly
- Mick Kennedy
- Paddy Kenny
- Richard Keogh
- Alan Kernaghan
- Dean Kiely
- Kevin Kilbane
- Liam Kitching
- Liam Lawrence
- Mark Lawrenson
- Jon Macken
- Sean Maguire
- Terry Mancini
- Jason McAteer
- Kasey McAteer
- Mick McCarthy
- Jim McDonagh
- David McGoldrick
- Eddie McGoldrick
- Paul McGrath
- Mark McGuinness
- Alan McLoughlin
- Stephen McPhail
- Mike Milligan
- Chris Morris
- Clinton Morrison
- Jerry Murphy
- Aiden O'Brien
- Andy O'Brien
- Brendan O'Callaghan
- Kevin O'Callaghan
- Joe O'Cearuill
- Callum O'Dowda
- Sean O'Driscoll
- Kelham O'Hanlon
- Kieran O'Hara
- Eamonn O'Keefe
- David O'Leary
- Max O'Leary
- Alex Pearce
- Gerry Peyton
- Terry Phelan
- Anthony Pilkington
- Darren Potter
- Steven Reid
- Declan Rice
- Callum Robinson
- Michael Robinson
- Martin Rowlands
- John Sheridan
- Will Smallbone
- Sean St Ledger
- Sammie Szmodics
- Jack Taylor
- Peter Thomas
- Andy Townsend
- Harvey Vale
- Gary Waddock
- Mickey Walsh
- Mike Walsh
- Jonathan Walters
- Keiren Westwood

=== Scotland ===
- Owen Coyle
- Tommy Coyne
- Charlie Gallagher
- Ray Houghton
- Mikey Johnston
- James McCarthy
- Aiden McGeady
- Bernie Slaven
- Rocco Vata

=== Wales ===
- Kevin Sheedy

== Rest of the world ==
=== Germany ===
- Derrick Williams

=== Nigeria ===
- Chiedozie Ogbene

=== Spain ===
- John Patrick

=== United States ===
- Joseph Lapira
- Killian Phillips

== See also ==
- List of dual Irish international footballers
