= 1932–33 FAI Cup =

Tournament details
- Country: Ireland
- Dates: 27 December 1931 - 17 April 1932

Final positions
- Champions: Shamrock Rovers (6th title)
- Runners-up: Dolphin
- Semifinalists: Bohemians; Shelbourne

The FAI Cup 1932/33^{[A]} was the twelfth edition of Ireland's premier cup competition, The Football Association of Ireland Challenge Cup or FAI Cup. The tournament began on 26 December 1932 and concluded on 26 March 1933 with the final replay held at Dalymount Park, Dublin. An official attendance^{[B]} of 18,000 people watched Shamrock Rovers claim their fifth FAI Cup title in a row by defeating Dolphin.

== First round ==
Tie no	Home team	Score	Away team	Date
1	Tramore Rookies	0-8	Drumcondra	26 December 1932
2	Shelbourne	5-0	Jacobs	31 December 1932
3	Bray Unknowns	0-0	Cork Bohemians	1 January 1933
replay	Cork Bohemians	0-0^{[C]}	Bray Unknowns	4 January 1933
refix^{[C]}	Cork Bohemians	2-2	Bray Unknowns	11 January 1933
replay(2)	Bray Unknowns	1-2	Cork Bohemians	18 January 1933
4	Cork	6-1	Rossville	1 January 1933
5	Dundalk	1-1	Dolphin	1 January 1933
replay	Dolphin	2-1	Dundalk	4 January 1933
6	Shamrock Rovers	3-1	St James's Gate	1 January 1933
7	Sligo Rovers	3-1	Brideville	1 January 1933
8	Waterford	0-4	Bohemians	1 January 1933

== Second round ==
Tie no	Home team	Score	Away team	Date
1	Bohemians	7-1	Cork Bohemians	21 January 1933
2	Cork	1-1	Shamrock Rovers	22 January 1933
replay	Shamrock Rovers	3-0	Cork	25 January 1933
3	Dolphin	2-1	Drumcondra	22 January 1933
4	Shelbourne	5-2	Sligo Rovers	22 January 1933

== Semi-finals ==
11 February, 1933

Shamrock Rovers	3 - 1	Bohemians
Byrne; Buchanan; Smith		Ellis

Shelbourne Park, Dublin

26 February, 1933

Dolphin	1–0	Shelbourne
McCarney

Dalymount Park, Dublin

== Final ==
17 March, 1933

Shamrock Rovers	3–3	Dolphin
Byrne; Buchanan; Matthews(pen)		Lennox(pen(2)); Fallon

Dalymount Park, Dublin
Attendance: 22,000

=== Replay ===
26 March, 1933

Shamrock Rovers	3–0	Dolphin
Daly (2); Byrne

Dalymount Park, Dublin
Attendance: 18,000

Winner of FAI Cup 1932–33
Shamrock Rovers
6th Title

== Notes ==
A. From 1923 to 1936, the FAI Cup was known as the Free State Cup.

B. Attendances were calculated using gate receipts which limited their accuracy as a large proportion of people, particularly children, attended football matches in Ireland throughout the 20th century for free by a number of means.

C. ^{a} Fixture abandoned after 38 minutes. Re-Fixture played on 11 January.
