= Mark Kelly (footballer, born 1969) =

English footballer (born 1969)

Personal information
- Date of birth: 27 November 1969 (age 56)
- Place of birth: Basingstoke, England
- Height: 1.75 m (5 ft 9 in)
- Position: Winger

Team information
- Current team: Portsmouth (academy manager)

Senior career*
Years	Team	Apps	(Gls)
1987–1993	Portsmouth	49	(2)
1996–1997	Sligo Rovers	?	(?)
1997–1998	Farnborough Town	1	(0)
2000–2001	Finn Harps	9	(0)

International career
1988–1989	Republic of Ireland	4	(0)
1989–1990	Republic of Ireland U23	2	(0)
1989–1990	Republic of Ireland U21	3	(0)
1987	Republic of Ireland U19	1	(1)

Managerial career
- 2014–: Portsmouth Academy
- * Club domestic league appearances and goals

Mark Kelly (born 27 November 1969) is a former professional footballer who played as a winger for Portsmouth. Born in England, he won four caps for the Republic of Ireland.

== Club career ==
Kelly was born in Basingstoke. Portsmouth manager Alan Ball described the 18-year-old Kelly as "the next George Best" but despite some exciting performances a series of injuries prevented him from becoming fully established in the first team. He made his debut for Portsmouth as a substitute away to West Ham United in February 1988.

He never recovered from a serious knee injury sustained in 1991 and was forced to retire a year later, after a brief trial at Tottenham Hotspur in a bid to resurrect his career. Later he played part-time for Sligo Rovers and Farnborough Town.

== International career ==
Although born in Basingstoke, Mark played for the Republic of Ireland through the parentage rule after being recommended to manager Jack Charlton. His first cap came on 27 April 1988, aged just 18, in a 2–0 friendly win over Yugoslavia at Lansdowne Road. He won his first cap a month before he made his full debut at club level.

== Coaching ==
Kelly worked as head of youth development at his former club, Portsmouth before leaving the club in October 2009. He eventually returned to Pompey on 18 June 2014, being appointed Academy manager.

== Media work ==
Kelly joined BBC Radio Solent at the start of the 2011–12 season as their match summariser for live commentaries on Portsmouth matches.

== See also ==
- List of Republic of Ireland international footballers born outside the Republic of Ireland
