= George Lennox (footballer) =

Irish footballer

Personal information
- Full name: George Lennox
- Date of birth: c. 1905
- Date of death: 7 March 1967 (aged 61–62)
- Place of death: Foxrock, Ireland
- Position: Defender

Senior career*
Years	Team	Apps	(Gls)
1930–1931	Dolphin		
1931–1932	Shelbourne		

International career
- League of Ireland XI
1931	Ireland	2	(0)
- * Club domestic league appearances and goals

George Lennox (c. 1905 – 7 March 1967) was an Irish professional footballer who played as a defender. He was active in Irish football during the early 20th century and represented both club and representative sides at national level.

== Career ==
At club level, Lennox played for Dolphin between 1930 and 1931 and later for Shelbourne from 1931 to 1932. During his time in the League of Ireland, he was selected to represent the League of Ireland XI.

In 1931, Lennox earned two caps for the Ireland national team. Although he did not score, his performances as a defender contributed to his recognition at international level.

Lennox died on 7 March 1967 in Foxrock, Ireland, at the age of 61–62.
