= Bob Griffiths (footballer, born 1907) =

Republic of Ireland footballer

Personal information
- Full name: Robert Griffiths
- Date of birth: 28 September 1907
- Position: Winger

Senior career*
Years	Team	Apps	(Gls)
1933-1934	Southport	57	(10)
1934–1935	Walsall	8	(1)

International career
1934	Ireland (FAI)	1	(0)
- * Club domestic league appearances and goals

Robert Griffiths (28 September 1907 – 19 January 1976) sometimes incorrectly referred to as Dick or Richard Griffiths, was an Irish professional footballer who played as a winger in the Football League for Southport F.C. and Walsall, in the League of Ireland for Drumcondra and Shelbourne and once for the Irish Free State national team.

== Club career ==
Griffiths made his debut for Walsall in a 3–2 defeat to York City in the Third Division North on 17 November 1934. In his second match two weeks later he scored as Walsall beat Accrington Stanley 6–0 at Fellows Park. He made only eight appearances in total for the club and scored one goal.

== International career ==
Griffiths made his debut for the Irish Free State in a 4–2 defeat to Hungary on 16 December 1934. This turned out to be his only appearance for his country.
