= Sean Byrne (Irish footballer) =

Irish footballer

Sean Byrne was an Irish footballer during the 1920s and 1930s.

Byrne was a tough defender during this era in the League of Ireland and had spells with Bohemians.

He won full international caps for Irish Free State making his debut against Spain in April 1931.
