= Tony Hunston =

Irish footballer

Anthony Hunston
Personal information
- Full name: Anthony Hunston
- Date of birth: August 12, 1902
- Place of birth: Dublin, Ireland
- Date of death: September 16, 1970 (aged 68)
- Place of death: Dublin, Ireland
- Height: 5 ft 9 in (1.75 m)
- Positions: Inside right; inside left

Senior career*
Years	Team	Apps	(Gls)
- Jacobs F.C.
c. 1924	Brooklyn F.C.		
- St James's Gate F.C.
c. 1924-1927	Chelsea F.C.		
- Shamrock Rovers F.C.

International career
1924	Irish Free State	1	(0)
- * Club domestic league appearances and goals

Anthony (Tony) Hunston was an Irish footballer who played for Brooklyn F.C. As an international he also played for the Irish Free State.

== Career ==
Hunston is listed as having started his football career with Jacobs F.C. before moving to Brooklyn where he is recorded as scoring one goal in the 1923–24 season. Hunston also represented Leinster at inter-provincial level. He made his international debut for the Irish Free State on 16 June 1924 in a friendly against the United States. This game would be the Irish Free State's first-ever international match on home turf. A crowd of just under 4,000 spectators at Dalymount Park in Dublin witnessed Ed Brooks score a hat-trick in a 3–1 win for the home side. This would be Hunston's only cap for Ireland at senior level; he was subsequently selected to play for Ireland against Italy at Lansdowne Road in April 1927 but was forced to withdraw after sustaining an injury days before the match.
