= Karl Gannon =

Irish footballer

Personal information
- Date of birth: 11 September 1974 (age 52)
- Place of birth: Dublin, Ireland
- Position: Striker

Youth career
- 19??–1991: St. Kevins Boys

Senior career*
Years	Team	Apps	(Gls)
1991–1994	Home Farm	69	(26)
1994–1996	Shamrock Rovers	58	(11)
1996–1997	Home Farm	38	(9)
1998–2000	Waterford United	67	(11)
Total		232	(57)
- * Club domestic league appearances and goals

Karl Gannon (born 11 September 1974) is an Irish former footballer.

== Career ==
He made his League of Ireland debut for Home Farm at Waterford United on 6 October 1991. He was the top scorer in the 1993–94 League of Ireland First Division with 16 goals.

He signed for Shamrock Rovers in 1995 where he stayed for two seasons making two appearances in European competition before signing for Waterford United.

His father, Mick Gannon, played for Shamrock Rovers in the 1970s.
