= Mick Gannon (Irish footballer) =

Irish footballer

Personal information
- Date of birth: 2 February 1947
- Place of birth: Dublin, Ireland
- Position: Right-back

Youth career
- 1964–1966: Bolton Athletics

Senior career*
Years	Team	Apps	(Gls)
1966–1977	Shelbourne	247	(1)
1977—1981	Shamrock Rovers	79	(3)
1981–1983	Shelbourne	49	(0)
1983–1984	Aer Lingus		

International career
1971	Republic of Ireland	1	(0)
- * Club domestic league appearances and goals

Mick Gannon (born 2 February 1947) was an Irish footballer in the 1970s who played for Shelbourne and for Shamrock Rovers.

== Career ==
Gannon was a diminutive but tenacious right-back who enjoyed a long and successful career in the League of Ireland. A skilful attacker, Gannon was on occasion used in midfield, though it was in the number two shirt that he made his international debut, in Liam Tuohy's first game as manager of the Irish national team against Austria in Linz in October 1971.

He signed for the Milltown club in November 1977 from Shels, where he had lost 2 FAI Cup Finals, and in his first season he won the FAI Cup. He went to make 4 appearances in European competition for the Hoops and was in the side that played in the first ever European tie at Milltown.

He returned to Shels in January 1981, where he ended his league career.

His uncle Eddie Gannon also played for his country and his son Karl Gannon played for Rovers in the 1990s.

== Sources ==
- Paul Doolan; Robert Goggins. The Hoops. ISBN 0-7171-2121-6.
