= Arthur Fitzsimons =

Irish footballer and manager

Personal information
- Date of birth: 16 December 1929
- Place of birth: Dublin, Ireland
- Date of death: 9 May 2018 (aged 88)
- Position: Inside forward

Senior career*
| Years | Team | Apps | (Gls) |
| 1946–1949 | Shelbourne | | |
| 1949–1959 | Middlesbrough | 223 | (49) |
| 1958–1959 | Lincoln City | 7 | (0) |
| 1959–1961 | Mansfield Town | 62 | (23) |
| 1961–1964 | Wisbech Town | | |
| 1967–1969 | Drogheda | 24 | (5) |

International career
| 1949–1959 | Republic of Ireland | 26 | (7) |

Managerial career
- 1967–1969: Drogheda
- 1967: League of Ireland XI
- 1969: Shamrock Rovers
- * Club domestic league appearances and goals

Arthur Fitzsimons (16 December 1929 – 9 May 2018) was an Irish professional football player and manager. An inside forward, he notably made over 200 appearances for Middlesbrough.

== Career ==
Originally from Penrose Street, in the shadow of Shelbourne Park, the stadium named after Shelbourne, their then home ground, Arthur signed with 'the Shels' from the famous schoolboy nursery club, Johnville.

Already well known for his talent at junior level, the scouts were anxious to see how he would perform at this higher level. So well did he perform with 'the Reds', that it is almost forgotten he played for them only one season, 1948–49, before being transferred over the water. But it was no coincidence that that season was one of the best in the club's history, being in contention until the last match in all four available competitions, finally winning two of them, and finishing runner-up in the others. At the end of the season, he was part of a two-player deal when transferred (with Peter Desmond) to Middlesbrough F.C. in the English First Division. He went on to play in 223 games, scoring 49 goals. His teammates included Brian Clough and Wilf Mannion.

In the 1960s, his coaching career took him to Libya, where he spent five and a half years in Tripoli until Colonel Gaddafi came to power, when he was advised to leave.

In August 1967, he signed for Drogheda as player-coach, a position he shared with Theo Dunne. In April 1969, his contract was terminated.

In June 1969, he was appointed manager of Shamrock Rovers, taking over from Liam Tuohy. Despite beating FC Schalke 04 in a 1969-70 European Cup Winners' Cup first leg tie, he was fired two months later.

He also played 26 times for the Republic of Ireland national team, scoring 7 goals.

== Later life and death ==
In 2009, Fitzsimons was inducted into the Football Association of Ireland Hall of Fame.

He died aged 88 on 9 May 2018.
