= Joey Donnelly =

Irish footballer

Personal information
- Full name: Joseph Donnelly
- Date of birth: 1 October 1909
- Place of birth: Dundalk
- Date of death: 29 February 1992 (aged 82)
- Place of death: Dundalk
- Position: Midfielder

Senior career*
| Years | Team | Apps | (Gls) |
| 1929–1947 | Dundalk | 519 | (142) |
| | Belfast Celtic | 78 | (25) |

International career
| 1934–1937 | Republic of Ireland | 10 | (4) |
- * Club domestic league appearances and goals

Joseph Donnelly (1 October 1909 – 29 February 1992) was a Republic of Ireland international footballer.

Donnelly was a creative midfielder and was capped ten times for the Republic of Ireland at senior level, scoring four goals. He scored on his international debut in a 4–2 home defeat to Hungary in December 1934. He participated in the historic Irish 5-2 win against Hitler's Germany in 1936, scoring a goal. He is considered one of the greatest Irish football players of all time, having a place in the Irish Hall of Fame since 1992 after his death.

In his 'Book of Irish Goalscorers' Sean Ryan described Joey's international career as follows;

"Two games stand out, both at Dalymount Park. In March 1936 he celebrated St Patrick's Day with a win over Switzerland and played a crucial role in that success. The Irish Independent reported: 'Donnelly acted as a link between the halves and the forwards. Playing well behind his front-line colleague, he secured many Swiss clearances and in this way kept up or developed numerous home attacks'. Seven months later he played one of his greatest games when, with Paddy Moore, he took the German defence apart to inspire Ireland to a tremendous 5-2 win".

His last representative appearance came in 1938 when he was on the League of Ireland team defeated 3-1 the Irish League, when his performance drew the following rapturous assessment from the Irish News; 'His ball control and his happy knack of filling the inside left, left-half and sometimes the inside-right berth, reminded me of Bryn Jones, Wolves International. I haven't seen a better inside-forward display in years'.

Donnelly's was inducted into the Irish Hall of Fame in 1992.
