= Alf Ringstead =

Irish footballer (1927–2000)

Personal information
- Full name: Alfred Ringstead
- Date of birth: 14 October 1927
- Place of birth: Dublin, Ireland
- Date of death: 15 January 2000 (aged 72)
- Place of death: Sheffield, England
- Position: Outside right

Youth career
- Ellesmere Port F.C.

Senior career*
Years	Team	Apps	(Gls)
1950–1959	Sheffield United	247	(101)
1959–1960	Mansfield Town	27	(3)
1960-1961	Frickley Colliery		
- Buxton
1964	Macclesfield Town	8	(4)
Total		282	(108)

International career
1951–1959	Republic of Ireland	20	(7)
- * Club domestic league appearances and goals

Alfred Ringstead (14 October 1927 – 15 January 2000) was a professional footballer who played in the position of outside right for Sheffield United between 1950 and 1959.

He was the son of jockey Charlie Ringstead. As a 14-year-old, Ringstead played his football for Everton junior teams where he received a wage of just three shillings and sixpence. The Merseyside club showed little interest in keeping him and he returned home without any encouragement. After serving in the Army in India, Alf returned to play for Ellesmere Port Town while working as an upholsterer.

In 1950, Alf joined non-league Northwich Victoria in the Cheshire League, and after little more than a handful of games, he had scored eleven goals, and it was while he was with them that he was spotted by Sheffield United. He was watched by United in a match at Buxton and, agreed to sign a few hours after the match had finished.

He was signed by Sheffield United manager Teddy Davison in November 1950, in a double transfer along with fellow winger Derek Hawksworth, for a total outlay of £15,000, with Hawksworth joining two weeks later.

After two appearances in the Central League side, Ringstead made his first team league debut against Coventry City at Bramall Lane on 2 December 1950, scoring with a flying header and, scored in the following two games in Division Two. He was fast, penetrative, determined, eager to take on an opponent, and shared these characteristics with the ability to shoot and centre with power and accuracy with both feet.

He was effective at heading the ball, but it was his sense of anticipation for being in the right place at the right time, that contributed to his goal-scoring record.

He made his debut for the Republic of Ireland against Argentina at Dalymount Park, Dublin, on 13 May 1951, and had such a good game that he won a regular place in the side, building up to a total of 20 international caps.

Ringstead played a significant part in Sheffield United's 7–3 defeat of Sheffield Wednesday in the Steel City derby at Bramall Lane on 8 September 1951, scoring two of the goals in the famous victory. In total, he played 247 league matches for the Blades and scoring 101 goals, in his eight years at Bramall Lane.

Soon after scoring his 101st League goal for Sheffield United, Alf was transferred to Mansfield Town in July 1959. He played 27 matches scoring three goals for the Stags.

He then played for non-league Frickley Colliery, Buxton finishing career at Macclesfield Town.

== Bibliography ==
- Clarebrough, Denis (1989). Sheffield United F.C., The First 100 years. Sheffield United Football Club. ISBN 0-9508588-1-1.
- Young, Percy A. (1962). Football in Sheffield. Stanley Paul & Co Ltd. ISBN 0-9506272-4-0.
- A to Z Encyclopedia, Sheffield United Match Day Programme, 22 March 1986.
- They Played at the Lane, Sheffield United Match Day Programme, 17 September 1988.
