= Fred Horlacher =

Irish footballer

Personal information
- Date of birth: March 1910
- Place of birth: Blackrock, Dublin, Ireland
- Date of death: 17 March 1943 (aged 32–33)
- Positions: Inside left; left half

Senior career*
Years	Team	Apps	(Gls)
1928–1943	Bohemians	193	(85)

International career
	League of Ireland XI	2	
1930–1936	Irish Free State (FAI)	7	(2)
1930	Ireland Amateurs (IFA)	1	
- * Club domestic league appearances and goals

Fred Horlacher (March 1910 – 17 March 1943) was an Irish footballer who played for Bohemians in the League of Ireland during the 1920s, 1930s and 1940s. As an international, Horlacher represented both Ireland teams. He played as a senior for the FAI XI and as an amateur for the IFA XI. Horlacher died from pneumonia at the age of 33.

== Bohemians ==
Horlacher was born in Blackrock, Dublin to German immigrants. He made his debut for Bohemians against Fordsons in September 1928. During over a decade at Bohs, he made over 430 appearances, 193 in the league. He also scored 159 goals, including 85 in the league. His best season came in 1935–36 when he netted 28 times in all competitions, including 13 in the league, helping Bohs win the league title for the third time. Fred played his last game for Bohemians on 6 February 1943 in a FAI Cup tie against Shamrock Rovers.

He is joint third with Turlough O'Connor in Bohemians' all-time FAI Cup goalscoring list with 14 strikes in that competition.

== Irish international ==
When Horlacher played international football between 1930 and 1936, there were in effect, two Ireland teams, chosen by two rival associations. Both associations, the Northern Ireland – based IFA and the Irish Free State – based FAI claimed jurisdiction over the whole of Ireland and selected players from the whole island. As a result, several notable Irish players from this era, including Horlacher played for both teams.

=== FAI XI ===
Between 1930 and 1936 Horlacher made seven senior appearances and scored 2 goals for the FAI XI. He made his debut for the FAI XI on 11 May 1930 in a 3–1 away win against Belgium. His teammates on the day included, among others, Tom Farquharson, Mick O'Brien, Harry Duggan, Jimmy Dunne, fellow Bohs player Jack McCarthy and his future coach at Bohs, Bill Lacey. On 8 April 1934, Horlacher became the FAI XI's first ever substitute when in a World Cup qualifier against the Netherlands he replaced another Bohs player Billy Jordan. The game ended in a 5–2 defeat. On 8 December 1935, in a friendly against Netherlands at Dalymount Park, together with Bill McGuire, Paddy Andrews and Plev Ellis he was one of four Bohemian players in the FAI XI. Ellis scored the FAI XI's opener before Horlacher then scored both of his international goals, giving them a 3–2 half-time lead. Despite this the FAI XI still lost 5–3. Horlacher and Ellis both retained their places for a 1–0 friendly win against Switzerland on 17 March 1936. Their combined efforts set up Jimmy Dunne for the winner. This proved to be Horlacher's last cap.

=== IFA XI ===
In 1930, together with fellow Bohs, Jimmy Bermingham and Alec Morton, Horlacher also played for an IFA Amateur XI in a 3–1 win against England Amateurs. The trio played against the wishes of the FAI and were subsequently suspended by the FAI for three months.

== Other interests ==
Horlacher was also a noted Water Polo player and was a member of the successful Sandycove Water Polo team. A prolific sportsman he also was an accomplished tennis player at the Monkstown Lawn Tennis Club and was also a talented amateur golfer.

== Honours ==
=== Bohemians ===
- League of Ireland: 1929–30, 1933–34, 1935–36
- FAI Cup: 1935
- League of Ireland Shield: 1929, 1934
- Dublin City Cup: 1936
