= Plev Ellis =

Irish footballer

Personal information
- Full name: Plevna Turner Ellis
- Date of birth: 1909
- Place of birth: Dublin, Ireland
- Date of death: 23 September 1973
- Position: Winger

Senior career*
| Years | Team | Apps | (Gls) |
| 1927-1939 | Bohemians | | |

International career
| 1935-1937 | Ireland (FAI) | 7 | (2) |
- * Club domestic league appearances and goals

Plevna Ellis was an Irish association footballer who played as a forward during the 1930s. His name, Plevna, is a reference to the 1877 Siege of Plevna, which was located in modern-day Bulgaria, an uncle of his had fought with the British Army there during the siege.

== Career ==
Born in 1909, Plev Ellis was a part of the Bohemians amateur team of the 1930s. He won seven full international caps for Ireland, making his debut against Switzerland in May 1935 alongside fellow Bohemian Paddy O'Kane.

== Honours ==
Bohemians

- FAI Cup: 1935
