= John Fagan =

Irish footballer

Personal information
- Date of birth: 1900
- Place of birth: Dublin, Ireland
- Date of death: 8 August 1966 (aged 65–66)
- Position: Outside left

Senior career*
Years	Team	Apps	(Gls)
1922–1929	Shamrock Rovers		(31)
1929–19??	Kingswood		

International career
1924–1927	League of Ireland XI	5	(0)
1924	FAI XI	1	(0)
1926	Ireland	1	(0)
- * Club domestic league appearances and goals

John "Kruger" Fagan also known as Jackie Fagan (1900 - 8 August 1966), was an Irish football player and prominent member of the Shamrock Rovers team during the 1920s. He also played for the League of Ireland XI and Ireland. His son Paddy Fagan played for the Republic of Ireland in the 1950s and 1960s. They were the first father and son to play for an Ireland team selected by the FAI.

== Shamrock Rovers ==
Fagan came from the Markets area of Dublin and was just under 5'2" in height. Sean Ryan refers to him as veteran of the Irish War of Independence. In 1922–23 he helped Shamrock Rovers win their first League of Ireland title. During the 1924–25 season, together with Bob Fullam, John Joe Flood and Billy Farrell, he formed part of a legendary forward-line known as the Four F's. He had a particular good partnership with Fullam. The season also saw Rovers win a League of Ireland, League of Ireland Shield and FAI Cup treble. They won the 1924–25 FAI Cup after beating Shelbourne 2-1 at Dalymount Park before an attendance of 25,000. Rovers went through the 1924–25 season undefeated and thus became the first side in the brief history of the League to win the title twice. Fagan also played and scored for Rovers in the 1925–26 FAI Cup final defeat to Fordsons. He helped Rovers win a third League of Ireland title in 1926–27. During the summer of 1929 he suffered a serious illness which effectively ended his Rovers career. He left the club in December but shortly afterwards featured as a left half for Kingswood in the Leinster Senior League Second Division.

== International career ==
=== League of Ireland XI ===
Between 1924 and 1927 Fagan also made five appearances for the League of Ireland XI. On 9 February 1924, he played in the selection first official game when they made their debut in a 3–3 draw against the Welsh Football League XI at Dalymount Park. Among his teammates were Frank Collins, Ernie MacKay, Bertie Kerr, Dave Roberts, Johnny McIlroy and Christy Robinson. Fagan provided two assists, with MacKay and Roberts both scoring from crosses he provided. On 13 March 1926 he also featured when the League of Ireland XI played the Irish League XI for the first time. His teammates this time included Collins, Frank Brady, Val Harris, Charlie Dowdall and the other three Four F's. The League of Ireland XI won this game 3-1.

=== FAI XI ===
On 23 February 1924 Fagan also played for an FAI XI in a prestige friendly against Celtic. 18,000 turned up at Dalymount Park to see Celtic win 3-0. The game was used by the FAI to raise funds to help send a squad to the 1924 Olympic Games. His teammates for this game included Jack McCarthy, Val Harris, Ernie MacKay and Charlie Dowdall.

=== Ireland ===
Fagan made his only appearance for Ireland in a 3-0 away defeat against Italy on 21 March 1926. His teammates on this occasion included Harry Cannon, Frank Brady, Jack McCarthy, Dinny Doyle, John Joe Flood and Bob Fullam.
