= Ernie Crawford =

Ireland international rugby union player (1891–1959)

- Born: William Ernest Crawford; 17 November 1891 Belfast, Ireland
- Died: 12 January 1959 (aged 67)

Rugby union career
- Position: Full back
Senior career
Years	Team	Apps	(Points)
–	Malone		
–	Cliftonville		
–	Cardiff		
–	Lansdowne		
–	Bohemians		
1926–1928	Athlone Town		
International career
Years	Team	Apps	(Points)
1920–1927	Ireland	30	(18)
–	Barbarians		

William Ernest Crawford (17 November 1891 – 12 January 1959) was an Ireland rugby union international during the 1920s. He was also a noted soccer player and was included in the Ireland squad for the 1924 Olympic Football Tournament.

== Club career ==
While living in Belfast, Crawford played rugby union for Malone and soccer for Cliftonville. After moving to Dublin, he maintained his interest in both codes. He was club captain at Lansdowne for the 1921–22 and 1922–23 seasons, taking over from Noel Purcell. At the same time he also played soccer for Bohemians. Due to his rugby union commitments and the presence of fellow full backs, Jack McCarthy and Bertie Kerr, Crawford was never a first choice in the Bohemians senior team, but he did play regularly for their second team in the Leinster Senior League. During the 1926–27 and 1927–28 seasons Crawford would also assist Athlone Town on a number of occasions, especially when they visited Dublin.

== International career ==
=== Rugby union ===
Between 1920 and 1927, Crawford made 30 appearances for Ireland. He made his debut on 14 February 1920 against England at Lansdowne Road. The majority of his appearances were in the Five Nations Championship but in 1924 he also played against a touring New Zealand. During his international rugby career he scored six conversions and two penalties. He also captained Ireland on fifteen occasions between 1924 and 1927. One of the highlights of his career came on 13 February 1926 when he captained Ireland to a 19–15 win over England – their first win over England for fifteen years. He played his final game for Ireland against Wales on 12 March 1927. His Ireland teammates included William Roche and Noel Purcell.

=== Soccer ===
In 1924, after playing in a trial game, Crawford was one of six Bohemians players selected in a squad to represent Ireland at the 1924 Olympic Football Tournament. The other five were Jack McCarthy, Bertie Kerr, Johnny Murray, Christy Robinson and John Thomas. However, when the final squad was reduced to sixteen, Crawford found himself dropped. He accompanied the team to the tournament as a spectator but did not participate as a player. He later also played for UCD.

== Later years ==
Crawford later served as a selector for the Ireland team that won the Grand Slam in 1948, and was president of the Irish Rugby Football Union for the 1957–58 season. He also served as president of Skerries Rugby Club. In 1932 he stood as an Independent candidate in the Irish general election and received 3,194 first preference votes but failed to be elected in the Dublin County constituency.
