= Dave Roberts (English footballer) =

English footballer

Personal information
- Place of birth: Tipton, England
- Position: Forward

Senior career*
Years	Team	Apps	(Gls)
1920–1922	Shrewsbury Town		
1922–192?	Walsall	3	(0)
1923–1925	Bohemians		(33)
1925–19??	Fordsons		(20)

International career
1924–1925	League of Ireland XI	2	(2)
- * Club domestic league appearances and goals

David A. Roberts was an English footballer who played as a forward in the Football League for Walsall and in the League of Ireland for Bohemians and Fordsons during the 1920s.

== Playing career ==
=== English career ===
Roberts was born in Tipton, Staffordshire. He spent two seasons with Birmingham & District League club Shrewsbury Town. Described as a "thrustful" player, he was Shrewsbury's top scorer before joining Walsall of the Third Division North at the end of the 1921–22 season. He scored freely for the reserve team, but when he got a chance in the first team, he had little success. He made his Football League debut on 16 September 1922, playing at inside right away to Chesterfield. According to the Sheffield Daily Telegraph, "both in attack and defence the middle line was streets below Third Division standard, and although Archer and Roberts (the old Shrewsbury Town player) tried hard to get the attack going, they received very little support", as Walsall lost 6–0. Roberts played twice more in Third Division matches before moving to Ireland.

=== Bohemians ===
Roberts joined Bohemians during the 1922–23 campaign, and finished as the League of Ireland's top scorer in 1923–24 season. His 20 goals in 17 appearances helped Bohs win their first ever League title, which included a run of 15 successive league wins. Other members of the team included Bertie Kerr, Johnny McIlroy, Billy Otto, Christy Robinson, Jack McCarthy and Johnny Murray. In all competitions during the 1923–24 season, Roberts scored 25 goals in 27 games.

In 1925, Roberts was sentenced to a month's imprisonment for desertion of his family, failing to pay a maintenance order and leaving his two children chargeable to the poor law guardians.

=== Fordsons ===
Roberts played for Fordsons during the 1925–26 and 1926–27 seasons, scoring 20 goals in League competition, and helped them win the 1925–26 Free State Cup. In the final Roberts scored the opening goal, a header from a free kick, as Fordsons beat Shamrock Rovers 3–2.

=== League of Ireland XI ===
Roberts played three times for the League of Ireland XI. While a Bohemians player, he scored twice in a 3–3 draw with a Welsh League XI on 9 February 1924 at Dalymount Park. In March 1925 he also played in a 2–1 defeat against the same opponents. His teammates while playing in these games included fellow Bohs players Bertie Kerr, Johnny McIlroy, Christy Robinson and Johnny Murray as well as Frank Collins and John Joe Flood.

== Honours ==
Bohemians

- League of Ireland: 1923–24

Fordsons

- Free State Cup: 1925–26

Individual

- League of Ireland Top Scorer: 1923–24 (20 goals)
