= Billy Farrell (footballer) =

Irish footballer

Personal information
- Place of birth: Ireland
- Position: Centre forward

Senior career*
Years	Team	Apps	(Gls)
192x–1926	Shamrock Rovers		(58)

International career
1925–1926	League of Ireland XI	3	(1)
- * Club domestic league appearances and goals

Billy Farrell was an Irish association footballer who played for Shamrock Rovers and the League of Ireland XI during the 1920s. Farrell was a prominent member of the Rovers team that won the treble in 1924–25 and was top goalscorer in the League of Ireland on two successive seasons. He remains one of Rovers all-time leading goalscorers. Farrell was a highly regarded player, keeping a young Jimmy Dunne out of the Rovers first team. During the summer of 1926 Farrell suffered a broken thigh following a motor cycle accident and this subsequently ended his career.

== Playing career ==
=== Shamrock Rovers ===
Together with Bob Fullam, John Fagan and John Joe Flood, Farrell was part of a legendary Shamrock Rovers forward-line known as the "Four F's". Farrell and Fullam formed a particularly strong partnership. In the 1924–25 League of Ireland season they scored 25 and 20 goals respectively. Farrell finished the season as top goalscorer and Rovers went on to win a treble, by also winning the League of Ireland Shield and the FAI Cup. In 1925–26, Farrell was again the league topscorer this time scoring 24 goals. He also scored in the 1925–26 FAI Cup final against Fordsons but Rovers lost 3–2.

=== League of Ireland XI ===
Between 1925 and 1926 Farrell made three appearances for the League of Ireland XI. On 14 March 1925 Farrell played in a 2–1 home defeat against the Welsh Football League XI. His teammates on this occasion included Ernie MacKay, John Joe Flood, Dave Roberts and Johnny Murray. On 7 November 1925 he played again against the Welsh Football League XI in a 2–2 away draw. On 13 March 1926 he scored in 3–1 win against the Irish League XI at Dalymount Park. On both of the latter occasions all of the "Four F's" also featured. Bob Fullam and Flood scored in the away game against the Welsh selection. Fulham also scored against the Irish League XI.

=== Ireland trialist ===
In March 1926 Ireland were preparing to play Italy in a friendly. Farrell took part in trials for the team and also played for a Leinster XI against a Munster XI in an unofficial trial. He had played poorly in this interprovincial match and failed to impress the national team selectors. The day before he had scored a hat-trick while playing for Shamrock Rovers in a League of Ireland Shield game against Brideville but had picked up a hip injury in the process. Despite his prolific goalscoring record and experience playing for the League of Ireland XI, Farrell was left out of the squad for the Italy game and was overlooked in favour of Ned Brooks and Fran Watters.

== Honours ==
Shamrock Rovers

- League of Ireland
  - 1924–25
- FAI Cup
  - Winners: 1924–25
  - Runners-up: 1925–26
- League of Ireland Shield
  - 1924–25

Individual

- League of Ireland Top Scorer:
  - 1924–25, 1925–26
