= Bertie Kerr =

Irish footballer (1896–1973)

Personal information
- Full name: Herbert William Joseph Kerr
- Date of birth: 19 October 1896
- Place of birth: County Dublin, Ireland
- Date of death: 23 November 1973 (aged 77)
- Position: Full-back

Senior career*
Years	Team	Apps	(Gls)
1914–1927	Bohemians		

International career
1924	League of Ireland XI	1	(0)
1924	Irish Free State	3	(0)
- * Club domestic league appearances and goals

Herbert William Joseph Kerr (19 October 1896 – 23 November 1973) was an Irish association football player during the 1910s and 1920s. Kerr played for Bohemians, the League of Ireland XI and Ireland. In 1924, he was a member of the first Ireland team selected by the FAI and at the same time he represented Ireland at the 1924 Olympics. He was also the first player to captain an FAI Ireland team in a home international. After retiring as a footballer, Kerr established himself a worldwide reputation as a leading bloodstock agent. Among the many racehorses he bought and sold were Nasrullah and Tomy Lee, who won the 1959 Kentucky Derby. Kerr also traded horses that won the Aintree Grand National, the Grand Prix de Paris, the French Derby, the Irish 2,000 Guineas, and the Irish St. Leger. His younger brother Kevin also played for Bohemians and was a successful horse trainer. His niece, Virginia Kerr, is one of Ireland's leading opera singers.

== Early years ==
Kerr was born in County Dublin. He was the eldest son and second child of Joseph Kerr, who worked as a clerk with the Inland Revenue, and his wife, Mary, who originally came from County Laois. Kerr was educated at the O'Connell School in Dublin and by 1911, then aged 17, he was living at 3 St. Alphonsus Road in Drumcondra. On leaving school, Kerr joined his father at the Inland Revenue and worked as a clerk. He later worked in an insurance brokerage.

== Football career ==
=== Bohemians ===
Kerr first started playing for Bohemians in 1914, and he continued to play for the club until 1927. Throughout his career with the club, he regularly captained the team and for the 1918–19 season he was appointed club captain. While playing for Bohemians, he helped them win their first-ever League title in 1923–24. Bohs won the title after winning 15 successive league games. Other members of the team included Dave Roberts, Johnny McIlroy, Billy Otto, Christy Robinson, Jack McCarthy, and Johnny Murray. Kerr was also a member of the Bohs team that won the 1924 League of Ireland Shield. On 17 February 1924, while playing for Bohemians in the 1923–24 FAI Cup semi-final against Athlone Town at Shelbourne Park, he suffered a serious injury. In a clash with Town's Jim Sweeney, he broke his jaw and lost some teeth. Kerr remained involved with Bohemians, throughout the remainder of his life serving as both a committee member and as a club vice president. Kevin Kerr captained the club in 1942, twenty-three years after his older brother had the honour. After the Hoopers and the O'Kanes, they became the third set of brothers to captain Bohs.

=== League of Ireland XI ===
On 9 February 1924, Kerr was one of five Bohemians players to play for the first official League of Ireland XI when they made their debut in the 3–3 draw against the Welsh Football League XI at Dalymount Park. The other four were Dave Roberts, Johnny McIlroy, Christy Robinson, and Harry Willets. Among the other members of the team were Frank Collins, Ernie MacKay, and John Fagan.

=== Ireland ===
In 1924, Kerr also made three international appearances for Ireland. He was a member of the first senior Ireland team selected by the FAI. The team competed at the 1924 Olympics and on 28 May, Kerr made his international debut against Bulgaria. Other members of the Ireland team included his Bohemians teammates, Jack McCarthy and Johnny Murray, as well Dinny Hannon, Ernie MacKay, Joe Kendrick, Tommy Muldoon, and Paddy Duncan. Kerr and his fellow footballers also became the first athletes to represent Ireland at the Summer Olympics under the auspices of the Irish Olympic Council. Ireland defeated Bulgaria 1–0 and thus progressed to the quarter-finals. On 2 June, Kerr made his second appearance against the Netherlands. Ireland lost this game 2–1 after extra time. On 14 June, Kerr made his third and final Ireland appearance in a friendly against the United States at Dalymount Park. He also served as Ireland captain for this game, thus making him the first player to captain an FAI Ireland team in a home international. Kerr led the team to a 3–1 win.

== Bloodstock agent ==
In September 1920, with support from his father, Kerr founded his own insurance and bloodstock agency. He had developed a knack for spotting the potential in young race horses and largely on the back of this reputation his agency, Kerr & Co. Ltd, developed into a successful family business. One of his biggest successes as a bloodstock agent came with the purchase of Nasrullah in 1944. This horse was acquired by Kerr & Co. Ltd from the renowned horse owner the Aga Khan III. The company owned him for three weeks before selling him on to Joseph McGrath. This deal was allegedly done over an afternoon cup of tea at Bewley's in Westmoreland Street.

Kerr also purchased and sold on four horses that later won the Aintree Grand National. They included Sheila's Cottage in 1948, Freebooter in 1950, Anglo in 1966, and Red Alligator in 1969. Probably one of his greatest purchases was Tomy Lee, the winner of the 1959 Kentucky Derby. Tomy Lee became only the second non-American bred horse to ever win the Kentucky Derby, and Kerr became the first non-American agent to buy a winner. In 1956, Kerr attended the Newmarket sales, acting on the behalf of Fred Turner, a millionaire oilman and rancher from Texas. Turner had instructed Kerr to buy two horses that he had picked out of the catalogue. He was chiefly interested in a colt that came to be named Tuleg, but he also wanted a second horse in order to provide Tuleg with a travelling companion. This second horse was Tomy Lee. Shortly after Tomy Lee won the 1959 Kentucky Derby, Kerr relayed to Michael O'Hehir the story behind the purchase. O'Hehir then retold the story in the Daily Racing Form. After viewing Turner's first choice for Tuleg's travelling companion, Kerr was less than impressed and cabled him, advising him not to buy this particular foal. Instead, Kerr recommended another colt he had seen at the sale. Turner gave Kerr the go ahead "to bid up to $15,000," and Kerr got Tomy Lee for $6,762. Tuleg was purchased for $25,000 and proved to be a dud, but Kerr's recommendation was a bargain.

Kerr's reputation was not confined to Ireland or Kentucky. It extended to Hollywood, and among the many people he could count on as a friend, an acquaintance, and a client was Raoul Walsh. Together with his friend John Huston, Walsh was a keen horse racing fan. In 1951, on hearing that Huston, was travelling to England and suspecting that he might be interested in buying a horse, Walsh wrote to Huston and declared that "the finest and most honest man I can recommend is Bert Kerr." Nearly eight years later, when Tomy Lee won the Kentucky Derby, Walsh provided Kerr with his own personal commentary. Always keen to follow the progress of his purchases, even after they had been moved on, Kerr had tuned into the American Forces Network for a commentary on the race. However, before it got underway, he received a phone call from Walsh, who was six thousand miles away in Hollywood watching the race on American television.

As well as buying and selling horses for others, Kerr & Co. Ltd ran a successful racing stable which was managed by Bert's younger brother Kevin. The Bohemians influence on the Kerr's remained strong, and they adopted the club's red and black colours as their racing colours. In addition, among the many horses that passed through their stables was one in 1959 called Bohemian Boy. Kevin trained Sea Charger to victory in the 1953 Irish 2,000 Guineas and Irish St. Leger. More success came in 1965 when he won the Irish 2,000 Guineas for a second time with Green Banner. The buying and selling side of the business remained successful, and one of Kerr's most enthusiastic later clients was Stephen Sokolow, a Brazilian-born horse race owner who was prominent in French racing circles. Sokolow bought several yearlings from Kerr that excelled on the track. Among the more successful were Roll of Honour, who won the 1970 Grand Prix de Paris, and Hard to Beat, who won the 1972 French Derby. Both of these horses were ridden by Lester Piggott.

Kerr & Co. Ltd still survives, and it claims to be the "oldest established still trading bloodstock agency in the world". Today the company is managed by Bert Kerr, Jr., a nephew of the original Bert Kerr.

== Honours ==
Bohemians

- League of Ireland: 1923–24
- League of Ireland Shield: 1924
