= Peter Kavanagh (footballer) =

Irish footballer

- Peter Kavanagh

Personal information
- Full name: Peter Joseph Kavanagh
- Date of birth: 5th June 1908
- Place of birth: Dublin, Ireland
- Date of death: 15 February 1993 (aged 82–83)
- Place of death: Glasgow, Scotland
- Height: 5 ft 4 in (1.63 m)
- Position: Outside left

Youth career
- Munster Boys (Drumcondra)
- Melrose Celtic of Fairview
- 192x–1927: Drumcondra

Senior career*
Years	Team	Apps	(Gls)
1927–1929	Bohemians	46	(11)
1929–1932	Celtic	32	(5)
1932–1933	Northampton Town	1	(0)
1933	Guildford City		
1934	Hibernian	9	(3)
1935–1936	Stranraer		
1936–19xx	Waterford United		
- Babcock & Wilcox

International career
1928–1929	League of Ireland XI	2	(2)
1929	Ireland (IFA)	1	(0)
1931	Irish Free State (FAI)	2	(0)
- * Club domestic league appearances and goals

Peter Kavanagh (05 June 1908 – 15 February 1993) was an Irish footballer who played for, among others, Bohemians and Celtic. Kavanagh was a dual internationalist and played for both Ireland teams – the IFA XI and the FAI XI. After leaving Celtic, Kavanagh had spells with several clubs before finishing his career with a works team prior to the Second World War. He eventually settled in Glasgow where he died on 15 February 1993.

== Club career ==
=== Bohemians ===
Kavanagh played junior football in the Drumcondra area of Dublin before signing for Bohemians in 1927. Bohs manager, an ex-Rangers player, Bobby Parker, put the teenage Kavanagh straight into the first team. Together with Jack McCarthy, Harry Cannon, Jimmy White, Jimmy Bermingham, Jeremiah Robinson and Christy Robinson, he was a prominent member of the successful amateur Bohs team during the late 1920s. During the 1927–28 season they won a quartet of trophies including the League of Ireland title, the FAI Cup, the League of Ireland Shield and Leinster Senior Cup. In April 1928 he also played in a prestige friendly for Bohs against Celtic. While at Bohs, Kavanagh also played twice for the League of Ireland XI. In October 1928 he scored twice as they defeated a Welsh League XI, 4–3 at Dalymount Park. Then in October 1929 he played against an Irish League XI, losing 2–1.

=== Celtic ===
In April 1929 Kavanagh signed for Celtic and made his Scottish League debut in 2–1 win over Hearts on 10 August 1929. He then scored his first goal for the club two weeks later against Aberdeen. Despite an initial bright start at Celtic, following a serious knee injury Kavanagh subsequently lost his first team place and was released by the club in May 1932.

== International career ==
When Kavanagh played international football between 1929 and 1930, there were in effect, two Ireland teams, chosen by two rival associations. Both associations, the Northern Ireland – based IFA and the Irish Free State – based FAI claimed jurisdiction over the whole of Ireland and selected players from the whole island. As a result, several notable Irish players from this era, including Kavanagh played for both teams.

=== IFA XI ===
On 19 October 1929 at Windsor Park, Kavanagh made his one and only appearance for the IFA XI in a 3–0 defeat to England. His teammates on the day included Elisha Scott and Joe Bambrick. In 1931 he turned down the offer of a second cap from IFA to play for the FAI XI against Spain.

=== FAI XI ===
In 1931 Kavanagh he also played twice for the FAI XI against Spain. On 26 April 1931 he helped an FAI XI that also included Tom Farquharson, Paddy Moore, Jeremiah Robinson, Harry Chatton and Charlie Dowdall gain a respectable 1–1 draw at the Montjuic Stadium in Barcelona. In the dying seconds of the game, Kavanagh almost won the game for the FAI XI. Just after Farquharson had saved a penalty, he kicked the ball out to Kavanagh, who then made a break down the wing. However, as the Spanish goalkeeper, Ricardo Zamora advanced, his shot hit the post and went wide. He made his second and last appearance for the FAI XI in the return game against Spain on 13 December 1931 at Dalymount Park. This time however, Spain easily won 5–0.
