= Matches of the Republic of Ireland national football team =

Irish association football international matches since 1924

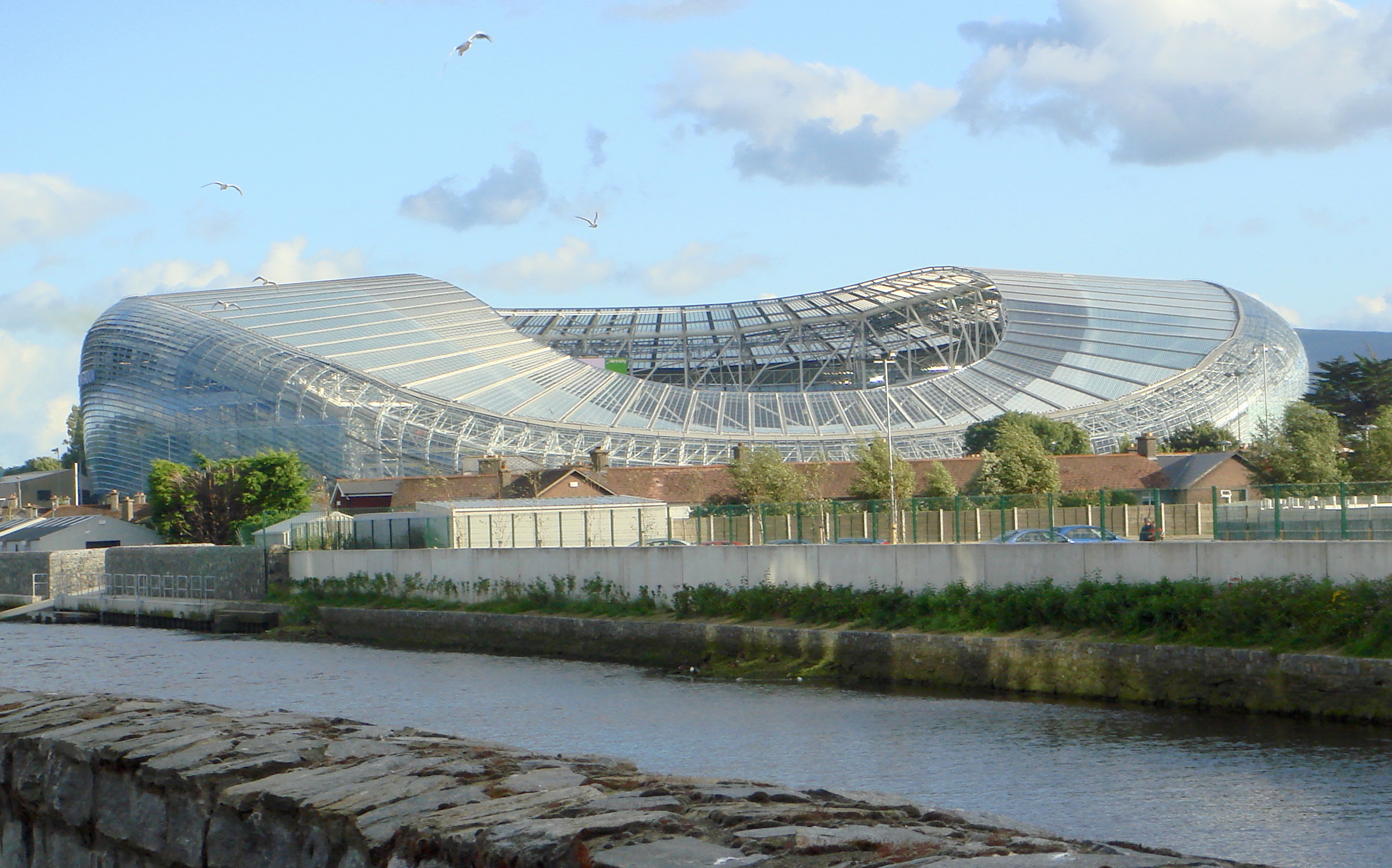
Home ground of the Irish football team at Lansdowne Road in Dublin

This is a sortable list of all association football matches played by the Republic of Ireland national football team since 1924.

Following the Irish War of Independence from the United Kingdom, the Football Association of Ireland (FAI) was founded in September 1921. Ireland joined world football governing body FIFA in August 1923 as the Football Association of the Irish Free State (FAIFS). Ireland's first post-Independence internationals were played at the 1924 Summer Olympics in Paris. The team played as Irish Free State between 1924 and 1935. The name Football Association of Ireland was re-adopted in 1936, and from then until 1954, they played as Ireland; since 1954 they have been Republic of Ireland following the renaming of the team by FIFA, to distinguish them from Northern Ireland.

Ireland competed every four years in the qualification phases of the World Cups and, from 1960, in the qualification phases of the European Nations' Cup, later known as the European Football Championships.

It was not until 1988 that the team succeeded in qualifying for the finals of a major tournament when they went to West Germany to play in the 1988 European Championships. Two years later, Ireland competed for the first time in a World Cup Finals, at Italia '90.

With the exception of Bill Lacey, who was team manager on four occasions during the 1930s, the team was managed and chosen by a committee of selectors of the FAIFS or FAI for more than four decades, until 1969. The team has been managed since then by individuals rather than committees.

== List of matches ==
- Score format: Irish scores appear first, to the left, irrespective of whether the game was played at home or away.
- Colour codes: Win Draw Loss Forthcoming match Not counted in official team statistics

Go to: 1930s | 1940s | 1950s | 1960s | 1970s | 1980s | 1990s | 2000s | 2010s | 2020s | 2026

Date	Match	Venue (city, stadium)	Opponent	Score	Manager	Notes
1924-05-28	1924 Summer Olympics	Paris, Stade Olympique	Bulgaria	1–0	OCI	Manager: Olympic Council of Ireland. Paddy Duncan scored first goal for Irish Free State. Crowd: 1,659.
1924-06-02	1924 Summer Olympics, quarter final	Paris, Stade de Paris	Netherlands	1–2	OCI	Crowd: 1,506.
1924-06-03	Friendly	Paris, Stade Olympique	Estonia	3–1	FAIFS	Manager: Football Association of the Irish Free State (FAIFS).
1924-06-14	Friendly	Dublin, Dalymount Park	United States	3–1	FAIFS	Ed Brookes hat-trick.
1926-03-21	Friendly	Turin, Motovelodromo	Italy	0–3	FAIFS	Professional players introduced. Crowd: 12,000.
1926-03-03	Friendly	Dublin, Dalymount Park	IFA League	3–1	FAIFS	Unofficial match. FAIFS (Free State) v IFA (Northern Ireland).
1927-04-23	Friendly	Dublin, Lansdowne Road	Italy B team	1–2	FAIFS	Unofficial match. Bill Lacey oldest player to debut for FAI aged 37. Crowd: 20,000.
1928-02-12	Friendly	Liège, Standard Liège Stadium	Belgium	4–2	FAIFS	
1929-04-30	Friendly	Dublin, Dalymount Park	Belgium	4–0	FAIFS	John Joe Flood hat-trick.
1930-05-11	Friendly	Brussels, Parc du Meir	Belgium	3–1	FAIFS	Bill Lacey aged 41 oldest to play for FAI XI.
1931-04-26	Friendly	Barcelona, Montjuïc Stadium	Spain	1–1	FAIFS	
1931-12-13	Friendly	Dublin, Dalymount Park	Spain	0–5	Lacey	Patsy Gallacher (40) becomes oldest debutant Manager: Bill Lacey
1932-05-08	Friendly	Amsterdam, De Meer Stadion	Netherlands	2–0	FAIFS	
1934-02-25	World Cup 1934 qualifier	Dublin, Dalymount Park	Belgium	4–4	Lacey	Four goals by Paddy Moore.
1934-04-08	World Cup 1934 qualifier	Amsterdam, De Meer Stadion	Netherlands	2–5	FAIFS	
1934-12-15	Friendly	Dublin, Dalymount Park	Hungary	2–4	FAIFS	
1935-05-05	Friendly	Basel, St. Jakob Park	Switzerland	0–1	FAIFS	
1935-05-08	Friendly	Dortmund, Kampfbahn Rote Erde	Germany	1–3	FAIFS	
1935-12-08	Friendly	Dublin, Dalymount Park	Netherlands	3–5	Lacey	
1936-03-17	Friendly	Dublin, Dalymount Park	Switzerland	1–0	FAIFS	Team name changed from "Irish Free State" to "Ireland".
1936-05-03	Friendly	Budapest, Hungaria Uti Stadium	Hungary	3–3	FAI	Manager: Football Association of Ireland. FAI name re-adopted in 1936.
1936-05-06	Friendly	Köln	Rhineland XI	1–4	FAI	Unofficial match.
1936-05-09	Friendly	Luxembourg, Stade Municipal	Luxembourg	5–1	FAI	
1936-10-17	Friendly	Dublin, Dalymount Park	Germany	5–2	Lacey	Crowd: 28,000. The German team performed Nazi salutes during the playing of their national anthem.
1936-12-06	Friendly	Dublin, Dalymount Park	Hungary	2–3	FAI	
1937-05-17	Friendly	Bern, Wankdorfstadion	Switzerland	1–0	FAI	
1937-05-23	Friendly	Paris, Stade Colombes	France	2–0	FAI	
1937-10-10	World Cup 1938 qualifier	Oslo, Ullevaal Stadion	Norway	2–3	FAI	
1937-11-07	World Cup 1938 qualifier	Dublin, Dalymount Park	Norway	3–3	FAI	
1938-05-18	Friendly	Prague, Sparta Stadium	Czechoslovakia	2–2	FAI	
1938-05-22	Friendly	Warsaw, Polish Army Stadium	Poland	0–6	FAI	
1938-09-18	Friendly	Dublin, Dalymount Park	Switzerland	4–0	FAI	
1938-11-13	Friendly	Dublin, Dalymount Park	Poland	3–2	FAI	
1939-03-19	Friendly	Cork, The Mardyke	Hungary	2–2	FAI	First international match held in Cork.
1939-05-18	Friendly	Budapest, MTK Stadium	Hungary	2–2	FAI	
1939-05-23	Friendly	Bremen, Weserstadion	Germany	1–1	FAI	Final pre-war match.
1940-04-28	Friendly	Dublin, Dalymount Park	Scotland XI	2–3	FAI	Unofficial wartime match.
1946-06-16	Friendly	Lisbon, Estádio da Luz	Portugal	1–3	FAI	First post-war match.
1946-06-23	Friendly	Madrid, Estadio Metropolitano	Spain	1–0	FAI	
1946-09-30	Friendly	Dublin, Dalymount Park	England	0–1	FAI	
1947-03-02	Friendly	Dublin, Dalymount Park	Spain	3–2	FAI	Crowd: 42,102.
1947-05-04	Friendly	Dublin, Dalymount Park	Portugal	0–2	FAI	
1948-05-23	Friendly	Lisbon, Estádio da Luz	Portugal	0–2	FAI	
1948-05-30	Friendly	Barcelona, Montjuïc Stadium	Spain	1–2	FAI	
1948-07-26	1948 Summer Olympics	Portsmouth, Fratton Park	Netherlands	1–3	FAI	
1948-12-05	Friendly	Dublin, Dalymount Park	Switzerland	0–1	FAI	
1949-04-24	Friendly	Dublin, Dalymount Park	Belgium	0–2	FAI	
1949-05-22	Friendly	Dublin, Dalymount Park	Portugal	1–0	FAI	
1949-06-02	World Cup 1950 qualifier	Solna, Råsunda Stadium	Sweden	1–3	FAI	
1949-06-12	Friendly	Dublin, Dalymount Park	Spain	1–4	FAI	
1949-09-08	World Cup 1950 qualifier	Dublin, Dalymount Park	Finland	3–0	FAI	
1949-09-21	Friendly	Liverpool, Goodison Park	England	2–0	FAI	England's first home defeat by non-British side. Crowd: 51,047.
1949-10-09	World Cup 1950 qualifier	Helsinki, Olympiastadion	Finland	1–1	FAI	
1949-11-13	World Cup 1950 qualifier	Dublin, Dalymount Park	Sweden	1–3	FAI	
1950-05-10	Friendly	Brussels, Century Stadium	Belgium	1–5	FAI	
1950-11-26	Friendly	Dublin, Dalymount Park	Norway	2–2	FAI	
1951-05-13	Friendly	Dublin, Dalymount Park	Argentina	0–1	FAI	
1951-05-30	Friendly	Oslo, Ullevaal Stadion	Norway	3–2	FAI	
1951-10-17	Friendly	Dublin, Dalymount Park	West Germany	3–2	FAI	
1952-05-04	Friendly	Köln, Müngersdorfer Stadion	West Germany	0–3	FAI	
1952-05-07	Friendly	Vienna, Praeter Park	Austria	0–6	FAI	
1952-06-01	Friendly	Madrid, Estadio Chamartín	Spain	0–6	FAI	
1952-11-16	Friendly	Dublin, Dalymount Park	France	1–1	FAI	
1953-03-25	Friendly	Dublin, Dalymount Park	Austria	4–0	FAI	
1953-10-04	World Cup 1954 qualifier	Dublin, Dalymount Park	France	3–5	FAI	FIFA renamed team from "Ireland" to "Republic of Ireland".
1953-10-28	World Cup 1954 qualifier	Dublin, Dalymount Park	Luxembourg	4–0	FAI	
1953-11-25	World Cup 1954 qualifier	Paris, Parc des Princes	France	0–1	FAI	
1954-03-07	World Cup 1954 qualifier	Luxembourg, Stade Municipal	Luxembourg	1–0	FAI	
1954-11-07	Friendly	Dublin, Dalymount Park	Norway	2–1	FAI	
1955-05-01	Friendly	Dublin, Dalymount Park	Netherlands	1–0	FAI	
1955-05-25	Friendly	Oslo, Bislett Stadion	Norway	3–1	FAI	
1955-05-28	Friendly	Hamburg, Volksparkstadion	West Germany	1–2	FAI	
1955-10-19	Friendly	Dublin, Dalymount Park	Yugoslavia	1–4	FAI	Liam Tuohy debut. Archbishop McQuaid called for a boycott of the match with communists, but the stadium was filled.
1955-11-27	Friendly	Dublin, Dalymount Park	Spain	2–2	FAI	
1956-05-10	Friendly	Rotterdam, Feijenoord Stadion	Netherlands	4–1	FAI	
1956-10-03	World Cup 1958 qualifier	Dublin, Dalymount Park	Denmark	2–1	FAI	
1956-11-25	Friendly	Dublin, Dalymount Park	West Germany	3–0	FAI	Ireland defeated the world champions.
1957-05-08	World Cup 1958 qualifier	London, Wembley Stadium	England	1–5	FAI	
1957-05-19	World Cup 1958 qualifier	Dublin, Dalymount Park	England	1–1	FAI	Record Dalymount Park crowd: 47,600. Gate: .
1957-10-02	World Cup 1958 qualifier	Copenhagen, Idrætsparken	Denmark	2–0	FAI	
1958-05-11	Friendly	Chorzów, Stadion Slaski	Poland	2–2	FAI	Crowd: 100,000.
1958-05-14	Friendly	Vienna, Praeter Park	Austria	1–3	FAI	
1958-10-05	Friendly	Dublin, Dalymount Park	Poland	2–2	FAI	
1959-04-05	European Nations' Cup 1960 qualifier	Dublin, Dalymount Park	Czechoslovakia	2–0	FAI	Liam Tuohy scored his first goal for Ireland. Crowd: 37,500.
1959-05-10	European Nations' Cup 1960 qualifier	Bratislava, Tehelné Pole Štadión	Czechoslovakia	0–4	FAI	Crowd: 41,691.
1959-11-01	Friendly	Dublin, Dalymount Park	Sweden	3–2	FAI	John Giles debut aged 18.
1960-03-30	Friendly	Dublin, Dalymount Park	Chile	2–0	FAI	
1960-05-11	Friendly	Düsseldorf, Rheinstadion	West Germany	1–0	FAI	
1960-05-18	Friendly	Malmö, Malmö Stadion	Sweden	1–4	FAI	
1960-09-28	Friendly	Dublin, Dalymount Park	Wales	2–3	FAI	
1960-11-06	Friendly	Dublin, Dalymount Park	Norway	3–1	FAI	
1961-05-03	World Cup 1962 qualifier	Glasgow, Hampden Park	Scotland	1–4	FAI	Mick Meagan debut.
1961-05-07	World Cup 1962 qualifier	Dublin, Dalymount Park	Scotland	0–3	FAI	
1961-10-08	World Cup 1962 qualifier	Dublin, Dalymount Park	Czechoslovakia	1–3	FAI	
1961-10-29	World Cup 1962 qualifier	Prague, Strahov Stadium	Czechoslovakia	1–7	FAI	No qualifying points earned.
1962-04-08	Friendly	Dublin, Dalymount Park	Austria	2–3	FAI	
1962-08-12	European Nations' Cup 1964 qualifier	Dublin, Dalymount Park	Iceland	4–2	FAI	
1962-09-02	European Nations' Cup 1964 qualifier	Reykjavík, Laugardalsvöllur	Iceland	1–1	FAI	
1963-06-09	Friendly	Dublin, Dalymount Park	Scotland	1–0	FAI	
1963-09-25	European Nations' Cup 1964 qualifier	Vienna, Praterstadion	Austria	0–0	FAI	
1963-10-13	European Nations' Cup 1964 qualifier	Dublin, Dalymount Park	Austria	3–2	FAI	
1964-03-11	European Nations' Cup 1964 qualifier	Seville, Estadio Ramón Sánchez Pizjuán	Spain	1–5	FAI	
1964-04-08	European Nations' Cup 1964 qualifier	Dublin, Dalymount Park	Spain	0–2	FAI	
1964-05-10	Friendly	Kraków, Stadion Wisly	Poland	1–3	FAI	
1964-05-13	Friendly	Oslo, Ullevaal Stadion	Norway	4–1	FAI	
1964-05-24	Friendly	Dublin, Dalymount Park	England	1–3	FAI	
1964-10-25	Friendly	Dublin, Dalymount Park	Poland	3–2	FAI	
1965-03-24	Friendly	Dublin, Dalymount Park	Belgium	0–2	FAI	Liam Tuohy's final appearance.
1965-05-05	World Cup 1966 qualifier	Dublin, Dalymount Park	Spain	1–0	FAI	
1965-10-27	World Cup 1966 qualifier	Seville, Estadio Ramón Sánchez Pizjuán	Spain	1–4	FAI	
1965-11-10	World Cup 1966 play-off	Paris, Stade Colombes	Spain	0–1	FAI	Ireland eliminated.
1966-05-04	Friendly	Dublin, Dalymount Park	West Germany	0–4	FAI	
1966-05-22	Friendly	Vienna, Praterstadion	Austria	0–1	FAI	
1966-05-25	Friendly	Liège, Stade Maurice Dufrasne	Belgium	3–2	FAI	
1966-10-23	European Championship 1968 qualifier	Dublin, Dalymount Park	Spain	0–0	FAI	European Nations' Cup name changed to European Football Championship.
1966-11-16	European Championship 1968 qualifier	Dublin, Dalymount Park	Turkey	2–1	FAI	
1966-12-07	European Championship 1968 qualifier	Valencia, Estadio Mestalla	Spain	0–2	FAI	
1967-02-22	European Championship 1968 qualifier	Ankara, 19 Mayıs Stadium	Turkey	1–2	FAI	
1967-05-21	European Championship 1968 qualifier	Dublin, Dalymount Park	Czechoslovakia	0–2	FAI	
1967-11-22	European Championship 1968 qualifier	Prague, Slavia Stadium	Czechoslovakia	2–1	FAI	
1968-05-15	Friendly	Dublin, Dalymount Park	Poland	2–2	FAI	
1968-10-30	Friendly	Chorzów, Stadion Slaski	Poland	0–1	FAI	
1968-11-10	Friendly	Dublin, Dalymount Park	Austria	2–2	FAI	
1968-12-04	World Cup 1970 qualifier	Dublin, Dalymount Park	Denmark	1–1	FAI	Abandoned at 51 minutes because of fog. Replayed 1969-10-15.
1969-05-04	World Cup 1970 qualifier	Dublin, Dalymount Park	Czechoslovakia	1–2	FAI	
1969-05-27	World Cup 1970 qualifier	Copenhagen, Idrætsparken	Denmark	0–2	FAI	Don Givens debut.
1969-06-08	World Cup 1970 qualifier	Dublin, Dalymount Park	Hungary	1–2	FAI	
1969-09-21	Friendly	Dublin, Dalymount Park	Scotland	1–1	Meagan	New manager: Mick Meagan.
1969-10-07	World Cup 1970 qualifier	Prague, Sparta Stadium	Czechoslovakia	0–3	Meagan	
1969-10-15	World Cup 1970 qualifier	Dublin, Dalymount Park	Denmark	1–1	Meagan	Replay of 1968-12-04 Denmark match.
1969-11-05	World Cup 1970 qualifier	Budapest, Népstadion	Hungary	0–4	Meagan	John Dempsey, red card. First Irish player ever to be sent off.
1970-05-06	Friendly	Poznań, Warta Stadion	Poland	1–2	Meagan	
1970-05-09	Friendly	West Berlin, Olympiastadion	West Germany	1–2	Meagan	
1970-09-23	Friendly	Dublin, Dalymount Park	Poland	0–2	Meagan	Steve Heighway debut.
1970-10-14	European Championship 1972 qualifier	Dublin, Dalymount Park	Sweden	1–1	Meagan	
1970-10-28	European Championship 1972 qualifier	Solna, Råsunda Stadium	Sweden	0–1	Meagan	
1970-12-08	European Championship 1972 qualifier	Florence, Stadio Artemio Franchi	Italy	0–3	Meagan	
1971-05-10	European Championship 1972 qualifier	Dublin, Lansdowne Road	Italy	1–2	Meagan	
1971-05-24	Friendly	Dublin, Lansdowne Road	England XI	1–1	Meagan	Unofficial match to celebrate the Golden Jubilee of the Football Association of Ireland.
1971-05-30	European Championship 1972 qualifier	Dublin, Dalymount Park	Austria	1–4	Meagan	Jimmy Holmes debut.
1971-10-10	European Championship 1972 qualifier	Linz, Linzer Stadion	Austria	0–6	Tuohy	New manager: Liam Tuohy.
1972-01-04	Friendly	Dublin, Dalymount Park	West German Olympic XI	3–0	Tuohy	Unofficial match. First win since 1967 (four years).
1972-06-11	Brazil Independence Cup	Recife, Santa Crux Stadium	Iran	2–1	Tuohy	Tournament to mark the 150th anniversary of Brazilian independence.
1972-06-18	Brazil Independence Cup	Natal, Machadão	Ecuador	3–2	Tuohy	Friendly.
1972-06-21	Brazil Independence Cup	Recife, Estádio Ilha do Retiro	Chile	1–2	Tuohy	Friendly.
1972-06-25	Brazil Independence Cup	Recife, Estádio Ilha do Retiro	Portugal	1–2	Tuohy	Friendly.
1972-10-18	World Cup 1974 qualifier	Dublin, Lansdowne Road	Soviet Union	1–2	Tuohy	Alan Kelly, Sr. first goalkeeper to captain Ireland.
1972-11-15	World Cup 1974 qualifier	Dublin, Dalymount Park	France	2–1	Tuohy	
1973-05-13	World Cup 1974 qualifier	Moscow, Lenin Stadium	Soviet Union	0–1	Tuohy	
1973-05-16	Friendly	Wrocław, Olympic Stadium	Poland	0–2	Tuohy	
1973-05-19	World Cup 1974 qualifier	Paris, Parc des Princes	France	1–1	Tuohy	
1973-06-06	Friendly	Oslo, Ullevaal Stadion	Norway	1–1	Thomas	Manager: Seán Thomas.
1973-07-03	Friendly	Dublin, Lansdowne Road	Brazil	3–4	Tuohy	Unofficial match. See: Shamrock Rovers XI vs Brazil. Crowd: 34,000.
1973-10-21	Friendly	Dublin, Dalymount Park	Poland	1–0	Giles	New manager: John Giles.
1974-05-05	Friendly	Rio de Janeiro, Estádio do Maracanã	Brazil	1–2	Giles	
1974-05-08	Friendly	Montevideo, Estadio Centenario	Uruguay	0–2	Giles	
1974-05-12	Friendly	Santiago, Estadio Nacional	Chile	2–1	Giles	
1974-10-30	European Championship 1976 qualifier	Dublin, Dalymount Park	Soviet Union	3–0	Giles	Don Givens hat-trick.
1974-11-20	European Championship 1976 qualifier	İzmir, Atatürk Olympic Stadium	Turkey	1–1	Giles	
1975-03-11	Friendly	Dublin, Dalymount Park	West Germany B team	1–0	Giles	Unofficial match.
1975-05-11	European Championship 1976 qualifier	Dublin, Dalymount Park	Switzerland	2–1	Giles	
1975-05-18	European Championship 1976 qualifier	Kiev, Central Stadium	Soviet Union	1–2	Giles	Crowd: 100,000.
1975-05-21	European Championship 1976 qualifier	Bern, Wankdorfstadion	Switzerland	0–1	Giles	
1975-10-29	European Championship 1976 qualifier	Dublin, Dalymount Park	Turkey	4–0	Giles	Four goals by Don Givens.
1976-03-24	Friendly	Dublin, Dalymount Park	Norway	3–0	Giles	
1976-05-26	Friendly	Poznań, Warta Stadion	Poland	2–0	Giles	
1976-09-08	Friendly	London, Wembley Stadium	England	1–1	Giles	David O'Leary debut aged 18.
1976-10-13	Friendly	Ankara, 19 Mayıs Stadium	Turkey	3–3	Giles	Frank Stapleton debut aged 20.
1976-11-17	World Cup 1978 qualifier	Paris, Parc des Princes	France	0–2	Giles	
1977-02-09	Friendly	Dublin, Lansdowne Road	Spain	0–1	Giles	
1977-03-30	World Cup 1978 qualifier	Dublin, Lansdowne Road	France	1–0	Giles	
1977-04-24	Friendly	Dublin, Dalymount Park	Poland	0–0	Giles	
1977-06-01	World Cup 1978 qualifier	Sofia, Vasil Levski National Stadium	Bulgaria	1–2	Giles	
1977-10-12	World Cup 1978 qualifier	Dublin, Lansdowne Road	Bulgaria	0–0	Giles	
1978-04-05	Friendly	Dublin, Lansdowne Road	Turkey	4–2	Giles	
1978-04-12	Friendly	Łódź, Stadion ŁKS	Poland	0–3	Giles	
1978-05-21	Friendly	Oslo, Ullevaal Stadion	Norway	0–0	Giles	
1978-05-24	European Championship 1980 qualifier	Copenhagen, Idrætsparken	Denmark	3–3	Giles	
1978-09-20	European Championship 1980 qualifier	Dublin, Lansdowne Road	Northern Ireland	0–0	Giles	First official international match against Northern Ireland.
1978-10-25	European Championship 1980 qualifier	Dublin, Lansdowne Road	England	1–1	Giles	
1979-05-02	European Championship 1980 qualifier	Dublin, Lansdowne Road	Denmark	2–0	Giles	
1979-05-19	European Championship 1980 qualifier	Sofia, Vasil Levski National Stadium	Bulgaria	0–1	Giles	
1979-05-22	Friendly	Dublin, Lansdowne Road	West Germany	1–3	Giles	
1979-05-29	Friendly	Dublin, Lansdowne Road	Argentina	0–0	Giles	Unofficial match. UNICEF charity match.
1979-08-16	Friendly	Bilbao, San Mamés Stadium	Basque Country	1–4	Giles	Unofficial match. First Basque international since 1939, owing to Francoist Spain.
1979-09-11	Friendly	Swansea, Vetch Field	Wales	1–2	Giles	
1979-09-26	Friendly	Prague, Stadion Evžena Rošického	Czechoslovakia	1–4	Giles	
1979-10-17	European Championship 1980 qualifier	Dublin, Lansdowne Road	Bulgaria	3–0	Giles	
1979-10-29	Friendly	Dublin, Dalymount Park	United States	3–2	Giles	Chris Hughton became first mixed-race player for Ireland.
1979-11-21	European Championship 1980 qualifier	Belfast, Windsor Park	Northern Ireland	0–1	Giles	
1980-02-06	European Championship 1980 qualifier	London, Wembley Stadium	England	0–2	Giles	
1980-03-26	World Cup 1982 qualifier	Nicosia, Makario Stadium	Cyprus	3–2	Giles	
1980-04-30	Friendly	Dublin, Lansdowne Road	Switzerland	2–0	Kelly	Manager: Alan Kelly, Sr.
1980-05-16	Friendly	Dublin, Lansdowne Road	Argentina	0–1	Hand	New manager: Eoin Hand.
1980-09-10	World Cup 1982 qualifier	Dublin, Lansdowne Road	Netherlands	2–1	Hand	
1980-10-15	World Cup 1982 qualifier	Dublin, Lansdowne Road	Belgium	1–1	Hand	
1980-10-28	World Cup 1982 qualifier	Paris, Parc des Princes	France	0–2	Hand	
1980-11-19	World Cup 1982 qualifier	Dublin, Lansdowne Road	Cyprus	6–0	Hand	
1981-02-24	Friendly	Dublin, Tolka Park	Wales	1–3	Hand	
1981-03-25	World Cup 1982 qualifier	Brussels, Stade du Heysel	Belgium	0–1	Hand	Ireland eliminated by France on goal difference.
1981-04-29	Friendly	Dublin, Lansdowne Road	Czechoslovakia	3–1	Hand	Ronnie Whelan debut aged 19.
1981-05-21	Friendly	Bremen, Weserstadion	West Germany B team	0–3	Hand	Unofficial match.
1981-05-24	Friendly	Bydgoszcz, Zdzisław Krzyszkowiak Stadium	Poland	0–3	Hand	Packie Bonner debut.
1981-09-09	World Cup 1982 qualifier	Rotterdam, Feijenoord Stadion	Netherlands	2–2	Hand	
1981-10-14	World Cup 1982 qualifier	Dublin, Lansdowne Road	France	3–2	Hand	
1982-04-28	Friendly	Algiers, Olympic Stadium	Algeria	0–2	Hand	Crowd: 60,000.
1982-05-22	Friendly	Santiago, Estadio Nacional	Chile	0–1	Hand	
1982-05-27	Friendly	Uberlândia, Estádio Parque do Sabiá	Brazil	0–7	Hand	Worst defeat.
1982-05-30	Friendly	Port of Spain, Arima Stadium	Trinidad and Tobago	1–2	Hand	
1982-09-22	European Championship 1984 qualifier	Rotterdam, Feijenoord Stadion	Netherlands	1–2	Hand	
1982-10-13	European Championship 1984 qualifier	Dublin, Lansdowne Road	Iceland	2–0	Hand	
1982-11-17	European Championship 1984 qualifier	Dublin, Lansdowne Road	Spain	3–3	Hand	
1983-03-30	European Championship 1984 qualifier	Valletta, Ta'Qali Stadium	Malta	1–0	Hand	
1983-04-27	European Championship 1984 qualifier	Zaragoza, Estadio La Romareda	Spain	0–2	Hand	
1983-09-21	European Championship 1984 qualifier	Reykjavík, Laugardalsvöllur	Iceland	3–0	Hand	
1983-10-12	European Championship 1984 qualifier	Dublin, Dalymount Park	Netherlands	2–3	Hand	
1983-11-16	European Championship 1984 qualifier	Dublin, Dalymount Park	Malta	8–0	Hand	Best win.
1984-04-04	Friendly	Tel Aviv, Bloomfield Stadium	Israel	0–3	Hand	
1984-05-23	Friendly	Dublin, Dalymount Park	Poland	0–0	Hand	
1984-05-27	Kirin Cup / Friendly	Japan	Japan Universiade XI	0–0	Hand	Unofficial match.
1984-06-01	Kirin Cup / Friendly	Japan	Internacional	0–0	Hand	Unofficial match.
1984-06-03	Kirin Cup / Friendly	Japan, Sapporo	China	1–0	Hand	This match recognised as an official international match.
1984-06-05	Kirin Cup / Friendly	Japan	Internacional	1–2	Hand	Unofficial match. Ireland's first appearance in the final of an international football competition.
1984-08-08	Friendly	Dublin, Dalymount Park	Mexico	0–0	Hand	
1984-09-12	World Cup 1986 qualifier	Dublin, Lansdowne Road	Soviet Union	1–0	Hand	
1984-10-17	World Cup 1986 qualifier	Oslo, Ullevaal Stadion	Norway	0–1	Hand	
1984-11-14	World Cup 1986 qualifier	Copenhagen, Idrætsparken	Denmark	0–3	Hand	
1985-02-05	Friendly	Dublin, Dalymount Park	Italy	1–2	Hand	
1985-02-27	Friendly	Ramat Gan, Ramat Gan Stadium	Israel	0–0	Hand	
1985-03-26	Friendly	London, Wembley Stadium	England	1–2	Hand	
1985-05-01	World Cup 1986 qualifier	Dublin, Lansdowne Road	Norway	0–0	Hand	
1985-05-26	Friendly	Cork, Flower Lodge	Spain	0–0	Hand	
1985-06-02	World Cup 1986 qualifier	Dublin, Lansdowne Road	Switzerland	3–0	Hand	
1985-09-11	World Cup 1986 qualifier	Bern, Wankdorfstadion	Switzerland	0–0	Hand	
1985-10-16	World Cup 1986 qualifier	Moscow, Lenin Stadium	Soviet Union	0–2	Hand	Crowd: 103,000 (largest crowd).
1985-11-13	World Cup 1986 qualifier	Dublin, Lansdowne Road	Denmark	1–4	Hand	
1986-03-26	Friendly	Dublin, Lansdowne Road	Wales	0–1	Charlton	New manager: Jack Charlton.
1986-04-23	Friendly	Dublin, Lansdowne Road	Uruguay	1–1	Charlton	
1986-05-25	Iceland Triangular Tournament	Reykjavík, Laugardalsvöllur	Iceland	2–1	Charlton	Niall Quinn debut.
1986-05-27	Iceland Triangular Tournament	Reykjavík, Laugardalsvöllur	Czechoslovakia	1–0	Charlton	Ireland won their first international tournament. Crowd: 1,000.
1986-09-10	European Championship 1988 qualifier	Brussels, Constant Vanden Stock Stadium	Belgium	2–2	Charlton	
1986-10-15	European Championship 1988 qualifier	Dublin, Lansdowne Road	Scotland	0–0	Charlton	
1986-11-12	Friendly	Warsaw, Stadion Wojska Polskiego	Poland	0–1	Charlton	
1987-02-18	European Championship 1988 qualifier	Glasgow, Hampden Park	Scotland	1–0	Charlton	
1987-04-01	European Championship 1988 qualifier	Sofia, Vasil Levski National Stadium	Bulgaria	1–2	Charlton	
1987-04-29	European Championship 1988 qualifier	Dublin, Lansdowne Road	Belgium	0–0	Charlton	
1987-05-23	Friendly	Dublin, Lansdowne Road	Brazil	1–0	Charlton	Crowd: 17,000. Scorer: Liam Brady.
1987-05-28	European Championship 1988 qualifier	Luxembourg, Stade Municipal	Luxembourg	2–0	Charlton	
1987-09-09	European Championship 1988 qualifier	Dublin, Lansdowne Road	Luxembourg	2–1	Charlton	
1987-10-14	European Championship 1988 qualifier	Dublin, Lansdowne Road	Bulgaria	2–0	Charlton	
1987-11-10	Friendly	Dublin, Dalymount Park	Israel	5–0	Charlton	
1988-03-23	Friendly	Dublin, Lansdowne Road	Romania	2–0	Charlton	
1988-04-27	Friendly	Dublin, Lansdowne Road	Yugoslavia	2–0	Charlton	
1988-05-22	Friendly	Dublin, Lansdowne Road	Poland	3–1	Charlton	
1988-06-01	Friendly	Oslo, Ullevaal Stadion	Norway	0–0	Charlton	
1988-06-12	European Championship 1988	Stuttgart, Neckarstadion	England	1–0	Charlton	First Irish appearance at European Championship tournament. Crowd: 51,573.
1988-06-15	European Championship 1988	Hanover, Niedersachsenstadion	Soviet Union	1–1	Charlton	Crowd: 38,308.
1988-06-18	European Championship 1988	Gelsenkirchen, Parkstadion	Netherlands	0–1	Charlton	Crowd: 60,800. Eliminated team welcomed home by 200,000 people.
1988-09-14	World Cup 1990 qualifier	Belfast, Windsor Park	Northern Ireland	0–0	Charlton	
1988-10-19	Friendly	Dublin, Lansdowne Road	Tunisia	4–0	Charlton	Steve Staunton debut.
1988-11-16	World Cup 1990 qualifier	Seville, Estadio Benito Villamarín	Spain	0–2	Charlton	
1989-02-07	Friendly	Dublin, Dalymount Park	France	0–0	Charlton	
1989-03-08	World Cup 1990 qualifier	Budapest, Népstadion	Hungary	0–0	Charlton	
1989-04-26	World Cup 1990 qualifier	Dublin, Lansdowne Road	Spain	1–0	Charlton	
1989-05-28	World Cup 1990 qualifier	Dublin, Lansdowne Road	Malta	2–0	Charlton	
1989-06-04	World Cup 1990 qualifier	Dublin, Lansdowne Road	Hungary	2–0	Charlton	
1989-09-06	Friendly	Dublin, Lansdowne Road	West Germany	1–1	Charlton	
1989-10-11	World Cup 1990 qualifier	Dublin, Lansdowne Road	Northern Ireland	3–0	Charlton	
1989-11-15	World Cup 1990 qualifier	Valletta, Ta'Qali Stadium	Malta	2–0	Charlton	John Aldridge's two goals gained Ireland their first World Cup qualification.
1990-03-28	Friendly	Dublin, Lansdowne Road	Wales	1–0	Charlton	
1990-04-25	Friendly	Dublin, Lansdowne Road	Soviet Union	1–0	Charlton	
1990-05-16	Friendly	Dublin, Lansdowne Road	Finland	1–1	Charlton	Liam Brady testimonial match.
1990-05-27	Friendly	İzmir, Atatürk Olympic Stadium	Turkey	0–0	Charlton	
1990-06-02	Friendly	Valletta, Ta'Qali Stadium	Malta	3–0	Charlton	
1990-06-11	World Cup 1990	Cagliari, Stadio Sant'Elia	England	1–1	Charlton	First Irish appearance at World Cup finals tournament.
1990-06-17	World Cup 1990	Palermo, Stadio La Favorita	Egypt	0–0	Charlton	
1990-06-21	World Cup 1990	Palermo, Stadio La Favorita	Netherlands	1–1	Charlton	Promoted to second round via 3 draws, 2 goals.
1990-06-25	World Cup 1990 round of 16	Genoa, Stadio Luigi Ferraris	Romania	5–4	Charlton	AET: 0–0. PSO: Ireland 5–4 Romania. Bonner saved 9th penalty. Unbeaten in 17 matches (record).
1990-06-30	World Cup 1990 quarter final	Rome, Stadio Olimpico	Italy	0–1	Charlton	Goal by Toto Schillaci. Eliminated team welcomed home by 500,000 people.
1990-09-12	Friendly	Dublin, Dalymount Park	Morocco	1–0	Charlton	Final international match at Dalymount Park.
1990-10-17	European Championship 1992 qualifier	Dublin, Lansdowne Road	Turkey	5–0	Charlton	
1990-11-14	European Championship 1992 qualifier	Dublin, Lansdowne Road	England	1–1	Charlton	
1991-02-06	Friendly	Wrexham, Racecourse Ground	Wales	3–0	Charlton	
1991-03-27	European Championship 1992 qualifier	London, Wembley Stadium	England	1–1	Charlton	
1991-05-01	European Championship 1992 qualifier	Dublin, Lansdowne Road	Poland	0–0	Charlton	
1991-05-22	Friendly	Dublin, Lansdowne Road	Chile	1–1	Charlton	Roy Keane debut.
1991-06-01	Friendly	Foxborough MA, Foxboro Stadium	United States	1–1	Charlton	
1991-09-11	Friendly	Győr, Stadion ETO	Hungary	2–1	Charlton	
1991-10-16	European Championship 1992 qualifier	Poznań, Stadion Lecha	Poland	3–3	Charlton	
1991-11-13	European Championship 1992 qualifier	Istanbul, İnönü Stadium	Turkey	3–1	Charlton	Unbeaten, yet failed to qualify for Euro 1992.
1992-02-19	Friendly	Dublin, RDS Arena	Wales	0–1	Charlton	
1992-03-25	Friendly	Dublin, Lansdowne Road	Switzerland	2–1	Charlton	
1992-04-29	Friendly	Dublin, Lansdowne Road	United States	4–1	Charlton	
1992-05-26	World Cup 1994 qualifier	Dublin, Lansdowne Road	Albania	2–0	Charlton	
1992-05-30	1992 US Cup	Washington, D.C., RFK Stadium	United States	1–3	Charlton	Friendly.
1992-06-04	1992 US Cup	Foxborough MA, Foxboro Stadium	Italy	0–2	Charlton	Goalkeeper Packie Bonner: red card after 64 minutes.
1992-06-07	1992 US Cup	Foxborough MA, Foxboro Stadium	Portugal	2–0	Charlton	Friendly.
1992-09-09	World Cup 1994 qualifier	Dublin, Lansdowne Road	Latvia	4–0	Charlton	
1992-10-14	World Cup 1994 qualifier	Copenhagen, Parken Stadium	Denmark	0–0	Charlton	
1992-11-18	World Cup 1994 qualifier	Seville, Estadio Ramón Sánchez Pizjuán	Spain	0–0	Charlton	
1993-02-17	Friendly	Dublin, Tolka Park	Wales	2–1	Charlton	
1993-03-31	World Cup 1994 qualifier	Dublin, Lansdowne Road	Northern Ireland	3–0	Charlton	
1993-04-28	World Cup 1994 qualifier	Dublin, Lansdowne Road	Denmark	1–1	Charlton	
1993-05-26	World Cup 1994 qualifier	Tirana, Qemal Stafa	Albania	2–1	Charlton	
1993-06-09	World Cup 1994 qualifier	Riga, Daugava Stadium	Latvia	2–0	Charlton	
1993-06-16	World Cup 1994 qualifier	Vilnius, Žalgiris Stadium	Lithuania	1–0	Charlton	
1993-09-08	World Cup 1994 qualifier	Dublin, Lansdowne Road	Lithuania	2–0	Charlton	
1993-10-13	World Cup 1994 qualifier	Dublin, Lansdowne Road	Spain	1–3	Charlton	First competitive home defeat in eight years, at "Fortress Lansdowne". Crowd: 50,000.
1993-11-17	World Cup 1994 qualifier	Belfast, Windsor Park	Northern Ireland	1–1	Charlton	Second World Cup qualification secured by Alan McLoughlin's goal.
1994-03-23	Friendly	Dublin, Lansdowne Road	Russia	0–0	Charlton	
1994-04-20	Friendly	Tilburg, Willem II Stadion	Netherlands	1–0	Charlton	
1994-05-24	Friendly	Dublin, Lansdowne Road	Bolivia	1–0	Charlton	
1994-05-29	Friendly	Hanover, Niedersachsenstadion	Germany	2–0	Charlton	
1994-06-05	Friendly	Dublin, Lansdowne Road	Czech Republic	1–3	Charlton	
1994-06-18	World Cup 1994	East Rutherford NJ, Giants Stadium	Italy	1–0	Charlton	First Irish World Cup match win in normal time scored by Ray Houghton.
1994-06-24	World Cup 1994	Orlando, Citrus Bowl	Mexico	1–2	Charlton	
1994-06-28	World Cup 1994	East Rutherford NJ, Giants Stadium	Norway	0–0	Charlton	
1994-07-04	World Cup 1994 round of 16	Orlando, Citrus Bowl	Netherlands	0–2	Charlton	
1994-09-07	Euro 1996 qualifier	Riga, Daugava Stadium	Latvia	3–0	Charlton	European Championship became known as Euro.
1994-10-12	Euro 1996 qualifier	Dublin, Lansdowne Road	Liechtenstein	4–0	Charlton	
1994-11-16	Euro 1996 qualifier	Belfast, Windsor Park	Northern Ireland	4–0	Charlton	
1995-02-15	Friendly	Dublin, Lansdowne Road	England	1–0	Charlton	Match abandoned after 27 minutes due to Lansdowne Road football riot by English neo-Nazis.
1995-03-29	Euro 1996 qualifier	Dublin, Lansdowne Road	Northern Ireland	1–1	Charlton	
1995-04-26	Euro 1996 qualifier	Dublin, Lansdowne Road	Portugal	1–0	Charlton	
1995-06-03	Euro 1996 qualifier	Eschen, Sportpark Eschen-Mauren	Liechtenstein	0–0	Charlton	
1995-06-11	Euro 1996 qualifier	Dublin, Lansdowne Road	Austria	1–3	Charlton	
1995-09-06	Euro 1996 qualifier	Vienna, Ernst-Happel-Stadion	Austria	1–3	Charlton	
1995-10-11	Euro 1996 qualifier	Dublin, Lansdowne Road	Latvia	2–1	Charlton	
1995-11-15	Euro 1996 qualifier	Lisbon, Estádio da Luz	Portugal	0–3	Charlton	
1995-12-13	Euro 1996 play-off	Liverpool, Anfield	Netherlands	0–2	Charlton	
1996-03-27	Friendly	Dublin, Lansdowne Road	Russia	0–2	McCarthy	New manager: Mick McCarthy. Shay Given debut.
1996-04-24	Friendly	Prague, Strahov Stadium	Czech Republic	0–2	McCarthy	
1996-05-29	Friendly	Dublin, Lansdowne Road	Portugal	0–1	McCarthy	
1996-06-02	Friendly	Dublin, Lansdowne Road	Croatia	2–2	McCarthy	
1996-06-04	Friendly	Rotterdam, Feijenoord Stadion	Netherlands	1–3	McCarthy	
1996-06-09	1996 US Cup	Foxborough MA, Foxboro Stadium	United States	1–2	McCarthy	Friendly.
1996-06-12	1996 US Cup	East Rutherford NJ, Giants Stadium	Mexico	2–2	McCarthy	Friendly.
1996-06-15	1996 US Cup	East Rutherford NJ, Giants Stadium	Bolivia	3–0	McCarthy	Friendly.
1996-08-31	World Cup 1998 qualifier	Eschen, Sportpark Eschen-Mauren	Liechtenstein	5–0	McCarthy	Best away win.
1996-10-09	World Cup 1998 qualifier	Dublin, Lansdowne Road	Macedonia	3–0	McCarthy	
1996-11-10	World Cup 1998 qualifier	Dublin, Lansdowne Road	Iceland	0–0	McCarthy	
1997-02-11	Friendly	Cardiff, Ninian Park	Wales	0–0	McCarthy	
1997-04-02	World Cup 1998 qualifier	Skopje, City Stadium	Macedonia	2–3	McCarthy	
1997-04-30	World Cup 1998 qualifier	Bucharest, Steaua Stadium	Romania	0–1	McCarthy	
1997-05-21	World Cup 1998 qualifier	Dublin, Lansdowne Road	Liechtenstein	5–0	McCarthy	David Connolly hat-trick.
1997-08-20	World Cup 1998 qualifier	Dublin, Lansdowne Road	Lithuania	0–0	McCarthy	
1997-09-06	World Cup 1998 qualifier	Reykjavík, Laugardalsvöllur	Iceland	4–2	McCarthy	Kevin Kilbane debut.
1997-09-10	World Cup 1998 qualifier	Vilnius, Žalgiris Stadium	Lithuania	2–1	McCarthy	
1997-10-11	World Cup 1998 qualifier	Dublin, Lansdowne Road	Romania	1–1	McCarthy	
1997-10-29	World Cup 1998 play-off	Dublin, Lansdowne Road	Belgium	1–1	McCarthy	
1997-11-15	World Cup 1998 play-off	Brussels, Stade Roi Baudouin	Belgium	1–2	McCarthy	
1998-03-25	Friendly	Olomouc, Andrův stadion	Czech Republic	1–2	McCarthy	Robbie Keane and Damien Duff debuts.
1998-04-22	Friendly	Dublin, Lansdowne Road	Argentina	0–2	McCarthy	
1998-05-23	Friendly	Dublin, Lansdowne Road	Mexico	0–0	McCarthy	
1998-09-05	Euro 2000 qualifier	Dublin, Lansdowne Road	Croatia	2–0	McCarthy	
1998-10-14	Euro 2000 qualifier	Dublin, Lansdowne Road	Malta	5–0	McCarthy	Robbie Keane scored two goals and became youngest player to score for Ireland, aged 18.
1998-11-18	Euro 2000 qualifier	Belgrade, Stadion Crvene Zvezde	Yugoslavia	0–1	McCarthy	
1999-02-10	Friendly	Dublin, Lansdowne Road	Paraguay	2–0	McCarthy	
1999-04-28	Friendly	Dublin, Lansdowne Road	Sweden	2–0	McCarthy	
1999-05-29	Friendly	Dublin, Lansdowne Road	Northern Ireland	0–1	McCarthy	
1999-06-09	Euro 2000 qualifier	Dublin, Lansdowne Road	Macedonia	1–0	McCarthy	
1999-09-01	Euro 2000 qualifier	Dublin, Lansdowne Road	Yugoslavia	2–1	McCarthy	
1999-09-04	Euro 2000 qualifier	Zagreb, Stadion Maksimir	Croatia	0–1	McCarthy	
1999-09-08	Euro 2000 qualifier	Valletta, Ta'Qali Stadium	Malta	3–2	McCarthy	
1999-10-09	Euro 2000 qualifier	Skopje, City Stadium	Macedonia	1–1	McCarthy	
1999-11-13	Euro 2000 play-off	Dublin, Lansdowne Road	Turkey	1–1	McCarthy	
1999-11-17	Euro 2000 play-off	Bursa, Atatürk Olympic Stadium	Turkey	0–0	McCarthy	
2000-02-23	Friendly	Dublin, Lansdowne Road	Czech Republic	3–2	McCarthy	
2000-04-26	Friendly	Dublin, Lansdowne Road	Greece	0–1	McCarthy	
2000-05-30	Friendly	Dublin, Lansdowne Road	Scotland	1–2	McCarthy	
2000-06-04	2000 US Cup	Chicago, Soldier Field	Mexico	2–2	McCarthy	Friendly.
2000-06-06	2000 US Cup	Foxborough MA, Foxboro Stadium	United States	1–1	McCarthy	Friendly.
2000-06-11	2000 US Cup	East Rutherford NJ, Giants Stadium	South Africa	2–1	McCarthy	Friendly.
2000-09-02	World Cup 2002 qualifier	Amsterdam Arena	Netherlands	2–2	McCarthy	
2000-10-07	World Cup 2002 qualifier	Lisbon, Estádio da Luz	Portugal	1–1	McCarthy	
2000-10-11	World Cup 2002 qualifier	Dublin, Lansdowne Road	Estonia	2–0	McCarthy	
2000-11-15	Friendly	Dublin, Lansdowne Road	Finland	3–0	McCarthy	
2001-03-24	World Cup 2002 qualifier	Nicosia, GSP Stadium	Cyprus	4–0	McCarthy	
2001-03-28	World Cup 2002 qualifier	Barcelona, Mini Estadi	Andorra	3–0	McCarthy	
2001-04-25	World Cup 2002 qualifier	Dublin, Lansdowne Road	Andorra	3–1	McCarthy	
2001-06-02	World Cup 2002 qualifier	Dublin, Lansdowne Road	Portugal	1–1	McCarthy	
2001-06-06	World Cup 2002 qualifier	Tallinn, Lilleküla Stadium	Estonia	2–0	McCarthy	
2001-08-15	Friendly	Dublin, Lansdowne Road	Croatia	2–2	McCarthy	John O'Shea debut.
2001-09-01	World Cup 2002 qualifier	Dublin, Lansdowne Road	Netherlands	1–0	McCarthy	
2001-10-06	World Cup 2002 qualifier	Dublin, Lansdowne Road	Cyprus	4–0	McCarthy	
2001-11-10	World Cup 2002 play-off	Dublin, Lansdowne Road	Iran	2–0	McCarthy	Unbeaten in 16 matches.
2001-11-15	World Cup 2002 play-off	Tehran, Azadi Stadium	Iran	0–1	McCarthy	Crowd: 100,000.
2002-02-13	Friendly	Dublin, Lansdowne Road	Russia	2–0	McCarthy	
2002-03-27	Friendly	Dublin, Lansdowne Road	Denmark	3–0	McCarthy	
2002-04-17	Friendly	Dublin, Lansdowne Road	United States	2–1	McCarthy	
2002-05-16	Friendly	Dublin, Lansdowne Road	Nigeria	1–2	McCarthy	
2002-06-01	World Cup 2002	Niigata, Niigata Stadium	Cameroon	1–1	McCarthy	Ireland's third World Cup preceded by Saipan Incident drama.
2002-06-05	World Cup 2002	Ibaraki, Kashima Stadium	Germany	1–1	McCarthy	Steve Staunton became the first Irish player to reach 100 caps.
2002-06-11	World Cup 2002	Yokohama, International Stadium	Saudi Arabia	3–0	McCarthy	First World Cup match where Ireland scored more than one goal.
2002-06-16	World Cup 2002 round of 16	Suwon, Suwon World Cup Stadium	Spain	2–3	McCarthy	After extra time: 1–1. Penalty shoot out: Ireland 2–3 Spain.
2002-08-21	Friendly	Helsinki, Olympiastadion	Finland	3–0	McCarthy	
2002-09-07	Euro 2004 qualifier	Moscow, Dynamo Stadium	Russia	2–4	McCarthy	
2002-10-16	Euro 2004 qualifier	Dublin, Lansdowne Road	Switzerland	1–2	McCarthy	
2002-11-20	Friendly	Athens, Leoforos Alexandras Stadium	Greece	0–0	Givens	Manager: Don Givens.
2003-02-12	Friendly	Glasgow, Hampden Park	Scotland	2–0	Kerr	New manager: Brian Kerr.
2003-03-29	Euro 2004 qualifier	Tbilisi, Mikheil Meskhi Stadium	Georgia	2–1	Kerr	
2003-04-02	Euro 2004 qualifier	Tirana, Qemal Stafa	Albania	0–0	Kerr	
2003-04-30	Friendly	Dublin, Lansdowne Road	Norway	1–0	Kerr	
2003-06-07	Euro 2004 qualifier	Dublin, Lansdowne Road	Albania	2–1	Kerr	
2003-06-11	Euro 2004 qualifier	Dublin, Lansdowne Road	Georgia	2–0	Kerr	
2003-08-19	Friendly	Dublin, Lansdowne Road	Australia	2–1	Kerr	
2003-09-06	Euro 2004 qualifier	Dublin, Lansdowne Road	Russia	1–1	Kerr	
2003-09-09	Friendly	Dublin, Lansdowne Road	Turkey	2–2	Kerr	
2003-10-11	Euro 2004 qualifier	Basel, St. Jakob Park	Switzerland	0–2	Kerr	
2003-11-18	Friendly	Dublin, Lansdowne Road	Canada	3–0	Kerr	
2004-02-18	Friendly	Dublin, Lansdowne Road	Brazil	0–0	Kerr	
2004-03-31	Friendly	Dublin, Lansdowne Road	Czech Republic	2–1	Kerr	
2004-04-28	Friendly	Bydgoszcz, Zdzisław Krzyszkowiak Stadium	Poland	0–0	Kerr	
2004-05-27	Friendly	Dublin, Lansdowne Road	Romania	1–0	Kerr	
2004-05-29	Unity Cup	Charlton, The Valley Stadium	Nigeria	0–3	Kerr	Competition between three countries with large communities in London. Crowd: 7,438.
2004-06-02	Unity Cup	Charlton, The Valley Stadium	Jamaica	1–0	Kerr	Crowd: 6,155.
2004-06-05	Friendly	Amsterdam Arena	Netherlands	1–0	Kerr	
2004-08-18	Friendly	Dublin, Lansdowne Road	Bulgaria	1–1	Kerr	
2004-09-04	World Cup 2006 qualifier	Dublin, Lansdowne Road	Cyprus	3–0	Kerr	
2004-09-08	World Cup 2006 qualifier	Basel, St. Jakob Park	Switzerland	1–1	Kerr	
2004-10-09	World Cup 2006 qualifier	Saint-Denis, Stade de France	France	0–0	Kerr	
2004-10-13	World Cup 2006 qualifier	Dublin, Lansdowne Road	Faroe Islands	2–0	Kerr	Robbie Keane broke the Irish goal-scoring record with his 22nd national goal, the first of two he scored in this match.
2004-11-16	Friendly	Dublin, Lansdowne Road	Croatia	1–0	Kerr	
2005-02-09	Friendly	Dublin, Lansdowne Road	Portugal	1–0	Kerr	
2005-03-26	World Cup 2006 qualifier	Ramat Gan, Ramat Gan Stadium	Israel	1–1	Kerr	
2005-03-29	Friendly	Dublin, Lansdowne Road	China	1–0	Kerr	Crowd: 35,222.
2005-05-29	Friendly	Glasgow, Celtic Park	Celtic F.C.	1–0	Kerr	Unofficial match. Jackie McNamara testimonial. Crowd: 50,000.
2005-06-04	World Cup 2006 qualifier	Dublin, Lansdowne Road	Israel	2–2	Kerr	
2005-06-08	World Cup 2006 qualifier	Tórshavn, Tórsvøllur	Faroe Islands	2–0	Kerr	
2005-08-17	Friendly	Dublin, Lansdowne Road	Italy	1–2	Kerr	
2005-09-07	World Cup 2006 qualifier	Dublin, Lansdowne Road	France	0–1	Kerr	Roy Keane's final match for Ireland.
2005-10-08	World Cup 2006 qualifier	Nicosia, GSP Stadium	Cyprus	1–0	Kerr	
2005-10-12	World Cup 2006 qualifier	Dublin, Lansdowne Road	Switzerland	0–0	Kerr	
2006-03-01	Friendly	Dublin, Lansdowne Road	Sweden	3–0	Staunton	New manager: Steve Staunton.
2006-05-24	Friendly	Dublin, Lansdowne Road	Chile	0–1	Staunton	
2006-08-16	Friendly	Dublin, Lansdowne Road	Netherlands	0–4	Staunton	Worst home result since May 1966 (40 years).
2006-09-02	Euro 2008 qualifier	Stuttgart, Gottlieb-Daimler-Stadion	Germany	0–1	Staunton	
2006-10-07	Euro 2008 qualifier	Nicosia, GSP Stadium	Cyprus	2–5	Staunton	
2006-10-11	Euro 2008 qualifier	Dublin, Lansdowne Road	Czech Republic	1–1	Staunton	
2006-11-15	Euro 2008 qualifier	Dublin, Lansdowne Road	San Marino	5–0	Staunton	Robbie Keane hat-trick.
2007-02-07	Euro 2008 qualifier	Serravalle, Stadio Olimpico	San Marino	2–1	Staunton	
2007-03-24	Euro 2008 qualifier	Dublin, Croke Park	Wales	1–0	Staunton	First match in Croke Park. Crowd: 72,539.
2007-03-28	Euro 2008 qualifier	Dublin, Croke Park	Slovakia	1–0	Staunton	Shay Given captained team and equalled Packie Bonner's record of 80 caps.
2007-05-23	Friendly	East Rutherford NJ, Giants Stadium	Ecuador	1–1	Staunton	
2007-05-26	Friendly	Foxborough MA, Gillette Stadium	Bolivia	1–1	Staunton	
2007-08-22	Friendly	Aarhus, NRGi Park	Denmark	4–0	Staunton	
2007-09-08	Euro 2008 qualifier	Bratislava, Tehelné Pole Štadión	Slovakia	2–2	Staunton	
2007-09-12	Euro 2008 qualifier	Prague, AXA Arena	Czech Republic	0–1	Staunton	
2007-10-13	Euro 2008 qualifier	Dublin, Croke Park	Germany	0–0	Staunton	
2007-10-17	Euro 2008 qualifier	Dublin, Croke Park	Cyprus	1–1	Staunton	
2007-11-17	Euro 2008 qualifier	Cardiff, Millennium Stadium	Wales	2–2	Givens	Manager: Don Givens. Crowd: 24,619. Millennium Stadium one-third full.
2008-02-06	Friendly	Dublin, Croke Park	Brazil	0–1	Givens	
2008-05-18	Training match	Portimão	Portimonense	1–1	Trapattoni	New manager: Giovanni Trapattoni. Unofficial match. Training match only.
2008-05-19	Training match	Lagos	Esperança de Lagos	3–1	Trapattoni	Unofficial match. Training match only.
2008-05-24	Friendly	Dublin, Croke Park	Serbia	1–1	Trapattoni	
2008-05-29	Friendly	Fulham, Craven Cottage	Colombia	1–0	Trapattoni	
2008-08-20	Friendly	Oslo, Ullevaal Stadion	Norway	1–1	Trapattoni	
2008-09-06	World Cup 2010 qualifier	Mainz, Stadion am Bruchweg	Georgia	2–1	Trapattoni	Neutral venue in Germany owing to Russian invasion of Georgia. Crowd: 4,500.
2008-09-10	World Cup 2010 qualifier	Podgorica, Podgorica City Stadium	Montenegro	0–0	Trapattoni	Kevin Kilbane's 50th consecutive competitive game for Ireland. Crowd: 12,000.
2008-10-09	Friendly	Dublin, Dalymount Park	Nottingham Forest	2–0	Trapattoni	Unofficial match. Republic of Ireland XI. Crowd: 4,040.
2008-10-15	World Cup 2010 qualifier	Dublin, Croke Park	Cyprus	1–0	Trapattoni	Crowd: 55,833.
2008-11-19	Friendly	Dublin, Croke Park	Poland	2–3	Trapattoni	Crowd: 61,000.
2009-02-11	World Cup 2010 qualifier	Dublin, Croke Park	Georgia	2–1	Trapattoni	Crowd: 45,000.
2009-03-28	World Cup 2010 qualifier	Dublin, Croke Park	Bulgaria	1–1	Trapattoni	Crowd: 61,002.
2009-04-01	World Cup 2010 qualifier	Bari, Stadio San Nicola	Italy	1–1	Trapattoni	Crowd: 48,000.
2009-05-29	Friendly	Fulham, Craven Cottage	Nigeria	1–1	Trapattoni	Crowd: 11,263.
2009-06-06	World Cup 2010 qualifier	Sofia, Vasil Levski National Stadium	Bulgaria	1–1	Trapattoni	Crowd: 42,000.
2009-08-12	Friendly	Limerick, Thomond Park	Australia	0–3	Trapattoni	Re-built Thomond Park has a capacity of 26,000. Crowd: 19,428.
2009-09-05	World Cup 2010 qualifier	Nicosia, GSP Stadium	Cyprus	2–1	Trapattoni	
2009-09-08	Friendly	Limerick, Thomond Park	South Africa	1–0	Trapattoni	Darren O'Dea debut. Crowd: 11,300.
2009-10-10	World Cup 2010 qualifier	Dublin, Croke Park	Italy	2–2	Trapattoni	Crowd: 70,640.
2009-10-14	World Cup 2010 qualifier	Dublin, Croke Park	Montenegro	0–0	Trapattoni	
2009-11-14	World Cup 2010 play-off	Dublin, Croke Park	France	0–1	Trapattoni	Final match played at Croke Park. Highest domestic attendance: 74,103.
2009-11-18	World Cup 2010 play-off	Saint-Denis, Stade de France	France	1–1	Trapattoni	Match featured Thierry Henry handball incident. Crowd: 79,145.
2010-03-02	Friendly	Holloway, Emirates Stadium	Brazil	0–2	Trapattoni	
2010-05-25	Friendly	Dublin, RDS Arena	Paraguay	2–1	Trapattoni	Crowd 16,722.
2010-05-29	Friendly	Dublin, RDS Arena	Algeria	3–0	Trapattoni	
2010-08-11	Friendly	Dublin, Lansdowne Road	Argentina	0–1	Trapattoni	Crowd: 45,200.
2010-09-03	Euro 2012 qualifier	Yerevan, Hanrapetakan Stadium	Armenia	1–0	Trapattoni	Crowd: 8,862.
2010-09-07	Euro 2012 qualifier	Dublin, Lansdowne Road	Andorra	3–1	Trapattoni	Crowd: 40,283.
2010-10-08	Euro 2012 qualifier	Dublin, Lansdowne Road	Russia	2–3	Trapattoni	Crowd: 50,411.
2010-10-12	Euro 2012 qualifier	Žilina, Štadión pod Dubňom	Slovakia	1–1	Trapattoni	Crowd: 10,892.
2010-11-17	Friendly	Dublin, Lansdowne Road	Norway	1–2	Trapattoni	Crowd: 25,000.
2011-02-08	Nations Cup	Dublin, Lansdowne Road	Wales	3–0	Trapattoni	Friendly. Ireland hosted and won the tournament. Crowd: 19,783.
2011-03-26	Euro 2012 qualifier	Dublin, Lansdowne Road	Macedonia	2–1	Trapattoni	Crowd: 32,000.
2011-03-29	Friendly	Dublin, Lansdowne Road	Uruguay	2–3	Trapattoni	Crowd: 25,611.
2011-05-24	Nations Cup	Dublin, Lansdowne Road	Northern Ireland	5–0	Trapattoni	Friendly. Crowd: 15,083.
2011-05-29	Nations Cup	Dublin, Lansdowne Road	Scotland	1–0	Trapattoni	Friendly. Crowd: 17,694.
2011-06-04	Euro 2012 qualifier	Skopje, Philip II Arena	Macedonia	2–0	Trapattoni	Robbie Keane's 50th and 51st international goals. Crowd: 30,000.
2011-06-07	Friendly	Liège, Stade Maurice Dufrasne	Italy	2–0	Trapattoni	World Champions defeated by Irish B team. Crowd: 21,516.
2011-08-10	Friendly	Dublin, Lansdowne Road	Croatia	0–0	Trapattoni	
2011-09-02	Euro 2012 qualifier	Dublin, Lansdowne Road	Slovakia	0–0	Trapattoni	Crowd: 38,000.
2011-09-06	Euro 2012 qualifier	Moscow, Luzhniki Stadium	Russia	0–0	Trapattoni	Crowd: 48,717.
2011-10-07	Euro 2012 qualifier	Andorra la Vella, Estadi Comunal	Andorra	2–0	Trapattoni	Eighth consecutive clean sheet, a national record.
2011-10-11	Euro 2012 qualifier	Dublin, Lansdowne Road	Armenia	2–1	Trapattoni	Sent off: Armenian goalkeeper Roman Berezovsky and Irish striker Kevin Doyle.
2011-11-11	Euro 2012 play-off	Tallinn, Lilleküla Stadium	Estonia	4–0	Trapattoni	Two Estonians sent off. Two goals by Robbie Keane.
2011-11-15	Euro 2012 play-off	Dublin, Lansdowne Road	Estonia	1–1	Trapattoni	Ireland qualified for Euro 2012 tournament. Crowd: 51,151.
2012-02-29	Friendly	Dublin, Lansdowne Road	Czech Republic	1–1	Trapattoni	Crowd: 37,741.
2012-05-26	Friendly	Dublin, Lansdowne Road	Bosnia and Herzegovina	1–0	Trapattoni	Crowd: 37,100.
2012-05-29	Friendly	Pistoia, Stadio Marcello Melani	Tuscan Select XI	5–0	Trapattoni	Unofficial match. Tuscan XI was a Serie C and D side assembled by E. Pellegrini and A. Firicano.
2012-06-04	Friendly	Budapest, Puskás Ferenc Stadion	Hungary	0–0	Trapattoni	Ireland unbeaten in 14 matches. Match delayed 20 minutes by thunderstorm.
2012-06-10	Euro 2012	Poznań, Stadion Miejski	Croatia	1–3	Trapattoni	Ireland's first match at a major tournament since World Cup 2002. Croatia was the first team ever to score in the first five minutes of each half at the European Championships. Crowd: 39,550.
2012-06-14	Euro 2012	Gdańsk, PGE Arena	Spain	0–4	Trapattoni	Ireland were the first team to be eliminated from Euro 2012. Spain was the second team ever to score in the first five minutes of each half at the European Championships. Spain performed 859 passes, a Euro match record (previously 778). Xavi and Xabi Alonso each performed more passes by half-time than the whole Irish team. Crowd: 39,150.
2012-06-18	Euro 2012	Poznań, Stadion Miejski	Italy	0–2	Trapattoni	Damien Duff captained the team for his 100th and final international match.
2012-08-15	Friendly	Belgrade, Red Star Stadium	Serbia	0–0	Trapattoni	Keiren Westwood in goal. Crowd: 7,800.
2012-09-07	World Cup 2014 qualifier	Astana, Astana Arena	Kazakhstan	2–1	Trapattoni	Crowd: 9,500. First match against Kazakhstan.
2012-09-11	Friendly	Fulham, Craven Cottage	Oman	4–1	Trapattoni	Crowd: 6,420. First match against Oman.
2012-10-12	World Cup 2014 qualifier	Dublin, Lansdowne Road	Germany	1–6	Trapattoni	Ireland's worst home defeat. Crowd: 51,700.
2012-10-16	World Cup 2014 qualifier	Tórshavn, Tórsvøllur	Faroe Islands	4–1	Trapattoni	Crowd: 4,400.
2012-11-14	Friendly	Dublin, Lansdowne Road	Greece	0–1	Trapattoni	Crowd: 16,256. David Forde in goal.
2013-02-06	Friendly	Dublin, Lansdowne Road	Poland	2–0	Trapattoni	Crowd: 43,112.
2013-03-22	World Cup 2014 qualifier	Solna, Friends Arena	Sweden	0–0	Trapattoni	Crowd: 49,436.
2013-03-26	World Cup 2014 qualifier	Dublin, Lansdowne Road	Austria	2–2	Trapattoni	Crowd: 50,000.
2013-05-29	Friendly	London, Wembley Stadium	England	1–1	Trapattoni	Crowd: 80,126. Part of the English FA's 150th anniversary celebrations.
2013-06-02	Friendly	Dublin, Lansdowne Road	Georgia	4–0	Trapattoni	Georgian goalkeeper Giorgi Loria sent off (20').
2013-06-07	World Cup 2014 qualifier	Dublin, Lansdowne Road	Faroe Islands	3–0	Trapattoni	Robbie Keane won his 126th cap, an Irish record, and scored a hat trick. Crowd: 19,000.
2013-06-11	Friendly	New York, Yankee Stadium	Spain	0–2	Trapattoni	Crowd: 39,368.
2013-08-14	Friendly	Cardiff, Cardiff City Stadium	Wales	0–0	Trapattoni	Crowd: 20,000.
2013-09-06	World Cup 2014 qualifier	Dublin, Lansdowne Road	Sweden	1–2	Trapattoni	Crowd: 49,500.
2013-09-10	World Cup 2014 qualifier	Vienna, Ernst-Happel-Stadion	Austria	0–1	Trapattoni	Crowd: 48,545.
2013-10-11	World Cup 2014 qualifier	Cologne, RheinEnergieStadion	Germany	0–3	King	500th official match. Manager: Noel King. Crowd: 46,237.
2013-10-15	World Cup 2014 qualifier	Dublin, Lansdowne Road	Kazakhstan	3–1	King	Crowd: 15,000.
2013-11-15	Friendly	Dublin, Lansdowne Road	Latvia	3–0	O'Neill	New manager: Martin O'Neill. Crowd: 37,100.
2013-11-19	Friendly	Poznań, Stadion Miejski	Poland	0–0	O'Neill	Crowd: 3,500.
2014-03-05	Friendly	Dublin, Lansdowne Road	Serbia	1–2	O'Neill	Crowd: 37,595.
2014-05-25	Friendly	Dublin, Lansdowne Road	Turkey	1–2	O'Neill	Crowd: 25,191.
2014-05-31	Friendly	Fulham, Craven Cottage	Italy	0–0	O'Neill	Crowd: 22,879.
2014-06-07	Friendly	Chester, PA, PPL Park	Costa Rica	1–1	O'Neill	Crowd: 6,000. Giancarlo González sent off at 41 minutes after injuring Kevin Doyle.
2014-06-10	Friendly	East Rutherford NJ, MetLife Stadium	Portugal	1–5	O'Neill	Crowd: 46,063. Portugal Day, the national day in Portugal.
2014-09-03	Friendly	Dublin, Lansdowne Road	Oman	2–0	O'Neill	Crowd: 14,376.
2014-09-07	Euro 2016 qualifier	Tbilisi, Boris Paichadze Dinamo Arena	Georgia	2–1	O'Neill	Brace by Aiden McGeady.
2014-10-11	Euro 2016 qualifier	Dublin, Lansdowne Road	Gibraltar	7–0	O'Neill	First match against Gibraltar. Hat trick by Robbie Keane; brace by James McClean.
2014-10-14	Euro 2016 qualifier	Gelsenkirchen, Veltins-Arena	Germany	1–1	O'Neill	Ireland equalized in the last minute of injury time.
2014-11-14	Euro 2016 qualifier	Glasgow, Celtic Park	Scotland	0–1	O'Neill	
2014-11-18	Friendly	Dublin, Lansdowne Road	United States	4–1	O'Neill	
2015-03-29	Euro 2016 qualifier	Dublin, Lansdowne Road	Poland	1–1	O'Neill	Crowd: 50,000.
2015-06-04	Training match	Dublin, Lansdowne Road	Northern Ireland	0–0	O'Neill	Crowd: 50. Training match behind closed doors.
2015-06-07	Friendly	Dublin, Lansdowne Road	England	0–0	O'Neill	First home match against England since the Lansdowne Road football riot 20 years before.
2015-06-13	Euro 2016 qualifier	Dublin, Lansdowne Road	Scotland	1–1	O'Neill	
2015-09-04	Euro 2016 qualifier	Faro, Estádio Algarve	Gibraltar	4–0	O'Neill	
2015-09-07	Euro 2016 qualifier	Dublin, Lansdowne Road	Georgia	1–0	O'Neill	Crowd: 27,000.
2015-10-08	Euro 2016 qualifier	Dublin, Lansdowne Road	Germany	1–0	O'Neill	First competitive victory over the reigning World Champions. Crowd: 50,064.
2015-10-11	Euro 2016 qualifier	Warsaw, National Stadium	Poland	1–2	O'Neill	
2015-11-13	Euro 2016 play-off	Zenica, Bilino Polje Stadium	Bosnia and Herzegovina	1–1	O'Neill	
2015-11-16	Euro 2016 play-off	Dublin, Lansdowne Road	Bosnia and Herzegovina	2–0	O'Neill	Brace by Jonathan Walters.
2016-03-25	Friendly	Dublin, Lansdowne Road	Switzerland	1–0	O'Neill	
2016-03-29	Friendly	Dublin, Lansdowne Road	Slovakia	2–2	O'Neill	
2016-05-27	Friendly	Dublin, Lansdowne Road	Netherlands	1–1	O'Neill	
2016-05-31	Friendly	Cork, Turners Cross	Belarus	1–2	O'Neill	
2016-06-13	Euro 2016	Saint-Denis, Stade de France	Sweden	1–1	O'Neill	
2016-06-18	Euro 2016	Bordeaux, Nouveau Stade de Bordeaux	Belgium	0–3	O'Neill	
2016-06-22	Euro 2016	Lille, Stade Pierre-Mauroy	Italy	1–0	O'Neill	
2016-06-26	Euro 2016	Lyon, Parc Olympique Lyonnais	France	1–2	O'Neill	
2016-08-31	Friendly	Dublin, Lansdowne Road	Oman	4–0	O'Neill	
2016-09-05	World Cup 2018 qualifier	Belgrade, Rajko Mitić Stadium	Serbia	2–2	O'Neill	
2016-10-06	World Cup 2018 qualifier	Dublin, Lansdowne Road	Georgia	1–0	O'Neill	
2016-10-09	World Cup 2018 qualifier	Chișinău, Zimbru Stadium	Moldova	3–1	O'Neill	
2016-11-12	World Cup 2018 qualifier	Vienna, Ernst-Happel-Stadion	Austria	1–0	O'Neill	
2017-03-24	World Cup 2018 qualifier	Dublin, Lansdowne Road	Wales	0–0	O'Neill	
2017-03-28	Friendly	Dublin, Lansdowne Road	Iceland	0–1	O'Neill	
2017-06-01	Friendly	East Rutherford NJ, MetLife Stadium	Mexico	1–3	O'Neill	
2017-06-04	Friendly	Dublin, Lansdowne Road	Uruguay	3–1	O'Neill	
2017-06-11	World Cup 2018 qualifier	Dublin, Lansdowne Road	Austria	1–1	O'Neill	
2017-09-02	World Cup 2018 qualifier	Tbilisi, Boris Paichadze Dinamo Arena	Georgia	1–1	O'Neill	
2017-09-05	World Cup 2018 qualifier	Dublin, Lansdowne Road	Serbia	0–1	O'Neill	
2017-10-06	World Cup 2018 qualifier	Dublin, Lansdowne Road	Moldova	2–0	O'Neill	
2017-10-09	World Cup 2018 qualifier	Cardiff, Cardiff City Stadium	Wales	1–0	O'Neill	
2017-11-11	World Cup 2018 play-off	Copenhagen, Telia Parken	Denmark	0–0	O'Neill	
2017-11-14	World Cup 2018 play-off	Dublin, Lansdowne Road	Denmark	1–5	O'Neill	
2018-03-23	Friendly	Antalya, New Antalya Stadium	Turkey	0–1	O'Neill	Matt Doherty and Scott Hogan debut.
2018-05-21	Testimonial	Glasgow, Celtic Park	Celtic F.C.	2–2	O'Neill	Testimonial for Scott Brown.
2018-05-28	Friendly	St Denis, Stade de France	France	0–2	O'Neill	
2018-06-02	Friendly	Dublin, Lansdowne Road	United States	2–1	O'Neill	
2018-09-06	UEFA Nations League	Cardiff, Cardiff City Stadium	Wales	1–4	O'Neill	
2018-09-11	Friendly	Wrocław, Stadion Miejski	Poland	1–1	O'Neill	
2018-10-13	UEFA Nations League	Dublin, Lansdowne Road	Denmark	0–0	O'Neill	
2018-10-16	UEFA Nations League	Dublin, Lansdowne Road	Wales	0–1	O'Neill	
2018-11-15	Friendly	Dublin, Lansdowne Road	Northern Ireland	0–0	O'Neill	
2018-11-19	UEFA Nations League	Aarhus, Ceres Park	Denmark	0–0	O'Neill	
2019-03-23	Euro 2020 Qualifier	Gibraltar, Victoria Stadium	Gibraltar	1–0	McCarthy	First game of Mick McCarthy's second term as Ireland manager
2019-03-26	Euro 2020 Qualifier	Dublin, Lansdowne Road	Georgia	1–0	McCarthy	
2019-06-07	Euro 2020 Qualifier	Copenhagen, Telia Parken	Denmark	1–1	McCarthy	
2019-06-10	Euro 2020 Qualifier	Dublin, Lansdowne Road	Gibraltar	2–0	McCarthy	
2019-09-05	Euro 2020 Qualifier	Dublin, Lansdowne Road	Switzerland	1–1	McCarthy	
2019-09-10	Friendly	Dublin, Lansdowne Road	Bulgaria	3–1	McCarthy	
2019-10-12	Euro 2020 Qualifier	Tbilisi, Boris Paichadze Dinamo Arena	Georgia	0–0	McCarthy	
2019-10-15	Euro 2020 Qualifier	Geneva, Stade de Genève	Switzerland	0–2	McCarthy	
2019-11-14	Friendly	Dublin, Lansdowne Road	New Zealand	3–1	McCarthy	First ever senior international between Ireland and New Zealand
2019-11-18	Euro 2020 Qualifier	Dublin, Lansdowne Road	Denmark	1–1	McCarthy	
2020-09-03	UEFA Nations League	Sofia, Vasil Levski National Stadium	Bulgaria	1–1	Kenny	First game with Stephen Kenny as manager
2020-09-06	UEFA Nations League	Dublin, Lansdowne Road	Finland	0–1	Kenny	
2020-10-08	Euro 2020 Qualifier	Bratislava, Tehelné pole	Slovakia	2–4	Kenny	AET:0-0 PSO:Ireland 2-4 Slovakia
2020-10-11	UEFA Nations League	Dublin, Lansdowne Road	Wales	0–0	Kenny	
2020-10-14	UEFA Nations League	Helsinki, Helsinki Olympic Stadium	Finland	0–1	Kenny	
2020-11-12	Friendly	London, Wembley Stadium	England	0–3	Kenny	
2020-11-15	UEFA Nations League	Cardiff, Cardiff City Stadium	Wales	0–1	Kenny	
2020-11-18	UEFA Nations League	Dublin, Lansdowne Road	Bulgaria	0–0	Kenny	
2021-03-24	World Cup 2022 qualifier	Belgrade, Red Star Stadium	Serbia	2–3	Kenny	
2021-03-27	World Cup 2022 qualifier	Dublin, Lansdowne Road	Luxembourg	0–1	Kenny	Second lowest fifa ranked team that Ireland have lost to
2021-03-30	Friendly	Debrecen, Nagyerdei Stadion	Qatar	1–1	Kenny	
2021-06-03	Friendly	Andorra la Vella, Estadi Nacional	Andorra	4–1	Kenny	
2021-06-08	Friendly	Budapest, Ferenc Szusza Stadium	Hungary	0–0	Kenny	
2021-09-01	World Cup 2022 qualifier	Algarve, Estádio Algarve	Portugal	1–2	Kenny	
2021-09-04	World Cup 2022 qualifier	Dublin, Aviva Stadium	Azerbaijan	1–1	Kenny	
2021-09-07	World Cup 2022 qualifier	Dublin, Aviva Stadium	Serbia	1–1	Kenny	
2021-10-09	World Cup 2022 qualifier	Baku, Baku Olympic Stadium	Azerbaijan	3–0	Kenny	
2021-10-12	Friendly	Dublin, Aviva Stadium	Qatar	4–0	Kenny	Hat-trick by Callum Robinson, first by Ireland (Robbie Keane) since 2014.
2021-11-11	World Cup 2022 qualifier	Dublin, Aviva Stadium	Portugal	0–0	Kenny	
2021-11-14	World Cup 2022 qualifier	Luxembourg, Stade de Luxembourg	Luxembourg	3–0	Kenny	
2022-03-26	Friendly	Dublin, Aviva Stadium	Belgium	2–2	Kenny	
2022-03-29	Friendly	Dublin, Aviva Stadium	Lithuania	1–0	Kenny	
2022-06-04	2022–23 UEFA Nations League	Yerevan, Sargsyan Stadium	Armenia	0–1	Kenny	Goal: Eduard Spertsyan
2022-06-08	2022–23 UEFA Nations League	Dublin, Aviva Stadium	Ukraine	0–1	Kenny	Goal: Viktor Tsyhankov (47')
2022-06-11	2022–23 UEFA Nations League	Dublin, Aviva Stadium	Scotland	3–0	Kenny	
2022-06-14	2022–23 UEFA Nations League	Łódź, Stadion Miejski	Ukraine	1–1	Kenny	
2022-09-24	2022–23 UEFA Nations League	Glasgow, Hampden Park	Scotland	1–2	Kenny	
2022-09-27	2022–23 UEFA Nations League	Dublin, Aviva Stadium	Armenia	3–2	Kenny	
2022-11-17	Friendly	Dublin, Aviva Stadium	Norway	1–2	Kenny	
2022-11-20	Friendly	Ta' Qali, National Stadium, Ta' Qali	Malta	1–0	Kenny	
2023-03-22	Friendly	Dublin, Aviva Stadium	Latvia	3–2	Kenny	
2023-03-27	Euro 2024 qualifier	Dublin, Aviva Stadium	France	0–1	Kenny	
2023-06-16	Euro 2024 qualifier	Agia Sophia Stadium, Athens	Greece	1–2	Kenny	
2023-06-19	Euro 2024 qualifier	Dublin, Aviva Stadium	Gibraltar	3–0	Kenny	
2023-09-07	Euro 2024 qualifier	Paris, Parc des Princes	France	0–2	Kenny	
2023-09-20	Euro 2024 qualifier	Dublin, Aviva Stadium	Netherlands	1–2	Kenny	
2023-10-13	Euro 2024 qualifier	Dublin, Aviva Stadium	Greece	0–2	Kenny	
2023-10-16	Euro 2024 qualifier	Algarve, Estádio Algarve	Gibraltar	4–0	Kenny	
2023-11-18	Euro 2024 qualifier	Amsterdam, Johan Cruyff Arena	Netherlands	0–1	Kenny	
2023-11-21	Friendly	Dublin, Aviva Stadium	New Zealand	1–1	Kenny	
2024-03-23	Friendly	Dublin, Aviva Stadium	Belgium	0–0	O'Shea	First game with John O'Shea as interim manager
2024-03-26	Friendly	Dublin, Aviva Stadium	Switzerland	0–1	O'Shea	
2024-06-04	Friendly	Dublin, Aviva Stadium	Hungary	2–1	O'Shea	
2024-06-11	Friendly	Aveiro, Estádio Municipal de Aveiro	Portugal	0–3	O'Shea	
2024-09-07	2024–25 UEFA Nations League	Dublin, Aviva Stadium	England	0–2	Hallgrímsson	First game with Heimir Hallgrímsson as manager
2024-09-10	2024–25 UEFA Nations League	Dublin, Aviva Stadium	Greece	0–2	Hallgrímsson	
2024-10-10	2024–25 UEFA Nations League	Helsinki, Helsinki Olympic Stadium	Finland	2–1	Hallgrímsson	
2024-10-13	2024–25 UEFA Nations League	Piraeus, Karaiskakis Stadium	Greece	0–2	Hallgrímsson	
2024-11-14	2024–25 UEFA Nations League	Dublin, Aviva Stadium	Finland	1–0	Hallgrímsson	
2024-11-17	2024–25 UEFA Nations League	London, Wembley Stadium	England	0–5	Hallgrímsson	
2025-03-20	2024–25 UEFA Nations League	Plovdiv, Stadion Hristo Botev	Bulgaria	2–1	Hallgrímsson	Play-off match.
2025-03-23	2024–25 UEFA Nations League	Dublin, Aviva Stadium	Bulgaria	2–1	Hallgrímsson	Play-off match.
2025-06-06	Friendly	Dublin, Aviva Stadium	Senegal	1–1	Hallgrímsson	
2025-06-10	Friendly	Luxembourg City, Stade de Luxembourg	Luxembourg	0–0	Hallgrímsson	
2025-09-06	2026 World Cup qualifier	Dublin, Aviva Stadium	Hungary	2–2	Hallgrímsson	
2025-09-09	2026 World Cup qualifier	Yerevan, Vazgen Sargsyan Republican Stadium	Armenia	1–2	Hallgrímsson	
2025-10-11	2026 World Cup qualifier	Lisbon, Estádio José Alvalade	Portugal	0–1	Hallgrímsson	
2025-10-14	2026 World Cup qualifier	Dublin, Aviva Stadium	Armenia	1–0	Hallgrímsson	
2025-11-13	2026 World Cup qualifier	Dublin, Aviva Stadium	Portugal	2–0	Hallgrímsson	Troy Parrott scored a brace.
2025-11-16	2026 World Cup qualifier	Budapest, Puskás Aréna	Hungary	3–2	Hallgrímsson	Troy Parrott scored a hat-trick.
2026-03-26	2026 World Cup play-off	Fortuna Arena, Prague	Czechia	3 – 4	Hallgrímsson	After extra time: 2–2; Czechia won 4–3 on penalties
2026-03-31	International Friendly	Aviva Stadium, Dublin	North Macedonia	0 – 0	Hallgrímsson	
2026-05-16	International Friendly	Estadio Enrique Roca, Murcia	Grenada	5-0	Hallgrímsson	
2026-05-28	International Friendly	Aviva Stadium, Dublin	Qatar	1-0	Hallgrímsson	
2026-06-06	International Friendly	Saputo Stadium, Montreal	Canada	1-1	Hallgrímsson	
2026-09-24	2026-27 UEFA Nations League	Stadiumi Vadil Vokrri, Pristina	Kosovo	0-1	Hallgrímsson	
2026-09-27	2026-27 UEFA Nations League	Nagyerdei Stadion, Debrecen	Israel	3-0	Hallgrímsson	
2026-01-10	2026-27 UEFA Nations League	Aviva Stadium, Dublin	Austria	2-2	Hallgrímsson	
2026-04-10	2026-27 UEFA Nations League	TSC Arena, Backa Topola, Serbia	Israel	1-1	Hallgrímsson	
2026-11-14	2026-27 UEFA Nations League	Raffeisen Arena, Linz	Austria	0-1	Hallgrímsson	
2026-11-17	2026-27 UEFA Nations League	Aviva Stadium, Dublin	Kosovo	3-0	Hallgrímsson	
