= 1925–26 FAI Cup =

FAI Cup

Tournament details
- Country: Republic of Ireland

Final positions
- Champions: Fordsons (1st title)

Tournament statistics
- Matches played: 16
- Goals scored: 62 (3.88 per match)

The FAI Cup 1925-26^{[A]} was the fifth edition of Ireland's premier cup competition, The Football Association of Ireland Challenge Cup or FAI Cup. The tournament began on 9 January 1926 and concluded on 17 March with the final held at Dalymount Park, Dublin. An official attendance^{[B]} of 25,000^{[C]} people watched inspirational goalkeeper Bill O'Hagan guide Fordsons to their first and only FAI Cup title by defeating the defending champions Shamrock Rovers.

== First round ==
Tie no	Home team	Score	Away team	Date
1	Athlone Town	4-0	Brideville	9 January 1926
2	Bohemians	0-0	Shamrock Rovers	9 January 1926
replay	Shamrock Rovers	2-2	Bohemians	16 January 1926
replay(2)	Shamrock Rovers	2-0	Bohemians	20 January 1926
3	Bray Unknowns	5-2	St James's Gate	9 January 1926
4	Fordsons	2-2	Shelbourne	9 January 1926
replay	Shelbourne	1-2	Fordsons	16 January 1926
5	Lindon	4-2	Pioneers	9 January 1926
6	Jacobs	5-1	Barrackton United	10 January 1926

== Second round ==
Tie no	Home team	Score	Away team	Date
1	Lindon	1-1	Jacobs	23 January 1926
replay	Jacobs	4-2	Lindon	31 January 1926
2	Athlone Town	2-3	Fordsons	24 January 1926

Bye	Bray Unknowns
Bye	Shamrock Rovers

== Semi-finals ==
6 February, 1926

Shamrock Rovers	0–0	Jacobs

Shelbourne Park, Dublin

21 February, 1926

Fordsons	4–1	Bray Unknowns
Buckle; Kelly; Sullivan(2)

Victoria Cross, Cork

=== Replay ===
20 February, 1926

Shamrock Rovers	3–0	Jacobs
Jordan; Fullam; Flood

Dalymount Park, Dublin

== Final ==
17 March, 1926

Fordsons	3–2	Shamrock Rovers
Barry(2); Roberts		Farrell; Fagan

Dalymount Park, Dublin
Attendance: 25,000

Winner of FAI Cup 1925–26
Fordsons
1st Title

== Notes ==
A. From 1923 to 1936, the FAI Cup was known as the Free State Cup.

B. Attendances were calculated using gate receipts which limited their accuracy as a large proportion of people, particularly children, attended football matches in Ireland throughout the 20th century for free by a number of means. However, in the instances of capacity crowds attending, this practice might not have been as common as usual or have had as large an effect on actual attendances.

C. The official attendance of 25,000 was a record for the first five FAI Cup finals and the joint highest official attendance for the first ten.
