= Jimmy White (Irish footballer) =

Irish footballer

Personal information
- Place of birth: Ireland

Senior career*
Years	Team	Apps	(Gls)
1923-1930s	Bohemians	157	(69)

International career
1928	Ireland		(2)
- * Club domestic league appearances and goals

Jimmy White was an Irish footballer who played as a forward during the 1920s and 1930s.

== Bohemians ==
White was a number 9 during this era in the League of Ireland and spent most of his career with Bohemians whom he joined in 1923. White made his way up from Bohs "C" team to make his debut in August 1926 against Fordsons. True to form, it was a scoring debut as he netted in a 2–1 win for Bohs.

He was part of the All-Conquering Bohemian team of 1927–28 who won every trophy on offer that season - League of Ireland, FAI Cup, League of Ireland Shield and Leinster Senior Cup. He scored 11 goals in 15 league games that season and a total of 24 strikes in 29 appearances in all competitions. White also scored in that season's FAI Cup Final on St. Patrick's Day as Bohs beat Drumcondra 2–1 at Dalymount Park. In 1931–32 season, White was given the honour of club captain.

White scored 69 goals in 157 competitive appearances for Bohs and is currently fifth on their all-time FAI Cup goalscoring list with 13 goals in that competition. After he retired from football, he stayed involved with Bohs and served on their Management Committee from 1945 to 1948, 1949–60, 1961–64 and had a spell as Assistant Honorary Treasurer from 1964 to 1969.

== International career ==
White won full international caps for Ireland and scored twice in their win against Belgium in February 1928. This side also included Bohemian colleague Harry Cannon, Jack McCarthy and Jeremiah Robinson.
