= Jack McCarthy (Irish footballer) =

Irish footballer (1898–1958)

Personal information
- Full name: John Joseph McCarthy
- Date of birth: 29 March 1898
- Place of birth: London, England
- Date of death: 10 March 1958 (aged 59)
- Place of death: Dublin, Ireland
- Position: Defender

Senior career*
Years	Team	Apps	(Gls)
- Olympia
- Bohemians

International career
1921	Ireland Amateurs (IFA)		
1924	League of Ireland XI	1	(0)
1924–1930	Irish Free State (FAI)	6	(0)
- * Club domestic league appearances and goals

Jack McCarthy (29 March 1898 – 10 March 1958) was an Irish footballer who played for Bohemians in the League of Ireland during the 1920s and 1930s. As an international McCarthy also represented both Ireland teams. He played as a senior for the FAI XI and as an amateur for the IFA XI. He remained an amateur player throughout his career.

== Bohemians ==
During the 1923–24 season, McCarthy helped Bohemians win their first ever League of Ireland title. Bohs won the title after winning 15 successive league games. Other members of the team included Bertie Kerr, Johnny McIlroy, Billy Otto, Christy Robinson, Dave Roberts and Johnny Murray. On 23 February 1924 McCarthy also played for a League of Ireland XI in a prestige friendly against Celtic. 22,000 turned up at Dalymount Park to see Celtic win 3–0. The game was used by the FAI to raise funds to help send a squad, which included McCarthy, to the 1924 Olympic Games. Together with Peter Kavanagh, Harry Cannon, Jimmy White, Jimmy Bermingham, Jeremiah Robinson and Christy Robinson, McCarthy was also a prominent member of the 1927–28 Bohs team which won a quartet of trophies including the League of Ireland title, the FAI Cup, the League of Ireland Shield and the Leinster Senior Cup.

His brother Stephen was an ace goalscorer for Bohemians during this period. while his son (also named Jack) represented Bohs during the 1952/53 season.

== Irish international ==
When McCarthy played international football during the 1920s, there were in effect, two Ireland teams, chosen by two rival associations. Both associations, the Northern Ireland - based IFA and the Irish Free State - based FAI claimed jurisdiction over the whole of Ireland and selected players from the whole island. As a result, several notable Irish players from this era, including McCarthy played for both teams.

=== IFA XI ===
McCarthy played at least one game for the IFA Amateur XI. In 1921 he played against France in Paris.

=== FAI XI ===
Between 1924 and 1930 McCarthy made 6 appearances for the FAI XI. The first two of these games were played at the 1924 Olympic Games. Other members of the Olympic squad included Tommy Muldoon, Joe Kendrick, Paddy Duncan, Johnny Murray and Dinny Hannon. He made his debut for the FAI XI in their first ever senior international on 28 May 1924, a 1–0 win at the Stade Olympique against Bulgaria. As a result of this win the FAI XI qualified for the quarter-finals. On 2 June McCarthy also played in this game against the Netherlands but the FAI XI lost 2-1 after extra-time. The following day he played for the FAI XI in a 3–1 win against Estonia in a friendly at the Stade Olympique . On 21 March 1926 he also played in a 3–0 away defeat against Italy. His last two appearances for the FAI XI were both in away friendlies against Belgium. On 12 February 1928 he captained the team when they won 4-2 and on 11 May 1930 he helped them to a win 3–1.

== Honours ==
- League of Ireland: 3
  - 1923–24, 1927–28, 1929–30
- FAI Cup: 1
  - 1928
- League of Ireland Shield: 2
  - 1928, 1929
