= John Joe Flood =

Irish footballer (1898–1982)

Personal information
- Date of birth: 2 August 1899
- Place of birth: Ringsend, Dublin, Ireland
- Date of death: 3 July 1982 (aged 82)
- Height: 5 ft 8 in (1.73 m)
- Position: Forward

Senior career*
Years	Team	Apps	(Gls)
1922–1923	Shamrock Rovers		
1923–1924	Shelbourne		
1923–1924	Shamrock Rovers		
1923–1924	Leeds United		
1924–1925	Shamrock Rovers		(4)
1926–1928	Crystal Palace	34	(5)
1928–1934	Shamrock Rovers		
1934–1935	Reds United F.C.		

International career
1926–1931	Irish Free State	5	(4)
1925–1932	League of Ireland XI	8	(3)
- * Club domestic league appearances and goals

John Joe Flood (2 August 1899 – 3 July 1982), also referred to as Jonjo Flood or John Flood, was an Irish footballer who played as a forward for Shelbourne, Shamrock Rovers, Leeds United and Crystal Palace. As an international, he also played for and captained the Irish Free State yielding a return of 4 goals in 5 games. Flood was also part of the League of Ireland XI setup (1925–1933) which was viewed by fans of the day as an international team when playing against the likes of the Scottish/Welsh/IFA League XI sides. He played eight times and scored 3 goals.

== Club career ==
Flood play for Shelbourne before joining Shamrock Rovers. After helping Rovers win their first ever League of Ireland title in 1923 he joined Leeds United, together with Bob Fullam. However neither of them managed to establish themselves at United and they both rejoined Rovers for the following season. Back with Rovers, together with Fullam, John Fagan and Billy Farrell he was an integral part of a legendary forward-line known as the Four F's. During the 1924–25 season they helped Rovers win a League of Ireland / League of Ireland Shield / FAI Cup treble. They won the FAI Cup after beating Shelbourne 2–1 at Dalymount Park before an attendance of 25,000. Flood and Fullam scored the two goals against their former club. During his career Flood also had a spell with Crystal Palace. In April 1932 he was awarded a benefit game which broke all previous attendance records and signified the impact that the popular Flood had on the game in the country at the time.

== International career ==
Between 1926 and 1931 Flood made five appearances and scored four goals for the Irish Free State. He made his international debut in a 3–0 away defeat against Italy on 21 March 1926. This was a controversial fixture as Britain had not yet view Ireland as a sovereign state but Italy, another Catholic nation, decided to give the Irish that recognition much to the ire of Westminster. The team brought their own tri color to be flown at the fixture along with the sheet music to 'The Soldier's Song'/'Amhrán na bhFiann' for the band to play. Flood won his second cap on 20 April 1929 against Belgium at Dalymount Park. He marked the occasion by scoring Irelands' first international hat-trick and the Irish won 4–0. He scored his fourth international goal in a return game against Belgium on 11 May 1930. Jimmy Dunne scored the other two goals as the Irish won 3–1. On 26 April 1931, he captained the Irish Free State against Spain. Together with Tom Farquharson, Peter Kavanagh and Paddy Moore he was part of a team that gained a respectable 1–1 draw at the Montjuic Stadium in Barcelona. Flood laid on the pass for Moore to score on his debut. He made his last international appearance on 13 December 1931 in the return game against Spain which the Irish Free State lost 5–0. Flood captained the Irish team on that day.

== Honours ==
Shamrock Rovers

- League of Ireland: 1922–23, 1924–25, 1926–27, 1930–31
- FAI Cup (6): 1925, 1929, 1930, 1931, 1932, 1933
- League of Ireland Shield: 1924–25, 1926–27, 1931–32
- Leinster Senior Cup: 1923, 1927, 1929, 1930
- Leinster Senior League: 1921–22

== Sources ==
- Paul Doolan; Robert Goggins. The Hoops. ISBN 0-7171-2121-6.
