= 1925–26 League of Ireland =

League of Ireland
- Season: 1925–26
- Dates: 29 August 1925 – 3 January 1926
- Champions: Shelbourne (1st title)
- Matches played: 90
- Goals scored: 445 (4.94 per match)
- Top goalscorer: Billy Farrell (24 goals)
- Biggest home win: Shamrock Rovers 10-2 Pioneers
- Biggest away win: Jacobs 0-8 Shelbourne; Pioneers 0-8 Shelbourne
- Highest scoring: Shamrock Rovers 10-2 Pioneers

The 1925–26 League of Ireland was the fifth season of the League of Ireland.

Shelbourne won their first title.

== Changes from 1924–25 ==
Brooklyn were not re-elected to the League, while Brideville were elected.

Elected	Not Re-elected
Brideville	Brooklyn

== Season Overview ==
It began on 29 August 1925 and ended on 3 January 1926. Shamrock Rovers were the defending champions.

== Teams ==
Locations of the 1925/26 League of Ireland Division 'A' teams

Team	Location	Stadium
Athlone Town	Athlone	Sports Ground
Bohemians	Dublin (Phibsborough)	Dalymount Park
Bray Unknowns	Bray	Woodbrook Ground
Brideville	Dublin (The Liberties)	Richmond Park
Fordsons	Cork	Ballinlough Road
Jacobs	Dublin (Crumlin)	Rutland Avenue
Pioneers	Dublin (Whitehall)	The Thatch
St. James's Gate	Dublin (Crumlin)	St. James's Park
Shamrock Rovers	Dublin (Milltown)	Milltown Park
Shelbourne	Dublin (Ringsend)	Shelbourne Park

== Table ==
Pos	Team	Pld	W	D	L	GF	GA	GD	Pts
1	Shelbourne (C)	18	14	3	1	65	23	+42	31
2	Shamrock Rovers	18	13	3	2	62	21	+41	29
3	Fordsons (Note: Bohemians were fined 2 points which were awarded to Fordsons.)	18	12	1	5	58	31	+27	27
4	Bohemians	18	10	2	6	50	28	+22	20
5	Jacobs	18	7	4	7	40	48	−8	18
6	Brideville	18	6	4	8	36	53	−17	16
7	Athlone Town	18	7	1	10	46	56	−10	15
8	St. James's Gate	18	4	3	11	33	48	−15	11
9	Bray Unknowns	18	4	3	11	34	55	−21	11
10	Pioneers	18	1	0	17	21	82	−61	2

Rules for classification: 1) points; 2) goal difference; 3) number of goals scored.
(C) Champions

== Results ==
Home \ Away	ATH	BOH	BRY	BRI	FOR	JAC	PIO	STG	SHM	SHE
Athlone Town	—	1–2	2–3	3–0	2–5	4–2	4–3	5–1	1–5	1–4
Bohemians	6–3	—	7–2	6–0	0–2	2–2	4–1	1–1	1–4	0–2
Bray Unknowns	3–5	2–6	—	7–1	1–1	2–5	3–1	1–3	1–1	0–5
Brideville	3–3	2–1	1–0	—	3–2	4–1	4–3	3–2	1–4	2–3
Fordsons	6–5	0–2	3–2	6–2	—	4–0	8–2	3–1	0–2	5–1
Jacobs	4–1	3–1	1–1	4–4	1–2	—	2–0	4–2	1–4	0–8
Pioneers	1–2	0–4	1–3	2–1	0–7	3–5	—	2–4	0–5	0–8
St. James's Gate	2–3	1–4	4–2	2–2	0–2	0–2	3–0	—	3–3	1–4
Shamrock Rovers	3–0	0–2	5–0	2–1	3–0	4–1	10–2	3–2	—	2–2
Shelbourne	3–1	2–1	3–1	2–2	4–2	2–2	5–0	4–1	3–2	—

Legend: Blue = home team win; Yellow = draw; Red = away team win.

== Top goalscorers ==
Pos	Player	Club	Goals
1	Billy Farrell	Shamrock Rovers	24
2	John Simpson	Shelbourne	18
3	Jim Sweeney	Athlone Town	17

== See also ==
- 1925–26 FAI Cup
