= Denis Doyle =

Irish footballer

Dinny Doyle
Personal information
- Date of birth: 1900
- Place of birth: Dublin, Ireland
- Place of death: Niagara Falls, New York, USA
- Position: Wing half

Senior career*
Years	Team	Apps	(Gls)
1922–1927	Shamrock Rovers		
1927	Philadelphia Celtic	10	(0)
1927–1929	Fall River	93	(0)
1929–1931	Pawtucket Rangers	49	(1)
1931	New York Yankees	9	(0)

International career
1926	Irish Free State	1	(0)
- * Club domestic league appearances and goals

Denis Doyle (born 1900, date of death unknown) was an Irish football wing half who played professionally in Ireland and the United States. He earned one cap with the Irish Free State national football team in 1926. He was born in Dublin.

He joined Shamrock Rovers in 1922 and played in that year's FAI Cup final which they lost in a replay. He then moved back to centre-half until he left the club in 1927. That year, he moved to the USA with Bob Fullam where he signed with the Philadelphia Celtic of the American Soccer League. The team played only ten games before failing financially. He then transferred to the Fall River He won three league titles with the 'Marksmen'. He began the 1929-1930 season with the 'Marksmen', playing three games, before transferring to the Pawtucket Rangers. In 1931, he moved to the New York Yankees. He spent his last years in Niagara Falls.

He won one cap for the Irish Free State against Italy in Turin on 21 March 1926.

He was part of the Rovers sides that won two leagues in the 1920s going through the entire season unbeaten. He was also part of the side that played in the club's opening fixtures at Glenmalure Park in 1926.

His father, Tommy Doyle, had played for the Hoops in the early years and his younger brother, also Tommy, played for Rovers after Dinny emigrated. A nephew, Jackie Mooney, won two FAI Cups with Rovers in the 1960s. Dinny's great grandson, Jason Doyle, played for Rovers during the 1991–1992 season. Dinny's brother, Christy (Kit), born 1904, had a son also named Christy who played in Toronto, New York and Chicago in the 1960s and had the honor of winning both the United States and Canadian amateur National Championships in the same year 1968. With the Chicago Kickers in July 1968 and the Toronto Royals in September 1968 before returning to Chicago in 1969 and rejoining the Kickers to win the title again in 1970. Now retired in Charlotte, North Carolina.

== Honours ==
- League of Ireland: 3
  - Shamrock Rovers - 1922–23, 1924–25, 1926–27
- FAI Cup: 1
  - Shamrock Rovers - 1925
- League of Ireland Shield: 2
  - Shamrock Rovers - 1924-25, 1926–27
- Leinster Senior Cup: 1
  - Shamrock Rovers - 1923
- Leinster Senior League: 1
  - Shamrock Rovers - 1921–22

== Sources ==
- Paul Doolan; Robert Goggins. The Hoops. ISBN 0-7171-2121-6.
