= Kevin Kerr (Irish footballer) =

Irish footballer and race horse trainer

Kevin Kerr (died 2005) was an Irish soccer player during the 1930s and 1940s and a noted horse racing trainer as well.

== Career ==
He played for the amateur Bohemians during his career in Ireland. Kerr captained the club in 1942, twenty three years after his brother Bertie had the honour. They were the third set of brothers to captain Bohs; the Hooper and O'Kane brothers coming before them.

Kevin spent many years on the Bohemian F.C. Management Committee after retirement in the role of President of the club.

Away from football, Kevin trained Sea Charger to victory in the 1953 Irish 2,000 Guineas and Irish St. Leger. More Group One success came in 1965 when he trained Green Banner to win the Irish 2,000 Guineas.

Kevin Kerr died in April 2005 "in his late eighties".
