= Ned Brooks (footballer) =

Irish footballer

Personal information
- Full name: Edward Alphonsus Brooks
- Date of birth: 14 August 1891
- Place of birth: Dublin, Ireland
- Date of death: 8 March 1958 (aged 66)
- Place of death: Dublin, Ireland
- Height: 5 ft 7 in (1.70 m)
- Positions: Centre forward; inside left

Senior career*
Years	Team	Apps	(Gls)
1914–19xx	Bohemians		
1919–1920	Shelbourne	13	(7)
1920–1921	Bohemians		
1921	Stockport County	12	(1)
- Bohemians
- Athlone Town
- Brideville

International career
1919	Irish League XI	1	(0)
1920	Ireland (IFA)	1	(0)
19xx	League of Ireland XI	1	
1924	Irish Free State (FAI)	1	(3)
- * Club domestic league appearances and goals

Edward Alphonsus Brooks (14 August 1891 – 8 March 1958) was an Irish footballer who played as centre-forward or inside-left for, among others, Shelbourne, Bohemians, Stockport County and Athlone Town. Brookes was a dual internationalist and played for both Ireland teams – the IFA XI and the FAI XI.

== Club career ==
=== Shelbourne ===
Brooks played at Shelbourne during the 1919–20 season alongside Val Harris and Bob Fullam and finished as the club's top goalscorer. He also helped Shelbourne win the Irish Cup. Shelbourne were awarded the cup after both Belfast Celtic and Glentoran were expelled from the competition. While playing for Shelbourne, Brooks also represented the Irish League XI against a Scottish League XI in a 2–0 defeat at Windsor Park in 1919.

== Irish international ==
When Brooks began his international career in 1920, Ireland was represented by a single team, selected by the Belfast-based Irish Football Association. However, during the 1920s, Ireland was partitioned into Northern Ireland and the Irish Free State. Amid these political upheavals, a rival association, the Football Association of Ireland, emerged in Dublin and from 1924 organised their own national team. As a result, several notable Irish players from this era, including Brookes played for both teams – the IFA XI and the FAI XI.

=== IFA XI ===
Brooks made his one and only appearance for the IFA XI while playing for Shelbourne. On 3 March 1920, in a team that also included Elisha Scott, Bert Manderson, Bill Lacey and Billy Gillespie, he played for the IFA XI against Scotland in a 3–0 defeat at Celtic Park.

=== FAI XI ===
On 14 June 1924, while playing for Bohemians, Brooks also played for the FAI XI, scoring a hat-trick against the United States in 3–1 win at Dalymount Park. His teammates that day included, among others, Frank Collins, Paddy Duncan, Tommy Muldoon, Charlie Dowdall and Johnny Murray. In March 1926 while playing for Athlone Town, Brooks was also called up for the FAI XI to play in an away game against Italy. However a personal tragedy meant he was unable to travel and win another cap. A week before the team was due to leave for Italy, his seven-year-old son, Harold, was knocked down by a car and died in hospital.

== Family ==
He was married to Elizabeth Brooks (née Smyth) and had another child named Pauline who died during infancy. He also had two sons named Cecil and Stanley (stan) and a daughter Phyllis. Brooks died on 8 March 1958 and was buried in Deansgrange Cemetery with his wife Elizabeth and son Stan.

== Honours ==
Shelbourne

- Irish Cup
  - Winners 1920: 1
