= Frank Collins (footballer) =

Irish footballer

Personal information
- Full name: Francis Joseph Collins
- Date of birth: 10 May 1893
- Place of birth: Dublin, Ireland
- Date of death: Unknown
- Position: Goalkeeper

Youth career
- Wanderers (Dublin)

Senior career*
Years	Team	Apps	(Gls)
1918–1921	Jacobs		
1921–1922	Celtic	2	(0)
1922–1932.	Jacobs		

International career
1921	Ireland Juniors	1	(0)
1922	Ireland (IFA)	1	(0)
1924–1927	Irish Free State (FAI)	2	(0)
1924-1929	League of Ireland XI	5	(0)
- * Club domestic league appearances and goals

Francis Joseph Collins (10 May 1893 – ?), was an Irish footballer who briefly played as goalkeeper for Celtic during the 1920s. Collins was a dual internationalist and played for both Ireland teams – the IFA XI and the FAI XI. He was born in Dublin, Ireland.

== Club career ==
Collins first came to prominence while playing junior football with Jacobs from about 1918 onwards and was subsequently spotted by Celtic while playing for Ireland Juniors. His relatively late rise to prominence can be explained by his service during the First World War with the Royal Army Medical Corps and a subsequent serious injury he received while serving in France. In May 1921 he joined Celtic in time for an end-of-season match in Paris against Cercle Athlétique. The following season Collins provided cover for regular goalkeeper Charlie Shaw, making his Scottish League debut in a 4–0 win against Dumbarton on 6 September 1921. At the end of the season however, Celtic made Collins available for transfer, and he returned to Jacobs to play in the newly formed League of Ireland. While with Jacobs, Collins also represented the League of Ireland XI. He remained with the Dublin club until they left the League of Ireland in 1932.

== Irish international ==
When Collins began his international career in 1922, Ireland was represented by a single team, selected by the Belfast-based Irish Football Association. However, during the 1920s, Ireland was partitioned into Northern Ireland and the Irish Free State. Amid these political upheavals, a rival association, the Football Association of Ireland, emerged in Dublin and from 1924 organised their own national team. As a result, several notable Irish players from this era, including Collins played for both teams – the IFA XI and the FAI XI.

=== IFA XI ===
Collins represented the IFA XI at both junior and senior levels. On 12 March 1921, while still playing for Jacobs, he played for the first IFA junior team to beat Scotland Juniors at home. He kept a clean-sheet in a 1–0 win at Celtic Park and impressed the host club. Collins made his one and only appearance for the senior IFA XI while playing for Celtic. Despite his lack of first-team action, Collins was selected for the match on 4 March 1922 with Scotland. This time, however, the IFA XI lost 2–1 in a game also played at Celtic Park. His teammates that day included, among others, Mick O'Brien and Bill Lacey.

=== FAI XI ===
After returning to Jacobs, Collins also played twice for the FAI XI. On 14 June 1924 he kept goal against the United States in 3–1 win at Dalymount Park. His teammates that day included, among others, Ed Brookes, Paddy Duncan, Tommy Muldoon, Charlie Dowdall and Johnny Murray. Collins had to wait nearly four years before making his second appearance for the FAI XI. On 23 April 1927 he played against Italy B at Lansdowne Road. His teammates that day included Mick O'Brien and Bill Lacey, both of whom had previously played with him for the IFA XI. The FAI XI lost the friendly 2–1 and Collins was blamed for conceding a soft second goal, allowing a poorly hit shot from 20 yards to slip under his body. However, a colleague later claimed that a war wound, which meant Collins was slow to get down on his right side, may have been to blame.
