= Jeremiah Robinson =

Irish footballer (1920s-1930s)

Jeremiah Robinson was an Irish soccer player during the 1920s and 1930s. He was also known as "Sam".

Robinson was a tough defender during this era in the League of Ireland and was part of the Bohemians team of 1927/28 who won every trophy on offer that season - League of Ireland, FAI Cup, Shield and Leinster Senior Cup.

He won 2 full international caps for the Irish Free State, making his debut against Belgium in 1928.

He was the brother of fellow Bohemian, Christy.

== Honours ==
- League of Ireland: 1
  - Bohemians - 1927/28
- FAI Cup: 1
  - Bohemians - 1928
- League of Ireland Shield: 1
  - Bohemians - 1928
