= Harry Cannon =

Irish footballer (1897–1944)

Personal information
- Full name: Henry James Cannon
- Date of birth: 11 July 1897
- Place of birth: Dungloe, Ireland
- Date of death: 16 March 1944 (aged 46)
- Position: Goalkeeper

Senior career*
Years	Team	Apps	(Gls)
1924–1938	Bohemians	379	(3)

International career
1926–1928	Republic of Ireland	2	(0)
- * Club domestic league appearances and goals

Henry James Cannon (11 July 1897 – 16 March 1944) was an Irish footballer during the 1920s and 1930s.

== Bohemians ==
Cannon was a goalkeeper during this era in the League of Ireland and spent most of his career with Bohemians. He captained the All-Conquering Bohemians team of 1927/28 who won every trophy on offer that season – League of Ireland, FAI Cup, League of Ireland Shield and Leinster Senior Cup. Harry spent the best part of a decade with Bohs picking up numerous medals along the way. Cannon was also an occasional penalty taker for Bohemians, scoring three times in his career from the penalty spot. After retirement, Harry had a spell on the Bohemian F.C. Management Committee.

== International ==
He won full international caps for Irish Free State against Italy in March 1926. This side also included Bohemian colleague Jack McCarthy. He was also part of the side that recorded defeated Belgium in February 1928.

== Other ==
An accomplished cricketer at club level, Cannon captained Civil Service Cricket Club for a time. Harry also kept goal for the Railway Union field hockey team. He also led the Irish Olympic Team as chef de mission at the 1932 Summer Olympics in Los Angeles. Cannon was a career soldier in the Irish Army attaining the rank of captain.

== Honours ==
- League of Ireland: 4
  - Bohemians – 1927/28, 1929/30, 1933/34, 1935/36
- FAI Cup: 2
  - Bohemians – 1928, 1935
- League of Ireland Shield: 3
  - Bohemians – 1928, 1929, 1934,
- Full International Caps for Ireland
