= 1926–27 League of Ireland =

League of Ireland
- Season: 1926–27
- Dates: 21 August 1926 – 7 May 1927
- Champions: Shamrock Rovers (3rd title)
- Matches played: 90
- Goals scored: 376 (4.18 per match)
- Top goalscorer: David Byrne; John McMillan (17 goals each)
- Biggest home win: Shelbourne 9-0 Bray Unknowns
- Biggest away win: St. James's Gate 2-8 Shelbourne
- Highest scoring: St. James's Gate 2-8 Shelbourne

The 1926–27 League of Ireland was the sixth season of the League of Ireland.

Shamrock Rovers won their third title.

== Overview ==
It began on 21 August 1926 and ended on 7 May 1927. Shelbourne were the defending champions.

=== Team changes ===
Pioneers were not re-elected to the League, while Dundalk GNR were elected.

| Elected | Not Re-elected |
|---|---|
| Dundalk GNR | Pioneers |

== Teams ==
Locations of the 1926-27 League of Ireland teams

| Team | Location | Stadium |
|---|---|---|
| Athlone Town | Athlone | Sports Ground |
| Bohemians | Dublin (Phibsborough) | Dalymount Park |
| Bray Unknowns | Bray | Woodbrook Ground |
| Brideville | Dublin (The Liberties) | Richmond Park |
| Dundalk GNR | Dundalk | Athletic Grounds |
| Fordsons | Cork | Ballinlough Road |
| Jacobs | Dublin (Crumlin) | Rutland Avenue |
| St. James's Gate | Dublin (Crumlin) | St. James's Park |
| Shamrock Rovers | Dublin (Milltown) | Glenmalure Park |
| Shelbourne | Dublin (Ringsend) | Shelbourne Park |

== Table ==
| Pos | Team | Pld | W | D | L | GF | GA | GD | Pts |
|---|---|---|---|---|---|---|---|---|---|
| 1 | Shamrock Rovers (C) | 18 | 14 | 4 | 0 | 60 | 20 | +40 | 32 |
| 2 | Shelbourne | 18 | 13 | 3 | 2 | 63 | 24 | +39 | 29 |
| 3 | Bohemians | 18 | 10 | 5 | 3 | 36 | 24 | +12 | 25 |
| 4 | Fordsons | 18 | 7 | 3 | 8 | 34 | 32 | +2 | 17 |
| 5 | Athlone Town | 18 | 6 | 5 | 7 | 41 | 43 | −2 | 17 |
| 6 | Bray Unknowns | 18 | 6 | 1 | 11 | 37 | 58 | −21 | 13 |
| 7 | Jacobs | 18 | 5 | 3 | 10 | 23 | 47 | −24 | 13 |
| 8 | Dundalk GNR | 18 | 3 | 6 | 9 | 30 | 40 | −10 | 12 |
| 9 | St. James's Gate | 18 | 5 | 2 | 11 | 30 | 49 | −19 | 12 |
| 10 | Brideville | 18 | 2 | 6 | 10 | 22 | 39 | −17 | 10 |

Rules for classification: 1) points; 2) goal difference; 3) number of goals scored.
(C) Champions

== Results ==
| Home \ Away | ATH | BOH | BRY | BRI | DUN | FOR | JAC | STG | SHM | SHE |
|---|---|---|---|---|---|---|---|---|---|---|
| Athlone Town | — | 3–3 | 5–1 | 5–0 | 3–1 | 2–2 | 5–2 | 0–3 | 2–5 | 2–4 |
| Bohemians | 3–1 | — | 3–1 | 1–0 | 4–2 | 2–1 | 4–0 | 3–0 | 1–2 | 3–2 |
| Bray Unknowns | 2–5 | 2–0 | — | 4–2 | 2–1 | 3–2 | 3–0 | 4–2 | 3–6 | 1–2 |
| Brideville | 0–0 | 0–0 | 3–3 | — | 4–3 | 2–1 | 2–3 | 1–2 | 1–2 | 1–3 |
| Dundalk GNR | 2–3 | 1–1 | 4–1 | 1–1 | — | 4–2 | 3–0 | 1–1 | 0–5 | 0–2 |
| Fordsons | 2–1 | 1–1 | 4–1 | 4–2 | 2–1 | — | 3–1 | 3–1 | 0–0 | 1–3 |
| Jacobs | 1–1 | 0–2 | 4–3 | 2–2 | 1–1 | 1–0 | — | 4–2 | 0–3 | 0–4 |
| St. James's Gate | 5–2 | 1–2 | 3–1 | 2–0 | 2–2 | 1–3 | 0–2 | — | 1–5 | 2–8 |
| Shamrock Rovers | 6–0 | 4–0 | 3–2 | 0–0 | 3–3 | 4–2 | 3–0 | 3–2 | — | 3–3 |
| Shelbourne | 1–1 | 3–3 | 9–0 | 3–1 | 3–0 | 2–1 | 6–2 | 5–0 | 0–3 | — |

Legend: Blue = home team win; Yellow = draw; Red = away team win.

== Top goalscorers ==
| Pos | Player | Club | Goals |
|---|---|---|---|
| 1 | David Byrne | Shamrock Rovers | 17 |
| 1 | John McMillan | Shelbourne | 17 |
| 2 | Ned Brooks | Athlone Town | 14 |
| 2 | Bob Fullam | Shamrock Rovers | 14 |

== See also ==
- 1926–27 FAI Cup
