= Bob Fullam =

Irish footballer (1897–1974)

Personal information
- Full name: Robert Fullam
- Date of birth: 17 September 1895
- Place of birth: Ringsend, Dublin, Ireland
- Date of death: 21 July 1971
- Height: 5 ft 9 in (1.75 m)
- Position: Forward

Youth career
- 1913: St Brendans
- 1914: North End

Senior career*
Years	Team	Apps	(Gls)
1918–1921	Shelbourne		
1921–1923	Shamrock Rovers		(27)
1923–1924	Leeds United	7	(2)
1924–1927	Shamrock Rovers		(49)
1927	Holley Carburetor		
1927–1928	Philadelphia Celtic	5	(3)
1928–1932	Shamrock Rovers		(16)

International career
1926–1927	Ireland (FAI)	2	(1)
1925–1930	League of Ireland XI	6	(2)
- * Club domestic league appearances and goals

Robert Fullam (17 September 1895 – 21 July 1971) was an Irish footballer who played as a forward. He was regarded as one of the best known players in the League of Ireland during the 1920s.

== Club career ==
Born in Ringsend, the son of John and Mary Fullam, he worked as a docker in Dublin, and played for Shelbourne from 1918 to 1921, winning the Irish Cup in 1920. He then transferred to Shamrock Rovers and played in the inaugural Free State Cup final in 1922. In that match, his skirmishes with Charlie Dowdall of eventual champions St. James's Gate contributed to post-match disturbances involving players and supporters. This led to a ban for the start of the following season. Nevertheless, he finished top scorer with 27 goals in 22 games, as Rovers won their first League title. He transferred to Leeds United for the 1923–24 season, but played only seven games. He returned to Rovers the next season, helping them to the Double, as "give it to Bob" became a Dublin catchphrase. In the 1926 Cup final, he famously pulled out of a goalmouth challenge, sacrificing a goal (and the Cup) to prevent injuring the Fordsons goalkeeper.

In the 1927–28 season, he went to the United States along with Dinny Doyle and several other players from both North and South. Upon their arrival in Philadelphia, they formed their own club which was known as Irish Philadelphia Celtic. After a year, Fullam returned to Dublin, where he renewed his association with Rovers. His time with Rovers was littered with medals. He won the League and the Free State Cup four times, scoring 92 league goals and nine cup goals along with six Inter-League caps. Fullam played alongside his second cousin Billy Behan, who later became a successful scout for Manchester United.

== International career ==
Fullam made his debut for the Irish Free State against Italy in Turin in 1926; he scored in the return match against Italy in 1927. As he was now 30, and the selectors had a preference for young players, this second cap was his last. He continued to play for Shamrock Rovers into the early 1930s.

== Post-playing career ==
After his playing days, Fullam continued with the Hoops as a coach, a capacity he held until his departure to London in 1945.

In 1956, Fullam was awarded damages in a libel case taken against the Sunday Dispatch for a story that the journalist admitted making up.

Fullam died in Slough on 21 July 1971.

== Honours ==
Shelbourne

- Irish Cup: 1920

Shamrock Rovers

- League of Ireland: 1922–23, 1924–25, 1926–27, 1930–31
- Free State Cup: 1925, 1929, 1930, 1931
- League of Ireland Shield: 1924–25, 1926–27, 1931–32
- Leinster Senior Cup: 1923, 1927, 1929, 1930
- Leinster Senior League: 1921–22

Individual

- League of Ireland Top Scorer: 1922–23 (27 goals)
