= Christy Robinson =

Irish footballer (1902–1954)

Christopher "Christy" Robinson (1902 – 21 February 1954) was an Irish soccer player during the 1920s and 1930s.

Robinson was a skilful inside forward during this era in the League of Ireland and was part of the All-Conquering Bohemians team of 1927/28 who won every trophy on offer that season – League of Ireland, FAI Cup, Shield and Leinster Senior Cup. He holds the honour of scoring Bohemians' first ever goal in the FAI Cup when he netted the first in a 7–1 win over Athlone Town on 28 January 1922.

At international level, he was part of Ireland's squad at the Paris Olympic Games of 1924, but he did not play in any matches.

He was the brother of fellow Bohemian Jeremiah
