= Johnny Murray (footballer) =

Irish footballer

Personal information
- Date of birth: 25 February 1898
- Place of birth: Dublin, Ireland
- Date of death: 12 November 1954 (aged 56)
- Place of death: Dublin, Ireland
- Position: Winger

Senior career*
Years	Team	Apps	(Gls)
19xx–1921	Blue Crusaders		
1921–1926	Bohemians	63	(11)
1926–19xx	Drumcondra		

International career
1924	Irish Free State	4	(0)
- * Club domestic league appearances and goals

Johnny Murray (25 February 1898 – 12 November 1954) was an Irish soccer player during the 1920s.

== Career ==
Murray was a skilful winger who played for Ormeau, Blue Crusaders, Bohemians and Drumcondra He joined Bohs in 1921 and stayed at Dalymount Park until 1926 when he joined Drumcondra. He made 63 league appearances and scored 11 goals while with Bohs. Johnny was part of their first ever league winning side alongside the likes of Stephen McCarthy in 1923/24 and played for Ireland in the Paris Olympic Games of 1924.
