= Ireland at the 1924 Summer Olympics =

- IOC code: IRL
- NOC: Olympic Federation of Ireland
- Website: olympics.ie

in Paris
- Flag bearer: John O'Grady
- Medals: Gold 0 Silver 1 Bronze 1 Total 2

Summer Olympics appearances (overview)
- 1924; 1928; 1932; 1936; 1948; 1952; 1956; 1960; 1964; 1968; 1972; 1976; 1980; 1984; 1988; 1992; 1996; 2000; 2004; 2008; 2012; 2016; 2020; 2024

Other related appearances
- Great Britain (1896–1920)

Ireland competed as a national delegation for the first time at the 1924 Summer Olympics in Paris. (Note: Ireland teams had competed in polo in 1908 and cycling in 1912, accredited as part of the British Olympic Association.) The Irish Olympic Council had been admitted to the International Olympic Committee after the Irish Free State's 1922 independence from the United Kingdom of Great Britain and Ireland. The Council regarded itself as an all-Ireland body, including Northern Ireland as well as the Free State; it competed as "Ireland" (Irlande) rather than "Irish Free State" (État libre d'Irlande). The team used the Irish tricolour as its flag and "Let Erin Remember" anthem.

== Medalists ==
Medal	Name	Sport	Event
Silver	Jack Butler Yeats	Art Competition	Painting
Bronze	Oliver St. John Gogarty	Art Competition	Literature

== Aquatics ==
=== Water polo ===
Ireland made its debut Olympic water polo appearance.

Roster

- Charles Barrett
- James Beckett
- James Brady
- John Convery
- Cecil Fagan
- Charles Fagan
- Norman Judd
- John O'Connor
- Michael O'Connor
- Noel Purcell

First round
- Bye
Quarterfinals

Czechoslovakia	4–2	Ireland	Piscine des Tourelles

== Athletics ==
Ten athletes represented Ireland in 1924. It was the nation's debut appearance in the sport as well as the Games.

Ranks given are within the heat.

Athlete	Event	Heats		Quarterfinals		Semifinals		Final	
Athlete	Event	Result	Rank	Result	Rank	Result	Rank	Result	Rank
Paddy Bermingham	Discus throw	N/A				40.42	4	Did not advance	
Sean Kelly	3000 m steeplechase	N/A				Unknown	7	Did not advance	
Sean Lavan	200 m	23.2	1 Q	Unknown	4	Did not advance			
Sean Lavan	400 m	51.2	2 Q	49.8	4	Did not advance			
Norman McEachern	800 m	N/A		Unknown	2 Q	1:58.3	5	Did not advance	
William Lowe	100 m	Unknown	4	Did not advance					
William Lowe	200 m	23.0	2 Q	Unknown	5	Did not advance			
John O'Connor	Triple jump	N/A				13.99	5	Did not advance	
John O'Grady	Shot put	N/A				12.75	8	Did not advance	
John Ryan	10000 m	N/A						Did not finish	
John Ryan	Cross country	N/A						Did not finish	
William Shanahan	Decathlon	N/A						5426.680	19
Larry Stanley	High jump	N/A				1.80	4	Did not advance	

== Boxing ==
Seven boxers represented Ireland at the 1924 Games. It was the nation's debut in the sport as well as the Olympics as an independent nation. Dwyer was the most successful Irish boxer, taking fourth place. His three bouts won were three times as many as the rest of the team combined, with Murphy getting the only other win.

Boxer	Weight class	Round of 32	Round of 16	Quarterfinals	Semifinals	Final / Bronze match	
Boxer	Weight class	Opposition Score	Opposition Score	Opposition Score	Opposition Score	Opposition Score	Rank
Mossy Doyle	Featherweight	Fields (USA); L	Did not advance				17
Patrick Dwyer	Welterweight	Basham (GBR); W	Cornelissen (NED); W	Stauffer (SUI); W	Méndez (ARG); L	Lewis (CAN); L	4
Robert Hilliard	Bantamweight	Bye	Pertuzzo (ARG); L	Did not advance			9
James Kelleher	Lightweight	Rothwell (USA); L	Did not advance				17
John Kidley	Light heavyweight	Bye	Sørsdal (NOR); L	Did not advance			9
Myles McDonagh	Flyweight	Bye	Biete (ESP); L	Did not advance			9
William Murphy	Middleweight	Bye	Nowak (POL); W	Black (CAN); L	Did not advance		5

Opponent nation	Wins	Losses	Percent
Argentina	0	2	.000
Canada	0	2	.000
Great Britain	1	0	1.000
Netherlands	1	0	1.000
Norway	0	1	.000
Poland	1	0	1.000
Spain	0	1	.000
Switzerland	1	0	1.000
United States	0	2	.000
Total	4	8	.333

Round	Wins	Losses	Percent
Round of 32	1	2	.333
Round of 16	2	3	.400
Quarterfinals	1	1	.500
Semifinals	0	1	.000
Final	0	0	–
Bronze match	0	1	.000
Total	4	8	.333

== Football ==
The Football Association of the Irish Free State or FAIFS (now the Football Association of Ireland or FAI) sent a team of amateur players to the Olympic tournament, which was a single-elimination tournament. The Irish Olympic Council shunned the FAIFS as the Council saw itself as an all-Ireland body and the FAIFS was "partitionist" by restricting itself to the Free State. (Note: The Irish Football Association governed the sport in Northern Ireland) The FAIFS had to liaise directly with FIFA regarding its entry, rather than going through the Council. Contemporary records, such as the FAIFS annual report, regarded these three internationals as full internationals, despite featuring amateur teams. After the 1960s these games were reclassified as amateur internationals. However, in June 1999 FIFA declared that early Olympic internationals could be considered as full internationals. That would make them the first games of what is now the Republic of Ireland team.

Of the 22 entrants, 12 teams played in the first round. The 6 winners then joined another 10 teams, including Ireland, in the second round. On May 28 at the Stade Olympique, Ireland beat Bulgaria 1-0 with Paddy Duncan scoring the only goal. As a result of this win they qualified for the quarter-finals. On June 2 they played the Netherlands at the Stade de Paris in Saint-Ouen but lost 2-1 after extra-time. However, the following day, before returning home, the team played one more game, beating Estonia, 3-1 in a friendly at the Stade Olympique.

Round 1
Bye

Round 2

May 28, 1924

(Republic of Ireland) Ireland (FAIFS)	1–0	Bulgaria
Duncan 75'	Report

Stade Olympique, Colombes
Attendance: 1,500
Referee: A. Henriot (FRA)

Quarterfinals

June 2, 1924

Netherlands	2–1 (a.e.t.)	(Republic of Ireland) Ireland (FAIFS)
Formenoy 7' 104'	Report	Ghent 33'

Stade de Paris
Attendance: 2,000
Referee: Heinrich Retschury (AUT)

Final rank
5th place

Goalkeeper

- Paddy Reilly (Athlone Town)

Defenders

- Bertie Kerr (Bohemians)
- Jack McCarthy (Bohemians)
- Thomas Murphy (St James's Gate)

Midfielders

- John Thomas (Bohemians)
- John Joe Dykes (captain) (Athlone Town)
- Tommy Muldoon (Athlone Town)
- Christy Robinson (Bohemians)
- Ernest McKay (St James's Gate)

Forwards

- Charlie Dowdall (St James's Gate)
- Paddy Duncan (St James's Gate)
- Frank Ghent (Athlone Town)
- Johnny Murray (Bohemians)
- Michael Farrell (St James's Gate)
- Joe Kendrick (Brooklyn F.C.)
- Dinny Hannon (Athlone Town)

Players reserves:

- John Lea (Shelbourne)
- Frank Heaney (St James's Gate)
- Robert Cowzer (Shelbourne)
- Ernie Crawford (Bohemians)
- Thomas Aungier (St James's Gate)
- J. Healy

*Note: Murphy, Thomas, Robinson and Dowdall only played in friendly against Estonia.

== Tennis ==
Men

Athlete	Event	Round of 128	Round of 64	Round of 32	Round of 16	Quarterfinals	Semifinals	Final	
Athlete	Event	Opposition Score	Opposition Score	Opposition Score	Opposition Score	Opposition Score	Opposition Score	Opposition Score	Rank
William Ireland	Singles	Halot (BEL); L 1–6, 4–6, 4–6	Did not advance						
Edwin McCrea	Singles	Debran (SUI); L 4–6, 4–6, 0–6	Did not advance						
William Ireland; Edwin McCrea	Doubles	—N/a	Debran / Syz (SUI); L 6–4, 2–6, 2–6, 6–1, 4–6	Did not advance					

Women

Athlete	Event	Round of 64	Round of 32	Round of 16	Quarterfinals	Semifinals	Final	
Athlete	Event	Opposition Score	Opposition Score	Opposition Score	Opposition Score	Opposition Score	Opposition Score	Rank
Rebecca Blair-White	Singles	Bye	Gagliardi (ITA); L 6–4, 5–7, 2–6	Did not advance				
Mary Wallis	Singles	Covell (GBR); L 6–3, 0–6, 2–6	Did not advance					
Rebecca Blair-White; Mary Wallis	Doubles	—N/a	Bye	Fick / von Essen (SWE); L 2–6, 7–5, 2–6	Did not advance			

Mixed

Athlete	Event	Round of 32	Round of 16	Quarterfinals	Semifinals	Final	
Athlete	Event	Opposition Score	Opposition Score	Opposition Score	Opposition Score	Opposition Score	Rank
Rebecca Blair-White; William Ireland	Doubles	Covell / Godfree (GBR); L 2–6, 4–6	Did not advance				
Edwin McCrea; Mary Wallis	Doubles	Bye	Polley / Jacob (IND); W 9–7, 4–6, 9–7	McKane / Gilbert (GBR); L 1–6, 5–7	Did not advance		
