= Tennis at the 1924 Summer Olympics – Women's doubles =

Tennis at the Olympics

Women's doubles at the Games of the VIII Olympiad
- Venue: Stade de Colombes
- Dates: 14–19 July
- Competitors: 17 teams from 11 nations

Medalists
| 1st place, gold medalist(s) | | Hazel Wightman; Helen Wills; United States |
| 2nd place, silver medalist(s) | | Phyllis Covell; Kathleen McKane; Great Britain |
| 3rd place, bronze medalist(s) | | Evelyn Colyer; Dorothy Shepherd-Barron; Great Britain |

Women's doubles
- Tennis at the 1924 Summer Olympics

Events
| Singles | men | women |
| Doubles | men | women | mixed |
| ← 1920 · | Summer Olympics | · 1988 → |

The women's doubles tennis competition was one of five tennis events at the 1924 Summer Olympics.

== Draw ==
=== Key ===
- Q = Qualifier
- WC = Wild card
- LL = Lucky loser
- Alt = Alternate
- SE = Special exempt
- PR = Protected ranking
- ITF = ITF entry
- JE = Junior exempt
- w/o = Walkover
- r = Retired
- d = Defaulted
- SR = Special ranking

=== Finals ===
Semifinals
Marguerite Billout (FRA); Yvonne Bourgeois (FRA) | 2 | 2
Phyllis Covell (GBR); Kathleen McKane (GBR) | 6 | 6
Dorothy Shepherd-Barron (GBR); Evelyn Colyer (GBR) | 3 | 6 | 5
Helen Wills Moody (USA); Hazel Wightman (USA) | 6 | 1 | 7

Final (gold-medal match)
Phyllis Covell (GBR); Kathleen McKane (GBR) | 5 | 6
Helen Wills Moody (USA); Hazel Wightman (USA) | 7 | 8
Bronze-medal match
Marguerite Billout (FRA); Yvonne Bourgeois (FRA) | 1 | 2
Dorothy Shepherd-Barron (GBR); Evelyn Colyer (GBR) | 6 | 6

=== Top half ===
First round
M Jessup (USA); E Goss (USA) | 1 | 2
P Covell (GBR); K McKane (GBR) | 6 | 6

Second round
H Contostavlos (GRE); L Valaoritou-Skaramaga (GRE) | w/o
R Gagliardi (ITA); G Ferelli (ITA)
M Billout (FRA); Y Bourgeois (FRA) | 2 | 6 | 6
R Torras (ESP); E Álvarez (ESP) | 6 | 3 | 4
M Wallis (IRL); R Blair-White (IRL) | 2 | 7 | 2
S Fick (SWE); L von Essen (SWE) | 6 | 5 | 6
A de Borman (BEL); M Storms (BEL) | 1 | 2
P Covell (GBR); K McKane (GBR) | 6 | 6

Quarterfinals
R Gagliardi (ITA); G Ferelli (ITA) | 5 | 1
M Billout (FRA); Y Bourgeois (FRA) | 7 | 6
S Fick (SWE); L von Essen (SWE) | 2 | 3
P Covell (GBR); K McKane (GBR) | 6 | 6

Semifinals
M Billout (FRA); Y Bourgeois (FRA) | 2 | 2
P Covell (GBR); K McKane (GBR) | 6 | 6

=== Bottom half ===
First round

Second round
D Shepherd-Barron (GBR); E Colyer (GBR)
G Janssen (BEL); M Dupont (BEL) | w/o
A Golding (FRA); J Vaussard (FRA)
M Forlanini (ITA); P Bologna (ITA) | w/o
H Wightman (USA); H Wills (USA)
M Mallory (NOR); C Dahl (NOR) | w/o
I Péteri (HUN); M Krencsey (HUN)
ML Marnet (ESP); I Fonrodona (ESP) | w/o

Quarterfinals
D Shepherd-Barron (GBR); E Colyer (GBR) | 6 | 6
A Golding (FRA); J Vaussard (FRA) | 2 | 2
H Wightman (USA); H Wills (USA)
I Péteri (HUN); M Krencsey (HUN) | w/o

Semifinals
D Shepherd-Barron (GBR); E Colyer (GBR) | 3 | 6 | 5
H Wightman (USA); H Wills (USA) | 6 | 1 | 7

== Sources ==
- ITF, 2008 Olympic Tennis Event Media Guide
- M. Avé, Comité Olympique Français (ed.). Les Jeux de la VIII^{e} Olympiade Paris 1924 – Rapport Officiel (PDF) (in French). Paris: Librairie de France. pp. 379–384. Archived (PDF) from the original on 5 May 2011.
- Wudarski, Pawel (1999). "Wyniki Igrzysk Olimpijskich" (in Polish).
