= Tennis at the 1924 Summer Olympics – Mixed doubles =

Tennis at the Olympics

Mixed doubles at the Games of the VIII Olympiad
- Olympic tennis
- Venue: Stade Olympique Yves-du-Manoir
- Dates: 14–21 July 1924
- Competitors: 42 from 14 nations
- Teams: 21

Medalists
1st place, gold medalist(s)		United States: Hazel Hotchkiss Wightman; R. Norris Williams
2nd place, silver medalist(s)		United States: Marion Zinderstein; Vincent Richards
3rd place, bronze medalist(s)		Netherlands: Kea Bouman; Hendrik Timmer

Mixed doubles
- Tennis at the 1924 Summer Olympics

Events
Singles	men	women
Doubles	men	women	mixed
← 1920 ·	Summer Olympics	· 2012 →

The mixed doubles tennis competition was one of five tennis events at the 1924 Summer Olympics. 42 players (21 pairs) from 14 nations competed in the event, held from 14 to 21 July at the Stade Olympique Yves-du-Manoir. The United States had both of its pairs reach the final, with Hazel Hotchkiss Wightman and R. Norris Williams defeating Marion Zinderstein and Vincent Richards for the gold medal. It was the first mixed doubles victory for the United States. Netherlands, in its debut in the event, took bronze with Kea Bouman and Hendrik Timmer having a walkover victory in the bronze-medal match against Kathleen McKane Godfree and Brian Gilbert of Great Britain.

== Background ==
This was the fourth appearance of mixed doubles tennis. The event was first held in 1900 and would not be held again until 1912 (when both outdoor and indoor versions were held); it would then be held the next two Games in 1920 and 1924. Tennis was not a medal sport from 1928 to 1984, though there were demonstration events in 1968 (which included mixed doubles) and 1984 (which did not). Mixed doubles did not return with the rest of the tennis programme in 1988; instead, it was not until 2012 that mixed doubles returned to the programme, where it has been since.

Greece, Hungary, India, Ireland, the Netherlands, and Spain each made their mixed doubles debut. France competed for the fourth time, the only nation to have competed at each previous edition.

== Competition format ==
The competition was a single-elimination tournament with a bronze-medal match. All matches were best-of-three sets.

== Schedule ==
Date	Time	Round
Monday, 14 July 1924		Round of 32
Tuesday, 15 July 1924		Round of 32; Round of 16
Wednesday, 16 July 1924		Round of 16
Thursday, 17 July 1924		Round of 16
Friday, 18 July 1924		Round of 16; Quarterfinals
Saturday, 19 July 1924		Quarterfinals
Sunday, 20 July 1924		Semifinals
Monday, 21 July 1924		Bronze medal match Final

== Draw ==
=== Key ===
- Q = Qualifier
- WC = Wild card
- LL = Lucky loser
- Alt = Alternate
- SE = Special exempt
- PR = Protected ranking
- ITF = ITF entry
- JE = Junior exempt
- w/o = Walkover
- r = Retired
- d = Defaulted
- SR = Special ranking

=== Finals ===
Semifinals
Marion Zinderstein (USA); Vincent Richards (USA)	6	6
Kea Bouman (NED); Hendrik Timmer (NED)	3	0
Hazel Hotchkiss Wightman (USA); R. Norris Williams (USA)	2	8	6
Kathleen McKane Godfree (GBR); Brian Gilbert (GBR)	6	6	1

Final (gold-medal match)
Marion Zinderstein (USA); Vincent Richards (USA)	2	3
Hazel Hotchkiss Wightman (USA); R. Norris Williams (USA)	6	6
Bronze-medal match
Kea Bouman (NED); Hendrik Timmer (NED)
Kathleen McKane Godfree (GBR); Brian Gilbert (GBR)	w/o

=== Top half ===
First round
M Zinderstein (USA); V Richards (USA)	6	6
M Broquedis (FRA); J Borotra (FRA)	3	1
M Dupont (BEL); J Washer (BEL)	6	3	3
M Mallory (NOR); J Nielsen (NOR)	1	6	6
R Blair-White (IRL); W Ireland (IRL)	2	4
P Covell (GBR); L Godfree (GBR)	6	6
R le Gallais (LUX); C Wolff (LUX)	w/o
H Contostavlos (GRE); P Papadopoulos (GRE)
I Péteri (HUN); A von Kelemen (HUN)
R Gagliardi (ITA); R Sabbadini (ITA)	w/o
K Bouman (NED); H Timmer (NED)	6	6
L von Essen (SWE); C Wennergren (SWE)	4	4

Second round
E Álvarez (ESP); E Flaquer (ESP)
M Tata (IND); M Sleem (IND)	w/o
M Zinderstein (USA); V Richards (USA)	6	6
M Mallory (NOR); J Nielsen (NOR)	3	2
P Covell (GBR); L Godfree (GBR)
H Contostavlos (GRE); P Papadopoulos (GRE)	w/o
I Péteri (HUN); A von Kelemen (HUN)	4	2
K Bouman (NED); H Timmer (NED)	6	6

Quarterfinals
E Álvarez (ESP); E Flaquer (ESP)	3	0
M Zinderstein (USA); V Richards (USA)	6	6
P Covell (GBR); L Godfree (GBR)	1	5
K Bouman (NED); H Timmer (NED)	6	7

Semifinals
M Zinderstein (USA); V Richards (USA)	6	6
K Bouman (NED); H Timmer (NED)	3	0

=== Bottom half ===
First round
A de Borman (BEL); S Halot (BEL)	6	6
E Brehm (DEN); E Tegner (DEN)	2	4
M Krencsey (HUN); B von Kehrling (HUN)	w/o
S Fick (SWE); H Müller (SWE)
C Dahl (NOR); C Langaard (NOR)	6	2	2
L Valaoritou-Skaramaga (GRE); A Zerlendis (GRE)	4	6	6
H Wightman (USA); R Williams (USA)
S Lenglen (FRA); H Cochet (FRA)	w/o
G Perelli (ITA); U de Morpurgo (ITA)	6	10
R Torras (ESP); R Saprissa (ESP)	3	8

Second round
A de Borman (BEL); S Halot (BEL)	0	3
S Fick (SWE); H Müller (SWE)	6	6
L Valaoritou-Skaramaga (GRE); A Zerlendis (GRE)	2	1
H Wightman (USA); R Williams (USA)	6	6
G Perelli (ITA); U de Morpurgo (ITA)	7	6	5
K McKane (GBR); J Gilbert (GBR)	9	1	7
N Polley (IND); S Jacob (IND)	7	6	7
M Wallis (IRL); E McCrea (IRL)	9	4	9

Quarterfinals
S Fick (SWE); H Müller (SWE)	6	2
H Wightman (USA); R Williams (USA)	8	6
K McKane (GBR); J Gilbert (GBR)	6	7
M Wallis (IRL); E McCrea (IRL)	1	5

Semifinals
H Wightman (USA); R Williams (USA)	2	8	6
K McKane (GBR); J Gilbert (GBR)	6	6	1

== Sources ==
- ITF, 2008 Olympic Tennis Event Media Guide
- M. Avé, Comité Olympique Français (ed.). Les Jeux de la VIII^{e} Olympiade Paris 1924 – Rapport Officiel (PDF) (in French). Paris: Librairie de France. pp. 379–384. Archived (PDF) from the original on 5 May 2011.
- Wudarski, Pawel (1999). "Wyniki Igrzysk Olimpijskich" (in Polish).
