= India at the 1924 Summer Olympics =

- Flag of India
- IOC code: IND
- NOC: All India Olympic Committee

in Paris
- Competitors: 13 in 2 sports
- Medals: Gold 0 Silver 0 Bronze 0 Total 0

Summer Olympics appearances (overview)
- 1900; 1904–1912; 1920; 1924; 1928; 1932; 1936; 1948; 1952; 1956; 1960; 1964; 1968; 1972; 1976; 1980; 1984; 1988; 1992; 1996; 2000; 2004; 2008; 2012; 2016; 2020; 2024

India competed at the 1924 Summer Olympics in Paris, France. It was the country's third participation in the Summer Olympics its debut at the 1900 Summer Olympics. The Indian team consisted of 13 athletes and competed in two sports. Nora Polley became the first woman athlete to represent India at the Summer Olympics. India competed in the tennis event for the first time in the history of the Games.

== Background ==
India competed in the 1924 Summer Olympics held in Paris, France. It was the country's third participation in the Summer Olympics after its debut in the 1900 Summer Olympics. The Indian team consisted of 13 athletes including woman athlete Nora Polley. This was the first time India sent a woman athlete for the Olympics.

In February 1924, the All India Olympic Games (later National Games of India) were held at Delhi to select the team for the Games. The team trained under Harry Buck, who served as the manager, at the YMCA College of Physical Education at Madras, where Buck was the founding principal.

== Competitors ==
There were 13 athletes who took part in two sports.

Competitors representing India
Sport	Men	Women	Total
Athletics	7	0	7
Tennis	5	1	6
Total	12	1	13

== Athletics ==
Seven athletes represented India at the athletics event in the 1924 Games.

Track Events

Athlete	Event	Heats		Quarterfinals		Semifinals		Final	
Athlete	Event	Result	Rank	Result	Rank	Result	Rank	Result	Rank
James Hall	100 m	11.3	3	Did not advance					
James Hall	200 m	22.5	4	Did not advance					
Wilfred Hildreth	100 m	Unknown	4	Did not advance					
Wilfred Hildreth	200 m	Unknown	4	Did not advance					
C. K. Lakshmanan	110 m hurdles	—N/a		16.4	5	Did not advance			
Terence Pitt	100 m	Unknown	3	Did not advance					
Terence Pitt	200 m	Unknown	3	Did not advance					
Terence Pitt	400 m	49.8	1 Q	51.6	4	Did not advance			
Pala Singh	1500 m	—N/a				Unknown	6	Did not advance	
Pala Singh	5000 m	—N/a				Unknown	10	Did not advance	
Pala Singh	10000 m	—N/a				Did not finish		Did not advance	
Mahadeo Singh	Marathon	—N/a						3:37:36.0	29

Note: Ranks given are within the heat.

Field Events

Athlete	Event	Qualification		Final	
Athlete	Event	Distance	Position	Distance	Position
Dalip Singh	Long Jump	6.635	3	Did not advance	

== Tennis ==
Six athletes, including a women, represented India at the tennis event in the 1924 Games.

Men

Athlete	Event	Round of 128	Round of 64	Round of 32	Round of 16	Quarterfinals	Semifinals	Final	
Athlete	Event	Opposition Score	Opposition Score	Opposition Score	Opposition Score	Opposition Score	Opposition Score	Opposition Score	Rank
Athar Fyzee	Singles	Langaard (NOR); W 6–2, 6–2, 6–3	Zerlentis (GRE); L 3–6, 6–1, 6–3, 3–6, 4–6	Did not advance					
Syed Mohammad Hadi	Singles	Bye	Williams (USA); L 0–6, 2–6, 1–6	Did not advance					
Sydney Jacob	Singles	Morales (ESP); W 6–2, 6–4, 6–4	Ferrier (SUI); W 5–7, 6–3, 6–1, 6–1	Willard (AUS); W 6–1, 6–2, 3–6, 2–6, 6–3	Washburn (USA); W 6–1, 6–4, 8–10, 6–2	Borotra (FRA); L 6–4, 4–6, 5–7, 3–6	Did not advance		
Mohammed Sleem	Singles	Bye	van der Feen (NED); W 6–4, 6–1, 6–4	Richards (USA); L 6–8, 6–2, 4–6, 6–4, 2–6	Did not advance				
Sydney Jacob; Mohammed Sleem	Doubles	—N/a	Tegner / Ulrich (DEN); L 3–6, 4–6, 6–4, 4–6	Did not advance					
Syed Mohammad Hadi; Donald Rutnam	Doubles	—N/a	Bye	Langaard / Nielsen (NOR); W 6–2, 6–3, 6–0	Colombo / Sabbadini (ITA); W w/o	Borotra / Lacoste (FRA); L 2–6, 2–6, 3–6	Did not advance		

Women

Athlete	Event	Round of 64	Round of 32	Round of 16	Quarterfinals	Semifinals	Final	
Athlete	Event	Opposition Score	Opposition Score	Opposition Score	Opposition Score	Opposition Score	Opposition Score	Rank
Nora Polley	Singles	Bye	Valaoritou-Skaramaga (GRE); L 6–1, 3–6, 2–6	Did not advance				

Mixed

Athlete	Event	Round of 32	Round of 16	Quarterfinals	Semifinals	Final	
Athlete	Event	Opposition Score	Opposition Score	Opposition Score	Opposition Score	Opposition Score	Rank
Sydney Jacob; Nora Polley	Doubles	Bye	Wallis / McCrea (IRL); L 7–9, 6–4, 7–9	Did not advance			
