= List of Indian tennis players at the Summer Olympics =

This is a list of Indian tennis players who have represented the country at the Summer Olympics with the performance of each athlete listed.

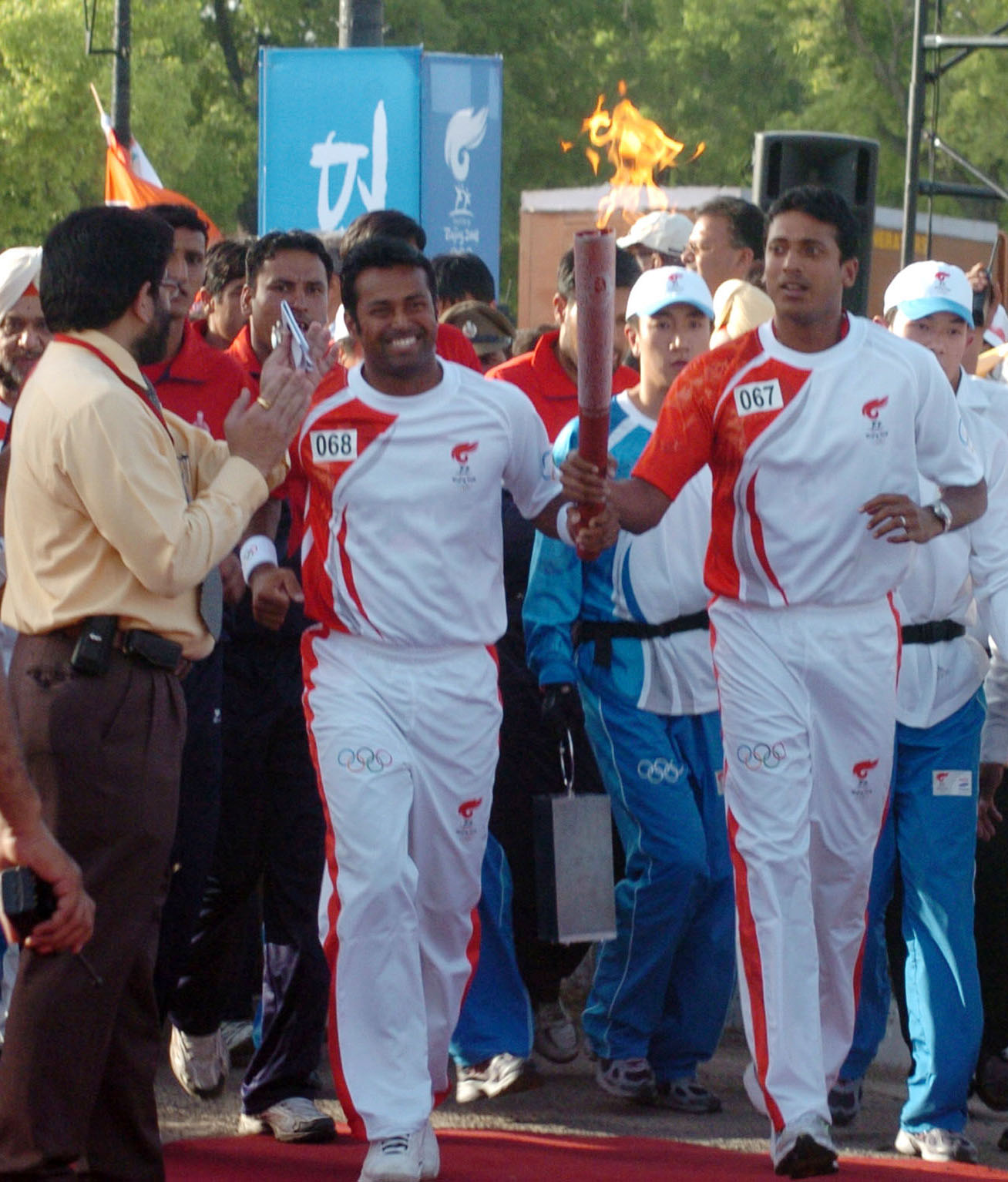
Indian tennis players Leander Paes and Mahesh Bhupati holding the 2008 Beijing Summer Olympics Torch during the Relay, at Rajpath, in New Delhi on April 17, 2008

== 1924 – Paris ==
- Men's Singles:
  - Sydney Jacob – Lost in the quarterfinals
  - Athar Fyzee – Lost in the second round
  - Mohammed Sleem – Lost in the third round
  - Syed Mohammad Hadi – Lost in the second round
- Women's Singles:
  - Nora Polley – Lost in the second round
- Men's Doubles:
  - Syed Mohammad Hadi / Donald Rutnam – Lost in the quarterfinals
  - Sydney Jacob / Mohammed Sleem – Lost in the first round
- Mixed Doubles:
  - Sydney Jacob / Nora Polley – Lost in the second round
  - Mohammed Sleem / Mehri Tata – walkover loss in second round

== 1988 – Seoul ==
- Men's Singles:
  - Zeeshan Ali – Lost in the second round
  - Vijay Amritraj – Lost in the first round

== 1992 – Barcelona ==
- Men's Singles:
  - Leander Paes – Lost in the first round
  - Ramesh Krishnan – Lost in the first round
- Men's Doubles:
  - Leander Paes / Ramesh Krishnan – Lost in the quarterfinals

== 1996 – Atlanta ==
- Men's Singles:
  - Leander Paes – bronze medal
- Men's Doubles:
  - Mahesh Bhupathi / Leander Paes – Lost in the second round

== 2000 – Sydney ==
- Men's Singles:
  - Leander Paes – Lost in the first round
- Men's Doubles:
  - Leander Paes / Mahesh Bhupathi – Lost in the second round
- Women's Doubles:
  - Manisha Malhotra / Nirupama Vaidyanathan – Lost in the first round

== 2004 – Athens ==
- Men's Doubles:
  - Mahesh Bhupathi / Leander Paes – fourth place

== 2008 – Beijing ==
- Men's Doubles:
  - Mahesh Bhupathi / Leander Paes – Lost in the quarterfinals
- Women's Singles:
  - Sania Mirza – Lost in the first round (retired)
- Women's Outdoor Doubles:
  - Sania Mirza / Sunitha Rao – Lost in the second round

== 2012 – London ==
- Men's Singles:
  - Somdev Devvarman – Lost in the first round
  - Vishnu Vardhan – Lost in the first round
- Men's Doubles:
  - Mahesh Bhupathi / Rohan Bopanna – Lost in the second round
  - Leander Paes / Vishnu Vardhan – Lost in the second round
- Women's Doubles:
  - Rushmi Chakravarthi / Sania Mirza – Lost in the first round
- Mixed Doubles:
  - Leander Paes / Sania Mirza – Lost in the quarterfinals

== 2016 – Rio de Janeiro ==
- Men's Outdoor Doubles:
  - Rohan Bopanna / Leander Paes – Lost in the first round
- Women's Doubles:
  - Sania Mirza / Prarthana Thombare – Lost in the first round
- Mixed Doubles:
  - Sania Mirza / Rohan Bopanna – fourth place

== 2020 – Tokyo ==
- Men's Singles:
  - Sumit Nagal – Lost in the second round
- Women's Doubles:
  - Sania Mirza / Ankita Raina – Lost in the first round

== 2024 – Paris ==
- Men's Singles:
  - Sumit Nagal – Lost in the first round
- Men's Doubles:
  - Rohan Bopanna / Sriram Balaji – Lost in the first round
