= 1929–30 FAI Cup =

Tournament details
- Country: Republic of Ireland

Final positions
- Champions: Shamrock Rovers (3rd title)

Tournament statistics
- Matches played: 22
- Goals scored: 82 (3.73 per match)

The FAI Cup 1929/30^{[A]} was the ninth edition of Ireland's premier cup competition, The Football Association of Ireland Challenge Cup or FAI Cup. The tournament began on 4 January 1930 and concluded on 17 March with the final held at Dalymount Park, Dublin. An official attendance^{[B]} of 17,000 people watched Shamrock Rovers claim the second of five FAI Cup titles in a row by defeating Brideville with a controversial late goal.

== First round ==
Tie no	Home team	Score	Away team	!Date
1	Bray Unknowns	0–1^{[C]}	Bohemians	4 January 1930
refix^{[C]}	Bray Unknowns	3–7	Bohemians	8 January 1930
2	Shamrock Rovers	1–1	Shelbourne	4 January 1930
replay	Shelbourne	0–0	Shamrock Rovers	8 January 1930
replay(2)	Shamrock Rovers	3–1	Shelbourne	15 January 1930
3	Brideville	1–0	Waterford Celtic	5 January 1930
4	Cork Bohemians	1–2	Dundalk	5 January 1930
5	Dolphin	5–1	Mullingar Celtic	5 January 1930
6	Drumcondra	3–3	Fordsons	5 January 1930
replay	Fordsons	3–1	Drumcondra	8 January 1930
7	Glasnevin	2–1	Cahir Park	5 January 1930
8	Jacobs	3–4	St James's Gate	5 January 1930

== Second round ==
Tie no	Home team	Score	Away team	Date
1	Shamrock Rovers	4–2	St James's Gate	18 January 1930
2	Brideville	1–1	Dolphin	19 January 1930
replay	Dolphin	2–2	Brideville	22 January 1930
replay(2)	Brideville	5–1	Dolphin	29 January 1930
3	Dundalk	5–0	Glasnevin	19 January 1930
4	Fordsons	1–0	Bohemians	19 January 1930

== Semi-finals ==
1 February 1930

Brideville	2–1	Dundalk
Gaskins; Patton(o.g.)		Patton

Shelbourne Park, Dublin

16 February 1930

Fordsons	2–2	Shamrock Rovers
T. Dickson(2)		Byrne; Fullam

The Mardyke, Cork

=== Replay ===
2 March 1930

Shamrock Rovers	3–0	Fordsons
Flood; Golding; Sloan

Iveagh Grounds, Crumlin, Dublin

== Final ==
17 March 1930

Shamrock Rovers	1–0	Brideville
Byrne 90'

Dalymount Park, Dublin
Attendance: 17,000

Winner of FAI Cup 1929–30
Shamrock Rovers
3rd Title

== Notes ==
A. From 1923 to 1936, the FAI Cup was known as the Free State Cup.

B. Attendances were calculated using gate receipts which limited their accuracy as a large proportion of people, particularly children, attended football matches in Ireland throughout the 20th century for free by a number of means.

C. ^{a} Fixture abandoned due to bad weather. Re-Fixture played on 8 January.
