= Tennis at the 1924 Summer Olympics – Women's singles =

Tennis at the Olympics

Women's singles at the Games of the VIII Olympiad
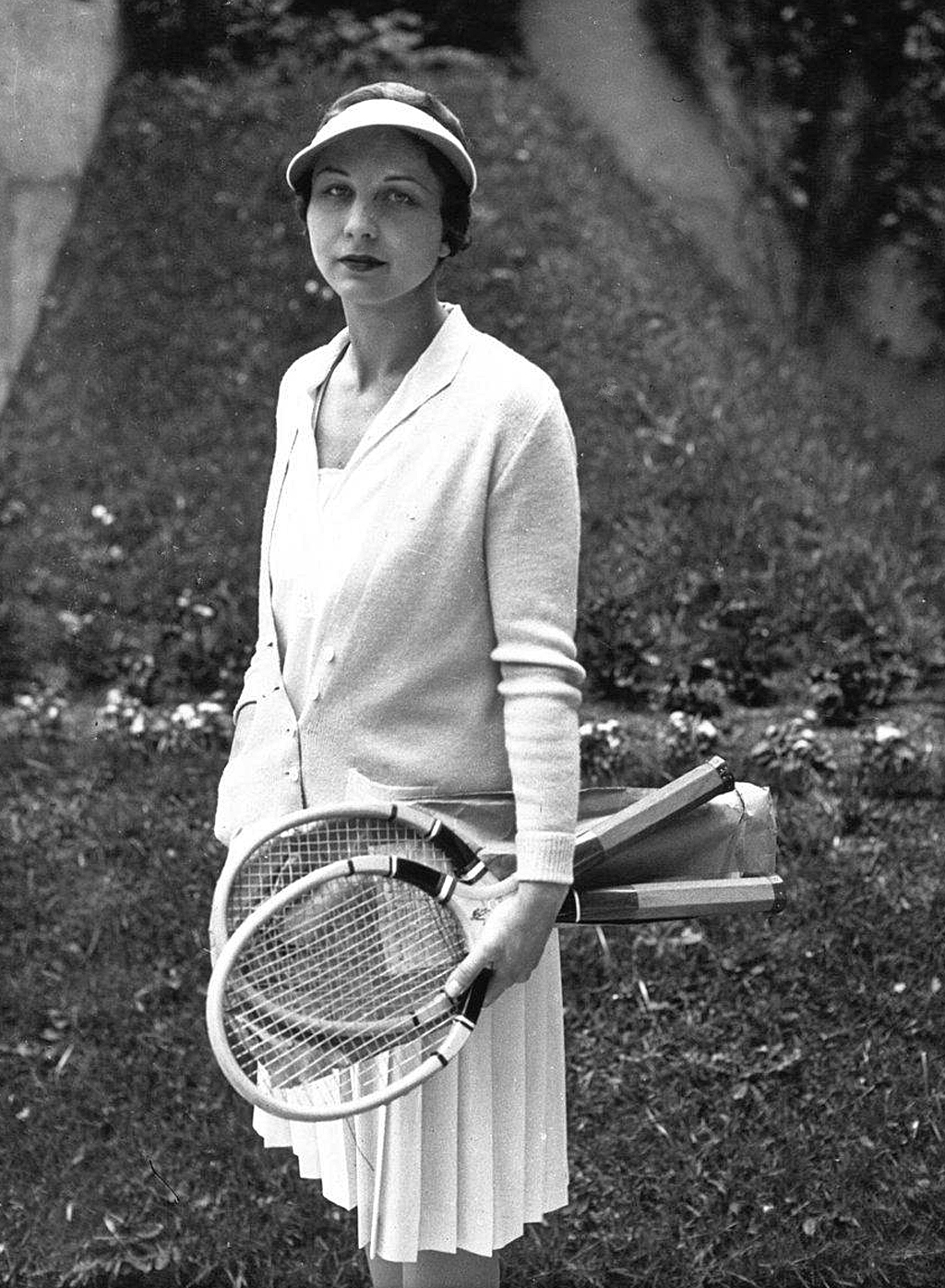
- Gold medalist Helen Wills (1932)
- Venue: Stade Olympique Yves-du-Manoir
- Dates: 13–20 July 1924
- Competitors: 31 from 14 nations

Medalists
1st place, gold medalist(s)		Helen Wills; United States
2nd place, silver medalist(s)		Julie Vlasto; France
3rd place, bronze medalist(s)		Kathleen McKane Godfree; Great Britain

Women's singles
- Tennis at the 1924 Summer Olympics

Events
Singles	men	women
Doubles	men	women	mixed
- Summer Olympics

The women's singles tennis competition was one of five tennis events at the 1924 Summer Olympics. It was held from 13 to 20 July at the Stade Olympique Yves-du-Manoir. There were 31 competitors from 14 nations (after 7 withdrawals). The event was won by Helen Wills of the United States, the first American victory in the women's singles. Julie Vlasto of France took silver. Kathleen McKane Godfree of Great Britain repeated as bronze medalist.

== Background ==
This was the fifth appearance of the women's singles tennis. A women's event was held only once during the first three Games (only men's tennis was played in 1896 and 1904), but has been held at every Olympics for which there was a tennis tournament since 1908. Tennis was not a medal sport from 1928 to 1984, though there were demonstration events in 1968 and 1984.

France's Suzanne Lenglen was the reigning Olympic champion and the dominant player of the time; however, she was ill (battling jaundice) and could not compete in front of the home crowd. American Helen Wills (who would go on to replace Lenglen as the dominant women's player and win 19 total singles Grand Slam titles) was 18 at the time and had played in three Grand Slam tournaments to date, reaching the finals in all three (and winning the 1923 U.S. championship). Julie Vlasto was the top French player in Lenglen's absence.

Greece, Hungary, India, Ireland, the Netherlands, and Spain each made their debut in the event. France and Great Britain each made their fourth appearance, tied for most among nations to that point.

== Competition format ==
The competition was a single-elimination tournament with a bronze-medal match. All matches were best-of-three sets.

== Schedule ==
Date	Time	Round
Sunday, 13 July 1924		Round of 64
Monday, 14 July 1924		Round of 64; Round of 32
Tuesday, 15 July 1924		Round of 32; Round of 16
Wednesday, 16 July 1924		Round of 16
Thursday, 17 July 1924		Quarterfinals
Friday, 18 July 1924		Semifinals
Sunday, 20 July 1924		Bronze medal match Final

== Draw ==
Key

- Q = Qualifier
- WC = Wild card
- LL = Lucky loser
- Alt = Alternate
- ITF = ITF entry
- PR = Protected ranking
- SR = Special ranking
- SE = Special exempt
- JE = Junior exempt
- JR = Junior Accelerator Programme entrant
- CO = College Accelerator Programme entrant
- NG = Next Gen Accelerator Program entrant
- w/o = Walkover
- r = Retired
- d = Defaulted

=== Finals ===
Quarterfinals
Helen Wills (USA)	6	6
Molla Mallory (NOR)	2	3
Lilí Álvarez (ESP)	5	3
Germaine Golding (FRA)	7	6
Dorothy Shepherd-Barron (GBR)	4	2
Julie Vlasto (FRA)	6	6
Marion Jessup (USA)	2	0
Kathleen McKane (GBR)	6	6

Semifinals
Helen Wills (USA)	6	6
Germaine Golding (FRA)	2	1
Julie Vlasto (FRA)	0	7	6
Kathleen McKane (GBR)	6	5	1

Final (gold-medal match)
Helen Wills (USA)	6	6
Julie Vlasto (FRA)	2	2
Bronze-medal match
Germaine Golding (FRA)	7	3	0
Kathleen McKane (GBR)	5	6	6

=== Top half ===
==== Section 1 ====
First round

Second round
ML Marnet (ESP)	w/o
H Wills (USA)
M Forlanini (ITA)	w/o
P Satterthwaite (GBR)
K Bouman (NED)	8	6
M Dupont (BEL)	6	4
M Mallory (NOR)	6	6
J Vaussard (FRA)	2	3

Third round
H Wills (USA)	6	6
P Satterthwaite (GBR)	1	1
K Bouman (NED)	7	0
M Mallory (NOR)	9	6

Quarterfinals
H Wills (USA)	6	6
M Mallory (NOR)	2	3

==== Section 2 ====
First round
A Golding (FRA)	6	6
L von Essen (SWE)	4	2
M Janssen (BEL)	4	1
I Váradi (HUN)	6	6
P Covell (GBR)	3	6	6
M Wallis (IRL)	6	0	2

Second round
N Polley (IND)	1	6	6
L Valaoritou-Skaramaga (GRE)	6	3	2
L Scharman (USA)	2	2
E Álvarez (ESP)	6	6
P Bologna (ITA)	0	3
A Golding (FRA)	6	6
I Váradi (HUN)	1	3
P Covell (GBR)	6	6

Third round
N Polley (IND)	0	3
E Álvarez (ESP)	6	6
A Golding (FRA)	6	3	6
P Covell (GBR)	3	6	2

Quarterfinals
E Álvarez (ESP)	5	3
A Golding (FRA)	7	6

=== Bottom half ===
==== Section 3 ====
First round
R Gagliardi (ITA)	6	6
E Brehm (DEN)	0	2
R Blair-White (IRL)
R le Gallais (LUX)	w/o
D Shepherd-Barron (GBR)
I Fonrodona (ESP)	w/o

Second round
R Gagliardi (ITA)	4	7	6
R Blair-White (IRL)	6	5	2
D Shepherd-Barron (GBR)	6	6
M Storms (BEL)	1	1
H Contostavlos (GRE)	w/o
E Goss (USA)
J Vlasto (FRA)	6	6
C Dahl (NOR)	1	0

Third round
R Gagliardi (ITA)	1	0
D Shepherd-Barron (GBR)	6	6
E Goss (USA)	3	6	4
J Vlasto (FRA)	6	2	6

Quarterfinals
D Shepherd-Barron (GBR)	4	2
J Vlasto (FRA)	6	6

==== Section 4 ====
First round

Second round
R Torras (ESP)	6	4	8
G Perelli (ITA)	4	6	6
M Jessup (USA)
S Lenglen (FRA)	w/o
M Krencsey (HUN)	w/o
S Fick (SWE)
A de Borman (BEL)	0	2
K McKane (GBR)	6	6

Third round
R Torras (ESP)	2	0
M Jessup (USA)	6	6
S Fick (SWE)	1	1
K McKane (GBR)	6	6

Quarterfinals
M Jessup (USA)	2	0
K McKane (GBR)	6	6

== Sources ==
- ITF, 2008 Olympic Tennis Event Media Guide
- M. Avé, Comité Olympique Français (ed.). Les Jeux de la VIII^{e} Olympiade Paris 1924 – Rapport Officiel (PDF) (in French). Paris: Librairie de France. pp. 379–384. Archived (PDF) from the original on 5 May 2011.
- Wudarski, Pawel (1999). "Wyniki Igrzysk Olimpijskich" (in Polish).
