= Charlie Dowdall =

Irish footballer (1898–1987)

Personal information
- Date of birth: 7 April 1898
- Place of birth: Dublin, Ireland
- Date of death: 7 November 1987 (aged 89)
- Place of death: Dublin, Ireland
- Position: Inside right

Senior career*
Years	Team	Apps	(Gls)
- St James's Gate
- Fordsons
- Barnsley
	Swindon Town	8	(2)
- St James's Gate
- Cork F.C.
- St James's Gate

International career
1924–1931	Ireland	5	(0)
- * Club domestic league appearances and goals

Charles Dowdall (7 April 1898 – 7 November 1987) was an Irish footballer. He played for several clubs in both the League of Ireland and the English League and was also capped at international level by Ireland. He was born in Dublin.

== Club career ==
In 1922, Dowdall was a member of the St James's Gate team that won the first ever League of Ireland title and the first ever FAI Cup. During the FAI Cup final against Shamrock Rovers, his skirmishes with Bob Fullam helped provoke post-match disturbances involving players and supporters. Together with Paddy Duncan, Thomas Murphy, Ernest MacKay and Michael Farrell, Dowdall was one of five players from St James's Gate, included in the Irish Free State squad for the 1924 Olympic Games.

After a spell with Fordsons, Dowdall played for both Barnsley and Swindon Town in the English League. He made his debut for Swindon on 1 March 1930, scoring in a 3–3 away draw with Northampton Town. However, he only made 8 league appearances for the club. He scored again, against Watford in 3–1 home defeat on 18 April, before making his final appearance on 21 April in 4–1 away defeat against the same opponents.

== Irish international ==
Between 1924 and 1931, Dowdall made 5 appearances for the Irish Free State. Although he was included in the squad that competed at the 1924 Olympic Games he did not get a game. However, after the Irish were knocked out of the competition, they arranged to play a friendly with Estonia on 3 June at the Stade Olympique. Dowdall subsequently made his international debut in this 3–1 win. On 14 June 1924, he also played against the United States in another 3–1 win at Dalymount Park. In March 1926, he travelled with the Irish squad to play Italy, but once again did not play. He did, however, play twice against Belgium in 1928 and 1929 before winning his last cap on 26 April 1931 in a 1–1 draw with Spain at the Montjuic Stadium.

== Honours ==
St James's Gate

- League of Ireland
  - Winners 1921–22: 1
- FAI Cup
  - Winners 1922: 1
