= Paddy Duncan =

Irish footballer

Personal information
- Date of birth: 1894
- Place of birth: Ireland
- Date of death: 9 April 1949 (aged 54–55)
- Position: Forward

Senior career*
Years	Team	Apps	(Gls)
1910-1928	St James's Gate		

International career
1924	Ireland	4	(2)
- * Club domestic league appearances and goals

Paddy Duncan (1894 – 9 April 1949) was an Irish footballer. At the 1924 Olympic Games he scored the Ireland (FAI)'s first ever goal in a senior international.

== Club career ==
Duncan began his schoolboy career with Belview Boys before joining St James's Gate in the 1910-11 season. During his career Duncan was known by the nickname Dirty Duncan. Together with Charlie Dowdall, Thomas Murphy, Ernest McKay and Michael Farrell, Duncan was one of five players from St James's Gate, included in the Irish Free State squad for the 1924 Olympic Games. Duncan's League of Ireland career was ended by injury in 1928 and a testimonial game was arranged for his benefit between Bohemians and a League of Ireland Selection in Dalymount Park in April 1928.

== Irish international ==
In 1924 Duncan made 4 appearances and scored 2 goals for the Irish Free State. The first two of these games were played at the 1924 Olympic Games. Other members of Olympic squad included Tommy Muldoon, Joe Kendrick, Jack McCarthy, Johnny Murray and Dinny Hannon. Duncan made his debut for the Free State in their first ever senior international on 28 May. He also scored the only goal in a 1–0 win at the Stade Olympique against Bulgaria. As a result of this win the Irish Free State qualified for the quarter-finals. On 2 June Duncan also played in this game against the Netherlands but the Irish Free State lost 2-1 after extra-time. The following day, before returning home, the team played Estonia in a friendly at the Stade Olympique and Duncan scored the opening goal in a 3–1 win.

On 14 June 1924 he also played against the United States in another 3–1 win at Dalymount Park. In March 1926 he travelled as a reserve with the Irish squad to play Italy, but did not play.

== Honours ==
St James's Gate

- League of Ireland
  - Winners 1921–22: 1
- FAI Cup
  - Winners 1922: 1
