= Italian Tennis Championships =

- Sport: Tennis
- Founded: 1895
- Country: Italy
- Most titles: Fausto Gardini, Nicola Pietrangeli, Corrado Barazzutti 7 single titles (men); Lea Pericoli 10 single titles (women)
- Website: Federtennis.it

The Italian Tennis Championships (Italian: Campionati italiani assoluti di tennis) also known as the Italian National Championships are the national championships in tennis, organised every year by the Federazione Italiana Tennis Padel (FITP) from 1895 to 2004 and in 2020.

Not disputed for 15 editions from 2005 to 2019, its come back in 2020.

== Winners ==
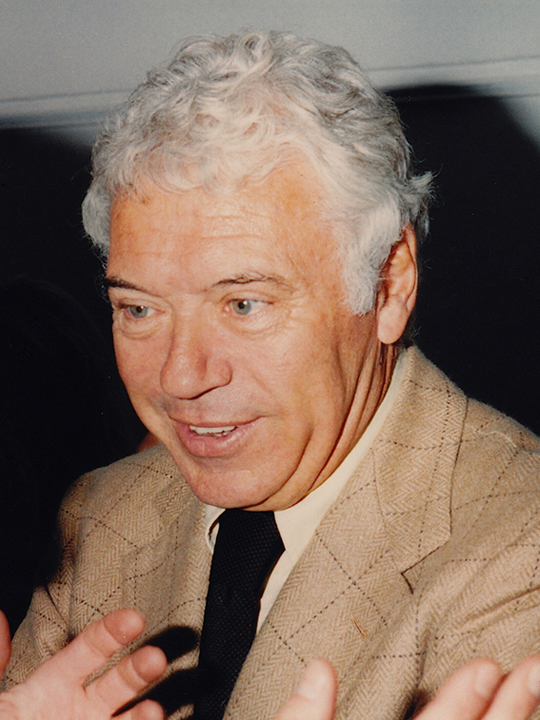
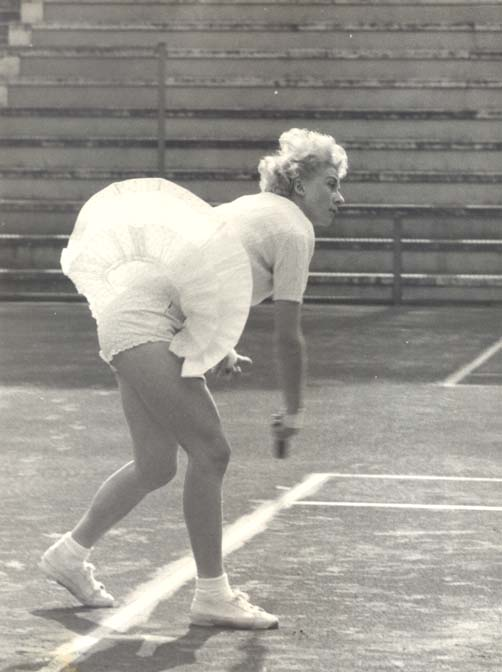
Nicola Pietrangeli and Lea Pericoli, the most winners.

| anno | Men's singles | Women's singles | Men's doubles | Women's doubles | Mixed doubles |
|---|---|---|---|---|---|
| 1895 | G. De Martino | | G. De Martino - U. De Martino | | |
| 1896 | L. De Minerbi | | | | |
| 1897 | L. De Minerbi | | | | |
| 1898 | L. De Minerbi | | | | |
| 1911 | G. De Martino | | | | |
| 1912 | Suzzi | | | | |
| 1913 | Suzzi | R. De Bellegarde | Colombo - Suzzi | | R. De Bellegarde - Suzzi |
| 1914 | Balbi | R. De Bellegarde | Balbi - R. Sabbadini | | Perelli - Prouse |
| 1919 | Colombo | Gagliardi | Colombo - Suzzi | | Perelli - Colombo |
| 1920 | R. Sabbadini | Gagliardi | Balbi - R. Sabbadini | | Perelli - Colombo |
| 1921 | Balbi | Gagliardi | Balbi - Colombo | | Gagliardi - Sabbadini |
| 1922 | Colombo | Gagliardi | Balbi - Colombo | | Gagliardi - Sabbadini |
| 1923 | R. Sabbadini | Perelli | R. Sabbadini - C. Serventi | Gagliardi - Sabbadini | Gagliardi - Sabbadini |
| 1924 | C. Serventi | Gagliardi | A. Serventi - C. Serventi | Antra - Gagliardi | Gagliardi - Gaslini |
| 1925 | D'Avalos | Perelli | D'Avalos - C. Serventi | Macquay - Macquay | Perelli - Colombo |
| 1926 | Balbi | Valerio | Balbi - Gaslini | | Valerio - Bonzi |
| 1927 | Balbi | Valerio | Del Bono - De Minerbi | Perelli - V. Valerio | Valerio - D'Avalos |
| 1928 | Sertorio | Valerio | De Martino - De Martino | Gagliardi - Luzzatti | Perelli - J. De Martino |
| 1929 | C. Serventi | Valerio | Bonzi - C. Serventi | | Valerio - Bonzi |
| 1930 | De Stefani | Valerio | De Martino - De Martino | | Valerio - De Stefani |
| 1931 | O. De Minerbi | Valerio | Gaslini - Sertorio | Gagliardi - Luzzatti | Valerio - Gaslini |
| 1932 | Palmieri | Valerio | Palmieri - Rado | Gagliardi - Luzzatti | Valerio - Gaslini |
| 1933 | Palmieri | Valerio | Quintavalle - Taroni | Luzzatti - Riboli | Luzzatti - Palmieri |
| 1934 | Palmieri | Valerio | Cesura - Del Bono | Luzzatti - Orlandini | Luzzatti - Palmieri |
| 1935 | Palmieri | Valerio | Quintavalle - Taroni | Luzzatti - Orlandini | Orlandini - Quintavalle |
| 1936 | Palmieri | Tonolli | Quintavalle - Taroni | Luzzatti - Rosaspina | Tonolli - Quintavalle |
| 1937 | Taroni | Frisacco | Quintavalle - Taroni | Sandonnino - Tonolli | Sandonnino - Taroni |
| 1938 | Canepele | Frisacco | Cucelli - G. Vido | Sandonnino - Tonolli | Tonolli - G. Vido |
| 1939 | Canepele | Manzullo | Canepele - De Stefani | Sandonnino - Tonolli | Tonolli - Romanoni |
| 1940 | M. Del Bello | Tonolli | Cucelli - M. Del Bello | Gaviraghi - Tonolli | Tonolli - Romanoni |
| 1941 | Cucelli | Bossi | Cucelli - M. Del Bello | Bossi - Sandonnino | Aliata - M. Del Bello |
| 1942 | Romanoni | Bossi | Cucelli - M. Del Bello | Bossi - Sandonnino | Aliata - M. Del Bello |
| 1945 | Cucelli | Riboli | Cucelli - M. Del Bello | | |
| 1946 | Cucelli | Bossi | Bossi - Cucelli | Gaviraghi - Manfredi | Bossi - Bossi |
| 1947 | Cucelli | Bossi | Cucelli - Sada | Annigoni - Bologna | Migliori - Belardinelli |
| 1948 | Cucelli | Bossi | Cucelli - Sada | Manfredi - Migliori | Migliori - Belardinelli |
| 1949 | Canepele | Bossi | Belardinelli - R. Del Bello | Manfredi - Migliori | Migliori - Belardinelli |
| 1950 | R. Del Bello | Manfredi | Cucelli - M. Del Bello | Bologna - Manfredi | Migliori - Belardinelli |
| 1951 | Gardini | Migliori | Belardinelli - R. Del Bello | Bologna - Manfredi | Migliori - Belardinelli |
| 1952 | Gardini | Lazzarino | Cucelli - M. Del Bello | Bologna - Manfredi | Lazzarino - Fachini |
| 1953 | Gardini | Lazzarino | Cucelli - M. Del Bello | Manfredi - Ramorino | Tonolli - M. Del Bello |
| 1954 | Gardini | Lazzarino | Fachini - Pietrangeli | Bossi-Bellani - Migliori | Pericoli - Fachini |
| 1955 | Gardini | Migliori | Pietrangeli - Sirola | Migliori - Pericoli | Pericoli - Fachini |
| 1956 | Merlo | Lazzarino | Pietrangeli - Sirola | Bossi-Bellani - Pericoli | Migliori - Sirola |
| 1957 | Merlo | Lazzarino | Pietrangeli - Sirola | Bossi-Bellani - Pericoli | Migliori - Fachini |
| 1958 | Pietrangeli | Pericoli | Pietrangeli - Sirola | Bossi-Bellani - Pericoli | Migliori - Jacobini |
| 1959 | Pietrangeli | Lazzarino | Pietrangeli - Sirola | Migliori - Riedl | Lazzarino - Sirola |
| 1960 | Merlo | Lazzarino | Pietrangeli - Sirola | Lazzarino - Pericoli | Bassi - Jacobini |
| 1961 | Gardini | Riedl | Jacobini - Pirro | Bassi - Riedl | Gordigiani - Jacobini |
| 1962 | Gardini | Pericoli | Pietrangeli - Sirola | Lazzarino - Pericoli | Gordigiani - Pirro |
| 1963 | Merlo | Riedl | Pietrangeli - Sirola | Migliori - Riedl | Beltrame - Pirro |
| 1964 | Pietrangeli | Gordigiani | Pietrangeli - Sirola | Giorgi - Perna | Beltrame - Pirro |
| 1965 | Pietrangeli | Riedl | Pietrangeli - Sirola | Giorgi - Perna | Beltrame - Pirro |
| 1966 | Maioli | Pericoli | Maioli - Tacchini | Beltrame - Gordigiani | Beltrame - Pirro |
| 1967 | Pietrangeli | Pericoli | Pietrangeli - Tacchini | Migliori - Pericoli | Pericoli - Pietrangeli |
| 1968 | Pietrangeli | Pericoli | Pietrangeli - Tacchini | Beltrame - Giorgi | Gobbò - Fachini |
| 1969 | Pietrangeli | Riedl | Marzano - A. Panatta | Bassi - Riedl | Beltrame - Di Domenico |
| 1970 | A. Panatta | Pericoli | Maioli - Tacchini | Bassi - Pericoli | Giorgi - F. Bartoni |
| 1971 | A. Panatta | Pericoli | Maioli - Tacchini | Giorgi - Nasuelli | Pericoli - Maioli |
| 1972 | A. Panatta | Bassi | A. Panatta - Pietrangeli | Bassi - Giorgi | Pericoli - Maioli |
| 1973 | A. Panatta | Pericoli | Bertolucci - A. Panatta | Bassi - Pericoli | Bassi - Marzano |
| 1974 | A. Panatta | Pericoli | Bertolucci - A. Panatta | Bassi - Pericoli | Nasuelli - Bertolucci |
| 1975 | A. Panatta | Pericoli | Di Domenico - Vattuone | Bassi - Pericoli | Pericoli - A. Panatta |
| 1976 | Barazzutti | Porzio | Maioli - Ocleppo | Porzio - R. Vido | Rosa - Vattuone |
| 1977 | Barazzutti | Porzio | Franchitti - Marzano | Porzio - R. Vido | Nasuelli - Girardelli |
| 1978 | Barazzutti | Simmonds | Marchetti - Vattuone | Porzio - Simmonds | Nasuelli - Girardelli |
| 1979 | Barazzutti | Nasuelli | Marchetti - Vattuone | Nasuelli - Giorgi | Nasuelli - Girardelli |
| 1980 | Barazzutti | Simmonds | A. Panatta - C. Panatta | Collodel - Murgo | Ippoliti - Binaghi |
| 1981 | Barazzutti | Nesti | A. Panatta - C. Panatta | Ferrando - Porzio | Cicognani - Ricci Bitti |
| 1982 | Barazzutti | Iualè | A. Panatta - C. Panatta | Romanò - Virgintino | Villaverde - Franchitti |
| 1983 | Cancellotti | Bonsignori | Barazzutti - C. Panatta | Cecchini - Raiteri | Ippoliti - Binaghi |
| 1984 | Cancellotti | Reggi | Cierro - Zampieri | Garrone - Romanò | Murgo - De Minicis |
| 1985 | C. Panatta | Garrone | Colombo - Ocleppo | Monsignore - Romanò | |
| 1986 | Canè | Garrone | Canè - Colombo | Garrone - Nozzoli | |
| 1987 | Colombo | Golarsa | Pennisi - Restelli | Garrone - Nozzoli | |
| 1988 | Narducci | Garrone | Cierro - De Minicis | Casini - Isidori | |
| 1989 | Camporese | Mugnaini | Canè - Cancellotti | Baudone - Farina | |
| 1990 | Pistolesi | Piccolini | Beraldo - Gaudenzi | Garrone - Isidori | |
| 1991 | Cierro | Piccolini | Cierro - De Minicis | Cecchini - Garrone | |
| 1992 | Cierro | Piccolini | Valeri - Albani | Grossi - Lapi | |
| 1993 | Pescosolido | Grande | Ardinghi - Messori | Farina - Ferrando | |
| 1995 | Bruno | Lubiani | Bruno - Tieleman | Perfetti - Pizzichini | |
| 1996 | Nargiso | Farina | Bertolini - Navarra | Perfetti - Pizzichini | |
| 1997 | Pescosolido | Grande | Brandi - Messori | Grande - Lubiani | |
| 1998 | Caratti | Grande | Caratti - M. Meneschincheri | Grande - Lubiani | |
| 1999 | Pozzi | Grande | Galimberti - Nargiso | Golarsa - Indemini | |
| 2000 | Galvani | Farina | Bracciali - Nargiso | Canepa - Pizzichini | |
| 2001 | Galimberti | Garbin | | | |
| 2002 | Starace | Vierin | | | |
| 2003 | Bracciali | Brianti | | | |
| 2004 | Dell'Acqua | Sassi | | | |
| 2005 | Volandri | Schiavone | | | |
| 2006-2019 | not disputed | | | | |
| 2020 | Sonego | Paolini | | | |
