= Paddy Bermingham =

Paddy Bermingham may refer to:

- Paddy Bermingham (athlete) (1886–1959), Irish police officer and sportsman
- Paddy Bermingham (footballer) (1904–1970), Irish footballer

== See also ==
- Patrick Bermingham (c. 1460–1532), Irish judge and statesman
