= Willie Kennedy =

Irish footballer

Personal information
- Full name: William Kennedy
- Position: Midfielder

Senior career*
Years	Team	Apps	(Gls)
1931–1941	St James Gate		(0)
1941–1944	Shelbourne		(14)
1944–1945	Brideville		(5)

International career
1932–34	Republic of Ireland	3	(0)
- * Club domestic league appearances and goals

William Kennedy was an Irish footballer who played as a midfielder. He made two appearances for the Republic of Ireland national team.

== Club career ==
=== St James Gate ===
Kennedy's first appearances as a League of Ireland player were with Crumlin outfit St Jame's Gate, with whom he played for ten years. Gate were the team of St James's Gate Brewery who brew Guinness stout, among other beers.

=== Shelbourne ===
In 1941, Kennedy moved across South Dublin to play for League rivals Shelbourne, scoring six goals in his debut season as Shels finished in a third place. He would stay for three years with the Reds, scoring 14 goals and helping them to a League and Shield double in the 1943–44 season. On 16 April 1944, he played as lost the FAI Cup Final, 3–2, against Shamrock Rovers in front of 34,000 spectators at Dalymount Park. This loss cost the club a valuable treble that season.

=== Brideville ===
In 1944, now in his 13th season as a League player, Kennedy moved to Liberties based club, Brideville. At the end of the 1942–43 season, Brideville had failed to get re-elected to the League. However they returned at the beginning of Kennedy's first season with the club, 1944–45, when they replaced his old side St James's Gate who had dropped out of the League. Continuing his fine goal-scoring form, Kennedy notched five league goals that season, finishing as the club's top scorer. They finished second-last in the League but their return lasted just one season. They failed to gain re-election for the following season and were replaced by Waterford.

== International career ==
At international level, Kennedy was capped three times for the Irish Free State at senior level. He made his debut versus Holland on 8 May 1932 .

His second cap came at Dalymount Park on 24 February 25, 1934, in Ireland's historic first World Cup qualifying tie, against Belgium. Kennedy was Gate's sole representative in the team that day as 28,000 fans witnessed an entertaining 4–4 draw.

== Honours ==
St James Gate

- League of Ireland: 1939–40
- FAI Cup: 1937–38
- League of Ireland Shield: 1935–36, 1940–41
- Dublin City Cup: 1938–39
- Leinster Senior Cup: 1934–35, 1936–37, 1940–41

Shelbourne

- League of Ireland: 1943–44
- League of Ireland Shield: 1943-44
- Dublin City Cup: 1941-42
