= Ernest MacKay =

Ernest MacKay may refer to:

- Ernest John Henry Mackay (5 July 1880 – 2 October 1943) - archaeologist from Bristol
- Ernie MacKay (7 October 1896 – September 1996) - Irish footballer
