= Michael Farrell (footballer) =

Irish footballer (1900–1968)

Personal information
- Full name: Michael John Farrell
- Date of birth: 7 February 1900
- Date of death: 14 July 1968 (aged 68)

Senior career*
Years	Team	Apps	(Gls)
1923-1928	St James's Gate		

International career
1924	Ireland	3	(0)
- * Club domestic league appearances and goals

Michael John Farrell (7 February 1900 – 14 July 1968) was an Irish footballer. He competed in the men's tournament at the 1924 Summer Olympics. He died on 14 July 1968, at the age of 68.

== 1924 Olympics ==
Farrell was one of five St James's Gate players selected for the Irish Free State team at the Paris Olympics. Others included Paddy Duncan, Tom Murphy, Charlie Dowdall, and Ernie MacKay. Farrell started Ireland's inaugural game against Bulgaria on 28 May 1924 at the Stade Olympique where his teammate Duncan would score the only goal to secure a historic debut win for the Irish Free State. Farrell himself hit the woodwork during the tie.

Farrell started Ireland's next match against the Netherlands in the tournament Quarter-Finals at the Stade de Paris on 2 June 1924. Ireland would lose the game 2-1 after Dutch forward Ok Formenoy settled the tie with a strike in the 104th minute of play.

Ireland would end their time in France by playing Estonia in a friendly at the Stade Olympique, winning 3–1. However, Farrell didn't play in this match. He made one further appearance in an international friendly game in Dublin against United States, and this would be his last cap for Ireland.
