= Charlie Lennon =

Charlie Lennon may refer to:

- Charlie Lennon (Irish footballer) (fl. 1934–1939), Republic of Ireland international footballer
- Charlie Lennon (English footballer) (born 2006)
- Charlie Lennon (fiddler) (1938–2024), Irish traditional musician
