= 1938–39 League of Ireland =

League of Ireland
- Season: 1938–39
- Champions: Shamrock Rovers (6th title)
- Matches: 132
- Goals: 525 (3.98 per match)
- Top goalscorer: Patrick Bradshaw (22 goals)

The 1938–39 League of Ireland was the eighteenth season of the League of Ireland. Shamrock Rovers were the defending champions.

Shamrock Rovers won their sixth title, and in doing so, became the first team to successfully defend their title.

== Overview ==
Cork folded during the previous season, with Cork City taking their place.

== Teams ==
Locations of the 1937–38 League of Ireland teams

Team	Location	Stadium
Bohemians	Dublin (Phibsborough)	Dalymount Park
Bray Unknowns	Bray	Carlisle Grounds
Brideville	Dublin (The Liberties)	Harold's Cross Stadium
Cork City	Cork	Mardyke
Drumcondra	Dublin (Clonturk)	Clonturk Park
Dundalk	Dundalk	Oriel Park
Limerick	Limerick	Markets Field
St. James's Gate	Dublin (Crumlin)	St. James's Park
Shamrock Rovers	Dublin (Milltown)	Glenmalure Park
Shelbourne	Dublin (Ringsend)	Shelbourne Park
Sligo Rovers	Sligo	The Showgrounds
Waterford	Waterford	Kilcohan Park

== Table ==
Pos	Team	Pld	W	D	L	GF	GA	GD	Pts
1	Shamrock Rovers	22	16	4	2	60	32	+28	36
2	Sligo Rovers	22	10	7	5	50	31	+19	27
3	Dundalk	22	10	7	5	48	31	+17	27
4	St James's Gate	22	10	3	9	59	48	+11	23
5	Limerick	22	9	4	9	36	38	−2	22
6	Shelbourne	22	9	4	9	40	48	−8	22
7	Bohemians	22	8	4	10	41	46	−5	20
8	Drumcondra	22	6	6	10	38	45	−7	18
9	Bray Unknowns	22	7	4	11	41	49	−8	18
10	Brideville	22	6	6	10	37	49	−12	18
11	Cork City	22	7	3	12	39	49	−10	17
12	Waterford	22	4	8	10	36	59	−23	16

Source: www.rsssf.com

== Results ==
Home \ Away	BOH	BRY	BRI	COC	DRU	DUN	LIM	SHM	SHE	SLI	STG	WAT
Bohemians	—	3–2	2–2	2–1	2–3	0–2	4–2	1–3	3–0	2–2	2–0	2–3
Bray Unknowns	3–1	—	2–1	3–1	0–1	3–0	2–1	2–4	1–1	3–1	2–4	2–2
Brideville	3–2	2–2	—	2–1	2–5	2–0	2–2	3–3	5–2	1–1	3–1	2–2
Cork City	3–0	4–2	4–0	—	3–2	2–2	2–1	2–3	2–2	0–2	2–5	3–2
Drumcondra	0–1	1–4	2–1	0–1	—	3–3	1–1	1–4	0–1	1–1	3–1	2–2
Dundalk	3–2	2–1	3–0	4–1	2–2	—	4–0	0–2	5–0	1–1	1–1	5–1
Limerick	0–2	7–0	1–0	2–1	3–2	2–1	—	0–2	4–2	3–0	0–3	3–2
Shamrock Rovers	2–2	5–3	3–0	3–1	3–1	3–2	0–0	—	0–1	3–3	4–2	5–1
Shelbourne	3–0	1–0	1–0	2–1	3–4	2–2	0–2	2–3	—	3–2	3–1	4–1
Sligo Rovers	4–0	2–1	6–1	4–2	1–0	1–1	3–0	0–1	3–2	—	5–1	7–1
St James's Gate	1–1	3–1	3–5	5–1	3–3	2–3	4–1	4–2	7–3	3–0	—	4–1
Waterford	4–7	2–2	1–0	1–1	3–1	0–2	1–1	1–2	2–2	1–1	2–1	—

Legend: Blue = home team win; Yellow = draw; Red = away team win.

== Top goalscorers ==
Pos	Player	Club	Goals
1	Patrick Bradshaw	St James's Gate	22
