= Tennis at the 1924 Summer Olympics =

- Date: 13–21 July 1924
- Edition: 7th
- Surface: Clay / outdoor
- Location: Colombes
- Venue: Stade Olympique Yves-du-Manoir

Champions

Men's singles
- Vincent Richards (USA)

Women's singles
- Helen Wills (USA)

Men's doubles
- Vincent Richards / Francis Hunter (USA)

Women's doubles
- Hazel Wightman / Helen Wills (USA)

Mixed doubles
- Hazel Wightman / R. Norris Williams (USA)
- Summer Olympics

Final results of the tennis competition at the 1924 Summer Olympics in Paris, France. After the 1924 Olympics, the tennis competition would be dropped until 1988. The mixed doubles competition did not return until the 2012 Olympics.

== Schedule ==
Date	13 July		14 July		15 July		16 July	17 July	18 July	19 July	20 July	21 July
Day	Sunday		Monday		Tuesday		Wednesday	Thursday	Friday	Saturday	Sunday	Monday
Time	M	A	M	Afternoon	Morning	Afternoon	Afternoon	Afternoon	Afternoon	Afternoon	Afternoon	Afternoon
Men's singles	Elimination rounds						Round of 16	Quarterfinals	Semifinals	—	Bronze & final	—
Women's singles	—	Elimination rounds				Elimination/ round of 16	Round of 16	Quarterfinals	Semifinals	—	Bronze & final	—
Men's doubles	—	—	Elimination rounds			Elimination/round of 16		—	Quarterfinals	Semifinals	—	Bronze & final
Women's doubles	—	—	—	Elimination	—	Round of 16		Quarterfinals	Semifinals	Bronze & final	—	—
Mixed doubles	—	—	—	Elimination	Round of 16	Elimination/ round of 16	—	Round of 16	Round of 16/ quarterfinals	Quarterfinals	Semifinals	Bronze & final

== Medal summary ==
=== Events ===
Event	Gold	Silver	Bronze
Men's singles	Vincent Richards; United States	Henri Cochet; France	Uberto De Morpurgo; Italy
Men's doubles	United States; Vincent Richards; Francis Hunter	France; Jacques Brugnon; Henri Cochet	France; Jean Borotra; René Lacoste
Women's singles	Helen Wills; United States	Julie Vlasto; France	Kathleen McKane; Great Britain
Women's doubles	United States; Hazel Wightman; Helen Wills	Great Britain; Phyllis Covell; Kathleen McKane	Great Britain; Evelyn Colyer; Dorothy Shepherd-Barron
Mixed doubles	United States; Hazel Wightman; R. Norris Williams	United States; Marion Jessup; Vincent Richards	Netherlands; Kea Bouman; Hendrik Timmer

=== Medal table ===
Rank	Nation	Gold	Silver	Bronze	Total
1	United States	5	1	0	6
2	France	0	3	1	4
3	Great Britain	0	1	2	3
4	Italy	0	0	1	1
4	Netherlands	0	0	1	1
Totals (5 entries)		5	5	5	15

== Participating nations ==
There were 124 tennis players from 28 countries.

- Argentina (5)
- Australia (2)
- Belgium (8)
- Chile (2)
- Republic of China (4)
- Czechoslovakia (5)
- Denmark (5)
- Finland (4)
- France (10)
- Great Britain (10)
- Greece (3)
- Hungary (5)
- India (6)
- Ireland (4)
- Italy (8)
- Japan (4)
- Luxembourg (1)
- Mexico (2)
- Netherlands (5)
- Norway (4)
- Portugal (1)
- Romania (3)
- South Africa (4)
- Spain (8)
- Sweden (4)
- Switzerland (4)
- United States (9)
- Yugoslavia (1)
