= Cromer Covered Courts Championships =

Defunct tennis tournament
- Event name: Cromer Covered Courts Tournament
- Founded: 1925; 100 years ago
- Abolished: 1965; 60 years ago
- Location: Cromer, Norfolk, England
- Venue: Newhaven Court
- Surface: Clay – indoors

The Cromer Covered Courts Championships or simply the Cromer Covered Courts was an open men's and women's international indoor Clay tennis tournament founded in 1925. The tournament featured two editions, one was held in the autumn first known as the Cromer Covered Courts Autumn Meeting and the other in the spring. The tournaments were organised by the Cromer Covered Courts Club and held at the indoor courts at Newhaven Court, Cromer, Norfolk, England. The event ran until 1965.

== History ==
The Cromer Covered Courts was an open men's and women's international indoor clay court tennis tournament founded in 1925. The tournament featured two editions of the event. The first was held in the autumn usually in October or November, this event being the oldest of the two was known as the Cromer Covered Courts Autumn Meeting.

The second edition was started in 1934 was usually held in the spring in April. In January 1963 the Newhaven Court Hotel was destroyed by a fire. Two years later in 1965 after the blaze that destroyed the hotel, another fire destroyed the covered tennis courts in the grounds.

Previous winners of the men's singles at the Cromer covered courts spring meeting included; Mohammed Sleem, Murray Deloford, Ignacy Tłoczyński, Eric Filby and Dieter Schultheiss

Past winners of the covered courts autumn meeting included; Henry Mayes, Fred Perry, Ted Avory, Don Butler, Jack Harper, George Godsell and Władysław Skonecki.

== Venue ==
The Cromer Lawn Tennis Club was founded in 1907 and twelve grass courts were laid down on land adjacent to Norwich Road, Cromer. In 1908 the club staged its first open tournament. In August 1919 the club became the venue for the resumed Norfolk Championships. In 1925 the club had constructed two indoor courts built at Newhaven Court at a cost of £10,000 (or £777,823.40 today). In 1926 some events of the Norfolk championships were transferred indoors due to severe rain delays. The club is still operating today.
