= Harry Buck =

American sports coach

Biographical details
- Born: November 25, 1884; Liverpool, Pennsylvania, U.S.
- Died: July 24, 1943 (aged 58); Madras, Tamil Nadu, India
- Education: Springfield YMCA

Coaching career (HC unless noted)

Football
- 1914–1915: Fairmount

Basketball
- 1914–1916: Fairmount

Baseball
- 1915–1916: Fairmount

Head coaching record
- Overall: 6–8–2 (football); 14–15 (basketball); 3–9–1 (baseball)

Harry Crowe Buck (November 25, 1884 – July 24, 1943) was an American college sports coach and physical education instructor. He founded the YMCA College of Physical Education at Madras in 1920, which played a key role in promoting sports and in establishing the Olympic movement in India. He has been called "The Father of Physical Education in India". He was also one of the founding members of the Olympic movement in India and the Indian Olympic Association, and was manager of the Indian team at the 1924 Olympics.

He was also the first secretary of the Madras Olympic Association that was formed in 1924 and served as its secretary until his death in 1943.

Before his work in India, Buck was the ninth head football at Fairmount College–now known as Wichita State University—in Wichita, Kansas and he held that position for two seasons, from 1914 until 1915, compiling a record of 6–8–2.

== Head coaching record ==
=== Football ===
Year	Team	Overall	Conference	Standing	Bowl/playoffs
Fairmount Wheatshockers (Kansas Collegiate Athletic Conference) (1914–1915)
1914	Fairmount	3–3–1	3–3		
1915	Fairmount	3–5–1	2–5–1	12th	
Fairmount:		6–8–2	5–8–1		
Total:		6–8–2			
