= Paddy Bermingham (athlete) =

Irish police officer and discus thrower

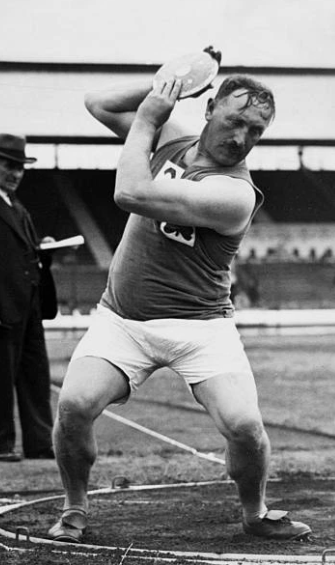
- circa 1924 at White City, possibly the AAA Championships

Personal information
- Nationality: British (Northern Irish)
- Born: 15 March 1886 Moyasta, County Clare, Ireland
- Died: 19 January 1959 (aged 72) Dublin, Ireland
- Height: 187 cm (6 ft 2 in)
- Weight: 125 kg (276 lb)

Sport
- Sport: Athletics
- Event: Discus throw
- Club: Dublin Metropolitan Police

Patrick Joseph Bermingham (15 March 1886 – January 1959) was an Irish police officer and sportsman, specialising in the discus. He was from Moyasta in County Clare and joined the Dublin Metropolitan Police.

== Biography ==
Bermingham won ten Irish national discus titles: IAAA titles in 1919 and 1920, and NACAI titles in 1923–4–5–6–7, 1930, 1932, and 1933. He held the Irish record at 151 ft 6 1/2 in (46.19 m) until 1939. At the AAA Championships he won five discus titles: 1924–5–6, 1932, and 1934. He also won four Irish titles in each of the 56 lbs weight throw events: for height (1923, 1925–6, 1929) and for distance (1923, 1925–6–7). He represented Ireland at the 1924 Summer Olympics, but was eliminated in the qualifying round of the discus competition; his longest throw would have qualified for the final six but was discounted as a foul. His best mark of 40.42 metres (132 ft 7 in) ranked him eleventh overall.

In 1930, throwing for the Dublin Metropolitan Guards, which was part of the Garda Síochána, Bermingham won the 1930 championship of the Irish Free State, the 1930 discus championship of Munster and the 1930 championship of Ireland.

He is recorded as having competed in the 1934 British Empire Games, as an Irish Free State athlete representing Northern Ireland. He finished outside the top seven.

He is buried in Mount Jerome cemetery.

Several online football databases mistakenly suggest that Bermingham also played for the Irish Free State national football team vs Hungary in 1934, but that was a different Patrick Joseph Bermingham.
