= Paddy Bradshaw =

Irish footballer

Personal information
- Full name: Patrick Joseph Bradshaw
- Date of birth: 16 March 1912
- Place of birth: Dublin, Ireland
- Date of death: 11 March 1963 (aged 50)
- Place of death: Dublin, Ireland
- Position: Forward

Senior career*
Years	Team	Apps	(Gls)
1938–1941	St James's Gate		
1941–19xx	Shelbourne		
1943–1944	St James's Gate		

International career
1938–1939	Ireland (FAI)	5	(4)
1938–1940	League of Ireland XI	3	(3)
- * Club domestic league appearances and goals

Paddy Bradshaw (16 March 1912 –11 March 1963) was an Irish footballer who played for St James's Gate and Shelbourne in the League of Ireland. Bradshaw was something of a late bloomer, making his League of Ireland debut at the age of 26, before then going onto enjoy a brief but meteoric career during the seasons approaching the Second World War. A month after making his senior league debut, he made his international debut for Ireland and went on to make 5 appearances and score 4 goals during the 1938–39 international season. He was also the top goal scorer in the League of Ireland for two consecutive seasons, helping St James's Gate win the league title in 1940.

== Club career ==
Bradshaw was born in a poor part of Dublin and left school at an early age to help supplement his family income, working mainly on the docks. His football talents soon brought him to prominence and proved a help in gaining employment. A hard, tenacious striker with a strong body swerve and great pace, he could beat defenders with ease. Despite this, he turned down offers from several clubs in the League of Ireland and from Manchester City. At the end of the 1937–38 season, at the age of 26, he was at his peak. He played for an Ireland Junior team against a Birmingham FA XI at Dalymount Park and scored a hat-trick in a 4–3 defeat. A week later, he scored again for a Leinster Senior League XI in a 2–2 draw with Motherwell. The interest in him increased and he eventually signed for St James's Gate. On his senior debut for the club in August 1938, he scored five goals in a 10–2 win against Limerick. The next two seasons saw Bradshaw finish as top goalscorer in the League of Ireland, scoring 22 goals in 1938–39 and 29 in 1939–40. Bradshaw also had a spell with Shelbourne and finished as the club's top league goalscorer with 11 goals during the 1941–42 season.

== Irish international ==
Between 1938 and 1939 Bradshaw made 5 appearances and scored 4 goals for Ireland. He made his international debut on 18 September 1938 in a 4–0 win against Switzerland at Dalymount Park. Bradshaw opened the scoring after just 20 seconds, the quickest ever goal in the history of the FAI XI, when he blocked an attempted clearance by the Swiss goalkeeper, Huber. Jimmy Dunne added a second in the 8th minute before then turning provider when his cross was headed in by Bradshaw for the third in the 20th minute. Only an outstanding second-half performance by Huber prevented Bradshaw from scoring a hat-trick. He did, however, help set-up Tommy Donnelly for Ireland's fourth goal. On 13 November 1938 Bradshaw won his second international cap as he helped Ireland to a 3–2 win against Poland, again at Dalymount Park. On 19 March 1939 in a 2–2 draw with Hungary at The Mardyke, Bradshaw scored his third international goal. He then went on a European tour with Ireland and played in the team's last two internationals before the Second World War. The first of these was a return game against Hungary on 18 May 1939 which again finished as a 2–2 draw. He made his last appearance and scored his last goal for Ireland on 23 May in a 1–1 draw with Germany.

In 1939 Bradshaw also played twice for the League of Ireland XI, helping them to 2–1 victories against an Irish League XI and a Scottish Football League XI. Playing in a team that also included Jimmy Dunne, Kevin O'Flanagan and Mick Hoy, Bradshaw scored in both games. On 28 April 1940 he scored again, while playing for a League of Ireland XI, in a 3–2 defeat against a Scottish League XI at Dalymount Park. This team also included Dunne, John Feenan and guest player, Johnny Carey.

== Honours ==
St James's Gate

- League of Ireland: 1
  - 1939–40
- League of Ireland Shield: 1
  - 1940–41
- Dublin City Cup: 1
  - 1938–39

Individual

- League of Ireland Top Scorer:
  - 1938–39, 1939–40
