= Emmet McLoughlin =

Irish footballer

Personal information
- Full name: Emmet McLoughlin
- Date of birth: 6 October 1922
- Place of birth: Ireland
- Date of death: 26 February 1988 (aged 65)
- Position: Inside right

Youth career
- Moville Celtic

Senior career*
Years	Team	Apps	(Gls)
1943	Bohemians		
1944	St James's Gate		
1944–1945	Dundalk		
1945–1946	Shelbourne		
1948	Derry City		
1948	UCD		
1948–1949	Bohemians		
1950	Derry City		
1951	Portadown		

International career
1948	Ireland	1	(0)
1951	Ireland Amateur	3	(0)
- * Club domestic league appearances and goals

Emmet McLoughlin (6 October 1922 – 26 February 1988) was an Irish amateur football player who represented Ireland at the 1948 London Olympic Games. He also represented the Ireland Amateur team selected by the IFA.

McLoughlin came from Inishowen in County Donegal and grew up in and around the towns of Moville and Carndonagh. However, some sources give his birthplace as Derry. At the time of the 1948 Olympics he was a medical student at University College Dublin and was attached to the Mater Private Hospital in Dublin. In January 1948 he played for the hospital football team in a challenge match against Belfast's Mater Infirmorum Hospital at Celtic Park. At the time of the Olympics, McLoughlin is listed as a UCD player.

On 26 July 1948 he played as an inside-right for Ireland at the 1948 Olympic Football Tournament. He featured in the 3–1 defeat against the Netherlands played at Fratton Park. Brendan O'Kelly, who scored Ireland's only goal, like McLoughlin, also played for Bohemians and UCD.

McLoughlin joined Portadown in 1951, scoring on his début against Crusaders on 27 January 1951. While at Portadown he represented the Ireland Amateur team on three occasions, played in games against England, Scotland and the Gold Coast.

McLoughlin later emigrated to England.
