= Arthur Blair-White =

Irish cricketer (1891–1975)

Personal information
- Full name: Arthur Blair-White
- Born: 3 July 1891; Monkstown, Dublin, Ireland
- Died: 29 April 1975 (aged 83); Ballindrait, Ulster, Ireland
- Batting: Right-handed

Domestic team information
- Years: Team
- 1913: Ireland

Career statistics
Competition	First-class
Matches	1
Runs scored	30
Batting average	15.00
100s/50s	–/–
Top score	23
Catches/stumpings	–/–
- Source: Cricinfo, 27 October 2021

Arthur Blair-White (3 July 1891, in County Dublin – 29 April 1975, in County Donegal) third child of Richard Blair White of Dublin and Emily Maud Nichols of New Zealand educated at Rugby School and Trinity College Dublin fought in the First World War—Croix de Guerre, Military order of the British Empire, mentioned in dispatches married Rosetta Phoebe Newell in 1919 who played tennis for Ireland—was an Irish cricketer. A right-handed batsman and occasional wicket-keeper, he played just once for Ireland, a first-class match against Scotland in July 1913.

In 1918, he married Irish tennis player Phoebe Blair-White. In the 1960s, they moved to Lifford, County Donegal, and later, they lived in Strabane County Tyrone. He is buried in Lifford, County Donegal beside his wife.
