= John O'Grady (athlete) =

Irish shot putter

Personal information
- Nationality: Irish
- Born: 17 February 1891 Ballybricken, County Limerick, Ireland
- Died: 26 November 1934 (aged 43) Limerick, Ireland

Sport
- Sport: Athletics
- Event: Shot put
- Club: Limerick AC

John Joseph O'Grady (17 February 1891 – 26 November 1934) was an Irish athlete who competed at the 1924 Summer Olympics.

== Biography ==
O'Grady was the eldest son of William and Catherine O'Grady. His mother died when he was a young child. He is buried in Kilmurry, Caherconlish, County Limerick.

He finished second behind Rex Woods in the shot put event at the British 1924 AAA Championships. Shortly afterwards he was selected for the Irish team for the 1924 Olympic Games in Paris, where he competed in the men's shot put.

He was the Irish champion in the Putting 16lb Shot in 1914, 1916, 1924 and 1925. He was the Irish champion in the Putting 28lb shot from 1913 to 1918. The Irish Champion for Pushing the 56lb in 1917 and Slinging the 56lb in 1917, 1918 and 1924.

There is a large stone monument at the end of Mulgrave street in his honor in his hometown of Limerick.
