= Brideville F.C. =

Irish association football club

Brideville
- Full name: Brideville Football Club
- Ground: Richmond Park; Harold's Cross Stadium
- League: League of Ireland; Leinster Senior League

Brideville Football Club was an Irish association football club, originally based in The Liberties, Dublin. Founded in 1919, they were active during the 1920s, 1930s and 1940s, playing in both the League of Ireland and the Leinster Senior League. They were the first ever winners of the FAI Junior Cup and also played in two FAI Cup finals.

== History ==
Chart of yearly table positions for Brideville in League of Ireland

Brideville had three spells playing in the League of Ireland, which added up to seventeen seasons in total. After winning the FAI Junior Cup and then the Leinster Senior Cup in successive seasons, Brideville made their League of Ireland debut in 1925–26. They were elected to replace Brooklyn. In 1925–26 Brideville's reserve team also won the Leinster Senior League. During their first spell in the League of Ireland, Brideville also made two FAI Cup final appearances. In 1926–27, with a team that included Fran Watters, they lost 1–0 in a replay to Drumcondra, then playing in the Leinster Senior League. In 1929–30, with a team that featured Peadar Gaskins, Joe O'Reilly and Charlie Reid, they again lost 1–0 this time to Shamrock Rovers. According to Doolan and Goggins, Brideville were unlucky not to win the 1930 final. They had created the "better chances to score" but failed to take them. Then with less than a minute to play, David Byrne, later to become a Brideville player, scored the winner. Some years later, Byrne admitted that he had actually handled the ball before scoring. At the end of the 1931–32 season Brideville failed to get re-elected to the League of Ireland. However, in 1932–33 they won the Leinster Senior League and in 1935–36 when the League of Ireland was expanded from ten teams to twelve, Brideville rejoined. The other expansion team was Reds United. In 1937–38 they achieved their best finish in the league when they finished fourth. At the end of the 1942–43 season they once again failed to get re-elected. However Brideville returned after just one season and in 1944–45 they replaced St James's Gate. However their return lasted just one season. They failed to gain re-election for the following season and were replaced by Waterford.

== Home ground ==
Between 1925 and 1930 Brideville played their home games at Richmond Park. However, in 1930 they were replaced as tenants by St Patrick's Athletic. They then moved to Harold's Cross Stadium which they shared with Dolphins. During the 1939–40 season they also played at Green Lanes.

== Honours ==
- Leinster Senior League
  - Winners: 1925–26, 1932–33: 2
- FAI Cup
  - Runners Up: 1926–27, 1929–30: 2
- Leinster Senior Cup
  - Winners: 1924-25: 1
- FAI Junior Cup: 1
  - Winners: 1923–24

== League of Ireland Stats ==
| Stat | Opponent | Score | Season | Date |
|---|---|---|---|---|
| Record Win | Bray Unknowns | 7–0 | 1935–36 | 16 February 1936 |
| Record Defeat | Cork United | 0–9 | 1944–45 | 16 December 1944 |

== Notable former players ==
=== Ireland internationals ===
The following Brideville players represented Ireland and/or the Republic of Ireland at full international level. Joe O'Reilly and Charlie Reid both played for Brideville when they were capped.

- (Republic of Ireland) Paddy Bermingham
- (Republic of Ireland) (Ireland) Ned Brooks
- (Republic of Ireland) David Byrne
- (Republic of Ireland) Willie Fallon
- (Republic of Ireland) Peadar Gaskins
- (Republic of Ireland) Joseph Golding
- (Republic of Ireland) Mick McCarthy
- (Republic of Ireland) (Ireland) Paddy Moore
- (Republic of Ireland) Joe O'Reilly
- (Republic of Ireland) Charlie Reid
- (Republic of Ireland) Fran Watters

=== Goalscorers ===
- Top League Scorer (season): 16, Patrick Quinlan (1930–31)
- Top League Scorer (total): 27, Charlie Reid (1929-32 and 1936–37)
