= John Bacon (footballer) =

Irish former footballer

Personal information
- Date of birth: 23 March 1973 (age 53)
- Place of birth: Dublin, Ireland
- Position: Striker

Youth career
- St Malachy's

Senior career*
Years	Team	Apps	(Gls)
1989–1993	Arsenal	0	(0)
1992	→ Shamrock Rovers (loan)	10	(3)
1992–1993	→ Derry City (loan)	12	(3)
1993–1995	Shamrock Rovers	23	(2)
1995–1996	St James's Gate F.C.	?	(?)
1996–1997	Ards	26	(3)

International career
1991–1993	Republic of Ireland U21	4	(0)
1991	Republic of Ireland U20	3	(0)
1988	Republic of Ireland U17	2	(2)
- * Club domestic league appearances and goals

John Bacon (born 23 March 1973) is an Irish former footballer.

== Club career ==
Bacon joined Arsenal in July 1989 and spent four years as a member of the youth side, winning a South East Counties League title in 1990-91. He was also capped four times by the Irish Under 21 team. He never made a first-team appearance, and was loaned to Shamrock Rovers in January 1992. He made his League of Ireland Premier Division debut for Rovers against Dundalk on 26 January 1992 and in total scored three times in ten league appearances that season.

After returning to Arsenal at the end of the 1991–92 League of Ireland Premier Division season Bacon went on loan to Derry City F.C. in January 1993 where he scored three goals in twelve league appearances. He was released by Arsenal on a free transfer in the 1993 close season. In July 1993 Bacon signed for The Hoops where he made eleven league appearances scoring once as the club won its fifteenth League title in the 1993/94 season.

He made two appearances in the 1994–95 UEFA Cup but in October 1994 Bacon was put on the transfer list along with six other players

For the 1995–96 season Bacon signed for St James's Gate F.C. for what turned out to be their final season in the League of Ireland.

Bacon then moved to the Irish League and signed for Ards F.C. where he scored 4 goals in 40 appearances in the 1996–97 Irish League which included 3 appearances in the 1997 UEFA Intertoto Cup.

== International career ==
Bacon represented his country at schoolboy, youths, U15, U16, U19 and at U21 level.

As an U16 international he scored twice against Northern Ireland in October 1988

He was part of the team who lost to Switzerland in the final qualifier for the 1989 UEFA European Under-16 Football Championship.

Bacon was part of the team that played at the 1991 FIFA World Youth Championship.

== Sources ==
- Paul Doolan; Robert Goggins. The Hoops. ISBN 0-7171-2121-6.
