= Ilona Váradi =

Hungarian tennis player

- Full name: Ilona (Ili) Julianna Mária•Váradi (-Pétery)
- Country (sports): Hungary
- Born: 4 August 1891; Budapest, Austria-Hungary
- Died: 19 February 1945 (aged 53)

Singles

Grand Slam singles results
- French Open: 1R (1926)

Ilona Váradi (4 August 1891 – 19 February 1945) was a Hungarian tennis player. She competed in the singles event at the 1924 Summer Olympics, winning her first round match against Marie Janssen before losing in the second round to Phyllis Covell. In the doubles event she partnered Medy Krencsey, but after a bye in the first round and a walkover in the second they defaulted from their third round match against Hazel Wightman and Helen Wills. In the mixed doubles competition she played with Aurél von Kelemen and were defeated in the third round by the Dutch pair of Kea Bouman and Henk Timmer.
