= Frank Heaney =

Irish footballer

Personal information
- Full name: Frank Heaney
- Date of birth: 23 November 1886
- Place of birth: Dublin, Ireland
- Date of death: 24 August 1937 (aged 50)
- Place of death: Dublin, Ireland
- Height: 6 ft 0 in (1.83 m)
- Position: Right back

Senior career*
Years	Team	Apps	(Gls)
- St James’s Gate
1911–1912	Leeds City	2	(0)
- St James’s Gate
- Shelbourne
- St James’s Gate

International career
1913–1921	Ireland Amateurs	3	(0)
- * Club domestic league appearances and goals

Frank Heaney (23 November 1886 – 24 August 1937) was an Irish amateur footballer who played in the Football League for Leeds City as a right back. He was a member of the Irish Free State squad for the 1924 Summer OIympics, but did not travel to the tournament.

== Personal life ==
Heaney's brother John also became a footballer. He served in the Irish Guards during the First World War and died of stomach cancer in 1937.

== Career statistics ==
Appearances and goals by club, season and competition
Club	Season	League			National Cup		Total	
Club	Season	Division	Apps	Goals	Apps	Goals	Apps	Goals
Leeds City	1911–12	Second Division	2	0	0	0	2	0
Career total			2	0	0	0	2	0

== Honours ==
St James's Gate

- League of Ireland (1): 1921–22
- FAI Cup (1): 1921–22
- Irish Intermediate Cup (1): 1919–20
- Leinster Senior League (1): 1919–20
- Leinster Senior Cup (2): 1919–20, 1921–22
- LFA Metropolitan Cup (1): 1919–20
