= Paola Bologna =

Italian tennis player

- Full name: Paola Maria Andreina Bologna
- Country (sports): Italian
- Born: 20 August 1898; Turin, Kingdom of Italy
- Died: 13 January 1960 (aged 61); Turin, Italy

Paola Bologna (20 August 1898 – 13 January 1960) was an Italian tennis player. She competed in the women's singles event at the 1924 Summer Olympics.

At some point, her married surname became Malfatti di Monte Tretto.
