= YMCA College of Physical Education =

College in Chennai, India

Coordinates: 13.02657°N 80.23622°E

Y.M.C.A. College of Physical Education
- Type: Govt. aided college
- Established: September 1920; 106 years ago
- Academic affiliations: Tamil Nadu Physical Education and Sports University
- Chairman: Justice Kurian Joseph (Retd.)
- Principal: Dr. George Abraham
- Location: Chennai, Tamil Nadu, India
- Campus: Urban
- Website: ymcacollege.ac.in

YMCA College of Physical Education, the first college for physical education of Asia, was established in 1920 by Harry Crowe Buck of Pennsylvania, United States. The college is now affiliated with the Tamil Nadu Physical Education and Sports University.

== History ==
The YMCA Madras was started in 1920 and it started its academic operation from the year 1931, as a first Physical Education college of South Asia with two academic programmes, 'Certificate in Physical Education' and 'Diploma in Physical Education' affiliated to the University of Madras.

== Campus ==
The college, originally located in George Town, a prominent central business district of Chennai, and later shifted to Royapettah. The Nandanam campus of the College, spread over 64.5 acres (261,000 m^{2}) of land, houses several classrooms, gymnasiums, laboratories, a computer centre, a library, and an open-air theatre.

== Course ==
The college offers undergraduates, postgraduates, diploma and other certificate courses in Physical education and sports sciences. The Bachelor of Mobility Science (B.M.S) programme is recognized by Rehabilitation Council of India (RCI).

== Initiatives ==
- The college became co-educational in 1940.
- One of the first colleges of physical education to promote sports for disabled persons.
- The college has designed orientation and mobility training for blind people.

== Sports Medicine ==
The founder of Indian Institute of Sports Medicine and SPARRC, Dr. Kannan Pugazhendi was initially employed here as Medical Officer. Later, he has been the Sports Physician for most of the International Sports Teams in India including Cricket, Hockey and Football.
