= Michael O'Connor (water polo) =

Irish water polo player

Personal information
- Nationality: Irish
- Born: 27 February 1900 Belfast, United Kingdom
- Died: 26 December 1957 (aged 57) Dublin, Ireland

Sport
- Sport: Water polo

Michael O’Connor (front row, second from left) at the 1928 Olympics

Michael O'Connor (27 February 1900 – 26 December 1957) was an Irish water polo player. He competed at the 1924 Summer Olympics and the 1928 Summer Olympics.
