= Peadar Gaskins =

Irish association footballer

Personal information
- Date of birth: 10 May 1908
- Place of birth: Dublin, Ireland
- Date of death: 7 September 1949 (aged 41)
- Place of death: Dublin, Ireland

Senior career*
Years	Team	Apps	(Gls)
1932–1937	Shamrock Rovers		
1937–1938	St James's Gate		

International career
1934–1935	Republic of Ireland	5	(0)
- * Club domestic league appearances and goals

Peadar Gaskins was an Irish footballer who played as a defender.

== Career ==
Gaskins was born in Dublin on 10 May 1908. He joined Shamrock Rovers in 1932 where he stayed for five seasons.

He won five caps for the Republic of Ireland captaining the side in all of his five appearances. He made his debut as captain in a 4–4 draw against Belgium which was Ireland's first World Cup qualifier on 25 February 1934. He played in the next four games: a 5–2 World Cup qualifier defeat to Holland in the Olympic Stadium (Amsterdam), a friendly against Hungary at Dalymount Park, a friendly against Switzerland in Basel with his last cap coming against Germany in the Stadion Rote Erde on 8 May 1935.

He captained the League of Ireland XI team in a 2–1 victory over the Welsh Football League XI in his only Inter League appearance on 18 March 1935.

On 27 August 1937, Gaskins had a benefit match at Shelbourne Park. Gaskins later moved to St James's Gate F.C. where he won the FAI Cup in the 1937–38 season, scoring a penalty in the 2–1 victory over Dundalk

He died on 7 September 1949 in Dublin at the age of 41.

== Sources ==
- Paul Doolan; Robert Goggins. The Hoops. ISBN 0-7171-2121-6.
- Peadar Gaskins at WorldFootball.net
- Peadar Gaskins at National-Football-Teams.com
