= Joseph Golding =

Irish footballer

Joseph Golding was an Irish footballer who played as an outside right.

== Career ==
Born in Dublin, he joined Shamrock Rovers in 1926 from Brideville and stayed for a decade.

His first game was the official opening of Glenmalure Park on 19 September 1926 against Belfast Celtic and was part of the team that went unbeaten in 1926/27.

He won two caps for the Irish Free State in two away friendlies against Belgium. His debut came at Liège on 12 February 1928 in a 4–2 victory. His last cap was on 11 May 1930 at Astrid Park in a 3–1 win.

Golding earned two League of Ireland XI caps in 1929 and 1930 and scored a total of 20 league goals at while at Milltown.

== Sources ==
- Paul Doolan; Robert Goggins. The Hoops. ISBN 0-7171-2121-6.
- Joe Golding at WorldFootball.net
