= Nora Polley =

Indian tennis player

Personal information
- Born: Nora Margaret Fischer; 29 July 1894 Budaun, North-Western Provinces, British India
- Died: 1988 (aged 93–94) Leominster, Great Britain

Sport
- Country: India
- Sport: Tennis

Nora Margaret Polley (née Fischer; 29 July 1894 – 1988) was the first woman to represent India at the Summer Olympics when she competed in the tennis events at the 1924 Summer Olympics.

Nora Fischer was born in Budaun, British India, records show that in 1901 she was living in Scotland before going to boarding school in Eastbourne in 1911, she would later marry Sydney Trepess Polley in 1915, who had been serving in the Indian Army since 1902 and would later be promoted to Major.

Polley competed in both the women's singles and mixed doubles tennis events at the 1924 Summer Olympics which were held in Paris, France, she had prepared for the event by reaching the semi-finals in a tournament in Cannes. In the Olympic women's singles she received a bye in the first round before meeting Greek player Lena Valaoritou-Skaramaga in the second round, she eventually won in three sets, in the third round she was up against Spanish player Lilí Álvarez, unfortunately she was totally outplayed and lost in straight sets 0–6, 3–6. In the mixed doubles she teamed up with Sydney Jacob also from India, they received a bye in the first round, then in the second round they lost to the Irish pair of Edwin McCrea and Mary Wallis in three sets.

In the same summer after the Olympics, Polley traveled to England and played a couple of more tournaments in the south of England, including the Tunbridge Wells Tennis Tournaments, and an event in Bexhill-on-Sea, after this no more records can be found.

Nora Polley died in 1988 in Leominster, Herefordshire.
