= Charlie Lennon (Irish footballer) =

Republic of Ireland footballer

Personal information
- Full name: Charles Lennon
- Place of birth: Ireland

Senior career*
Years	Team	Apps	(Gls)
1934–1937	St James Gate		
- Shelbourne

International career
1934–1935	Republic of Ireland	3	(0)
- * Club domestic league appearances and goals

Charles Lennon was an Irish international footballer.

Between 1934 and 1937, he played for St James Gate. Lennon was capped three times for the Republic of Ireland at senior level. He made his debut in a 4–2 friendly defeat to Hungary on 16 December 1934.

He was part of the Shelbourne team that won the 1939 FAI Cup beating Sligo Rovers.
