= 1939–40 League of Ireland =

League of Ireland
- Season: 1939–40
- Champions: St. James's Gate (2nd title)
- Matches played: 132
- Goals scored: 540 (4.09 per match)
- Top goalscorer: Patrick Bradshaw (29 goals)

The 1939–40 League of Ireland was the nineteenth season of the League of Ireland. Shamrock Rovers were the two-time defending champions.

St James's Gate won their second title.

== Overview ==
No new teams were elected to the League.

Cork City withdrew on 13 February 1940. However, a new team, Cork United, were immediately elected in their place, being given special permission to complete Cork City's remaining fixtures.

== Teams ==
Locations of the 1939–40 League of Ireland teams

Team	Location	Stadium
Bohemians	Dublin (Phibsborough)	Dalymount Park
Bray Unknowns	Bray	Carlisle Grounds
Brideville	Dublin (The Liberties)	Harold's Cross Stadium
Cork City	Cork	Mardyke
Cork United (Note: Cork City withdrew on 13 February 1940. However, a new team, Cork United, were immediately elected in their place, being given special permission to complete Cork City's remaining fixtures.)	Cork	Mardyke
Drumcondra	Dublin (Clonturk)	Clonturk Park
Dundalk	Dundalk	Oriel Park
Limerick	Limerick	Markets Field
St. James's Gate	Dublin (Crumlin)	St. James's Park
Shamrock Rovers	Dublin (Milltown)	Glenmalure Park
Shelbourne	Dublin (Ringsend)	Shelbourne Park
Sligo Rovers	Sligo	The Showgrounds
Waterford	Waterford	Kilcohan Park

== Table ==
Pos	Team	Pld	W	D	L	GF	GA	GD	Pts
1	St James's Gate	22	17	2	3	63	27	+36	36
2	Shamrock Rovers	22	13	4	5	51	39	+12	30
3	Sligo Rovers	22	12	4	6	60	44	+16	28
4	Dundalk	22	11	3	8	45	36	+9	25
5	Cork United	22	11	3	8	40	34	+6	25
6	Drumcondra	22	10	5	7	49	45	+4	25
7	Shelbourne	22	6	8	8	41	39	+2	20
8	Bohemians	22	7	4	11	36	46	−10	18
9	Bray Unknowns	22	8	1	13	49	52	−3	17
10	Brideville	22	6	5	11	39	49	−10	17
11	Waterford	22	6	4	12	44	54	−10	16
12	Limerick	22	1	5	16	23	75	−52	7

Source: www.rsssf.com

== Results ==
Home \ Away	BOH	BRY	BRI	CUF	DRU	DUN	LIM	SHM	SHE	SLI	STG	WAT
Bohemians	—	3–1	0–0	4–2	1–1	1–3	3–1	1–4	1–1	3–1	2–3	3–0
Bray Unknowns	6–2	—	1–3	7–2	3–1	1–1	6–0	2–3	4–2	3–1	0–5	4–0
Brideville	1–2	4–1	—	1–2	1–3	3–2	1–1	1–2	5–2	1–4	0–3	2–2
Cork United	2–1	2–0	1–3	—	1–1	5–2	3–0	1–2	2–1	4–1	0–3	4–1
Drumcondra	2–0	3–1	4–4	0–2	—	2–5	3–3	1–0	1–0	3–5	0–1	3–2
Dundalk	1–0	2–0	1–0	0–1	2–3	—	4–1	4–0	3–2	1–2	3–2	3–2
Limerick	2–2	0–1	3–1	1–1	0–5	0–3	—	0–3	0–2	2–4	2–4	1–1
Shamrock Rovers	2–0	4–2	2–3	3–2	2–4	2–1	4–1	—	1–1	2–2	2–5	5–2
Shelbourne	0–1	4–2	2–2	1–0	1–3	1–1	8–1	3–3	—	1–1	1–0	2–1
Sligo Rovers	3–2	2–1	4–2	0–0	6–2	3–1	9–1	1–1	3–2	—	1–3	3–1
St James's Gate	6–1	3–2	4–0	1–0	1–1	3–0	5–3	1–2	2–2	3–2	—	2–1
Waterford	4–3	5–1	3–1	1–3	4–3	2–2	2–0	1–2	2–2	5–2	2–3	—

Legend: Blue = home team win; Yellow = draw; Red = away team win.

== Top goalscorers ==
Pos	Player	Club	Goals
1	Patrick Bradshaw	St James's Gate	29
