= St James's Gate F.C. =

Association football club in Republic of Ireland

- Full name: St James's Gate Football Club
- Nickname: The Gate
- Founded: 1902; 124 years ago
- Ground: Iveagh Grounds; Crumlin Road; Dublin 12
- League: Leinster Senior League
- Website: stjamesgatefc.com
Home colours

St James's Gate Football Club is an Irish association football club based in Drimnagh, Dublin. They played in the League of Ireland between 1921–22 and 1943–44 and again from 1990–91 until 1995–96. Gate were the inaugural winners of both the League of Ireland and the FAI Cup.

Like several fellow early League of Ireland clubs, such as Fordsons, Jacobs, Midland Athletic and Dundalk, Gate had their origins as a factory or works team. They were initially the football team of the St James's Gate Brewery, the home of Guinness. In total, the club competed in 23 seasons of the League of Ireland. In July 2022 they narrowly survived folding and survived due to a public appeal.

== History ==
=== Early years ===
St. James's Gate Football Club was founded in 1902 for the workers of the Guinness brewery at St. James's Gate. The prime mover behind forming the club was John Lumsden, then serving as a medical officer at St James's Gate Brewery. Nicknamed "the Gate", the club's first major trophies were gained in 1909–10, when they won both the Leinster Senior League title and the Irish Intermediate Cup. In 1919–20, with a team that included Charlie Dowdall, Paddy Duncan and Ernie MacKay, the Gate won four trophies – the Leinster Senior League title, the Irish Intermediate Cup, the Leinster Senior Cup and the LFA Metropolitan Cup.

=== First League of Ireland era ===
In 1921–22, together with Shelbourne, Bohemians, Jacobs, Frankfort, Olympia, YMCA and Dublin United, St James's Gate became founder members of the League of Ireland. Like the Gate, the other seven founding members had spent the 1920–21 season playing in the Leinster Senior League. Gate initially emerged as one of the strongest teams in the league and in their debut season won a treble. In addition to winning the inaugural league title, they also won the 1921–22 FAI Cup and the 1921–22 Leinster Senior Cup. This season proved to be the highlight of Gate's time in the League of Ireland.

In 1939–40 they won a second league title, however after finishing in last place in 1943–44 they failed to gain re-election. It had been suggested that the reason for this was the club announcing its intention to revert to amateur status. However, when the vote was being taken, the representative for Shamrock Rovers stated, "the St. James's Gate club has not full control over their own finances, as any profit made during the season goes to the Guinness Athletic Union and is therefore lost to football." The other clubs were also known to be unhappy that members of the Guinness Athletic Union did not have to pay into home matches, depriving those clubs of their share of gate receipts.

==== Placings ====
Chart of yearly table positions for St. James's Gate in League of Ireland

Season	Pts	Place	Season	Pts	Place
1921–22	23	1st	1933–34	13	8th
1922–23	25	5th	1934–35	27	2nd
1923–24	20	5th	1935–36	19	10th
1924–25	17	6th	1936–37	23	5th
1925–26	11	8th	1937–38	27	5th
1926–27	12	9th	1938–39	23	4th
1927–28	14	7th	1939–40	36	1st
1928–29	14	6th	1940–41	21	5th
1929–30	11	9th	1941–42	19	5th
1930–31	18	10th	1942–43	18	6th
1932–33	10	11th	1943–44	3	8th
1932–33	17	6th

==== Records ====
Stat	Opponent	Score	Competition	Date
Record Win	Jacobs	8–0	1929–30	24 August 1929
Record Defeat	Waterford; Cork United; Shamrock Rovers	0–7; 0–7; 0–7	1931–32; 1943–44; 1943–44	22 November 1931; 19 December 1943; 27 December 1943

=== Second League of Ireland era ===
In 1990–91 Gate joined the League of Ireland First Division, replacing Newcastlewest. In 1995, the club was taken over by a consortium. Only one year later, however, just before the start of the 1996–97 season they pulled out of the league, unable to meet their financial responsibilities. They were replaced by St. Francis.

=== 110th Anniversary Tournament ===
To celebrate their 110th anniversary, in July 2012 the club hosted a tournament.

==== Semi-finals ====
14 July 2012

(Northern Ireland) Ballymena United	1–1 Ballymena won 5–3 after penalties	(Wales) Port Talbot Town
White, 90'	(Report)	???, 6'

14 July 2012

(Republic of Ireland) St James's Gate	2–0	(Republic of Ireland) Bohemians
	(Report)

==== Third place play-off ====
16 July 2012

(Republic of Ireland) Bohemians	0–6	(Wales) Port Talbot Town
	(Report)

==== Final ====
16 July 2012

(Republic of Ireland) St James's Gate	0–2	(Northern Ireland) Ballymena United
	(Report)	Baker; Teggart (pen)

== Grounds ==
Gate originally played their home games at Bellevue Lodge by the Grand Canal near Inchicore. The same venue was also used by Olympia. Between 1921 and 1928 they played at St. James's Park in Dolphin's Barn on a pitch hired by the Guinness board. In 1928 they moved to the Iveagh Grounds which, as of October 2025, remains their home ground.

== Notable former players ==
Republic of Ireland internationals

On 28 May 1924 when Ireland made their international debut at the 1924 Olympics against Bulgaria, the Ireland team included three Gate players – Paddy Duncan, Michael Farrell and Ernie MacKay. A fourth member of the team, Paddy O'Reilly, would also later play for the club. Duncan also scored the Republic of Ireland's first international goal. Joe O'Reilly, with 20, was also the most capped player for Ireland in the pre–Second World War era.

- (Republic of Ireland) Paddy Bermingham
- (Republic of Ireland) Paddy Bradshaw
- (Republic of Ireland) Pat Byrne
- (Republic of Ireland) Johnny Carey
- (Republic of Ireland) Martin Colfer
- (Republic of Ireland) Charlie Dowdall
- (Republic of Ireland) Bobby Duffy
- (Republic of Ireland) Paddy Duncan
- (Republic of Ireland) Michael Farrell
- (Republic of Ireland) Dominic Foley
- (Republic of Ireland) Peadar Gaskins
- (Republic of Ireland) Matty Geoghegan
- (Republic of Ireland) Billy Kennedy
- (Republic of Ireland) Owen Kinsella
- (Republic of Ireland) Charlie Lennon
- (Republic of Ireland) Ernie MacKay
- (Republic of Ireland) Emmet McLoughlin
- (Republic of Ireland) Tom Murphy
- (Republic of Ireland) Joe O'Reilly
- (Republic of Ireland) Paddy O'Reilly
- (Republic of Ireland) Alf Rigby

Republic of Ireland women's internationals

- (Republic of Ireland) Katie Taylor
- (Republic of Ireland) Mary Waldron

Republic of Ireland U21 internationals

- (Republic of Ireland) John Bacon
- (Republic of Ireland) Martin Bayly
- (Republic of Ireland) Ritchie Bayly

League of Ireland XI representatives

- (Republic of Ireland) Mick Byrne
- (Republic of Ireland) Pat Byrne
- (Republic of Ireland) Paul Byrne
- (Republic of Ireland) Martin Colfer

Ireland (IFA) internationals

In addition to playing for Ireland teams selected by the FAI, at least five Gate players also played for Ireland teams selected by the Irish Football Association.

- (Ireland) Johnny Carey – Senior
- (Ireland) Ernie MacKay – Junior
- (Ireland) Emmet McLoughlin – Amateur
- (Ireland) Frank Heaney – Amateur
- (Ireland) Harry Litton – Amateur

Goalscorers

On seven occasions St James's Gate players finished as the League of Ireland's top goalscorer. On 30 March 1930, Willie Byrne scored six goals in a 7–1 win against Sligo Rovers. Paddy Bradshaw, with 68, remains Gate's top goalscorer in the League of Ireland.

Season	Player	Goals
1921–22	Jack Kelly	11
1932–33	George Ebbs	20
1933–34	Alf Rigby	13
1934–35	Alf Rigby	17
1937–38	Willie Byrne	25
1938–39	Paddy Bradshaw	22
1939–40	Paddy Bradshaw	29

Boxer

- (Republic of Ireland) Katie Taylor – Irish, European, World and Olympic boxing champion

== Honours ==
- League of Ireland : 2
  - 1921–22, 1939–40
- Leinster Senior League: 6
  - 1909–10, 1911–12, 1914–15, 1919–20, 1987–88, 1988–89
- FAI Cup : 2
  - 1921–22, 1937–38
- League of Ireland Shield : 2
  - 1935–36, 1940–41
- Dublin City Cup : 1
  - 1938–39
- Leinster Senior Cup: 5
  - 1919–20, 1921–22, 1934–35, 1936–37, 1940–41
- LFA Metropolitan Cup
  - 1919–20
- Irish Intermediate Cup : 2
  - 1909–10, 1919–20
- FAI Intermediate Cup : 1
  - 1950–51
