= Marie Janssen =

Belgian tennis player

- Country (sports): Belgium
- Born: 1899

Marie Janssen (born 1899, date of death unknown) was a Belgian tennis player. She competed in the women's singles event at the 1924 Summer Olympics.
