= D'Arcy McCrea =

Irish tennis player

- Full name: Edward D'Arcy McCrea
- Country (sports): Ireland
- Born: 7 February 1896 Dublin, Ireland
- Died: 22 December 1940 (aged 44) Salford, England
- Turned pro: 1919 (amateur tour)
- Retired: 1928

Singles
- Career record: 68–25
- Career titles: 8

Edward D'Arcy McCrea (7 February 1896 – 22 December 1940) was an Irish tennis player. He competed in the mixed doubles, men's singles and men's double at the 1924 Summer Olympics. He was active from 1919 to 1928 and contested 10 career singles finals and won 8 titles. He died during the Second World War.

== Tennis career ==
McCrea played and won his first tournament in 1919 at the County Dublin Championships where he reached the finals and defeated John King Maconchy in four sets. In 1920 he won two singles titles at the East of Ireland Championships (against Val Miley), and the County Dublin meeting (against Jack Miley). In 1921 he then took part in the Irish Championships where he reached the semi finals but lost to Cecil Campbell. He then traveled to Scarborough to take part in the North of England Championships where he progressed to the final, but was defeated by the South African international Brian Norton.

In early 1922 he traveled to Spain to take part in the Barcelona International tournament on clay, where he progressed to the semi finals and lost to Manuel Alonso Areizaga. He next played at the East of Ireland Championships where he won the title for the second time (against Bunny Ireland). He then took part in the Derbyshire Championships in Buxton, and was successful in winning that title (against Britain's George Fletcher).

1923 for McRea successfully defended his Buxton title winning the Derbyshire Championships for the second time (against Portuguese player José Domingo). He finished the season playing at the North of England Championships where he reached the final, but lost to the Anglo-Indian tennis player Sydney Jacob.

McRea then entered a period of semi retirement where he did not compete in many tournaments. In 1927 after a four break he took part in two events that season. At the Irish Championships in Dublin he lost a five set semi final against Pat Hughes. That year he won his final singles title at the Northern Championships in Manchester where he won the title (against Douglas Arthur Hodges) in five sets. He played his final tournament at the 1928 Irish Lawn Tennis Championships where he lost in the quarter finals stage to Alexander Pitt.

== Personal life ==
McCrea studied at Trinity College, Dublin and graduated in 1920. Designated a Master of Surgery in 1922, he became a fellow of the Royal College of Surgeons in Ireland the same year. Settling in Manchester, he worked at Salford Royal Hospital and taught physiology at the University of Manchester.

McCrea died on 22 December 1940 in the midst of the Manchester Blitz. Whilst hosting a party at his home in Salford, a Luftwaffe parachute mine struck the house and exploded, killing all inside.
