= Rosa Torras =

Spanish tennis player (1895–1986)

Personal information
- Nationality: Spanish
- Born: 1 January 1895; Barcelona, Spain
- Died: 26 August 1986 (aged 91); Barcelona, Spain

Sport
- Sport: Tennis

Rosa Torras (1 January 1895 – 26 August 1986) was a Spanish tennis player. She competed in the women's singles event at the 1924 Summer Olympics.
