= Paddy Bermingham (footballer) =

Irish footballer (1904–1970)

Patrick Joseph Bermingham (17 March 1904 – 7 November 1970) was an Irish footballer who played as a defender and represented the Irish Free State national team in 1934.

== Career ==
Born in March 1904 and from the Rathcoole area of County Dublin, Bermingham was a pupil of the Royal Hibernian Military School in Dublin's Phoenix Park and was school cross-country, swimming and boxing champion. Early in his career Bermingham worked for WD & HO Wills Cigarettes on South Circular Road before working at Urney's Confectionery in Tallaght. He lived in the Dublin suburb of Rialto.

Bermingham played professional football for several Irish clubs including Brideville, St. James Gate Athletic Football Club, Shamrock Rovers and Belfast Celtic.

Bermingham played for the Irish Free State Football Team and scored a penalty in the 62nd minute against Hungary in Dalymount Park in a friendly match in Dublin on Sunday 16 December 1934. He was one of the youngest players ever to play for the Free State team. Bermingham was also capped by the Irish Free State against Norway, earning both call ups while with St. James Gate Athletic Football Club

When his playing career ended Bermingham was part of the management team for Dundalk during their 1948 Football Association of Ireland Challenge Cup success. He retired in 1963 after a two-year term as coach of Bohemians

Bermingham died on 7 November 1970 aged 66.
