= Mohammed Sleem =

Indian tennis player

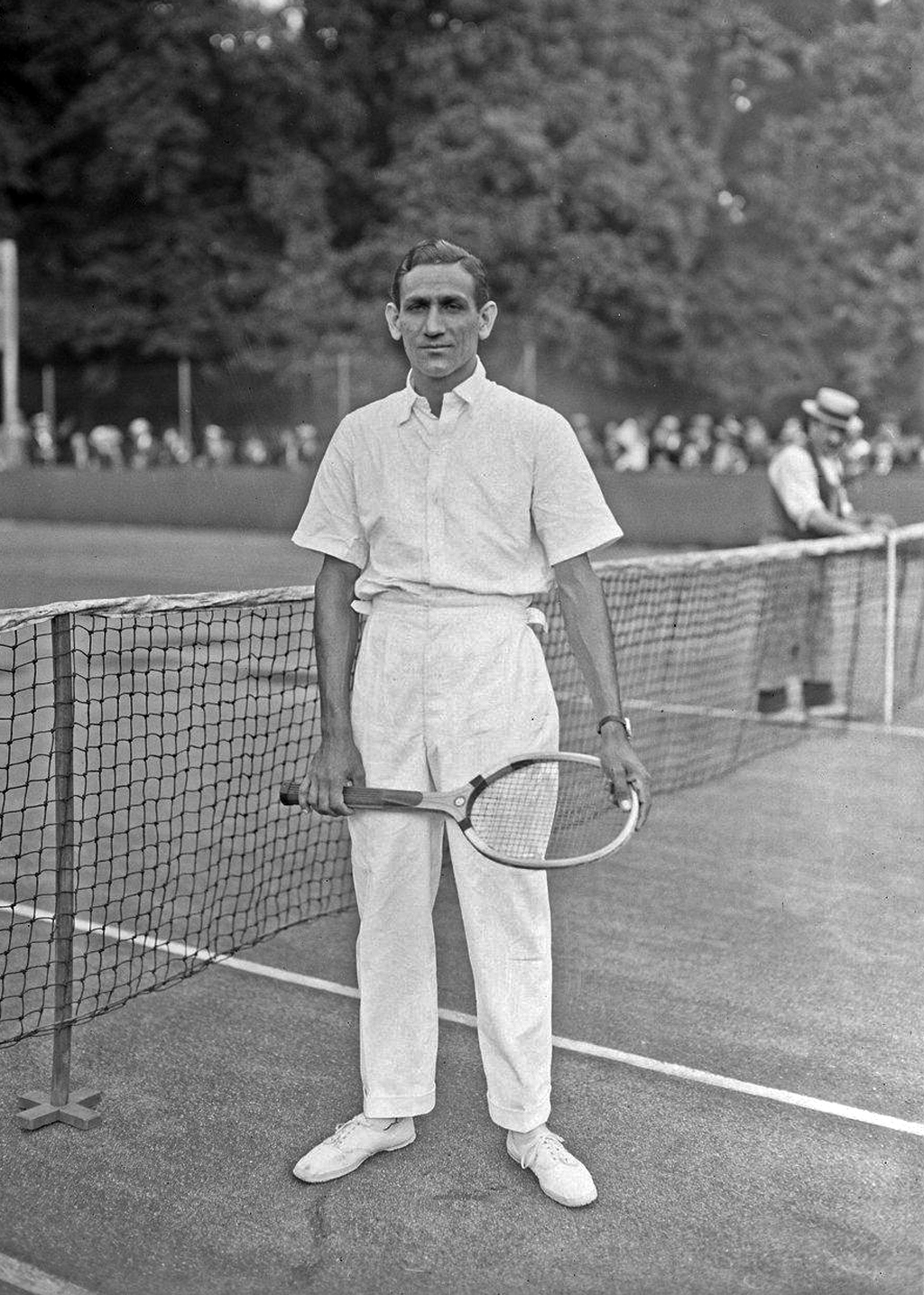
- Sleem in 1921
- Country (sports): India
- Born: 14 January 1892; India

Singles
- Career record: 119–38, (75.8%)
- Career titles: 27

Grand Slam singles results
- French Open: 4R (1928, 1934)
- Wimbledon: 4R (1921)

Other tournaments
- Olympic Games: 3R (1924)

Doubles
- Olympic Games: 1R (1924)

Mohammed Sleem (14 January 1892 – around 1980) was a tennis player and lawyer who represented India at the Davis Cup and Olympic Games. He competed in the singles event at the 1924 Summer Olympics, reaching the third round in which he lost to eventual Olympic champion Vincent Richards. With compatriot Sydney Jacob he competed in the men's doubles event and lost in the first round. Between 1915 and 1931 he won 27 career titles.

== Tennis career ==
He played his first tournament at Craigside, on grass at County Durham, England in 1913 which he won. Sleem won thirteen titles at the Punjab Lawn Tennis Championships, the first of which was in 1915. In June 1921 he reached the finals of the London Championships on grass before losing to Japanese player Zenzo Shimizu in straight sets. In September 1921, he won the Sussex Championships at Brighton defeating compatriot Cotah Ramaswami in three sets. he was a runner-up at the South of England Championships held in Eastbourne losing to South African Brian Norton in five sets. he won the London Country Club hard court tournament held at Hendon defeating Sydney Jacob in straight sets. In mid October he clinched the Queen's Club Hard Court crown by beating Walter Crawley for the title. In late October he won the Welsh Covered Court Championships, defeating Arthur Lovibond, the holder, Francis Gordon Lowe and Crawley for the second time within two weeks on his way to the trophy.

In February 1922 he won the All India Championships held in Allahabad defeating Australian player Harry Lewis-Barclay in three sets. 1924 was his most successful season winning eight titles from nine finals. In June 1922 he won the Simla Championships defeating Jagat Mohan Lal in three straight sets. In July 1924 he won the Deauville tournament, for which he upset compatriot Syed Mohammad Hadi who gave the match up after two sets. In September he was victorious at the South of England Championships where he had a clean win over Gordon Lowe in the final. 1928 was another successful season in which he won the All England Plate in July, followed by the Midland Counties Championships at Edgbaston and Herga LTC Championships at Harrow, Middlesex. In September 1924 he won the Gleneagles Hardcourts on clay at Gleneagles, Scotland defeating New Zealands Frank Fisher two sets to love. In June 1928 he travelled to Italy and competed in and won the TC Juventus Torino event in Turin. In August 1928 he reached the semi-finals of the German International Championships, he then won the West Sussex Championships at Bognor Regis and the Southampton LTC Championships at Southampton the same month. In 1934 he won the indoor Cromer Covered Courts tournament at Newhaven Court, Cromer, Norfolk against Jimmy Jones. He played his final tournament in August 1937 the Westgate-on-Sea Tournament at Westgate-on-Sea, Kent, England where he reached the quarter-finals. He was the member of the Queen's Club.

== Personal life ==
Sleem was the son of Sheikh Mohammed Umar of Lahore. He became a criminal lawyer after graduating from Cambridge University. He practised as a barrister in England and was admitted to Lincoln's Inn in 1910. He spoke English and Urdu. He was the uncle of Manzur Qadir. He practised tennis at the Gymkhana Club of Punjab when he resided in India. He was buried in the Miani Sahib Graveyard in Lahore, Pakistan.

== Works cited ==
- Sharafi, Mitra (2012). "South Asians at the Inns of Court: Lincoln's Inn, 1864–1947" (PDF). University of Wisconsin. p. 53.
- "Olympic Sports – Athletes – Mohammed Sleem". sports-reference.com. Archived from the original on 18 April 2020.
- Majumdar, Boria, ed. (2009). Sport in South Asian Society : past and present. London: Routledge. p. 118. ISBN 978-0415568272.
- Singh, Khushwant (2013). Malicious Gossip Pb. India: HarperCollins Publishers. p. 118. ISBN 9789350292891.
- "Mahomed Sleem Takes Wales Tennis Title Back to India" (PDF). Utica Morning Telegram. II (105). Utica, Oneida, New York United States: Globe-Telegram Co: 17. 31 October 1921.
- "Tennis finals". The Northern Advocate: 5. 4 October 1921.
- Singh, Khushwant (2006). "In the name of God". India: Telegraph of India. Archived from the original on 5 February 2014.
- François Coty, ed. (21 September 1921). "Lawn-Tennis". Le Figaro (in French) (264). Paris, France: Dassault Group: 6. ISSN 0182-5852.
- François Coty, ed. (25 October 1921). "Lawn-Tennis". Le Figaro (in French) (298). Paris, France: Dassault Group: 6. ISSN 0182-5852.
- François Coty, ed. (29 July 1924). "Lawn-Tennis". Le Figaro (in French) (211). Paris, France: Dassault Group: 6. ISSN 0182-5852.
- François Coty, ed. (16 September 1924). "Lawn-Tennis". Le Figaro (in French) (260). Paris, France: Dassault Group: 5. ISSN 0182-5852.
