= Giulia Perelli (tennis) =

Italian tennis player

Personal information
- Nationality: Italian
- Born: 1897; Milan, Italy
- Died: 1964 (aged 66–67)

Sport
- Sport: Tennis

Giulia Perelli (1897 – 1964) was an Italian tennis player. She competed in the women's singles event at the 1924 Summer Olympics.
