= Sydney Jacob =

Indian tennis player

Sydney Montague Jacob
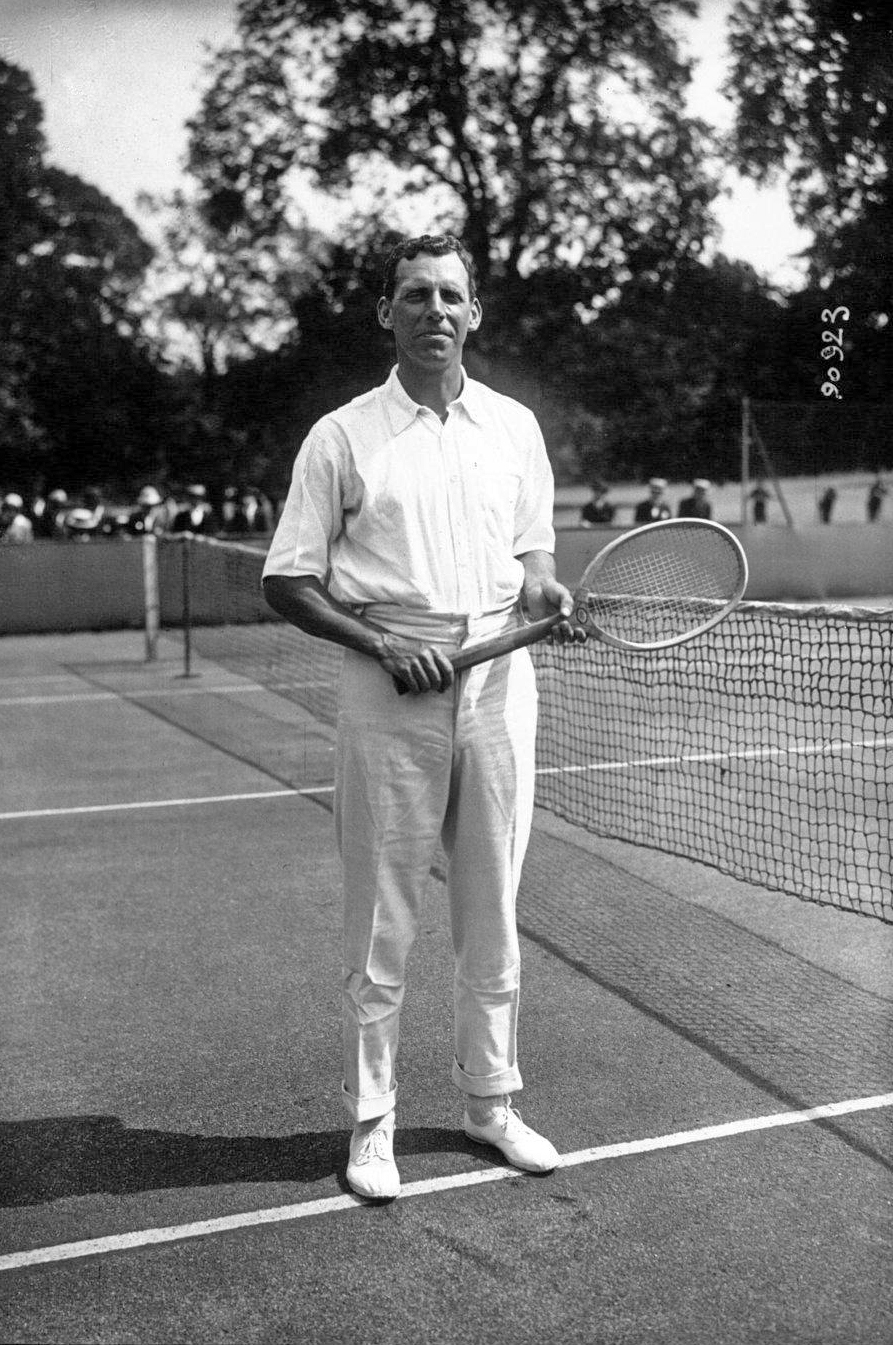
- Jacob in 1921
- Full name: Sydney Montague Jacob
- Country (sports): India
- Born: 28 October 1879 Dalhousie, British India
- Died: 14 February 1977 (aged 97) Woldingham, Surrey, England
- Turned pro: 1907 (amateur tour)
- Retired: 1928

Singles
- Career record: 55–37
- Career titles: 15

Grand Slam singles results
- French Open: SF (1925)
- Wimbledon: QF (1925)

Other tournaments
- Olympic Games: QF (1924)

Grand Slam doubles results
- Wimbledon: SF (1921)

Other doubles tournaments
- Olympic Games: 1R (1924)

Grand Slam mixed doubles results
- Wimbledon: 2R (1924, 1925, 1927)

Other mixed doubles tournaments
- Olympic Games: 2R (1924)

Sydney Montague Jacob (28 October 1879 – 14 February 1977) was an Anglo-Indian tennis player who represented India at the Davis Cup and Olympic Games. He was active from 1907 to 1928 and won 15 career singles titles.

== Career ==
He competed in the singles event at the 1924 Summer Olympics, reaching the quarterfinal in which he lost to Jean Borotra. With compatriot Mohammed Sleem, he competed in the men's doubles event and reached the second round. He also competed in the mixed doubles event with compatriot Nora Polley but lost their first match in the second round after a bye in the first round. Jacob reached the semi-finals at the French championships in 1925, where he beat Jacques Brugnon and Andre Gobert before losing to René Lacoste. He won the London Covered Court Championships two times, in 1925 and 1927.

He published an autobiographical book titled Favour for Fools in a Decadent Empire: A Skeletal Autobiography.
