= Tom Murphy (Irish footballer) =

Irish footballer

Personal information
- Full name: Thomas Murphy
- Position: Defender

Senior career*
Years	Team	Apps	(Gls)
- St James's Gate

International career
1924	Irish Free State	2	(0)
- * Club domestic league appearances and goals

Thomas Murphy, commonly known as Tom Murphy, was an Irish footballer who played as a defender and made two appearances for the Irish Free State national team.

== Career ==
Murphy was included in the Irish Free State squad for the 1924 Summer Olympic football tournament in Paris. Though he did not feature in the Olympics, he made two appearances for the team in friendly matches after Ireland's elimination from the tournament. The first match took place on 3 June 1924 against Estonia in Colombes, while the second took place in Dublin on 14 June against the United States. Both matches finished as 3–1 wins for Ireland.

== Career statistics ==
=== International ===
Irish Free State
Year	Apps	Goals
1924	2	0
Total	2	0
