= Phoebe Blair-White =

Irish tennis player

- Full name: Rosetta Phoebe Blair-White
- Country (sports): Republic of Ireland
- Born: 10 September 1894; Omagh, County Tyrone
- Died: 6 March 1991 (aged 95); Surrey, England

Singles
- Career titles: 12

Rosetta Phoebe "Binky" Blair-White (10 September 1894 – 6 March 1991) was an Irish tennis player.

== Biography ==
Phoebe Blair-White was born Rosetta Phoebe Newell in Omagh, County Tyrone, in 1895 or on 10 September 1894. Her parents were R. J. Newell, DL and JP, of Hillside, Omagh and Anna Frances Scott. She began playing tennis when the family moved to Monkstown, Dublin playing everyday against a wall. On 31 December 1918 she married Arthur Blair-White, a cricketer. They had three daughters, Rachel Majory (1921–2012), Juliet Francis (1926–2003), and Rosemary (1933–2007).

Blair-White was first noted as a tennis player in 1919 when she won the Monkstown lawn tennis club's ladies’ championships. She went on to win this event again in 1920 and 1921. In 1923, she also won the prestigious ladies’ singles at the Ulster Grass Court Championships at the Boat Club tournament in Belfast, the same year she won County Cavan Championships at Cavan against Freda Pearson. She was ranked alongside Norma Stoker and Hilda Wallis as the best female tennis players in Ireland. She was part of the Irish Olympic tennis team that competed in the 1924 games in Paris. She was defeated in both her first ladies singles and ladies doubles with Wallis. With her mixed double partner, William G. Ireland, she was also defeated in the first round of the mixed doubles competition. They lost in straight sets, only picking up four games against the British team.

Following the Olympics, she continued to succeed at domestic games. In 1924 she won the Ulster Grass Court Championships for the second year and again in 1925 Boat Club tournament in Belfast. In 1928 she won the all-comers ladies’ singles title at the Fitzwilliam Club Championships, Fitzwilliam Lawn Tennis Club in Dublin against Hilda Wallis and the all-comers ladies’ doubles event with Rosie Fleming. She won the all-comers singles event again in 1931 against Norma Stoker. She played at Wimbledon in 1929 but was knocked out of the tournament early. She represented Ireland numerous times against Australia and England.

She lived most of her life at Belcamp, Malahide near Dublin. Blair-White continued her interest in tennis for the rest of her life, even playing the game in her seventies and eighties with her grandchildren. She moved to Lifford County Donegal in the 1960s and latter years to Strabane County Tyrone. She died in Strabane Northern Ireland on 6 March 1991, and is buried in Lifford, County Donegal beside her husband.
