= Lena Valaoritou =

Greek tennis player (1897–1967)

- Country (sports): Greece
- Born: 1 March 1897; Athens, Greece
- Died: 1967 (aged 69–70); Ioannina, Greece

Lena Valaoritou (1 March 1897 – 1967) was a Greek tennis player. She competed in the women's singles event at the 1924 Summer Olympics.
