= Ernie MacKay =

Irish footballer

Personal information
- Full name: Ernest Arthur MacKay
- Date of birth: October 7, 1896
- Place of birth: Templemore, County Tipperary, Ireland
- Date of death: 1996 (aged 99)
- Place of death: Colchester
- Position: Defender

Senior career*
Years	Team	Apps	(Gls)
- St James's Gate

International career
1924	Republic of Ireland	2	
- * Club domestic league appearances and goals

Ernest MacKay (7 October 1896 – November 1995) was an Irish footballer who played in an international tournament representing Ireland in 1924.

== Personal life ==
MacKay was born in County Tipperary as the second son and fifth child of John and Mary Elizabeth MacKay. As a child, he lived at the Curragh Camp in County Kildare in Ireland before moving to Oxmantown Road in Dublin.

When the 1916 Easter Uprising broke out, MacKay remained in Ireland where he was employed as a telegram boy for the General Post Office in Dublin. He began playing football and joined the St James's Gate FC, where he was part of the team that won the League of Ireland in 1921 and 1922.

MacKay was also a member of the Irish Free State football team that competed in the 1924 Summer Olympics in Paris, France. They beat Bulgaria 1–0 in Round 2 but lost out to the Netherlands in extra time in the Quarterfinals. The team finished fifth out of twelve teams.

MacKay left Ireland with his wife Bea to live in Colchester near to their daughter Elizabeth in the 1960s after he had retired as a superintendent with the General Post Office. He died there in September 1996 aged 99.
