= Rosetta Gagliardi =

Italian tennis player

Personal information
- Nationality: Italian
- Born: 9 February 1895; Milan, Italy
- Died: 31 July 1973 (aged 78); Milan, Italy

Sport
- Sport: Tennis

Rosetta Gagliardi (9 February 1895 – 31 July 1973) was an Italian tennis player. She competed at the 1920 Summer Olympics and the 1924 Summer Olympics.
