= Freitas =

Freitas may refer to:

== People ==
=== Sports ===
- Alcindo Martha de Freitas, Brazilian football player
- Acelino Freitas (born 1975), Brazilian boxer
- Francisco José de Freitas (born 2003), Brazilian football player
- Getúlio Vargas Freitas Oliveira Júnior (born 1983), Brazilian football player
- Jesse Freitas (American football, born 1921), American football player
  - Jesse Freitas (American football, born 1951), his son, American football player
- Makoa Freitas (born 1979), American football player
- Manoel Cassiano de Freitas (born 1963), Brazilian football player
- Márcio Miranda Freitas Rocha da Silva (born 1981), Brazilian football player
- Miguel Freitas (born 1984), Portuguese racing driver
- Pedro Henrique Carvalho Freitas (born 1985), Brazilian football player
- Ricardo de Freitas Carreira (born 1978), Brazilian football player
- Rocky Freitas (1945–2022), American football player
- Rodrigo Freitas (footballer, born 2002), Portuguese footballer
- Tiago Freitas (born 2006), Portuguese footballer
- Tony Freitas (1908–1994), American baseball pitcher

=== Other professions ===
- Ángela Freitas, East Timorese politician
- Diogo Freitas do Amaral (1941–2019), Portuguese politician
- Eduardo Freitas, Portuguese motorsports official and race director
- Emerson Freitas (born 1999), Brazilian politician
- Nick Freitas (born 1979), American politician
- Nigel de Freitas (born 1979), a Trinidad and Tobago politician
- Paulin Freitas (1909–1989), Togolese politician and diplomat
- Regina Freitas (born 1960), Timorese politician
- Robert Freitas (born 1952), American nanotechnologist

== Places ==
- Freitas (Portugal), a village in Fafe, Portugal
- Estádio Bento Freitas, a stadium in Pelotas, Brazil
- Mark Edward Freitas Ice Forum, a hockey rink in Connecticut, United States

== See also ==
- Freitas (surname)
- De Freitas (disambiguation)
