= De Freitas =

De Freitas or DeFreitas may refer to:

== People ==
- Afonso Cláudio de Freitas Rosa (1859–1934), the first governor of the Brazilian state of Espirito Santo
- Alcindo Martha de Freitas (born 1945), a Brazilian football player
- Alexandre Edílson de Freitas (born 1976), a Brazilian football player
- Alfeu Martha de Freitas (born 1936), a Brazilian football player
- Alfredo Eduardo Barreto de Freitas Noronha (1918–2003), a Brazilian football player
- António A. de Freitas (born 1947), a Portuguese immunologist
- Augusto Teixeira de Freitas (1816–1883), a Brazilian jurist
- Bront DeFreitas (born 1978), British Virgin Islands cricketer
- Chris de Freitas, Associate Professor in the School of Environment at the University of Auckland in New Zealand
- Christophe Freitas (born 1981), a French football player
- Claudio Luiz Assuncao de Freitas (born 1972), a Brazilian football player
- Cyro de Freitas Valle (1896–1969), a Brazilian diplomat
- David de Freitas (Brazilian footballer) (born 1986), Brazilian football player
- David de Freitas (French footballer) (born 1979), French football player
- Edevaldo de Freitas (born 1958), a Brazilian football player
- Eleanor de Freitas (1990–2014)
- Elvis Defreitas (born 1981), Barbadian footballer
- Fabian de Freitas (born 1972), a Surinamese football player
- Fabiano Ribeiro de Freitas (born 1988), a Brazilian football player
- Fernanda de Freitas (born 1980), a Brazilian actress
- Frank DeFreitas (born 1956), American holographer
- Frederico de Freitas (1902–1980), a Portuguese composer, conductor and musicologist
- Gastão de Freitas Ferraz (World War II period), a Portuguese spy working for the Abwehr
- Geoffrey de Freitas (1913–1982), a British politician and diplomat
- Heleno de Freitas (1920–1959), a Brazilian football player
- João Bosco de Freitas Chaves (born 1974), a Brazilian football player
- João Bosco Gualberto de Freitas (born 1974), a Brazilian football player
- Jordan de Freitas (born 1966), a Brazilian football manager
- Jorge de Freitas Antunes (born 1942), a Brazilian composer
- José de Freitas Ribeiro (1868–1929), an official of the Portuguese Navy and a politician
- Jose Pedro de Freitas (1921–1971), a Brazilian self-proclaimed psychic surgeon
- José Ramalho Carvalho de Freitas (born 1980), a Brazilian football player
- José Vicente de Freitas (1869–1952), a Portuguese military officer and politician
- Jurandir de Freitas (1940–1996), a Brazilian football player
- Kevin De Freitas (living), a Canadian music video director
- Kléber de Souza Freitas (born 1983), a Brazilian football player
- Lançarote de Freitas (15th century), a Portuguese explorer and slave trader
- Lima de Freitas (1927–1998), a Portuguese painter, illustrator, ceramicist and writer
- Luís de Freitas Branco (1890–1955), a Portuguese composer and musicologist
- Manoel Cassiano de Freitas (born 1963), Brazilian football player
- Manuel de Freitas (born 1968), a South African politician
- Márcio Rezende de Freitas (born 1960), a Brazilian football referee
- Maycon Vieira de Freitas (born 1985), a Brazilian football player
- Michael de Freitas (1933–1975), a Trinidad and Tobago civil rights activist
- Nando de Freitas, researching in machine learning and deep learning at Oxford University
- Nigel de Freitas (born 1979), a Trinidad and Tobago politician
- Bebeto de Freitas (born 1950), a Brazilian volleyball coach and football manager
- Pete de Freitas (1961–1989), a musician and producer, best known as a drummer with Echo & the Bunnymen
- Phillip DeFreitas (born 1966), an English cricketer
- Ramon Lopes de Freitas (born 1989), a Brazilian football player
- Ramón Rodrigo de Freitas (born 1983), a Brazilian football player
- Ricardo de Freitas Carreira (born 1978), a former Brazilian football player
- Ricardo Alafim de Freitas (born 1988), a Brazilian para-cyclist
- Ronaldo Rogério de Freitas Mourão (born 1935), a Brazilian astronomer
- Ronildo Pereira de Freitas (born 1977), a Brazilian football player
- Ruy de Freitas (1916–2012), a Brazilian basketball player
- Scott DeFreitas (born 1969), American actor
- Sebastião de Freitas Branco de Herédia (1903–1983), a Portuguese fencer and modern pentathlete
- Sebastião de Freita Couto Júnior (born 1992), a Brazilian football player
- Uladislau Herculano de Freitas (1865–1926), a Brazilian politician
- Vítor Tiago de Freitas Fernandes (born 1986), a Portuguese football player

== Places ==
- José de Freitas, a municipality in the state of Piauí, Brazil
- Rodrigo de Freitas Lagoon (Lagoa Rodrigo de Freitas), a lagoon and district in the Lagoa, Zona Sul region of Rio de Janeiro, Brazil
- Lauro de Freitas, a municipality in the north-east of the state of Bahia, Brazil
- Teixeira de Freitas, a city in the extreme south of the state of Bahia, Brazil
- De Freitas Wetland, a swamp in Sydney, New South Wales, Australia

== See also ==
- Freitas (disambiguation)
- De Freitas do Amaral (disambiguation)
