= David de Freitas =

David de Freitas may refer to:

- David de Freitas (Brazilian footballer) (born 1986), Brazilian football player
- David de Freitas (French footballer) (born 1979), French football player

== See also ==
- De Freitas (disambiguation)
