= Shelbourne F.C. in European football =

Shelbourne F.C. have a long history in European competitions going back to the early 1960s, taking on clubs such as Sporting Portugal, Barcelona, Atlético Madrid, Panathinaikos, Rangers, Rosenborg, Brøndby, Hajduk Split, Deportivo de La Coruña, Lille, Steaua Bucharest and Ajax.

The club almost made the Champions League group stage in 2004–05, but did make the 2025–26 UEFA Conference League league phase.

== History ==
=== Early European appearances: 1962–1971 ===
Shels debut European appearance was a brief unsuccessful one in the 1962–63 European Cup, losing 0–2 at home in Dalymount Park in front of over 20,000 fans and 1:5 away to Sporting Clube de Portugal, who the following season would go on to win the Cup Winners' Cup.

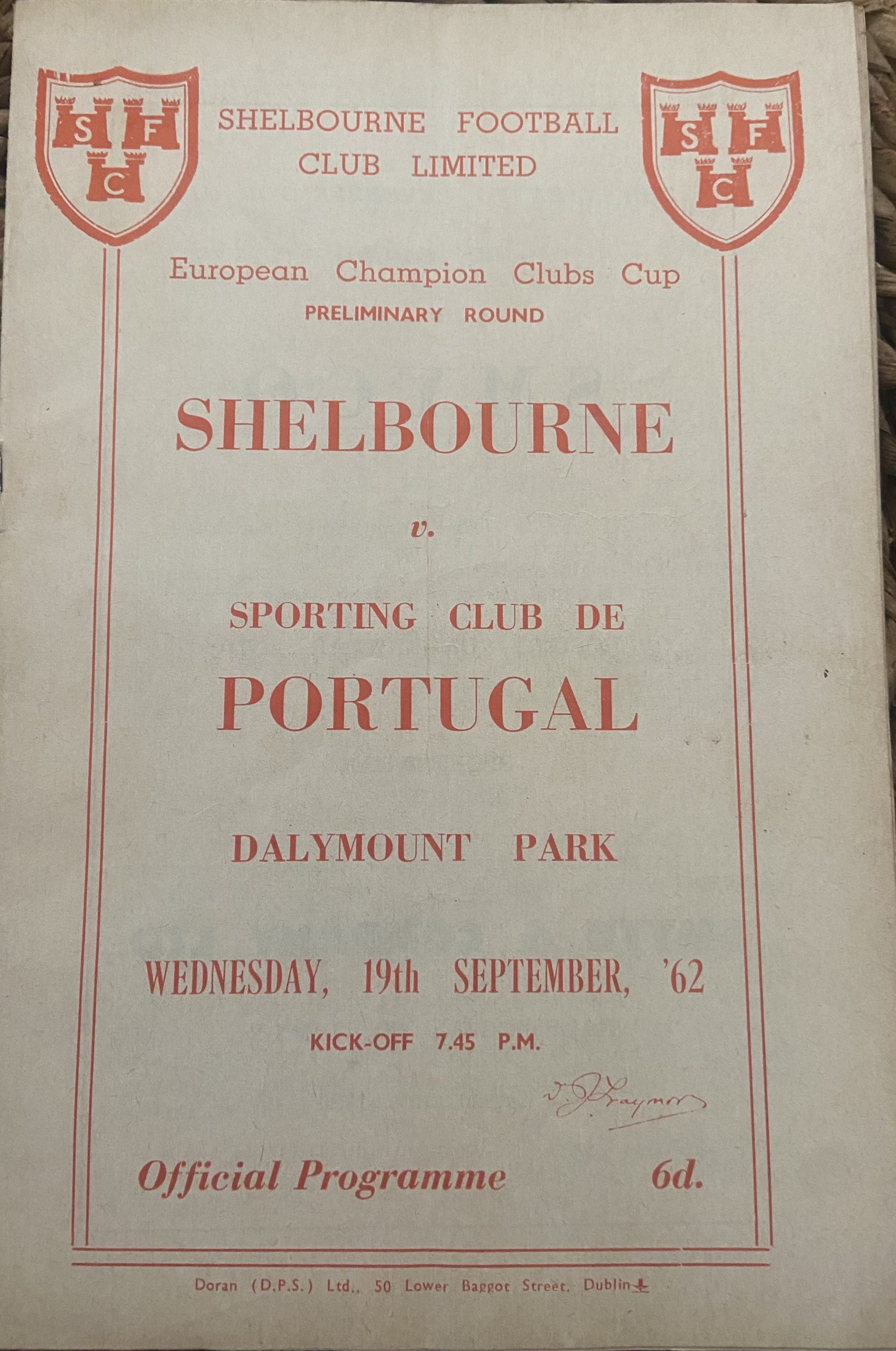
Match programme from the club's European debut in 1962

In the following season's Cup Winners' Cup, Shelbourne faced Barcelona and despite battling bravely were beaten 0–2 at home and 1–3 in the Camp Nou having taken the lead in the latter in the club's first European excursion to Spain. Shels played the second half of the second leg with only ten players as captain Theo Dunne went off injured at half-time.

The Reds returned to Europe once again for a third consecutive season in the 1964–65 Inter-Cities Fairs Cup and faced Portuguese side Belenenses. Shels gained a highly credible 1–1 draw in Lisbon, and drew 0–0 at home. As the away goals rule was not in place at the time, a toss of a coin was held to decide the venue for the play-off. Shels choose correctly, and won the play-off 2–1 giving the League of Ireland its first major scalp in Europe. Facing Atlético Madrid in the second round who had appeared in the last two Cup Winners' Cup finals, they were narrowly beaten 1–0 both at home and at the Estadio Metropolitano de Madrid.

In 1971/72, Shels played Hungarian side Vasas in the first ever competition of the UEFA Cup but lost 1–0 in Budapest and drew 1–1 at home. Following this, Shels next European appearance would be over 20 years later.

=== Relatively recent past: 1992–2003 ===
In the European Cup of 1992/93, despite dominating the home leg, the club's first to be played at Tolka Park, Shels could only draw 0–0 with the first independent Ukrainian champions Tavriya Simferopol following the dissolution of the Soviet Union, and lost the away leg 2–1. The following season Shels exacted revenge on Ukrainian football by knocking out Karpaty Lviv 3–2 on aggregate in the Cup Winners Cup. The home leg which Shels won 3–1, saw Brian Mooney score a stunning 35 yarder on a glorious night for the Reds after a one-goal away defeat. Shels then lost to Panathinaikos 5–1 on aggregate in the next round.

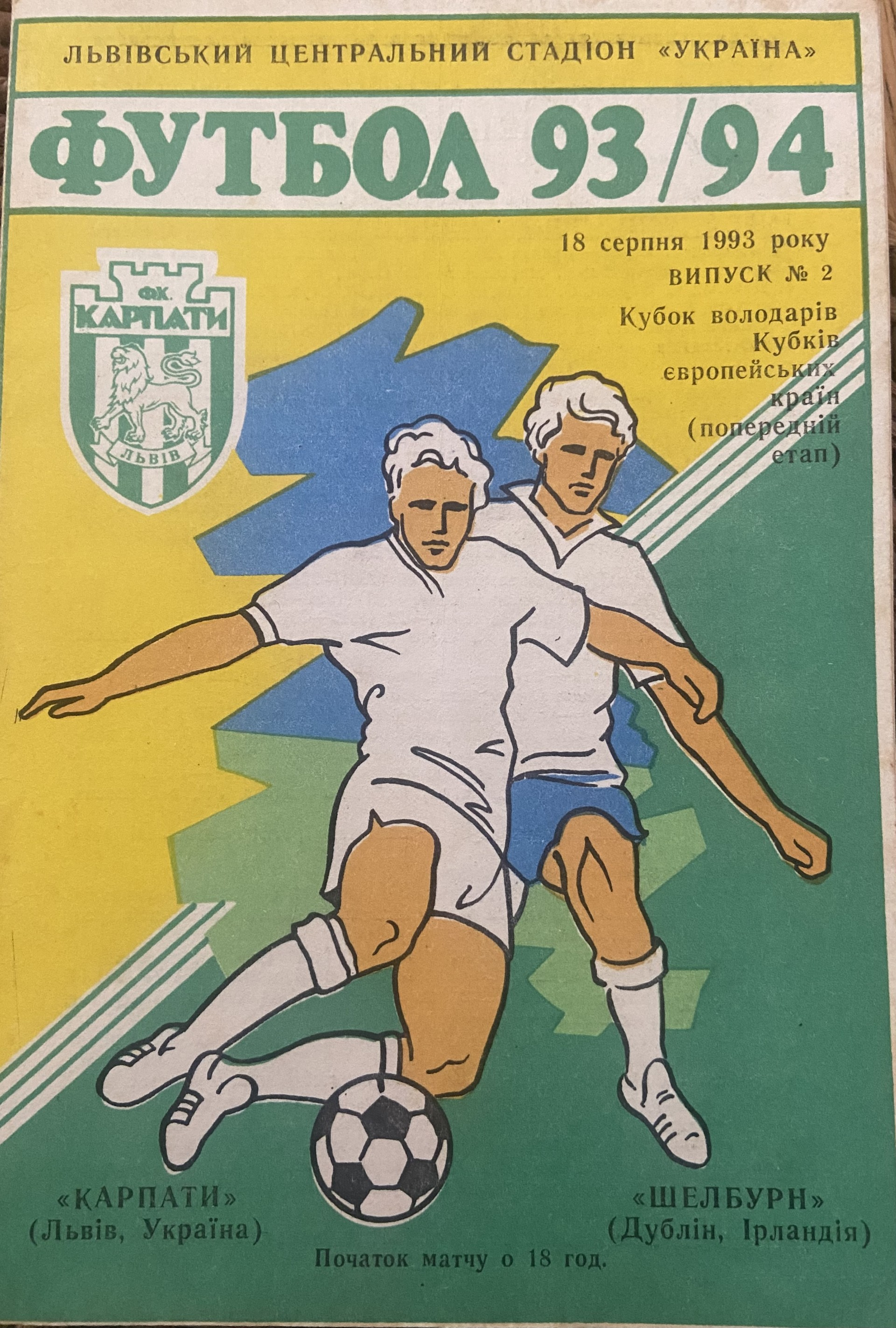
Match programme from away tie versus Kaparty Lviv 18 August 1993

In 1995 and 1996 Shels suffered disappointing defeats home and away to Akranes of Iceland in the UEFA Cup and Norwegian side Brann in the Cup Winners' Cup. In 1997 Shels were drawn to play Scottish side Kilmarnock. Over 600 fans made the trip for the first leg and despite taking the lead through a fantastic goal by Mark Rutherford, Shels lost 2–1 to an injury time goal. Despite dominating the second leg in Tolka Park, it finished 1–1 and Shels were out.

The scoreboard in Prenton Park, just before the hour mark.

In 1998 Shels came up against Rangers in the UEFA Cup. The home leg was moved to Prenton Park, England for security reasons following interference from then Taoiseach Bertie Ahern and despite taking a 3–0 lead, Shels ended up losing 5–3. The return leg in Ibrox Stadium finished 2–0 to Rangers in front of a crowd of 46,906.

In 1999, Shels played in the Intertoto Cup for the first time against Swiss side Neuchâtel Xamax. The home leg finished 0–0 and after missing some great chances early on in the away leg, Shels lost out to two late goals.

In 2000, things started looking up for the Reds in Europe. A late Richie Baker free kick gave Shels a 1–0 away win against Macedonian side Sloga Jugomagnat in the Champions League qualifiers. It was a historic first ever away win in Europe for the Reds, and it was also the first away win in a European tie by a League of Ireland side for eighteen years. In the home leg, winning 1–0 with ten minutes to go, Shels conceded a penalty which was converted. With Sloga only needing one more to progress, Shels survived an injury time scare when defender Owen Heary somehow managed to clear the ball off his own goal line after keeper Steve Williams had been lobbed. It was the first time a League of Ireland side had progressed in Europe's premier club competition since the 1970s.

In the second round against Rosenborg, 10,000 fans crammed into Tolka Park for the first leg, but Shels lost 3–1 despite an excellent performance. The away leg finished 1–1 after Rosenborg grabbed a late equaliser. Richie Foran scored the Reds' goals in both legs.

The home ties against Killie, Rangers and Rosenborg were all broadcast live on Eurosport.

Brøndby were Shels opponents in the UEFA Cup in 2001/02, and the Danes advanced to the next round after winning 2–0 in Brøndby Stadion and 3–0 in Tolka Park.

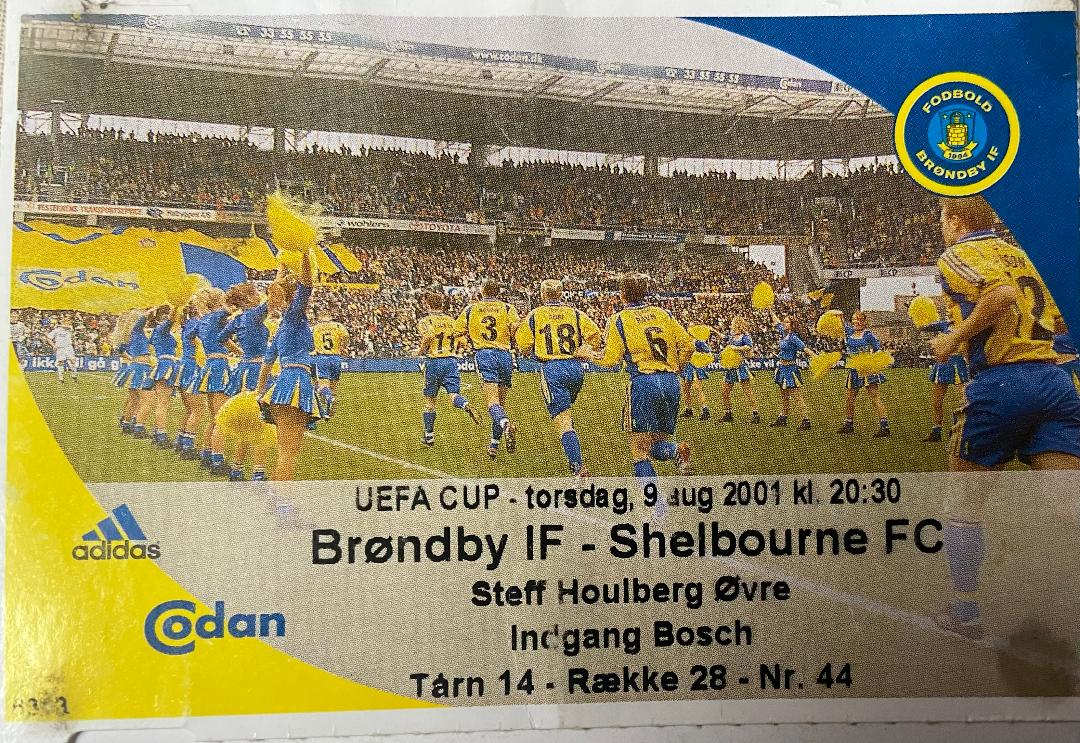
Away Match Ticket Brøndby v Shelbourne UEFA Cup qualifying round 9 August 2001

The following season saw Shels back in the Champions League qualifiers, but after drawing 2–2 away to Hibernians of Malta, conceded an injury time goal at home and missed out on a second round tie with Boavista.

2003 saw Shels play Slovenian side NK Olimpija of Ljubljana in the UEFA Cup, but Shels lost 1–0 at the Bežigrad Stadium and 3–2 at home.

=== UEFA Champions League & UEFA Cup 2004–05 ===
In the 2004–05 European season, they made history, becoming the first Irish club to reach the third qualifying round of the UEFA Champions League. On this run, Shels beat KR Reykjavík on away goals, followed by a 4–3 aggregate victory against Croatian champions Hajduk Split. This historic run only ended with a loss against Spanish giants, Deportivo La Coruña 3–0, having achieved a 0–0 draw in Lansdowne Road in front of 25,000 fans. That season the club also had, what was then, the longest European run in Irish history, after the Champions League exit at the hands of Deportivo the club was entered into the UEFA Cup. There Shels met French side Lille and were beaten 4–2 on aggregate, having come back from a two-goal deficit in Lansdowne Road to achieve a credible draw thanks to a brace from substitute Glen Fitzpatrick.

=== UEFA Champions League 2005–06 ===
Shelbourne team before their game with Steau Bucharest in the 2005–06 UEFA Champions League qualifying rounds.

In the 2005–06 UEFA Champions League First Qualifying Round, they overcame Glentoran of Northern Ireland 6–2 on aggregate, 2–1 to Shelbourne at The Oval in Belfast and 4–1 at home in Tolka Park. Jason Byrne scored a brace home and away, Glen Crowe and Owen Heary getting the others put Shebourne into the second round. It was the club's first time to win both legs in a European tie, and it stands as a record aggregate win for a League of Ireland side in the European Cup/Champions League. They were drawn to play Romanian club and former European Champions Steaua București in the Second Qualifying Round of the Champions League. The first leg took place on 27 July, at home in Tolka Park, in front of a sell-out crowd and it ended in a 0–0 draw. The away leg, one week later on 3 August, saw Shelbourne defeated 4–1 in Stadionul Steaua in Bucharest, mainly due to a number of individual errors. Striker Jason Byrne was, once again, the goal scorer for Shelbourne.

=== Intertoto Cup 2006 ===
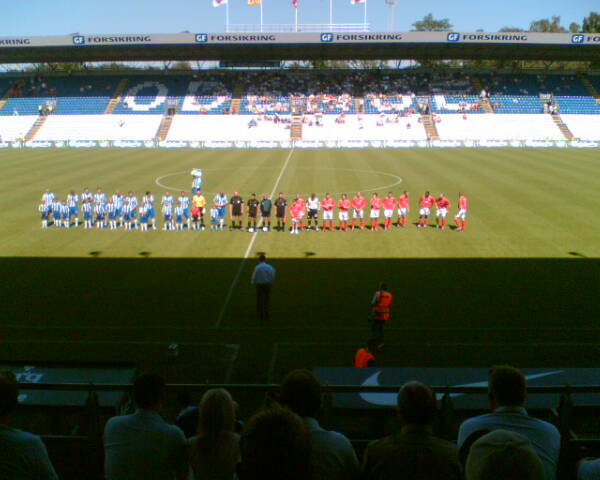
Shelbourne line–out against Odense BK in the second round of the 2006 Intertoto Cup.

2006 saw Shelbourne participate in the UEFA Intertoto Cup. They initially played Lithuanian side Vėtra in the first round, recording a 5–0 aggregate victory. On 18 June Shelbourne won 1–0 at the Vėtra Stadium in Vilnius, courtesy of a Seán Dillon headed goal just before the interval which was also the club's 50th European tie. The second leg took place in Tolka Park on 24 June, with Shelbourne romping to an easy 4–0 home victory over the Lithuanians thanks to goals from Ollie Cahill, Glen Crowe and Jason Byrne adding two more goals to his impressive European tally. Vėtra's severe discipline problems resulted in the Lithuanian side ending the match with only eight players left on the field of play.

Shelbourne played Odense of Denmark in the Second Round, but suffered a 3–0 away defeat in TRE–FOR Park, Odense on 2 July. Shels won the second leg at Tolka Park 1–0 thanks to a goal from Cameroon international Joseph Ndo, losing the tie 3–1 on aggregate. This was to be Shelbourne's last European game before their demotion to the League of Ireland First Division. The 1–0 victory in Tolka Park meant Shelbourne became unbeaten in their last eight home European matches.

=== UEFA Champions League 2007–08 ===
Despite winning the League of Ireland championship in November 2006, Shelbourne announced on 29 March 2007 that they would not be applying for a UEFA licence to compete in the 2007–08 Champions League first qualifying round. The club was demoted to the First Division by the FAI before the start of the 2007 season due to ongoing financial problems and it was unlikely they would have secured the necessary licence to take part in the competition. This ended the club's run of twelve successive appearances in UEFA competition.

=== 2024 Return To Europe ===
After an 18-year absence, the Reds returned to Europe during the summer of 2024 to make their debut in the UEFA Conference League and were drawn as the unseeded side against St Joseph's from Gibraltar. Shels won the home leg in Tolka Park 2–1 with goals from Mark Coyle, after just 27 seconds, and Will Jarvis in front of a sold-out crowd of 3,655. Shels progressed on aggregate following a 1–1 draw at the Europa Sports Park. Sam Bone got the crucial goal to make the difference after St Joseph's had equalised the aggregate score.

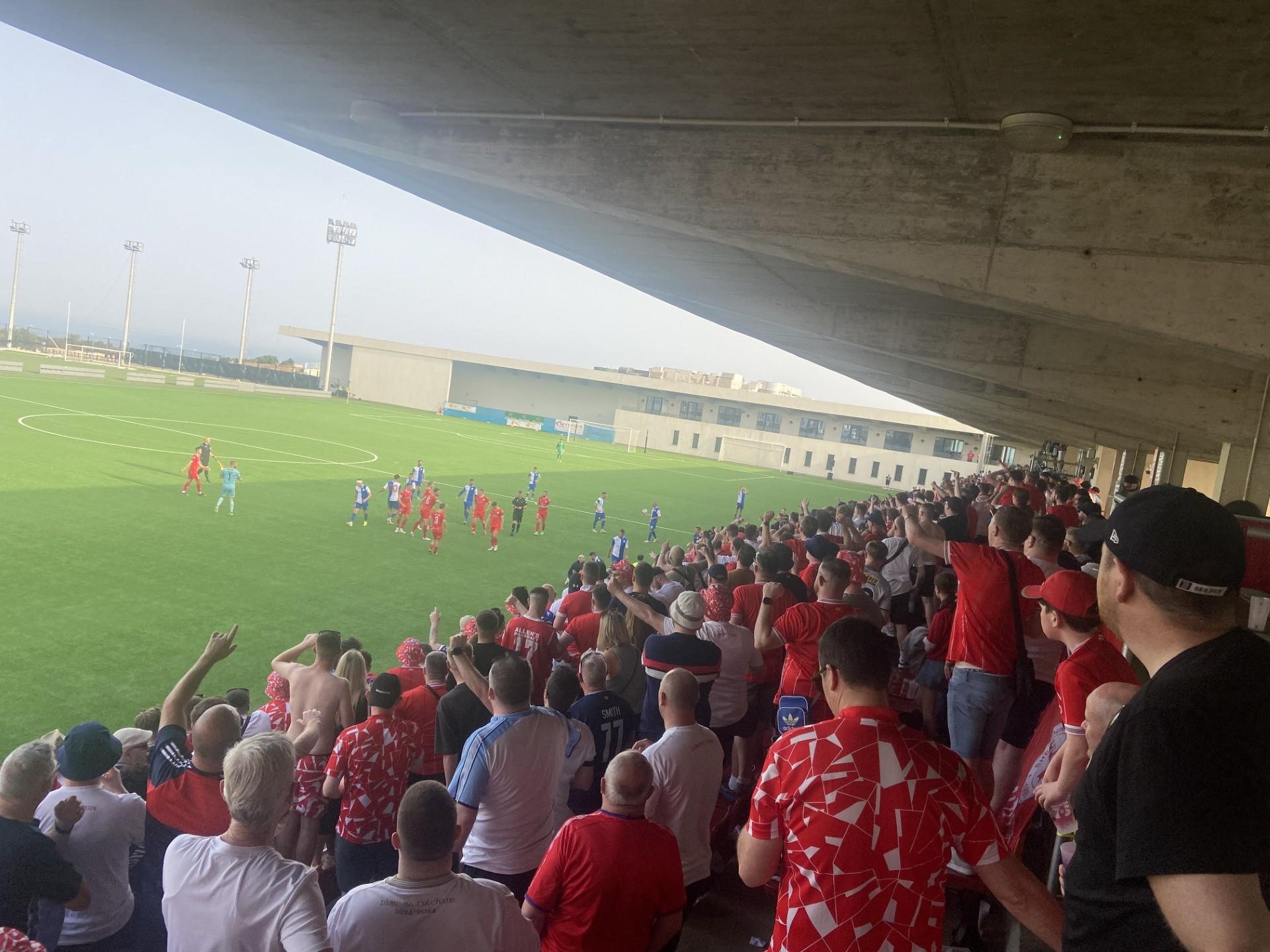
St Joseph's v Shelbourne Europa Sports Park 18 July 2024

In the second qualifying round, Shels were beaten 0–3 by Zürich in the away leg, but extended their European home unbeaten run as the second leg finished scoreless.

=== 2025/26 League Phase Debut ===
In 2025, Shels returned to the UEFA Champions League for the first time in two decades with a first leg 1:0 win over Linfield. Mipo Odubeko got the only goal in the first leg at Tolka Park. The Reds, backed by 1,300 travelling fans, progressed to the second qualifying round following a 1:1 draw in Windsor Park. Ali Coote gave Shels an early lead, Linfield pulled a goal back in first-half injury time, then the Blues had a player sent off in the second half.

In the second qualify round first leg, Shels long unbeaten home European record was finally ended by Qarabağ who inflicted a 3:0 defeat on the hosts. Two goals in the last ten minutes finished off the game in which the Reds failed to put away their own chances. Shels parachuted from the competition to the 2025–26 UEFA Europa League qualifying rounds was confirmed after a single goal defeat in Baku in front of over 25,000 fans. The only goal came just before half-time through an own goal by John Martin, with debutant goalkeeper Wessel Speel, one of eight changes to the side from the first leg, making a second half penalty save.

In the UEFA Europa League third qualifying round first leg, Shels came from a goal down against Rijeka to win 2–1 away from home with goals coming from Sam Bone, and John Martin. In the second leg at Tolka Park, Shels were beaten 1–3. Despite Odubeko scoring a late penalty to level the aggregate score, Rijeka scored in the ninetieth minute to progress and send the Reds in to the Conference League play-off round.

Shels would meet Linfield again in the play-off round with the first leg once again in Tolka Park. Shels won an enthralling first leg by three goals to one. A Harry Wood penalty just before half-time opened the scoring with Odebku and Evan Caffrey getting on target in the second half. Linfield had a man dismissed with a straight red card in the 18th minute and both sides missed penalties.

Shelbourne would win the second leg in Windsor Park 2–0. Two first half goals from Harry Wood and Ali Coote would give the team a 5–1 lead on aggregate, and Shelbourne progressed to the league phase of the UEFA Conference League, the club's first ever league phase/group stages European qualification, and only the third Irish club to do so.

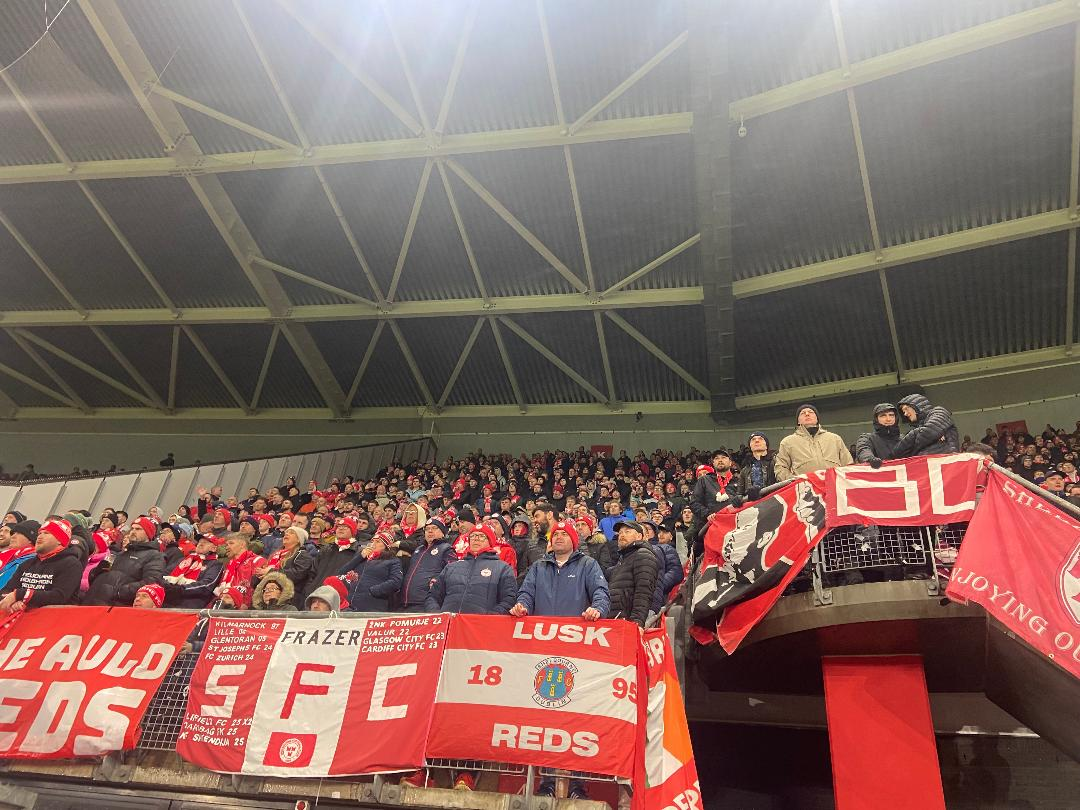
Shelbourne fans at AZ away, 27 November 2025

In the league phase, Shels drew their opening match against Swedish side Häcken 0–0 on a rain soaked evening at Tallaght Stadium. On matchday two, Shels were beaten 0–1 in Skopje by Shkëndija by an injury time own goal. Back in Tallaght Stadium on matchday three, Shels went down to a 0:1 defeat to Drita. James Norris was sent off after just fifteen minutes and the visitors won the game thanks to a second half goal that took a double deflection. On matchday four, Shels went down to two late goals away to AZ in Alkmaar. In the Reds final home game of the league phase, they faced English opposition for the first time in European competition, but were beaten 0:3 by FA Cup holders Crystal Palace. The attendance of 10,143 saw a new record crowd for a competitive game at Tallaght Stadium. On the final match day, the Reds travelled to Slovenia to play Celje. The game finished 0:0 meaning Shels finished 34th out of 36 teams, ahead of Aberdeen and Rapid Wien.

=== UEFA Conference League 2026/27 ===
Following the side's third place league finish in the 2025 League of Ireland Premier Division, Shels started as an unseeded side in the second qualifying round facing Estonian opposition for the first time in the form of Nõmme Kalju. The Reds cruised to a 5:2 first leg win at Tolka Park with goals coming from Rodrigo Freitas, Sean Moore (a brace), Ali Coote, and academy graduate Dan Ring. In the away leg which was played at the Pärnu Rannastaadion, The Reds took the lead through Dan Kelly, but lost 1:2 on the night, yet progressed 6:4 on aggregate.

In the third qualifying round, the Reds faced Ajax. The first leg at the Johan Cruyff Arena in front of a crowd of 51,871 saw the hosts rack up a 3:1 first leg lead. At 3:0, Shels keeper Eddie Beach saved a penalty and shortly later, Danno Kelly pulled a goal back. Shels were eliminated following following a highly credible 2:2 draw in Tolka Park. An Evan Caffrey shot was deflected off Rodrigo Freitas (the latter was credited by UEFA with the goal) to equalise in the first half, with Sean Moore getting a second equaliser in the last few minutes.

=== Overview ===
Competition	P	W	D	L	GF	GA	Last season played
European Cup / UEFA Champions League	24	5	9	10	23	36	2025–26
Inter-Cities Fairs Cup	5	1	2	2	3	4	1964–65
UEFA Cup/UEFA Europa League	14	1	2	11	11	32	2025–26
European Cup Winners' Cup / UEFA Cup Winners' Cup	10	1	1	8	9	20	1997–98
UEFA Intertoto Cup	6	3	1	2	6	5	2006
UEFA Conference League	16	4	5	7	17	22	2026-27
TOTAL	75	15	20	40	69	119	

=== Matches ===
Season	Competition	Round	Opponent	Home	Away	Aggregate	Playoff
1962–63	European Cup	PR	(Portugal) Sporting CP	0–2	1–5	1–7	n/a
1963–64	European Cup Winners' Cup	PR	(Spain) Barcelona	0–2	1–3	1–5	n/a
1964–65	Inter-Cities Fairs Cup	1R	(Portugal) Belenenses	0–0	1–1	1–1	2–1
1964–65	Inter-Cities Fairs Cup	2R	(Spain) Atlético Madrid	0–1	0–1	0–2	n/a
1971–72	UEFA Cup	1R	(Hungary) Vasas	1–1	0–1	1–2	n/a
1992–93	UEFA Champions League	PR	(Ukraine) Tavriya Simferopol	0–0	1–2	1–2	n/a
1993–94	European Cup Winners' Cup	PR	(Ukraine) Karpaty Lviv	3–1	0–1	3–2	n/a
1993–94	European Cup Winners' Cup	1R	(Greece) Panathinaikos	1–2	0–3	1–5	n/a
1995–96	UEFA Cup	PR	(Iceland) ÍA	0–3	0–3	0–6	n/a
1996–97	UEFA Cup Winners' Cup	PR	(Norway) Brann	1–3	1–2	2–5	n/a
1997–98	UEFA Cup Winners' Cup	PR	(Scotland) Kilmarnock	1–1	1–2	2–3	n/a
1998–99	UEFA Cup	1QR	(Scotland) Rangers	3–5	0–2	3–7	n/a
1999	UEFA Intertoto Cup	1R	(Switzerland) Neuchâtel Xamax	0–0	0–2	0–2	n/a
2000–01	UEFA Champions League	1QR	(North Macedonia) Sloga Jugomagnat	1–1	1–0	2–1	n/a
2000–01	UEFA Champions League	2QR	(Norway) Rosenborg	1–3	1–1	2–4	n/a
2001–02	UEFA Cup	PR	(Denmark) Brøndby	0–3	0–2	0–5	n/a
2002–03	UEFA Champions League	1QR	(Malta) Hibernians	0–1	2–2	2–3	n/a
2003–04	UEFA Cup	PR	(Slovenia) Olimpija Ljubljana	2–3	0–1	2–4	n/a
2004–05	UEFA Champions League	1QR	(Iceland) KR	0–0	2–2	2–2 (a)	n/a
2004–05	UEFA Champions League	2QR	(Croatia) Hajduk Split	2–0	2–3	4–3	n/a
2004–05	UEFA Champions League	3QR	(Spain) Deportivo La Coruña	0–0	0–3	0–3	n/a
2004–05	UEFA Cup	1R	(France) Lille	2–2	0–2	2–4	n/a
2005–06	UEFA Champions League	1QR	(Northern Ireland) Glentoran	4–1	2–1	6–2	n/a
2005–06	UEFA Champions League	2QR	(Romania) Steaua București	0–0	1–4	1–4	n/a
2006	UEFA Intertoto Cup	1R	(Lithuania) Vėtra	4–0	1–0	5–0	n/a
2006	UEFA Intertoto Cup	2R	(Denmark) Odense	1–0	0–3	1–3	n/a
2024–25	UEFA Conference League	1QR	(Gibraltar) St Joseph's	2–1	1–1	3–2	n/a
2024–25	UEFA Conference League	2QR	(Switzerland) Zürich	0–0	0–3	0–3	n/a
2025–26	UEFA Champions League	1QR	(Northern Ireland) Linfield	1–0	1–1	2–1	n/a
2025–26	UEFA Champions League	2QR	(Azerbaijan) Qarabağ	0–3	0–1	0–4	n/a
2025–26	UEFA Europa League	3QR	(Croatia) Rijeka	1–3	2–1	3–4	n/a
2025–26	UEFA Conference League	PO	(Northern Ireland) Linfield	3–1	2–0	5–1	n/a
2025–26	UEFA Conference League	LP	(Sweden) Häcken	0–0	—N/a	34th out of 36	n/a
2025–26	UEFA Conference League	LP	(North Macedonia) Shkëndija	—N/a	0–1	34th out of 36	n/a
2025–26	UEFA Conference League	LP	(Kosovo) Drita	0–1	—N/a	34th out of 36	n/a
2025–26	UEFA Conference League	LP	(Netherlands) AZ	—N/a	0–2	34th out of 36	n/a
2025–26	UEFA Conference League	LP	(England) Crystal Palace	0–3	—N/a	34th out of 36	n/a
2025–26	UEFA Conference League	LP	(Slovenia) Celje	—N/a	0–0	34th out of 36	n/a
2026-27	UEFA Conference League	2QR	(Estonia) Nõmme Kalju	5–2	1–2	6–4	n/a
2026-27	UEFA Conference League	3QR	(Netherlands) Ajax	2–2	1–3	3–5	n/a

== Home Stadia ==
All home European games from 1962 to 1971 were played at Dalymount Park.

Since 1992 inclusive all home European games have been at Tolka Park except Rangers in 1998 played at Prenton Park in England for security reasons and both Deportivo de la Coruña and Lille in 2004 were played at Lansdowne Road.

Home 2025-26 Conference League league phase games were played at Tallaght Stadium.

== Statistics ==
- Biggest European Win:
  - single tie: 4–0 vs Vėtra home, 24 June 2006
  - aggregate: 5–0 vs Vėtra, June 2006
- Top European scorer:
  - season: 5, Jason Byrne, (2005/06)
  - total: 8, Jason Byrne, (2003–06)
- Fastest goal scored:
  - Mark Coyle, 27 seconds vs St Joseph's, 11 July 2024
- Fastest goal conceded:
  - Ifeanyi Onyedika, 27 seconds vs Zürich 25 July 2024
- Shelbourne have knocked out the following sides:
  - (Portugal) Belenenses – Inter-Cities Fairs Cup
  - (Ukraine) Karpaty Lviv – UEFA Cup Winners Cup
  - (North Macedonia) Sloga Jugomagnat – UEFA Champions League
  - (Iceland) KR Reykjavik – UEFA Champions League
  - (Croatia) Hajduk Split – UEFA Champions League
  - (Northern Ireland) Glentoran – UEFA Champions League
  - (Lithuania) Vėtra – UEFA Intertoto Cup
  - (Gibraltar) St Joseph's – UEFA Conference League
  - (Northern Ireland) Linfield – UEFA Champions League
  - (Northern Ireland) Linfield – UEFA Conference League
  - (Estonia) Nõmme Kalju – UEFA Conference League
- Shelbourne were unbeaten in 11 home games in European competition, a record for an Irish club, from 2004 to 2025. The teams played in this run were:
  - (Iceland) KR Reykjavik, 0–0
  - (Croatia) Hajduk Split, 2–0
  - (Spain) Deportivo La Coruña, 0–0
  - (France) Lille, 2–2
  - (Northern Ireland) Glentoran, 4–1
  - (Romania) Steaua București, 0–0
  - (Lithuania) Vėtra, 4–0
  - (Denmark) Odense, 1–0
  - (Gibraltar) St Joseph's, 2–1
  - (Switzerland) Zürich, 0–0
  - (Northern Ireland) Linfield, 1–0
- Shelbourne have won a total of 15 ties in all European competitions:
  - (Portugal) Belenenses – Inter-Cities Fairs Cup 1st Round 1963/1964- H 2–1
  - (Ukraine) Karpaty Lviv – Cup Winners' Cup Preliminary Round 1993/1994- H 3–1
  - (North Macedonia) Sloga Jugomagnat – Champions League 1st Qualifying Round 2000/2001 A 1–0
  - (Croatia) Hajduk Split – Champions League 2nd Qualifying Round 2004/2005 – H 2–0
  - (Northern Ireland) Glentoran – Champions League 1st Qualifying Round 2005/2006 – A 2–1 – H 4–1
  - (Lithuania) Vėtra – Intertoto Cup 1st Round 2006 – A 1–0 – H 4–0
  - (Denmark) Odense – Intertoto Cup 2nd Round 2006 – H 1–0
  - (Gibraltar) St Joseph's – Conference League 1st Qualifying Round 2024/2025 – H 2–1
  - (Northern Ireland) Linfield – Champions League 1st Qualifying Round 2025/26 – H 1–0
  - (Croatia) Rijeka – Europa League 3rd Qualifying Round 2025/26 – A 2–1
  - (Northern Ireland) Linfield – Conference League Play–off Round 2025/26 – H 3–1 – A 2–0
  - (Estonia) Nõmme Kalju – Conference League 2nd Qualifying Round 2026/27 – H 5–2
- Shelbourne's 4–0 home win over Vėtra in June 2006 equalled the highest win by a League of Ireland side in a single European tie.
- Shelbourne were the first Irish club to reach the 3rd qualifying round of the Champions League and were the only team to reach the 3rd qualifying round until the qualifying rounds were restructured for the 2009–10 Champions League qualifying phase.
- Shelbourne have faced the representatives of 25 national associations with Spanish and Northern Irish sides being the most frequent opponents on 3 occasions.
- Linfield are the only opposition Shels have been drawn against on more than one occasion, with the sides meeting twice in different competitions in the 2025/26 season.
- Shelbourne have competed in 6 European competitions in 21 different seasons.
- Shelbourne are one of only 3 League of Ireland clubs to have qualified for the Group stages/League phase of European football along with Shamrock Rovers and Dundalk.

=== UEFA ranking ===
Shelbourne were ranked in the top 250 until 2006. As of 2026 they are ranked 276.

==== Current club ranking ====
- 274 (Israel) Maccabi Petah Tikva
- 275 (Israel) Maccabi Netanya
- 276 (Republic of Ireland) Shelbourne
- 277 (San Marino) AC Virtus
- 278 (Bosnia and Herzegovina) FK Sarajevo

- Full List

===== Current national league UEFA ranking =====
Correct as of 2026

- 31 Iceland
- 32 (Republic of Ireland) Ireland
- 33 Armenia

- Full list

== UEFA Youth League ==
Shelbourne's under-19 side took part in the UEFA Youth League for the first time in the 2025-26 season. They met Rabotnicki from North Macedonia in the first round with the Young Reds progressing 12:1 on aggregate following a 5:0 win in Tolka Park and a 7:1 win in Skopje.

In the second round first leg, the young Reds faced Slovakian side Žilina and despite trailing 0:2 early on, drew 2:2. A 0:0 draw in the second leg after 90 minutes, during which the Žilina goalkeeper was sent off for handling outside the box, denying a direct goalscoring opportunity, saw Shelbourne exit in 0:2 penalty shoot-out defeat.

=== External links ===
Official site:

- ShelsWeb

Independent Supporters Group:

- RedsIndependent.com
- The Real Reds & Shels TV
