= Pedro Henrique =

Pedro Henrique may refer to:

== Politicians ==
- Prince Pedro Henrique of Orléans-Braganza (1909–1981), great-grandson of the last emperor of Brazil

== Sportspeople ==
- Pedro Henrique (footballer, born October 1985), Brazilian football goalkeeper
- Pedro Henrique (footballer, born November 1985), Brazilian football striker
- Pedro Henrique (footballer, born 1990), Brazilian football winger for Corinthians
- Pedro Henrique Oliveira (born 1992), East Timorese football forward for Sri Pahang FC
- Pedro Henrique (footballer, born December 1992), Brazilian football centre-back for Atlético Goianiense
- Pedro Henrique (footballer, born September 1992), Brazilian football centre-back for Tanjong Pagar United
- Pedro Henrique (footballer, born 1995), Brazilian football defender for Athletico Paranaense
- Pedro Henrique (footballer, born 1996), Brazilian football forward for Khor Fakkan
- Pedro Henrique (footballer, born 1997), Brazilian football forward for Thể Công-Viettel
- Pedro Henrique (footballer, born 2001), Brazilian football defender for Guarani
- Pedro Henrique (footballer, born 2003), Brazilian football defender for Portuguesa
