= Tommy Carroll (footballer) =

Irish footballer (1942–2020)

Personal information
- Full name: Thomas Roger Carroll
- Date of birth: 18 August 1942
- Place of birth: Dublin, Ireland
- Date of death: 16 August 2020 (aged 77)
- Position: Defender

Senior career*
Years	Team	Apps	(Gls)
1957–1963	Shelbourne		(4)
1963–1966	Cambridge City	101	(1)
1966–1971	Ipswich Town	117	(2)
1971–1973	Birmingham City	38	(0)
1975–1976	Shelbourne	0	(0)
1976–1977	Athlone Town	1	(0)

International career
1966	Republic of Ireland U23	1	(0)
1968–1973	Republic of Ireland	17	(1)

Managerial career
- 1975–1976: Shelbourne
- 1976–1977: Athlone Town
- * Club domestic league appearances and goals

Thomas Roger Carroll (18 August 1942 – 16 August 2020) was an Irish international footballer.

Carroll was born in Dublin, and was 15 when he made his debut for Shelbourne, alongside his elder brother Eddie. During seven years at Tolka Park he won the League of Ireland Championship and the FAI Cup.

He moved to Cambridge City in October 1963, making 170 first team appearances in all competitions during his spell at Milton Road. Played in the first ever Republic of Ireland U23 game in 1966. He then moved to Ipswich Town in July 1966 and played for the club at right full back for six seasons, including winning the 2nd Division title under the management of Bill McGarry before falling out with Bobby Robson. He was replaced by Geoff Hammond and soon after moved on to Birmingham City in November 1971.

He represented his country 17 times scoring once. He also won three amateur caps.

He managed Shels for most of the 1975/76 season following the departure of the long-serving Gerry Doyle. In December 1976 he was appointed player/manager of Athlone Town in succession to Trevor Hockey.

Carroll's death at the age of 77 was reported on 16 August 2020.

== Honours ==
- League of Ireland
  - Shelbourne 1961–62
- FAI Cup
  - Shelbourne 1963

== Sources ==
- Stephen McGarrigle (1996). The Complete Who's Who of Irish International Football, 1945-96. [2]
