= Shelbourne F.C. =

Association football club in Ireland

Shelbourne
- Full name: Shelbourne Football Club
- Nickname: The Reds
- Short name: Shels
- Founded: 1895; 131 years ago
- Stadium: Tolka Park
- Capacity: 6,450
- Owner(s): TDL Media Ltd, TFNI Ltd, Brian McGovern, Richard Walsh, Larry Bass, SMT Trust, Closebreak Ltd
- Chairman: Mickey O'Rourke
- Head coach: John Russell
- League: League of Ireland Premier Division
- 2025: 3rd of 10
- Website: shelbournefc.ie
Home colours	Away colours	Third colours

Shelbourne Football Club is an Irish professional football club based in Drumcondra, Dublin, currently playing in the League of Ireland Premier Division.

== Overview ==
The club plays its home matches at Tolka Park, in the Dublin suburb of Drumcondra. Founded in Dublin in 1895, Shelbourne F.C.'s colours are primarily red and white, with home jerseys being predominantly red though in the club's first season they wore sky blue and chocolate following an error with the kit order.

In 1904, the club joined the Irish Football League, which was then an all-Ireland competition, before becoming one of the founding members of the League of Ireland in 1921, winning their first title in the 1925–26 season. Shelbourne have won the league 14 times and are one of three clubs to have won both the IFA Cup and the FAI Cup. In the 2004–05 European season, Shelbourne became the first Irish club to reach the third qualifying round of the UEFA Champions League.

The club lost their Premier Division licence for the 2007 season due to the club's debt situation. Although the club was saved, since then, Shelbourne had mainly played in the second tier of the League of Ireland with short stints back in the Premier Division in 2012, 2013 and 2020. The club was promoted back to the Premier Division in 2021 and have been competing back in the top flight since then, winning the Premier Division in 2024, and subsequently qualifying for the 2025–26 UEFA Conference League league phase.

== History ==
=== Formation & IFA years: 1895–1921 ===
Shelbourne Football Club was formed in 1895 in the Ringsend area of Dublin by a group of men led by James Rowan, a general labourer. The club's first meeting was held at the corner of Bath Avenue in the Shelbourne House hostelry, known as of 2017 as Slattery's Pub, and took its name from the nearby Shelbourne Road. The club's first pitch was at Havelock Square just behind the north stand at the present day Aviva Stadium.

Shelbourne's second season, 1896–97, was their first in competitive competition. Shelbourne played 28 matches, won 25, drew two and lost one. Their goal tally was 109 for and 15 against. Shelbourne won the principal junior competitions, the Leinster Junior Cup and Leinster Junior League. The club decided to enter the senior ranks for the 1897–98 season and reached the Leinster Senior Cup final at their first attempt, only to lose to Bohemians. The club joined the Irish League for the start of the 1904–05 season.

The club made it to the final of the IFA Cup in 1905 but were beaten by Distillery. The following year Shelbourne defeated Belfast Celtic in the Cup Final 2–0 at Dalymount Park before a crowd of 7,000 thanks to a brace from James Owens and became the first Southern club to win the IFA Cup. According to a Dublin newspaper "Tar barrels and bonfires were blazing across Ringsend and Sandymount that night as the Irish Cup was paraded around the district". In the same year, Shelbourne player Val Harris became the club's first player to line out for Ireland. In 1906 Shelbourne won their fourth Leinster Senior Cup, the club also playing in a charity match against Bohemians the same year and raised more than 100 pounds to build a church in Ringsend. Shelbourne reached the IFA Cup Final again in 1907 and 1908 but were beaten on both occasions in replays against Cliftonville and Bohemians, respectively. In 1907 Shelbourne were also Irish Football League runners-up to Linfield. They won the Leinster Senior Cup again in 1908 and 1909. In 1909 Shelbourne were City Cup winners and finished third place in the Irish Football League, behind champions Linfield and Glentoran. In 1911 Shelbourne won the IFA Cup for their second time and went on to win the Leinster Senior Cup again in 1913 and 1914. In 1912, the club established the Shelbourne Sports Company, a limited public liability company with the specific aim of constructing a stadium of holding 25,000 spectators. It was wound up eleven years later without having achieved its goal. Shelbourne were 1914 Gold Cup runners-up, and then winners in 1915, were Leinster Senior Cup winners again in 1917 and 1919, and winners of the IFA Cup once more, in 1920, after the other semi-final was declared void as both of the teams involved (Belfast Celtic and Glentoran) were ejected from the competition, before Shelbourne's association with the Irish Football Association was to come to an end. The Reds semi-final win over Glenavon saw their home ground closed by authorities following crowd violence.

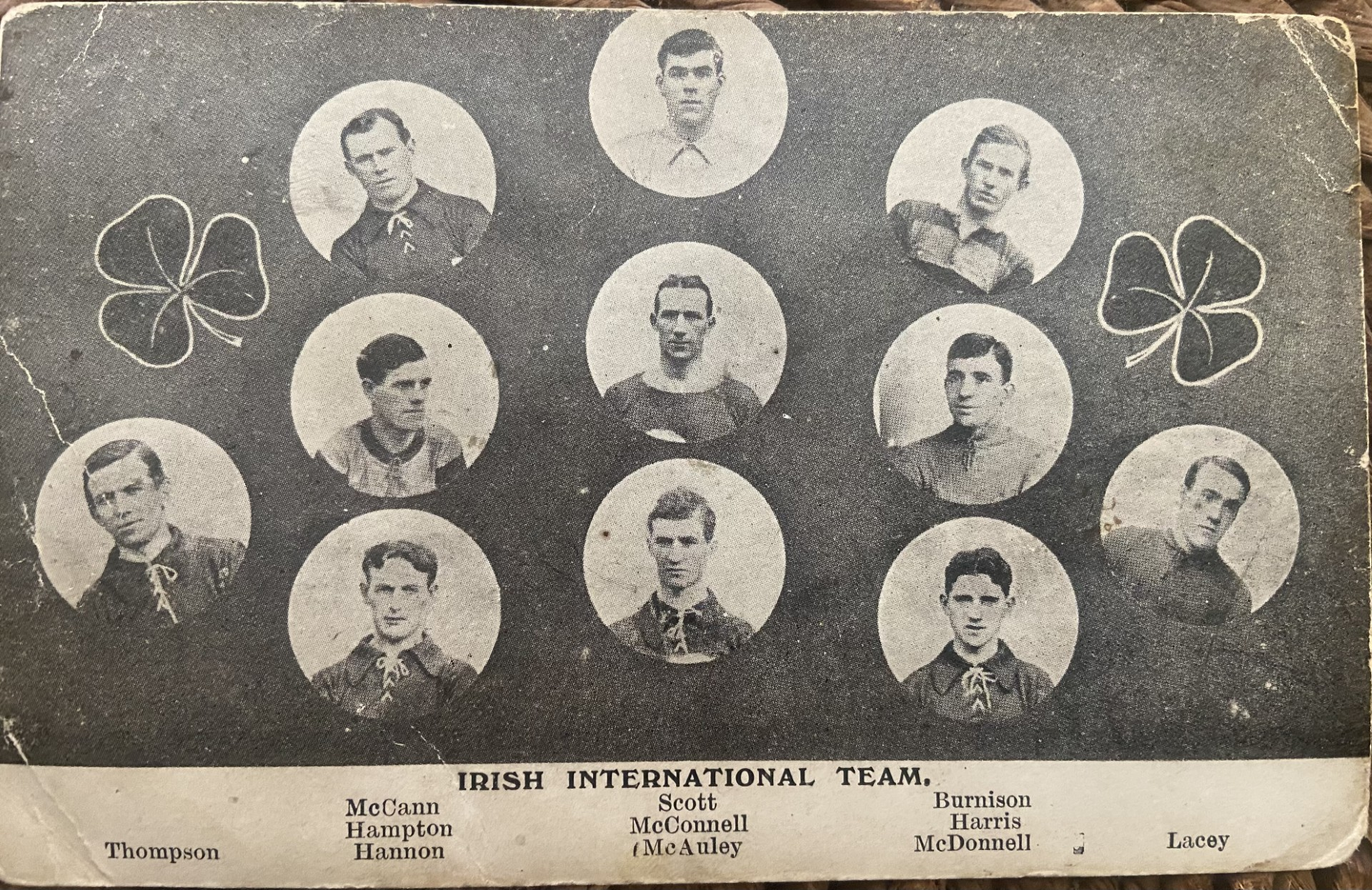
Val Harris was the first Shelbourne player to become a full international in 1906

=== Founder Members of the League of Ireland: 1921–1929 ===
Additional reading: IFA#North-South Split

Following the Anglo-Irish Treaty, Partition of Ireland and establishment of the Irish Free State, the League of Ireland was formed for clubs in the 26 counties of Ireland that had regained independence from the United Kingdom. The immediate cause of the split lay in a bitter dispute over the venue for the replay of an Irish Cup match in 1921 involving Glentoran of Belfast and Shelbourne. When the first cup match was drawn in Belfast, because of the Irish war of independence, the IFA reneged on a promise to play the replay in Dublin and scheduled the rematch again for Belfast. Shelbourne refused to comply and forfeited the Cup. Such was the anger over the issue that the Leinster FA broke away from the IFA and formed its own national association, the present-day Football Association of Ireland. Shelbourne became one of the original League of Ireland founder clubs along with Bohemians, St James's Gate, Jacobs, Olympia, Frankfort, Dublin United and YMCA.

In the opening 1921–22 season, Shelbourne finished in third place behind winners St James's Gate and Bohemians. Shelbourne finished runners-up the following two seasons and won the 1924 Leinster Senior Cup. The Reds finished third in the league again in the 1924–25 season before winning the league for their first time the following season in 1925–26. They finished runners-up the following two years before winning the 1928–29 Championship.

Chart of yearly table positions for Shelbourne in League of Ireland

=== Thirties: 1930–1939 ===
Additional reading: Reds United

Having failed to retain the title in 1930, Shels won their third league title in 1931 and were Leinster Senior Cup winners that same year. In 1934 the club got into a dispute with the Irish Free State F.A. when they looked for compensation after the FAIFS had arranged a match for the same day that Shelbourne had a match scheduled. In the row that followed, Shels resigned from the League and were then suspended from football for a year by the FAI. The club played no football during the 1934–35 season and spent the 1935–36 season in the Athletic Union League before being re-admitted to the League of Ireland for the start of the 1936–37 season. During the 1935–36 season a team called Reds United, made up of a number of Shelbourne players and backed by Shels personnel, competed in the League of Ireland and finished fourth. At the end of the season, they resigned from the League to make way for Shelbourne's return.

Success in the FAI Cup finally arrived. Sligo Rovers who boasted Dixie Dean, the goalscoring legend of the Football League, were eventually beaten after a replay thanks to a long-range goal from 'Sacky' Glen. After so many attempts, the blue ribbon of Irish football made its way to Shelbourne Park for the first time.

=== Forties: 1940–1949 ===
The forties started slowly enough for the Reds, and it wasn't until 1944 that the league championship was won again — for a fourth time — along with the Shield. The title was clinched after a 5–3 win over Shamrock Rovers. Luck was reversed though in the FAI Cup Final as Rovers stopped the Reds from winning the treble. Shelbourne went down 3–2 . Shels won another Leinster Senior Cup in 1946. Another league title, was wrapped up on the last day in 1947 and was again secured against Shamrock Rovers.

In April 1949, Shelbourne drew 2–2 against Waterford in what was the club's final competitive game at Shelbourne Park. The plan was that the club would build a new stadium in nearby Irishtown. The 1948–49 season also saw Shels win their seventh Shield and 14th Leinster Senior Cup.

=== Fifties: 1950–1959 ===
In 1951, Shelbourne made it to the FAI Cup final where they met Cork Athletic who had already wrapped up the league. Tommy Carberry had scored in every round for the Reds and did so again in the final, played in front of over 38,900 fans, but it was only good enough to earn a replay which Athletic won. At the end of the 1950-51 season, the club travelled across the Irish Sea to play in the Festival Of Britain tournament. A sixth league title was won in 1953, and then in 1955–56 Shels played their only season in Irishtown Stadium. The ground, however, was far from complete and offered no shelter for the fans from the elements. The following season Shelbourne were tenants across the bay at Tolka Park.

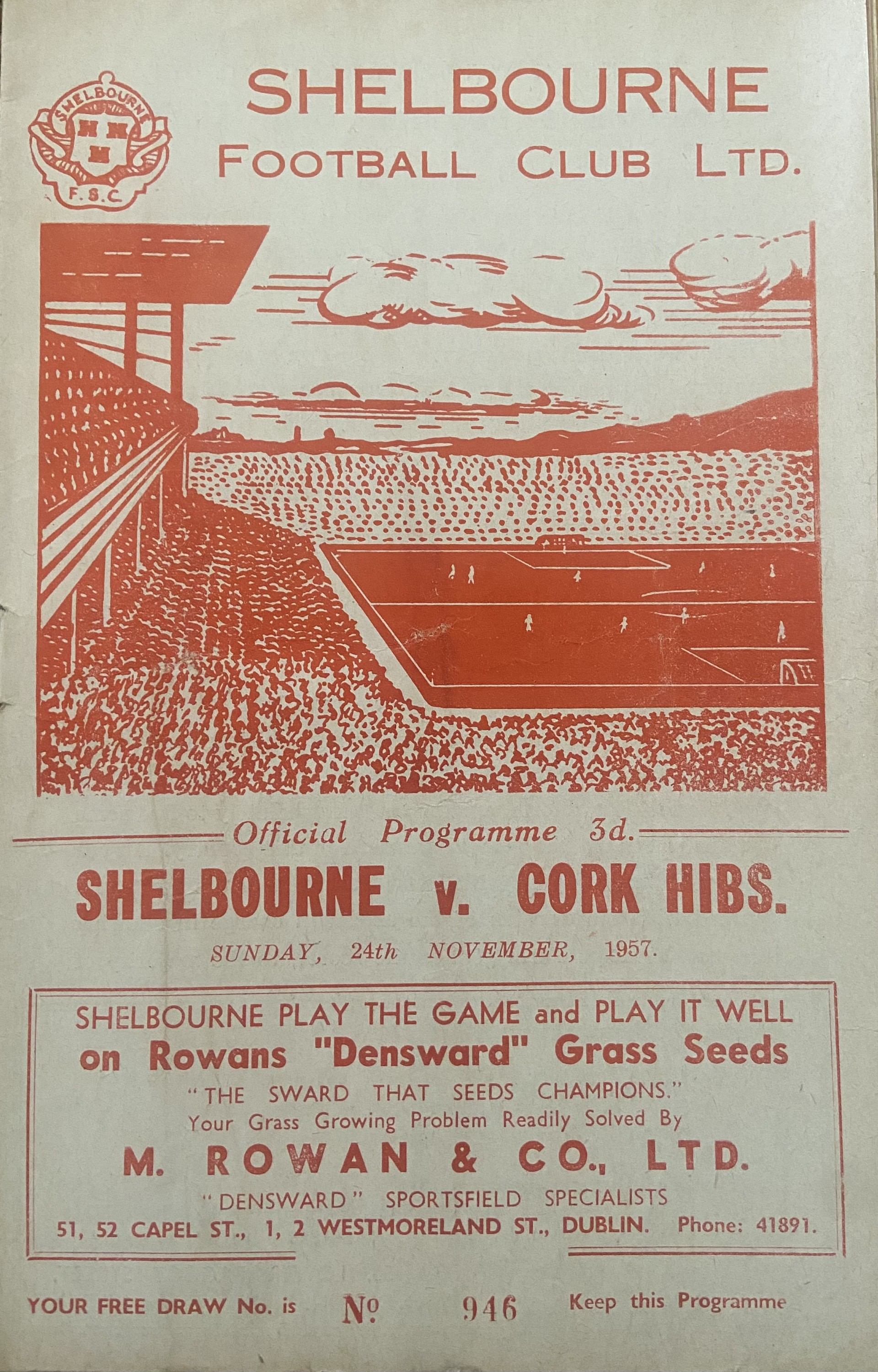
Shelbourne match programme v Cork Hibernians 1957–58 season

During that season Gerry Doyle was appointed manage. The FAI Youth Cup was won in 1959 and Doyle was true to his word, "if they're good enough, they're old enough" and six of the Youth Cup-winning team became first-team regulars. Amongst them was Tony Dunne who would be later transferred to Manchester United with whom he picked up a European Cup winners medal in 1968.

=== Sixties: 1960–1969 ===
Additional reading: Shelbourne F.C. in Europe

Three-goal wins over Bohemians, Shamrock Rovers and Dundalk put Shelbourne in the 1960 FAI Cup Final where they beat Cork Hibernians 2–0 to get their hands on the trophy for only the second time. Cork Celtic were beaten by a Ben Hannigan goal in a play-off for the league in 1962 and they went down to Shamrock Rovers in the final. The FAI Cup was, however, won the following year and it was a repeat of the 1960 final: a 2–0 win over Cork Hibs.

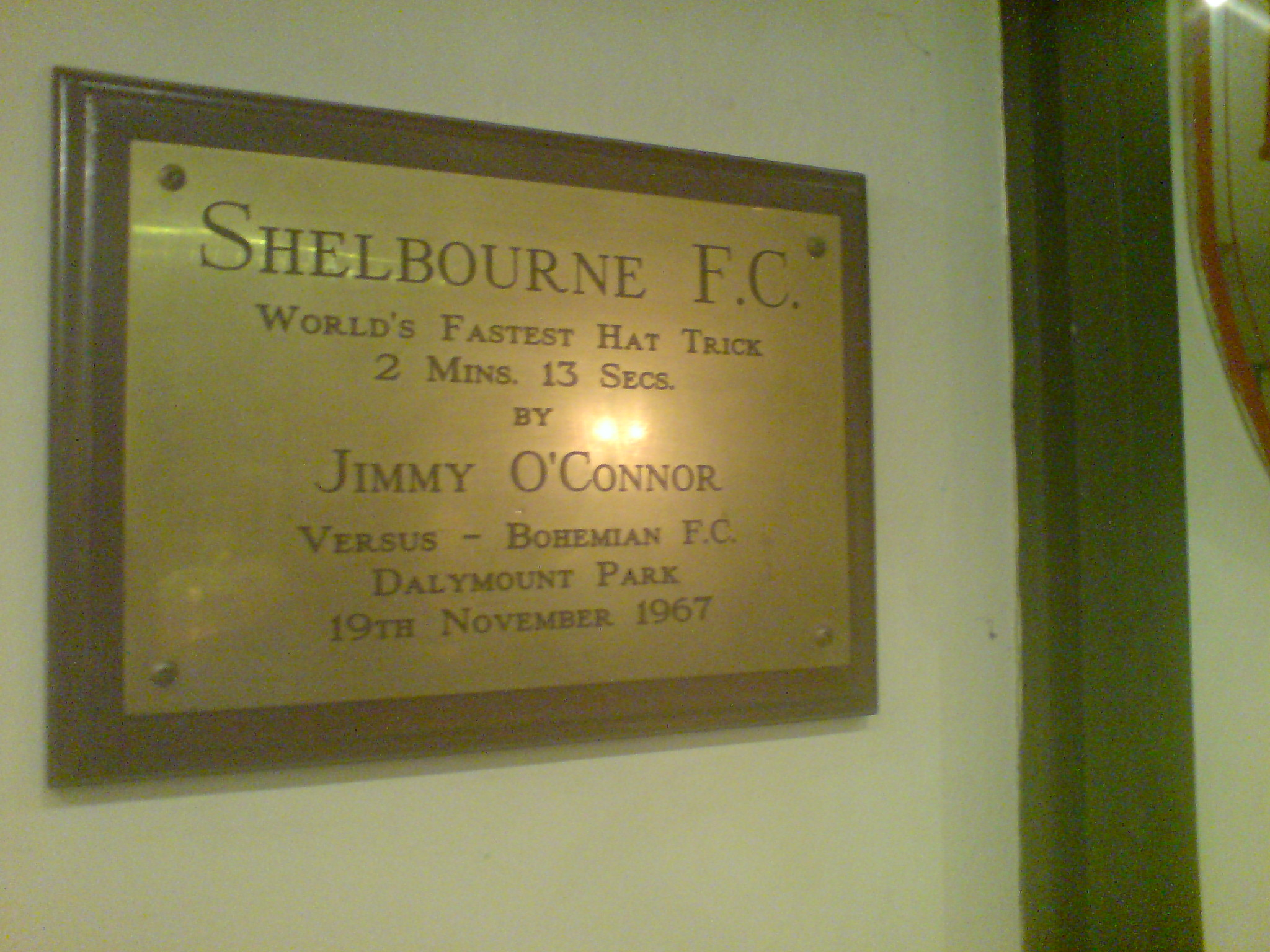
The commemorative plaque in Tolka Park, detailing the quickest hattrick ever, as scored by Jimmy O'Connor on 19 November 1967.

With this success came the excitement of European club football. Shelbourne played their first European match against Sporting Clube de Portugal in 1962: they were beaten 2–0 in the first leg held at Dalymount Park and then 5–1 in Portugal to go out 7–1 on aggregate. The following season they took on Barcelona in the European Cup Winners' Cup but were beaten 5–1 on aggregate. In 1963 Shelbourne won another Leinster Senior Cup. In 1964 the club finally sold their last interest in Irishtown Stadium. Shelbourne won their first European game and tie in the 1964–65 Inter-Cities Fairs Cup, after the first leg resulted in a 0–0 draw and the second leg finished 1–1. They won a playoff match against Portuguese side Belenenses, although the following round they were eliminated 2–0 on aggregate by Atlético Madrid. On 19 November 1967, in a match between Shelbourne and rivals Bohemians, Shelbourne player Jimmy O'Connor set the record for the world's fastest hat-trick in top tier domestic league history, scoring three goals in two minutes and 13 seconds at Dalymount Park. Shelbourne won the Leinster Senior Cup in 1968. In the years that followed, televised highlights of English football began to be broadcast into Ireland and the crowds around most of the league grounds plummeted. Clubs in the league came under huge financial pressure, players left for England at a younger age, grounds became derelict, and media coverage almost disappeared.

=== Decline in the seventies and eighties: 1970–1989 ===
There was a bright enough start to the seventies as Athlone Town were beaten in the Shield final second replay, a win that would see the Reds enter the new UEFA Cup the following season. However, it was to be the last trophy the club would win for some time apart from their Leinster Senior Cup win in 1972. Cork Hibs beat Shels in the replay of the 1973 FAI Cup Final in Flower Lodge — the only time the final was ever played outside Dublin — while Shelbourne were eliminated from the UEFA Cup by Hungarians Vasas SC in what would be their last European game for 21 years. Two years later Shelbourne were shocked in the Cup final by amateurs Home Farm. During this time the club's ongoing problems were covered in a ground-breaking RTÉ fly-on-the-wall documentary entitled In My Book You Should Be Ahead. In 1978, Jimmy Johnstone, a European Cup winner with Celtic in 1967, signed briefly for the club. 'Jinky' only played nine games for the Reds and the European Cup winner failed to score in any of his appearances.

In 1984, Shelbourne lost out to Shamrock Rovers in the FAI Cup semi-final replay. In January 1985, the club travelled to Gran Canaria to take part in the Torneo Internacional de Fútbol de Maspalomas playing against both PSV Eindhoven and Fortuna Düsseldorf.

Shelbourne were relegated on goal difference after finishing level on 13 points with Cork but on −25 goal difference compared to Cork's −21. Shels stay in the First Division was short-lived though, as they came back up straight away with Derry City.

=== Return to success: 1990–1999 ===
Additional reading: Shelbourne F.C. in Europe

Shelbourne captured their eighth league title at the end of the 1991/92 season – the first for 30 years – when they won 3–1 away to outgoing champions Dundalk. That summer, the club went on a three match tour of Australia.

Although the league title was lost the following season after two series of play-offs involving Cork City and Bohemians, the FAI Cup was won, again after a 30-year wait. The club made a return to European competitions after a 21-year wait in 1992 when they faced Ukrainian club SC Tavriya Simferopol in the newly formed UEFA Champions League. They were beaten 2–1 in Ukraine and eliminated from the competition. The following season Shelbourne won their first game in Europe for 30 years when they beat Karpaty Lviv of Ukraine and advanced to play Panathinaikos but were beaten 5–1 on aggregate. Byrne and his assistant Jim McLaughlin were dismissed that October and replaced by former national team manager Eoin Hand. Later that season the Reds won yet another Leinster Senior Cup.

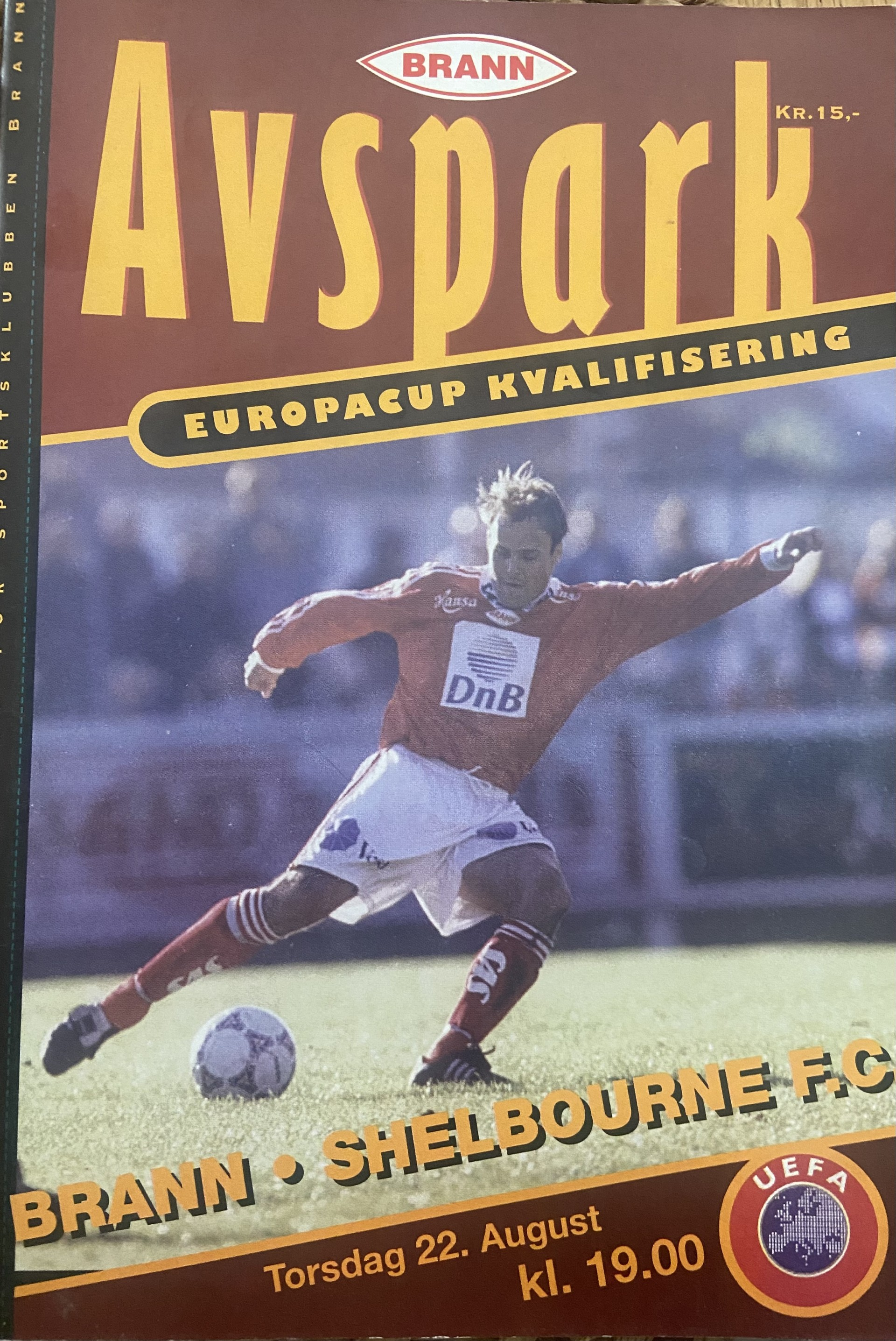
Shelbourne were ever present in European competition from 1995 to 2006

Two seasons later they were beaten 6–0 on aggregate by Icelandic club ÍA Akraness in the UEFA Cup, the previous season they finished third in the league and just two points behind winners Dundalk. Both the League Cup and the FAI Cup were won in 1996 under Damien Richardson. The League Cup was won. In the FAI Cup Final against St. Patrick's, Shels were reduced early on to 10 men as keeper Alan Gough was sent off and, with no sub keeper, midfielder Brian Flood played 70 minutes in goal. Despite trailing 1–0, Tony Sheridan equalised with a lob in the last couple of minutes to force a replay. With Alan Gough back in goal for the rematch, Shels won the trophy . Shelbourne became the third club to retain the FAI Cup when they defeated Derry City 2–0 in the 1997 final, but fell to Brann in the 1996–97 UEFA Cup Winners' Cup Preliminary round.

The scoreboard in Prenton Park, just before the hour mark.

The 1997–98 season brought heartbreak. Shels lost the League Cup Final to Sligo Rovers, the FAI Cup Final to Cork City after a replay and, missed out on the league title on the final day of the season. They were also eliminated from the UEFA Cup Winners' Cup by Kilmarnock. Richardson departed after this disappointment and in stepped Dermot Keely. Keely's first season ended in disappointment: Shelbourne finished third in the league and were knocked out of the FAI Cup at the semifinal stage. In the first qualifying round of the 1998–99 UEFA Cup, Shelbourne were drawn against Glasgow side and one of the Old Firm teams; Rangers. Due to security concerns, Shelbourne's home leg was moved to Prenton Park in Birkenhead. Shelbourne were beaten 5–3 and later beaten 2–0 in the second leg. In the 1999 UEFA Intertoto Cup Shelbourne were beaten in the first round by Swiss club Neuchâtel Xamax.

=== Glory years, European success & financial implosion: 2000–2006 ===
Additional reading: Shelbourne F.C. Seasons
Additional reading: Shelbourne F.C. in Europe

After a mediocre first season, Dermot Keely brought Shels a first-ever League and FAI Cup double in 1999–2000. Having secured the league with a 2–0 win in Waterford , the double was claimed. The following season, though, saw Shels again let the league title slip away on the last day. Shelbourne beat Macedonian club Sloga Jugomagnat to set up a tie with Rosenborg, but were eliminated by the Norwegians 4–2 on aggregate.

The 2001–02 season was dogged by controversy as title challengers St. Patrick's Athletic were docked nine points for fielding an unregistered player in accordance with the league's rules, before having them restored. The league eventually docked them 15 points when it emerged a second unregistered player had played five games. This all led to Shelbourne claiming their 10th league title, in the same season they were eliminated from the UEFA Cup in the preliminary round by Danish club Brøndby.

Shelbourne team before their game away to Steaua Bucharest in the 2005–06 UEFA Champions League qualifying rounds.

Under new manager Pat Fenlon the title was missed out on in 2002–03 and Shelbourne were knocked out in the 2002–03 UEFA Champions League first qualifying round by Maltese side Hibernians. Then for the first time, the club won back-to-back titles in 2003 and 2004 as the league changed to a summer season, although they were eliminated from the 2003–04 UEFA Cup in the competition's opening round by Slovenians Olimpija Ljubljana. Shelbourne entered the 2004–05 UEFA Champions League qualifying rounds in the first round. After beating KR Reykjavík they advanced to face the then-Croatian League Champions Hajduk Split. After the first leg in Croatia, Shelbourne were trailing 3–2, but thanks to a 2–0 victory at home Shelbourne advanced 4–3 on aggregate, becoming the first Irish club to reach the third qualifying round of the UEFA Champions League. However, Shelbourne's Champions League run came to an end when they were beaten by Spanish club, Deportivo La Coruña 3–0 on aggregate, having achieved a 0–0 draw in Lansdowne Road. After the Champions League exit at the hands of Deportivo the club was entered into the UEFA Cup. There, Shels met French side Lille and were beaten 4–2 on aggregate. Shelbourne went on to win the League in 2004.

Having just failed to make the group stages of the Champions League and UEFA Cup in 2004, Shels brought in big-name players for the 2005 season, but only finished third in the league and lost to Linfield in the first-ever Setanta Cup Final . After beating Glentoran home and away in the first qualifying round of the Champions League home and away, they were knocked out 4–1 on aggregate by former European champions Steaua Bucharest.

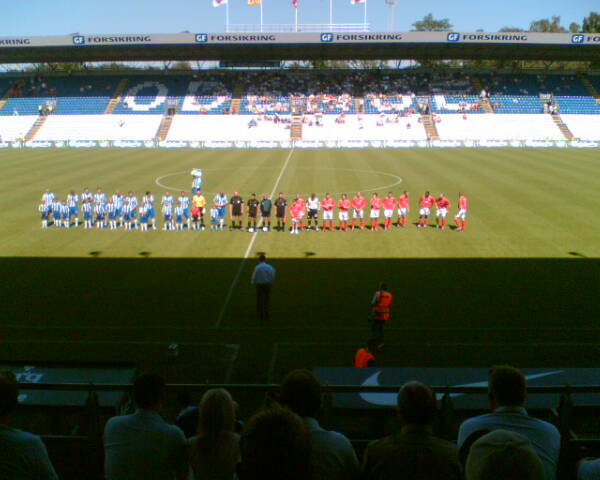
Shelbourne line-out against Odense BK in the second round of the 2006 Intertoto Cup.

2006 saw a change in fortunes for Shelbourne, with The Reds winning the title on the last day of the season on goal difference from the old Derry City, the first time a club had won the title on goal difference following a rule change in 1993. They also managed to reach the Intertoto Cup semi-finals in the Northern Region after beating Lithuanian club Vėtra 5–0 on aggregate, but they were knocked out of the competition by Danish side OB 3–1 on aggregate . In 2006 Shelbourne also reached the League of Ireland Cup final for the first time since 1998 but lost on penalties. That same year, Shelbourne became a member of the 'European Club Forum'.

However, after ongoing financial problems for Shelbourne during the 2006 season, Pat Fenlon resigned as manager and the vast majority of players left, some for rival clubs; others to British clubs.

=== Demotion to the second tier: 2007–2011 ===
Additional reading: Shelbourne F.C. Seasons

Shelbourne withdrew from the 2007 Setanta Sports Cup and before the start of the new league season were demoted to the First Division by the FAI. The club announced on 29 March 2007 that they would not be applying for a UEFA licence to compete in the 2007–08 UEFA Champions League qualifying rounds. The club's majority shareholder Ollie Byrne suffered a brain tumour (he died in August 2007) though Joe Casey had already taken over as chairman. Former manager Dermot Keely was brought back in and assembled a squad in time for the club to take its place in the 2007 League of Ireland First Division. A fifth-place finish was secured.

In the 2008 campaign, with promotion close a last-minute goal by Limerick 37 in Tolka Park gave Dundalk the divisional title and the accompanying solitary promotion spot. In 2008 the club left the disbanded European Club Forum and joined its replacement, the European Club Association, only to leave this organisation the following year. In 2009, the chance for promotion again evaporated when Shels lost 1–2 at home to Sporting Fingal in the promotion/relegation play-off semi-final.

In 2010, former Reds player and former assistant manager Alan Mathews became the new manager. Under Mathews, Shelbourne won the 2010 Leinster Senior Cup and later that year missed out on a place in the promotion play-offs thanks to a 2–1 defeat at home to Waterford United on the final day of the season.

2011 was a year of mixed fortunes for Shelbourne: a change in the promotion rules allowing automatic promotion to both the First Division Champions and Runners-up, which proved to be beneficial for Shelbourne. The Reds clinched promotion back to the Premier Division. 2011 was also a memorable Cup year for Shelbourne, as they were drawn to play Sheriff Y.C. in the fourth round, although Shelbourne were beaten by Sheriff 3–2. However, Sheriff were subsequently found to have fielded an ineligible player, were ejected from the Cup, and as a result Shelbourne were moved in to the quarter-finals. After victories over Limerick in the quarter-final and St Patrick's Athletic in a semi-final replay, after playing with ten men in the first meeting, they secured a place in the 2011 FAI Cup Final, where they were beaten 4–1 on penalties by Sligo Rovers after the game finished 1–1 after extra time. Barry Clancy was "harshly" sent off in the first half for the Reds.

=== Brief return to the top-flight, First Division: 2012–2019 ===
Additional reading: Shelbourne F.C. Seasons

2012 saw Shelbourne finish eighth out of 11 teams on their return to the Premier Division. The club also reached the Cup semi-finals, losing to Derry in a Replay at Tolka Park. However Shelbourne stayed in the top flight for just two seasons, with the Reds finishing bottom of the 2013 Premier Division Alan Mathews was replaced by Johnny McDonnell as manager on 24 May 2013. The 2014 season saw Shelbourne finish second in the First Division, and the club thus advanced to a promotion playoff against Galway FC. Galway FC won the two-legged tie, and Shels remained in the First Division. At the end of the 2014 campaign, McDonnell left to manage Drogheda United and was replaced by Kevin Doherty.

The 2015 season saw the club finish fourth in the league. A disappointing 2016 campaign ended in a sixth-place finish. Former player Owen Heary took over as manager midway through the season following the resignation of Kevin Doherty. In 2017, Heary's first full season as manager ended in a fourth-place league finish. In 2018, the team qualified for a promotion playoff after a third-place finish. Shels lost in the first round to Drogheda over two legs. In 2019, however, Shelbourne would regain promotion to the Premier Division for the first time since 2013 by winning the First Division. They claimed the title with a 3–1 away win over Drogheda at United Park on 14 September 2019. The club saw a 45% increase in home attendances during the 2019 season.

=== Return to the Premier Division, relegation, promotion, League of Ireland title win and qualification to Europe: 2020–2026 ===
In 2020, Shelbourne competed in the Premier Division for the first time since 2013. They were condemned to the First Division once again at the end of the 2020 via a promotion/relegation playoff, but secured a return after winning promotion and the 2021 First Division championship on 1 October 2021. The following month former Irish international Damien Duff was appointed as first team manager. In late 2021, the club, in association with Hope Brewery, launched its own beer.

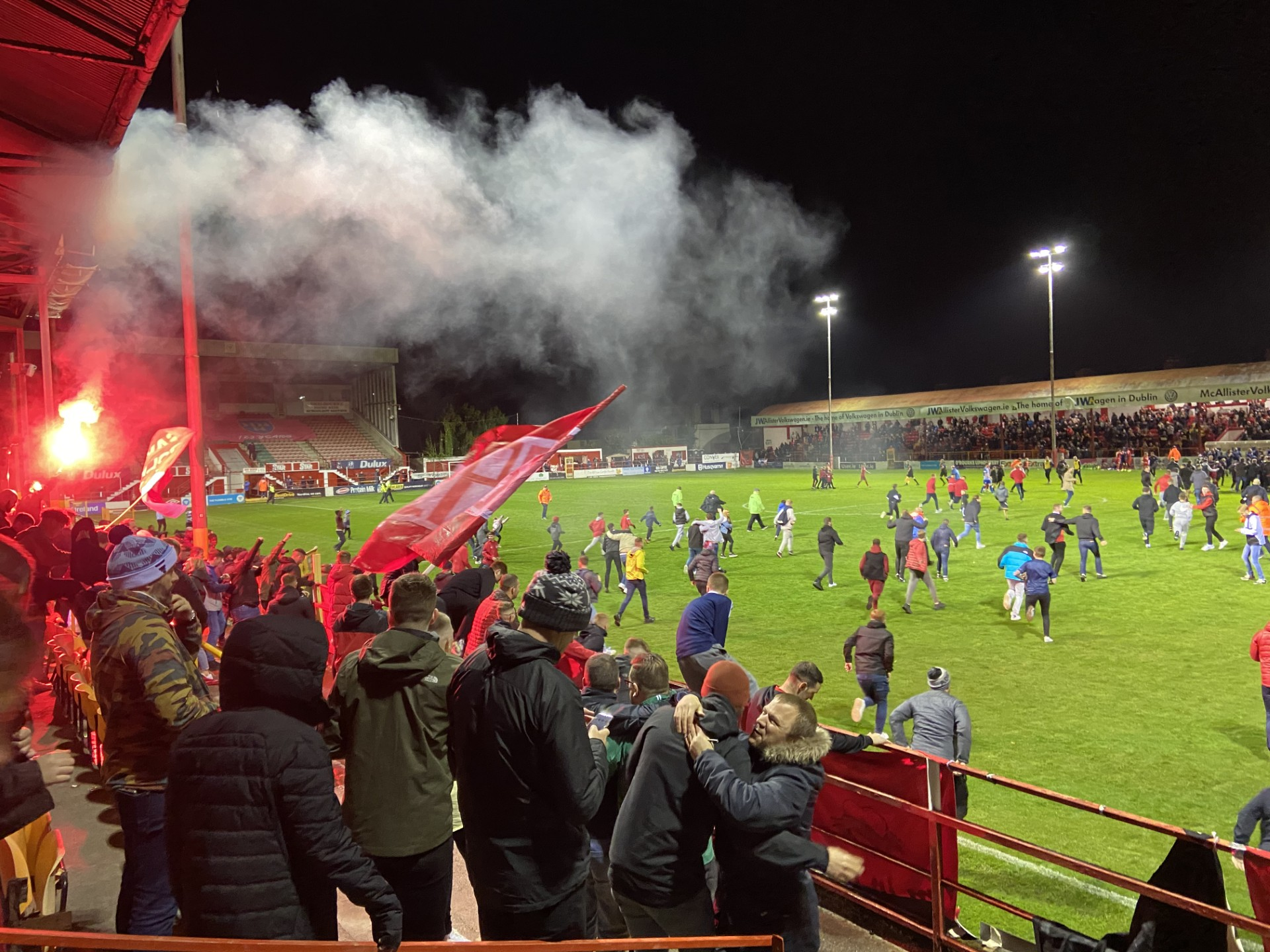
Shelbourne fans celebrate returning to the Premier Division 1 October 2021 at Tolka Park

Having investigated the purchase of Dundalk F.C. in early 2023, Turkish media company Acun Medya, owners of EFL Championship side Hull City, announced the purchase of Shelbourne in June 2023.

In November 2023, the club announced the restructuring of its shareholdings, with the acquisition by long-term supporter and shareholder Mickey O'Rourke, founder of Setanta Sports, through TDL Media, the shareholding of Acun Medya. In the same month, the men's side qualified for UEFA club competition after finishing fourth in the league and Bohemians losing the FAI Cup final.

On 1 November 2024, Shelbourne won the 2024 League of Ireland Premier Division after a 1–0 win against Derry City at the Brandywell as Damien Duff's team rounded off a surprise title winning season with the winning goal coming five minutes from the season's end to win on the final day having started the season at 25/1 for the title. The final day decider attracted the largest ever TV audience for a League of Ireland game.

In February 2025, Shels won the season curtain raiser, the President of Ireland's Cup, for the first time defeating Drogheda United 2-0 in Tolka Park. In May of that year, Shelbourne announced a deal had been struck with the Athletic Union League and the Football Association of Ireland for an 18-year lease of part of the AUL Complex in Clonshaugh.

On 22 June 2025, it was announced that Damien Duff had resigned his position as head coach of the men's senior team with Joey O'Brien succeeding him.

On 28 August 2025 Shelbourne defeated Northern Irish side Linfield 5-1 over two legs in the UEFA Conference League play-off round confirming their spot in the league phase/group stage of a European competition for the first time in the club’s history by reaching the 2025–26 UEFA Conference League league phase. Shels finished the season in third position securing European football again for the 2026-27 season.

On 14 January 2026, Shels broke the League of Ireland record transfer fee by signing defender Odhrán Casey from Cliftonville. The 42 reported that Casey's performances had been identified by Jamestown and that its analysis supported Shelbourne's decision to complete the transfer.

On 13 July 2026, former Sligo Rovers' manager John Russell was announced as head coach of the men's senior team, replacing former Shels player and under 20s manager, Lorcan Fitzgerald, who had filled the role on an interim basis following the departure of Joey O'Brien in mid-June.

== Stadium ==
Additional reading: Tolka Park

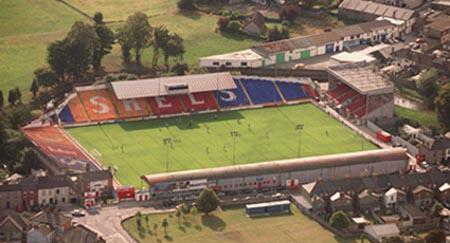
Aerial view of Tolka Park since redevelopment in 1999.

In 1989 Shelbourne acquired the lease on Tolka Park from Dublin Corporation. Before moving to Drumcondra, Shels had most recently been based in Harold's Cross Stadium from 1982 having also spent the 1975–76 season there, while prior to that they had been housed in Shelbourne Park from 1913 to 1949, for one season (1955–56) Irishtown Stadium and occasionally Dalymount Park (1951–54 and 1974–75).

Before Tolka Park was home to Shelbourne it housed Drumcondra F.C. from 1924 until 1972 when Drumcondra unexpectedly went out of business, vacating the ground. Home Farm were the next tenants in Tolka Park, but the club never drew large crowds. When Shelbourne moved into the ground they invested heavily in the stadium, converting it into Ireland's first all-seater stadium and building a new stand behind the Drumcondra end goal in 1999. The first-ever League of Ireland match to be broadcast live on TV was a fixture between Shelbourne and Derry City, staged at Tolka Park during the 1996–97 season.

In 2016, the club announced a future move as co-tenants of Dublin City Council-owned Dalymount Park once redevelopment was completed around 2020. In 2021, the redevelopment was planned to conclude by 2025. The same year however, a coalition of Shels fans, local residents and political activists launched a Save Tolka Park campaign.

In May 2024, the council granted the club a 250-year lease on Tolka Park. This followed proposals in 2022 for the club to repurchase the ground. The lease was officially signed on 4 November 2025. In May 2026 it was announced that Shelbourne FC and the Tolka Park Community Hub had been approved for €9.2M in funding from the state's Immigrant Investor Programme (IIP).

== Supporters and rivalries ==
The club's fanbase is mainly drawn from the northside of Dublin although there are a number of supporters from the Southside, mainly the Ringsend area where the club originates from. The average home league attendance for 2025 was 4562 .

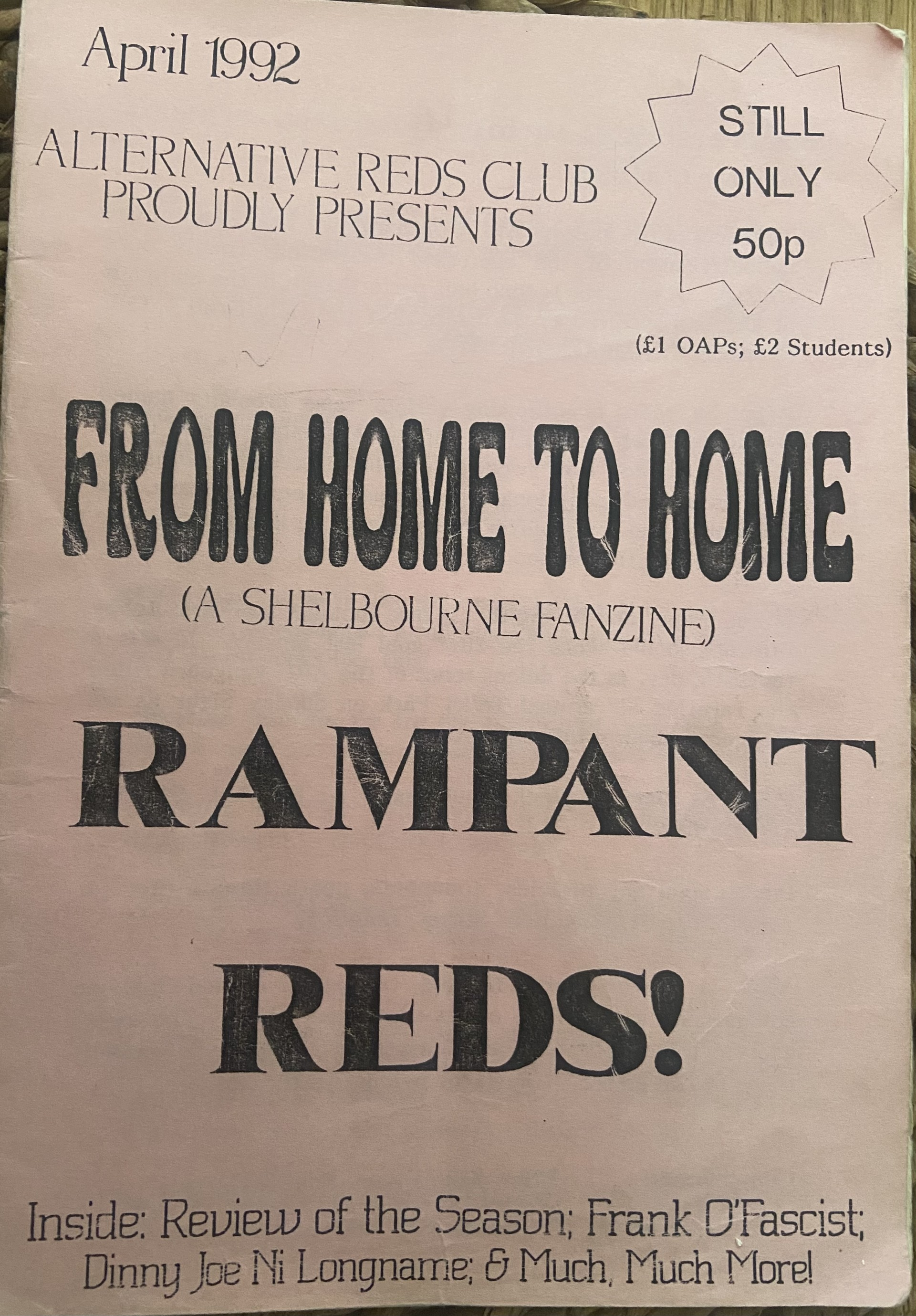
From Home To Home was the first Shels fanzine

'Briogáid Dearg' (Red Brigade) was formed in 2003 and is the club's single Ultras group. 'Reds Independent' are a Shelbourne supporters group formed in 1998 after Shelbourne FC moved their home UEFA Cup tie with Rangers out of the country and to Prenton Park, the home of Tranmere Rovers FC. The group gives Shelbourne fans an independent voice, through Red Inc., one of the longest-running fanzines in the world. Red Inc. was first sold as a sixteen-page publication priced fifty pence for a home league tie against Cork City on 31 January 1999.

The 'Shelbourne Supporters' Development Group' was founded in 2006 with the aim of securing badly needed funding from the Shelbourne supporter base. The Group had been promised shares in Shelbourne FC Ltd and representation on the board if it raises a certain amount of money for Shelbourne FC each year.

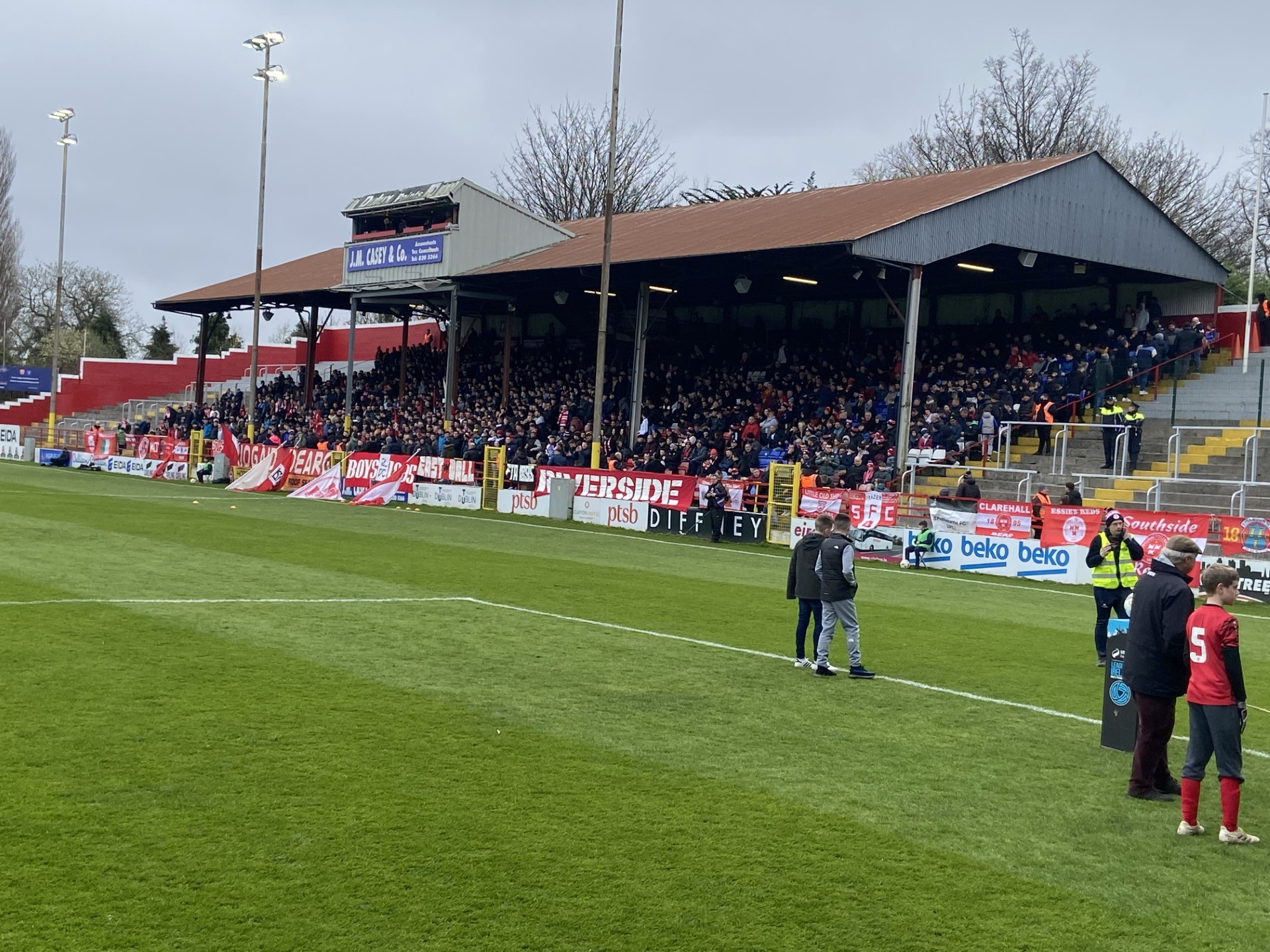
Shelbourne fans before a League of Ireland Premier Division match v Derry City Tolka Park 1 April 2024

In October 2012 a Shelbourne FC Supporters' Trust was agreed to be launched by fans. The Trust's name was officially voted as "The 1895 Trust" in celebration of the founding year of the club. The Trust was officially launched in 2013.

In 2016, some Reds voiced their opposition to the board's proposal to have Tolka Park redeveloped for housing and the men's senior team to become tenants in Dalymount Park. The final home match of the season against Waterford United was halted due to the protests. Reds Independent fans group called for a boycott following the club's failure to engage with fans on issues surrounding the proposed move.

Shelbourne shares a rivalry with Bohemians largely because of geographical proximity as both clubs are now located roughly just one mile apart, and also because of their early days in the old Belfast-centered Irish League and the early Irish Free State league. The club also has rivalries with other Dublin sides St Patrick's Athletic (filling stadiums on derby day) and Shamrock Rovers (the Ringsend derby).

== European football ==
Shelbourne first performed on the European stage in the 1962–63 season, taking on Sporting Lisbon in the European Cup.

Following the club's post-2006 decline, they had been unranked in the UEFA Team Rankings, but have re-emerged in the 2024-25 rankings with 377 club coefficient points. The club returned to the UEFA Champions League qualifiers in 2025. In August 2025 Shelbourne defeated Linfield 5:1 on aggregate to progress to the league phase of the UEFA Conference League.

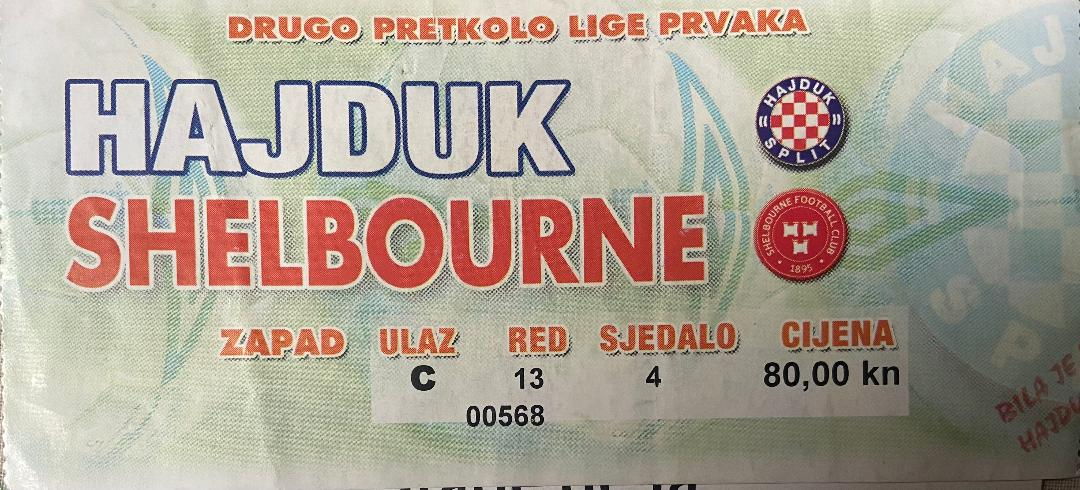
Away Match Ticket Hajduk Split v Shelbourne Champions League qualifying tie 28 July 2004

=== Overview ===
Competition	P	W	D	L	GF	GA	Last season played
European Cup / UEFA Champions League	24	5	9	10	23	36	2025–26
Inter-Cities Fairs Cup	5	1	2	2	3	4	1964–65
UEFA Cup/UEFA Europa League	14	1	2	11	11	32	2025–26
European Cup Winners' Cup / UEFA Cup Winners' Cup	10	1	1	8	9	20	1997–98
UEFA Intertoto Cup	6	3	1	2	6	5	2006
UEFA Conference League	16	4	5	7	17	22	2026-27
TOTAL	75	15	20	40	69	119	

== Players ==
As of 1 November 2026

Note: Flags indicate national team as defined under FIFA eligibility rules; some limited exceptions apply. Players may hold more than one non-FIFA nationality.

No.	Pos.	Nation	Player
2	DF	IRL	Sean Gannon
4	DF	IRL	Kameron Ledwidge
6	MF	IRL	Jonathan Lunney
9	FW	IRL	Seán Boyd
10	FW	IRL	John Martin
11	FW	IRL	Mipo Odubeko
13	GK	SCO	Murray Johnson (on loan from Hibernian)
14	MF	SCO	Ali Coote
15	DF	ENG	Sam Bone
16	DF	NIR	Odhrán Casey
17	MF	IRL	Daniel Kelly
18	DF	ENG	James Norris
19	GK	WAL	Eddie Beach
20	FW	POR	Rodrigo Freitas
21	MF	IRL	Jack Henry-Francis
22	MF	IRL	Sean Moore

No.	Pos.	Nation	Player
23	MF	SCO	Kerr McInroy (captain)
24	DF	AUT	Marco Untergrabner
25	DF	FRA	Milan Mbeng
27	MF	IRL	Evan Caffrey
29	DF	IRL	Paddy Barrett
31	GK	IRL	Conor Walsh
33	DF	IRL	Derinsola Adewale
36	FW	ENG	Will Jarvis
44	FW	IRL	Daniel Ring
45	DF	IRL	Taylor McCarthy
50	GK	IRL	Ali Topcu
55	DF	IRL	James Roche
56	FW	IRL	Joey Wuna
73	GK	IRL	Finn Moylan
—	GK	IRL	Conor Kearns
—	MF	IRL	James Bailey

=== Out on loan ===
Note: Flags indicate national team as defined under FIFA eligibility rules; some limited exceptions apply. Players may hold more than one non-FIFA nationality.

No.	Pos.	Nation	Player
28	MF	ERI	Maill Lundgren (on loan at Ranheim until January 2027)

== Technical staff ==
Position	Staff
Head coach	Lorcan Fitzgerald (interim)
Assistant coach	David McAllister
Goalkeeping coach	Paul Skinner
Strength & Conditioning Coach	Mauro Martins
Physio	Mark Cornish
Doctor	Anthony Hoban
Kit man	Johnny & Graham Watson
Technical Director	Luke Byrne
Academy Director	Colm Barron
Club Owners	TDL Media Ltd, Brian McGovern, Richard Walsh, Larry Bass, SMT Trust, Closebreak Ltd, TFNI Ltd
CEO	Tomás Quinn

== Notable former players ==
- (Lithuania) (Republic of Ireland) Louis Bookman (1916–1919, 1924–1925)
- (Republic of Ireland) Tony Dunne (1958–1960)
- (Spain) Alvarito (1964–1965)
- (Republic of Ireland) Wes Hoolahan (2001–2005)
- (Cameroon) Joseph N'Do (2004–2006)
- (Trinidad and Tobago) Avery John (2000–2001)
- (Republic of Ireland) Nicky Byrne (1997–1998)
- (Republic of Ireland) Paddy Roche (1970–1973)
- (Republic of Ireland) Alan Moore (2004–2007)
- (Republic of Ireland) Stephen Elliott (2016)
- (Republic of Ireland) Tony Sheridan (1995–1999, 2000–2001, 2002–2003)
- (Zimbabwe) Henry McKop (1995–1996)
- (Republic of Ireland) Val Harris (1903–1908, 1914–1927)
- (Scotland) Jimmy Johnstone (1977–1978)
- (Republic of Ireland) Joe Haverty (1965–1966)
- (Republic of Ireland) Curtis Fleming (2005)
- (Republic of Ireland) Jason Byrne (2003–2006)
- (Australia) Brad Jones (2001)
- (Republic of Ireland) Eric Barber (1958–1966, 1971–1975, 1979–1980)
- (Republic of Ireland) Anthony Stokes (2002–2003)
- (Republic of Ireland) Stephen Geoghegan (1994–2003)
- (Republic of Ireland) Freddie Strahan (1957–1969)
- (Republic of Ireland) Ben Hannigan (1958–1966, 1971–1975, 1979–1980)
- (Republic of Ireland) Eoin Hand (1966)
- (Republic of Ireland) Pat Byrne (1978–1979, 1988–1993)
- (Republic of Ireland) Tommy Carroll (1957–1963, 1975–1976)
- (England) Alf Hanson (1946–1947)
- (Republic of Ireland) Gary Howlett (1991–1995)
- (Republic of Ireland) Liam Buckley (1978–1979)
- (Republic of Ireland) Martin Colfer (1948–1956)
- (Scotland) Patrick Connolly (1930–1931)
- (Republic of Ireland) Dermot Curtis (1952–1956)
- (Republic of Ireland) Jackie Hennessy (1958–1966)
- (England) Scott Oakes (2003)
- (England) Norman Tapken (1948–1949)
- (England) Oscar Linkson (1913–1914)
- (Republic of Ireland) Gavin Molloy (2021–2024)
- (Republic of Ireland) Jim Crawford (2000–2007)
- (Republic of Ireland) Owen Heary (1998–2006)
- (Trinidad and Tobago) Daniel Carr (2022)
- (Portugal) Euclides Cabral (2023)
- (Republic of Ireland) Theo Dunne (1959–1965)
- (Wales) Scott van-der-Sluis (2022–2023)
- (Republic of Ireland) Jack Moylan (2022–2023)
- (England) Mark Rutherford (1991–1998, 2008)
- (England) Dave Rogers (2003–2006)
- (Republic of Ireland) Aiden O'Brien (2024)
- (Moldova) Stephan Negru (2022)
- (Scotland) Dixie Deans (1977)
- (Republic of Ireland) Mark Coyle (2022–2026)
- (Republic of Ireland) Jim Gannon (2001–2003)
- (Republic of Ireland) Stuart Byrne (2002–2006)
- (England) Gary Haylock (1990–1993, 1999–2022)
- (Wales) Steve Williams (1999–2006, 2010)
- (Scotland) Peter Shevlin (1931–1933)
- (Republic of Ireland) Pat Dunne (1980–1981)
- (Republic of Ireland) Arthur Fitzsimons (1946–1949)
- (Republic of Ireland) Peter Desmond (1948–1949)
- (England) Harry Wood (2023, 2024–2026)
- (Netherlands) wessel Speel (2025–2026)
- (New Zealand) Willem de Graaf (1973)
- (Republic of Ireland) Graham Carey (2005)
- (Republic of Ireland) Ollie Cahill (2002–2006)
- (Republic of Ireland) Richie Baker (1998-2003) (2005-2006) (2009)
- (Republic of Ireland) Paddy Roberts (1960-1969)
- (Republic of Ireland) Sean Gannon (footballer) (2024-2026)
- (Republic of Ireland) Dessie Baker (1996-2004)
- (Republic of Ireland) Paddy Turner (1960-1961)

== Former managers ==
- (Scotland) Peter Shevlin (1931–33)
- (Republic of Ireland) Val Harris (193?–??)
- (Republic of Ireland) John Feenan (1942–46)
- (Republic of Ireland) Alf Hanson (1946–47)
- (Republic of Ireland) Bob Thomas (1950–53)
- (England) David Jack (1953–55)
- (Republic of Ireland) Eddie Gannon (1955–57)
- (Republic of Ireland) Gerry Doyle (1957–65)
- (Republic of Ireland) Con Martin (1965)
- (Spain) Alvarito (1965)
- (Republic of Ireland) Gerry Doyle (1967–75)
- (Republic of Ireland) Tommy Carroll (1975–76)
- (Republic of Ireland) Mick Dalton (1978–79)
- (Republic of Ireland) Eric Barber (1979–80)
- (Republic of Ireland) Pat Dunne (1980–81)
- (Republic of Ireland) Freddie Strahan (1981)
- (Republic of Ireland) Frank O'Neill (1981)
- (Republic of Ireland) Liam Tuohy (1981–82)
- (Northern Ireland) Jim McLaughlin (1983–86)
- (Republic of Ireland) Paddy Mulligan (1985–86)
- (Republic of Ireland) Pat Byrne (1988–93)
- (Republic of Ireland) Eoin Hand (1993–94)
- (Republic of Ireland) Eamonn Gregg (1994)
- (Republic of Ireland) Colin Murphy (1994–95)
- (Republic of Ireland) Damien Richardson (1995–98)
- (Republic of Ireland) Dermot Keely (1998–02)
- (Republic of Ireland) Pat Fenlon (2002–06)
- (Republic of Ireland) Dermot Keely (1 March 2007 – 27 May 2010)
- (Republic of Ireland) Colin O´Neill (interim) (28 May 2010 – 9 July 2010)
- (Republic of Ireland) Alan Mathews (12 July 2010 – 16 May 2013)
- (Republic of Ireland) Kevin Doherty (interim) (17 May 2013 – 23 May 2013)
- (Republic of Ireland) John McDonnell (24 May 2013 – 2014)
- (Republic of Ireland) Kevin Doherty (Dec 2014 – June 2016)
- (Republic of Ireland) Owen Heary (June 2016 – October 2018)
- (Republic of Ireland) Ian Morris (November 2018 – October 2021)
- (Republic of Ireland) Damien Duff (November 2021 – June 2025)
- (Republic of Ireland) Joey O'Brien (June 2025 – June 2026)
- (Republic of Ireland) Lorcan Fitzgerald (interim) (June 2026 – July 2026)
- (Republic of Ireland) John Russell (July 2026 – )

== Other teams ==
=== Women's team ===
The first Shels women's side played during the 1990s, being beaten FAI Women's Cup finalists in 1997 and 1999.

In 2015 Shelbourne Ladies took over Raheny United's senior women's team. This effectively saw Shelbourne Ladies replace Raheny United in the Women's National League. During the subsequent 2015–16 season, Shelbourne Ladies finished as runners-up in the FAI Women's Cup, the WNL Shield and the Women's National League. All three competitions were won by Wexford Youths. However Shelbourne Ladies did win the WNL Cup after defeating UCD Waves 3–2 in the final at Richmond Park on 1 May 2016. In 2016 Shelbourne won the double with the FAI Women's Cup success coming with the hammering of Wexford Youths 5–0 in the final at the Aviva Stadium. The most notable individual performance to come out of the game was undoubtedly that of Shels' Leanne Kiernan, who scored a hat-trick and picked up the 'player of the match' award for her efforts.

The team won their first league championship when they finished the shortened 2016 season in first place. They qualified for the 2017–18 UEFA Women's Champions League with that title. In March 2019 Shelbourne announced a number of steps intended to boost "equality and parity of esteem for all of our players." They dropped the word Ladies from the women's team's name and moved WNL home games from the AUL Complex to the main stadium at Tolka Park. The WNL team won the WNL and FAI Women's Cup in 2022, and the cup again in 2024. In 2026, the side claimed their first ever All-Island Cup defeating Galway United 2:0 in the final at Tolka Park, and later that year they claimed another FAI Cup by defeating Athlone Town 3:1 at Tallaght Stadium.

=== U-19/20 team ===
Shelbourne's underage teams had success down the years winning the FAI Minor Cup (now the FAI Youth Cup) on three occasions, and the Enda McGuill Cup twice as well as providing the senior team with numerous future stars such as Finbarr Flood, Tony Dunne and Richie Baker.

It was announced on 21 April 2011, by the Football Association of Ireland that there would be the formation of a League of Ireland U19 Division, thus giving young players in Ireland the prospect of ultimately breaking into the first teams of League of Ireland clubs. Since then, the age group has changed to under 20.

The U19 side made their debut in the UEFA Youth League in the 2025/26 edition beating North Macedonia side Rabotnicki 5:0 in Tolka Park in the first leg. A 7:1 win for the Young Reds in the return leg at the FFM Training Centre saw the side through 12:1 on aggregate. In the Domestic Champions path second round first leg, Shels drew 2:2 away to Žilina after being two goals down. Shels lost 0:2 on penalties following a 0:0 draw after 90 minutes.

=== Schoolboys ===
The earliest record of a schoolboy team at the club goes back to 1904.

Shelbourne are also involved in a football scholarship programme with Larkin Community College, on Dublin's northside. This scheme is considered to have helped stop the falling enrolment rates, and early leaving of school, in part of Dublin's north inner city.

=== Amateur team ===
Shelbourne also has an amateur team playing in the United Churches Football League, Division 1. However, the team started in the Amateur Football League Division 2. They won promotion to Division 1 in 2008 and earned a place in the Premier Division a year later . In 2013 they won the Premier Division. In 2014 the team had silverware again. This time it was the Maher Cup. 2015 saw the team move away from the Amateur Football League to the United Churches Football League, where it remains to date.

=== Reserve team ===
The Shelbourne A team took part in the 2010 A Championship and finished sixth in Group 1. The team did not participate in the 2011 edition of the Championship, which was the last edition of the competition.

== Honours ==
- League of Ireland/Premier Division 14:
  - 1925–26, 1928–29, 1930–31, 1943–44, 1946–47, 1952–53, 1961–62, 1991–92, 1999–2000, 2001–02, 2003, 2004, 2006, 2024
- League of Ireland First Division 2:
  - 2019, 2021
- Irish Cup: 3
  - 1905–06, 1910–11, 1919–20
- FAI Cup: 7
  - 1938–39, 1959–60, 1962–63, 1992–93, 1995–96, 1996–97, 1999–2000
- League of Ireland Cup: 1
  - 1995–96
- League of Ireland Shield: 8
  - 1921–22, 1922–23, 1925–26, 1929–30, 1943–44, 1944–45, 1948–49, 1970–71
- LFA President's Cup: 8
  - 1929–30 [shared], 1939–40, 1947–48 [shared], 1960–61, 1993–94, 1995–96, 1998–99, 2002–03
- FAI Super Cup: 1
  - 2001–02
- President of Ireland's Cup: 1
  - 2025
- Dublin City Cup: 4
  - 1941–42, 1946–47, 1962–63, 1964–65
- City Cup: 1
  - 1908–09
- Gold Cup: 1
  - 1914–15
- Top Four Cup: 1
  - 1961–62
- Leinster Senior League: 12 (record)
  - 1902–03, 1903–04, 1906–07, 1907–08, 1908–09, 1910–11, 1915–16, 1916–17, 1918–19, 1923–24, 1942–43, 1943–44
- Leinster Senior Cup: 21
  - 1899–1900, 1900–01, 1903–04, 1905–06, 1907–08, 1908–09, 1912–13, 1913–14, 1916–17, 1918–19 1923–24, 1930–31, 1945–46, 1948–49, 1962–63, 1967–68, 1971–72, 1993–94, 2010, 2017, 2018
- Leinster Senior League Metropolitan Cup: 1
  - 1904/05
- FAI Intermediate Cup: 1
  - 1933
- Leinster Junior League: 1
  - 1896–97
- Leinster Junior Cup: 1
  - 1896–97
- Enda McGuill Cup: 2
  - 2003, 2025
- FAI Youth Cup: 3
  - 1959, 1961, 1969

== Records ==
=== Results ===
- Biggest League Win:
  - 9–0 vs Pioneers, 16 December 1922
  - 9–0 vs Bray Unknowns, 4 September 1926
- Biggest League Defeat:
  - 0–9 vs Dundalk, 27 November 1980
- Biggest FAI Cup Win:
  - 9–0 vs Bray Unknowns, 6 January 1923
- Biggest European Win:
  - single tie: 4–0 vs Vėtra home, 24 June 2006
  - aggregate: 5–0 vs Vėtra, June 2006

=== Goals / scorers ===
- Most League goals in a season:
  - 72 (1922–23)
- Most League goals in a game:
  - 6, John Ledwidge vs Jacobs, 9–1 home, 10 October 1929
  - 6, Alex Hair vs Jacobs, 7–0 home, 6 September 1930
- Most FAI Cup goals in a game:
  - 5, Stephen Doyle vs Bray Unknowns 9–0 home, 6 January 1923
- Top League scorer:
  - season: 29, Alex Hair, (1930–31)
  - total: 126, Eric Barber, (1958–66), (1971–75), (1978–80)
- Top European scorer:
  - season: 5, Jason Byrne, (2004–05)
  - total: 8, Jason Byrne, (2003–06)

=== International caps ===
Full international caps won by players while with Shelbourne:

- Ireland (IFA): 5 players capped
  - First: Val Harris vs England home, 17 February 1906.
  - Last: Ed Brookes vs Scotland away, 13 March 1920.
  - Most: Val Harris (6), (1906–08).
- Irish Free State/Republic of Ireland (FAI): 23 players capped
  - First: Mick Foley and Fran Watters vs Italy away, 21 March 1926.
  - Last: Jason Byrne vs Chile home, 24 May 2006.
  - Most: Joe Haverty (7), (1965–66).

== In popular culture ==
- The club appeared in the fictional football drama Dream Team on Sky TV when Harchester United were drawn to play "The Reds" in the UEFA Cup.
