= Freddie Strahan =

Irish footballer (1938–2024)

Personal information
- Date of birth: 21 December 1938
- Place of birth: Dublin, Ireland
- Date of death: 13 December 2024 (aged 85)
- Position: Midfielder

Senior career*
Years	Team	Apps	(Gls)
1957–1969	Shelbourne		
1969–1972	St Patrick's Athletic		

International career
1964–1966	Republic of Ireland	5	(1)

Managerial career
- 1981: Shelbourne
- * Club domestic league appearances and goals

Freddie Strahan (21 December 1938 – 13 December 2024) was an Irish professional footballer who played as a midfielder. He is the only League of Ireland player to score for the Republic of Ireland against England during their 14 meetings since 1946.

== Career ==
Strahan played hurling with Kevin's Hurling Club until the age of sixteen and won a Dublin Minor Hurling Championship before he signed for Shelbourne in 1957 with whom he went on to win a League of Ireland title and two FAI Cups.

He won five caps for the Republic of Ireland national team at international level. He represented the League of Ireland XI against Italy in May 1962. His international debut was against Poland in a 3–1 defeat on 10 May 1964 in Kraków, and he scored against England two weeks later.

Strahan was awarded a benefit game in June 1966. He later served the club as secretary, director and briefly as manager in 1981.

== Personal life and death ==
Strahan lived in Dublin, and received the title 'FAI Eircom Legend' at the Ireland v Poland match in November 2008, as a sign of honour.

Strahan died on 13 December 2024, at the age of 85.

== Honours ==
Shelbourne

- League of Ireland: 1961–62
- FAI Cup: 1960, 1963

Kevins Hurling Club

- Dublin Minor Hurling Championship: 1956
