= Alvarito =

Spanish footballer and manager

Personal information
- Full name: Álvaro Rodríguez Ros
- Date of birth: 16 January 1936
- Place of birth: Ujo, Spain
- Date of death: 16 June 2018 (aged 82)
- Place of death: Huércal-Overa, Spain
- Height: 1.80 m (5 ft 11 in)
- Position: Defender

Youth career
- San Juan de Mieres

Senior career*
Years	Team	Apps	(Gls)
1953–1954	Langreano		
1954–1955	Caudal	14	(0)
1955–1957	Oviedo	45	(0)
1957–1963	Atlético Madrid	39	(0)
1963–1964	Murcia	20	(1)
1964–1965	Shelbourne	6	(0)
1965	Córdoba	0	(0)
1968	Vancouver Royals	0	(0)
1969–1970	Santa Barbara		

International career
1959	Spain B	1	(0)
1960	Spain	2	(0)

Managerial career
- 1965: Shelbourne
- 1979–1980: Benimar
- 1980–1982: Benicarló
- 1983: Algemesí
- 1983–1984: Alaquàs
- 1984–1985: Benicarló
- 1985: Requena
- 1987–1988: Marbella
- 1989–1990: Melilla
- 1990–1991: Linense
- 1991–1992: Melilla
- * Club domestic league appearances and goals

Álvaro Rodríguez Ros (16 January 1936 – 16 June 2018), commonly known as Alvarito, was a Spanish football defender and manager.

== Club career ==
Alvarito was born in Ujo, Mieres. After playing for two clubs in his native Asturias, he joined the professionals in 1955, going on to spend two seasons in Segunda División with Real Oviedo also in his region of birth. In summer 1957, he joined La Liga side Atlético Madrid alongside teammate Toni Cuervo, also a fullback.

Cuervo returned to Oviedo shortly after a health problem halted his progression, but Alvarito stayed with Atlético, helping them to back-to-back Copa del Rey conquests, both won at the Santiago Bernabéu Stadium against Real Madrid. He never appeared in more than nine league games for the club during his six-year spell as no substitutions were allowed at that time, and often played understudy to Isacio Calleja; he also suffered a tibia and fibula injury, in a match against Real Valladolid.

Alvarito's last season in his country's top division would be 1963–64, playing the most he had in years to help Real Murcia finish in 12th position and scoring his first and only goal in the competition on 16 February 1964, in a 1–0 home win over former team Oviedo. Subsequently, he plied his trade in the Republic of Ireland, Canada and the United States – very briefly returning to Spain to appear for Córdoba CF – acting as player-coach for Shelbourne. He retired in 1970, at the age of 34.

Subsequently, Alvarito worked as a manager, never in higher than Segunda División B.

== International career ==
Alvarito earned two caps for Spain in July 1960, in as many away friendlies: on the 14th, he made his debut in a 4–0 win against Chile. Ten days later, he appeared in a 0–2 loss with Argentina.

== Death ==
Alvarito died on 16 June 2018 in Huércal-Overa, Province of Almería, at the age of 82.

== Honours ==
Atlético Madrid

- Copa del Generalísimo: 1959–60, 1960–61
