= De Freitas do Amaral =

De Freitas do Amaral may refer to:

- Diogo de Freitas do Amaral (1941–2019), a Portuguese politician and law professor
- Duarte de Freitas do Amaral (1909–1979), a Portuguese politician
- João de Freitas do Amaral (1948–1995), a Portuguese politician and journalist

== See also ==
- De Freitas (disambiguation)
- Do Amaral (disambiguation)
