= Rodrigo Freitas (footballer, born 2002) =

Portuguese footballer (born 2002)

Personal information
- Full name: Rodrigo Costa Freitas
- Date of birth: 28 April 2002 (age 24)
- Place of birth: Almada, Portugal
- Height: 1.80 m (5 ft 11 in)
- Position: Striker

Team information
- Current team: Shelbourne
- Number: 20

Youth career
- –2019: Cova da Piedade
- 2019–2020: Amora
- 2020–2023: Alverca
- 2021–2022: → Estoril (loan)

Senior career*
Years	Team	Apps	(Gls)
2023–2024	Alverca	4	(0)
2024–2026	Varzim	35	(6)
2026–	Shelbourne	24	(0)
- * Club domestic league appearances and goals as of 19:49, 10 November 2026 (UTC)

Rodrigo Costa Freitas (born 28 April 2002) is a Portuguese professional footballer who plays as a striker for League of Ireland Premier Division club Shelbourne. He previously played for Alverca and Varzim.

== Career ==
=== Early career ===
Freitas was born in Almada, Portugal and played his academy football with Cova da Piedade, Amora and Alverca, where he also spent a season on loan with the academy of Estoril.

=== Alverca ===
Having come through the Alverca academy, Freitas made his senior debut for the club on 11 March 2023 in a 2–1 victory over Belenenses. He left the club in the summer of 2024 after making 4 senior appearances.

=== Varzim ===
Freitas signed for Liga 3 side Varzim ahead of the 2024–25 season and scored the first goal of his career on 15 September 2024 in a 3–1 win away to Vilaverdense. He scored 6 goals in 14 appearances in the first half of the 2025–26 season with drew interest from abroad, resulting in him leaving the club.

=== Shelbourne ===
On 19 January 2026, Freitas joined League of Ireland Premier Division club Shelbourne on a long-term contract for an undisclosed fee believed to be in the region of €30,000–€50,000. On 23 July 2026, he scored his first goal for the club, opening the scoring in a 5–2 victory over Nõmme Kalju in the UEFA Conference League, ending a 21 game goal drought since joining Shelbourne. On 13 August 2026, he scored in the following round in a 2–2 draw with Ajax when Evan Caffrey's shot deflected off his back and into the top corner.

== Career statistics ==
As of match played on 14 September 2026

Appearances and goals by club, season and competition
Club	Season	League			National cup (Note: Includes Taça de Portugal & FAI Cup)		Europe		Other		Total	
Club	Season	Division	Apps	Goals	Apps	Goals	Apps	Goals	Apps	Goals	Apps	Goals
Alverca	2022–23	Liga 3	1	0	0	0	–		–		1	0
Alverca	2023–24	Liga 3	3	0	0	0	–		–		3	0
Alverca	Total		4	0	0	0	0	0	0	0	4	0
Varzim	2024–25	Liga 3	22	1	3	2	–		–		25	3
Varzim	2025–26	Liga 3	13	5	1	1	–		–		14	6
Varzim	Total		35	6	4	3	0	0	0	0	39	9
Shelbourne	2026	LOI Premier Division	24	0	1	0	4 (Note: Appearance(s) in the UEFA Conference League)	2	0 (Note: Appearance(s) in the Leinster Senior Cup)	0	29	2
Career Total			63	6	5	3	4	2	0	0	72	11
