= Christophe Freitas =

French footballer (born 1981)

Personal information
- Full name: Christophe Ferreira de Freitas
- Date of birth: 9 May 1981 (age 45)
- Place of birth: Ermont, France
- Height: 1.82 m (5 ft 11 1/2 in)
- Position: Midfielder

Team information
- Current team: FC Martigues

Senior career*
Years	Team	Apps	(Gls)
2002–2005	Le Mans	10	(0)
2003–2004	→ L'Entente SSG (loan)		
2005–2007	SO Châtellerault		
2007–2009	L'Entente SSG		
2009–	FC Martigues		
- * Club domestic league appearances and goals as of 13:43, 27 November 2009 (UTC)

Christophe Ferreira de Freitas, known as Christophe Freitas (born 9 May 1981) is a French professional football player. Currently, he plays in the Championnat de France amateur for FC Martigues.

He played on the professional level in Ligue 2 for Le Mans Union Club 72, before playing in the Championnat National with L'Entente SSG and SO Châtellerault.
