= Gerry Doyle (Irish footballer) =

Irish footballer and manager

Gerry Doyle (16 September 1911 – 3 December 1990) was an Irish football player and manager in Ireland who spent most of his football career with Shelbourne in the League of Ireland.

== Career ==
Doyle was born in Dublin. He managed Shelbourne from the end of the 1956–57 season, having taken over from Eddie Gannon, to October 1965.

Doyle's first spell as Shels manager was a successful one. He promoted a number of the club's 1959 FAI Youth Cup winning team to the first team and his decision was rewarded the following season as Shels claimed the FAI Cup for the second time.

Doyle also took the first ever Shels team into Europe when they played Sporting Clube de Portugal in the European Cup in 1962–63.

He became Dundalk manager in April 1965. After one season at Oriel Park he moved to St Patrick's Athletic in June 1966.

He returned to Shels as manager in August 1967.
