= Freitas (surname) =

Freitas is a very common surname in Madeira Autonomous Region, Portugal. Its origin seems related to the 300-million-year-old 'Birthing Stones' phenomenon which occurs in remote northern Portugal, locally called Pedra Parideira, particularly in the village of Castanheira, nestled into the site of Freita Mountain, Arouca Geopark.

According to the Dictionary of American Family Names citing Oxford University Press, it is a topographic name for someone who lived on a patch of stony ground, from Portuguese (Pedras) Freitas ‘Broken Stones’ Late Latin (Petrae) Fractae.

== Gallery ==
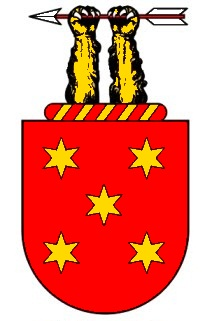
Coat of arms of family name Freitas

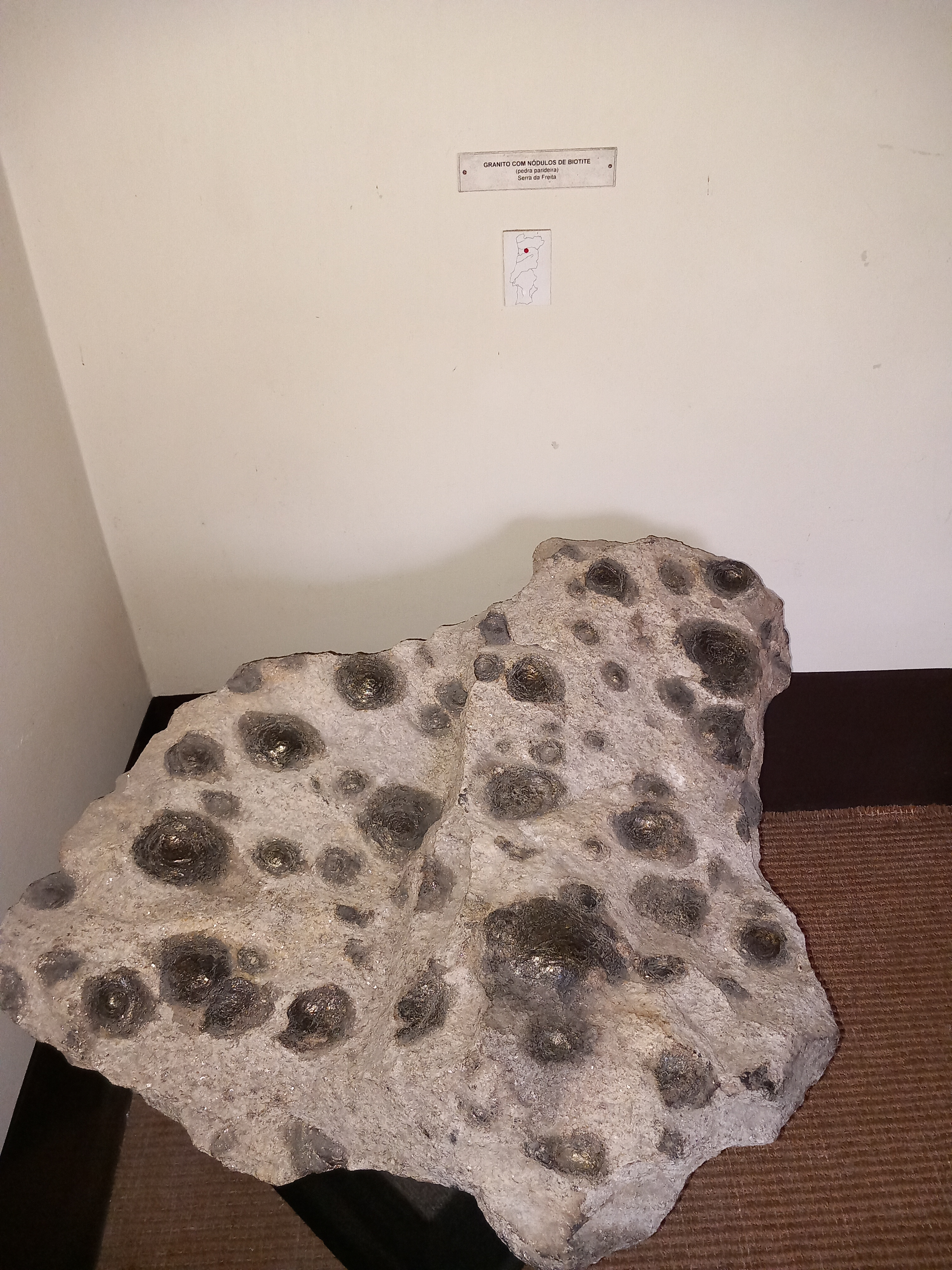
Birthing Stone from Serra da Freita, in the Geological Museum of Lisbon
