= Frank DeFreitas =

American holographer

Frank DeFreitas (born January 1, 1956, in Camden, New Jersey) is the maintainer of the website HoloWorld, aimed at amateur holographers, and author of Shoebox Holography. He instructs people new to holography how to make simple holograms, for example by using a laser pointer.

He started working on holography in 1983 with no formal training in science. He is a 2007 recipient of the International Holography Fund (IHF) grant award program, for the documentation of creative holographic artists through internet broadcasting and has provided laser and holography educational programs for schools, ranging from elementary to university level. He hosts an

+, HoloTalk and has recently begun publishing a free companion e-zine.
