= Jordan de Freitas =

Brazilian footballer and manager

Personal information
- Full name: Jordan de Freitas Viana
- Date of birth: July 3, 1966 (age 60)
- Place of birth: Caratinga, MG, Brazil
- Position: Midfielder

Team information
- Current team: (manager)

Youth career
- 1982-1986: Cruzeiro

Senior career*
Years	Team	Apps	(Gls)
1986-1991	Cruzeiro		
1988	Grêmio Maringá		
1989	Flamengo de Varginha		
1990	Tupi		

Managerial career
- 2002: Atlético Mineiro (U17)
- 2004: Comercial-SP (U17)
- 2005: Ipiranga (U20)
- 2006: Francana (U20)
- 2006: Equatorial Guinea National Team (Assistant)
- 2007–2008: Equatorial Guinea National Team
- 2009: Tombense
- 2011: Tupi
- 2011: Social Futebol Clube
- 2013: Nacional Futebol Clube
- 2014: Tombense (Assistant)
- 2017: Tombense (Youth Coordinator)
- * Club domestic league appearances and goals

Jordan de Freitas Viana (born July 3, 1966) is a Brazilian football manager.

He played for Cruzeiro Esporte Clube, Tupi, Grêmio Maringá and Flamengo de Varginha.

He coached Equatorial Guinea in Africa between 2000 and 2001.
