= Regina Freitas =

Timorese politician (born 1960)

Freitas in 2012

Regina Freitas (born 15 May 1960) is an East Timorese politician. She was a member of the 5th National Parliament of Timor-Leste from 2018 to 2023, representing the People's Liberation Party.

== Early life and education ==
Freitas was born in Osso Huna, Baguia, Baucau Municipality, on 15 May 1960. She attended school until 1974. Until 1979 she was active in youth organizations was a member of FRETILIN and its women's and youth organizations .

== Activism and career ==
She was an active participant in the resistance to the occupation by Indonesia. She was a logistics member then deputy logistics coordinator for Resistance Region III in 1993 and then head of logistics at the Conselho Nacional de Resistência Timorense (CNRT) in 1998. The Indonesians left the country in 1999, after a vote for independence.

From 2003 to 2005, she was head of the president's residence of Xanana Gusmão, who led the CNRT. Freitas founded the Heróis da Pátria school in 2003, and the Aldeia Lacoto preschool in Balibar, a rural village, in 2006, and joined a commission for education regarding AIDS.

From 2009 to 2012, she was a director of "Fretilin Resistência" (Resistance Movement), which she had helped found and she supported Taur Matan Ruak in his successful run for East Timor's fifth president. In 2015, Freitas and the Fretilin Resistência collected signatures of support throughout East Timor for the establishment of the PLP (People's Liberation Party), led by Taur Matan Ruak. In 2016, she became the representative of the women of the Dili community in the PLP and director of the Social Welfare and Health Department of the Câmera de Comércio e Indústria de Timor-Leste (CCI-TL).

In the 2017 parliamentary elections, Freitas was ranked 54th on the PLP list, with no chance of being elected. However, in the 2018 snap elections, she was ranked 30th on the Aliança para Mudança e Progresso (AMP), which also included the PLP, thus securing her a seat in parliament. Freitas was elected to represent the People's Liberation Party in the 5th session of the National Parliament of Timor-Leste, from 2017 to 2023. She also became a member of the Economic and Development Committee (Committee D).

She was not re-elected in the 2023 general election.
