= António A. de Freitas =

Portuguese immunologist

António A. de Freitas (born December 22, 1947), is an immunologist. He is Portuguese, born in Cuamba, Mozambique. He earned his M.D. in 1970 from the University of Lisbon, Portugal, and his Ph.D. in 1976 from the University of Glasgow, Scotland, UK. He is Professor at the Pasteur Institute, Paris, France where he directs a research unit and a URA CNRS. He was head of the Department of Immunology of the Pasteur Institute from 1997-2000. His major scientific contributions are in the area of lymphocyte homeostasis. In 2009 he published a textbook in immunology entitled "Tractus immuno-logicus: a brief history of the immune system". In 2010 received a European Research Council advanced grant.

== Publications ==
- Freitas has been involved in over 130 publications.
