= Pedro Henrique (footballer, born October 1985) =

Brazilian footballer

Personal information
- Full name: Pedro Henrique Carvalho Farias
- Date of birth: October 12, 1985 (age 41)
- Place of birth: Barra do Garças, Brazil
- Height: 1.90 m (6 ft 3 in)
- Position: Goalkeeper

Team information
- Current team: ASA

Youth career
- –2004: Goiás

Senior career*
Years	Team	Apps	(Gls)
2004–2013	Goiás	25	(1)
2007	→ Canedense (loan)	0	(0)
2008	→ CRAC (loan)	0	(0)
2009	→ CRAC (loan)	0	(0)
2010	→ Ituiutaba (loan)	8	(0)
2013	→ Aparecidense (loan)	29	(0)
2014	Aparecidense	14	(0)
2014–	ASA		
- * Club domestic league appearances and goals

Pedro Henrique Carvalho Farias (born October 12, 1985), or simply Pedro Henrique, is a Brazilian footballer who plays as a goalkeeper for Aparecidense.

== Career ==
Plays in the Goiás. Served on the staff of Canedense, in contention for the 2007 Campeonato Goiano.

== Career statistics ==
(Correct as of October 16, 2010)

Club	Season	State League		Brazilian Série A		Copa do Brasil		Copa Sudamericana		Total	
Club	Season	Apps	Goals	Apps	Goals	Apps	Goals	Apps	Goals	Apps	Goals
Ituiutaba	2010	8	0	-	-	-	-	-	-	8	0
Goiás	2010	-	-	0	0	-	-	0	0	0	0
Total		8	0	0	0	-	-	0	0	8	0

== Honours ==
Goiás

- Campeonato Goiano: 2003, 2006, 2009
