= David (footballer, born March 1986) =

Brazilian footballer

Personal information
- Full name: David de Freitas
- Date of birth: March 13, 1986 (age 40)
- Place of birth: Rio de Janeiro, Brazil
- Height: 1.71 m (5 ft 7 in)
- Position: Striker

Team information
- Current team: Ipatinga

Youth career
- 2006–2007: Cruzeiro

Senior career*
Years	Team	Apps	(Gls)
2007	Ipatinga Loan		
- * Club domestic league appearances and goals

David de Freitas or simply David (born March 13, 1986, in Rio de Janeiro), is a Brazilian striker. He currently plays for Ipatinga on loan from Cruzeiro.

== Contract ==
- Ipatinga (Loan) 1 August 2007 to 24 March 2008
- Cruzeiro 26 March 2007 to 25 March 2008
