= Evan Caffrey =

Irish footballer (born 2003)

Personal information
- Date of birth: 27 February 2003 (age 23)
- Place of birth: Dublin, Ireland
- Height: 6 ft 0 in (1.83 m)
- Position: Midfielder

Team information
- Current team: Shelbourne
- Number: 27

Youth career
- 2018–2021: Shamrock Rovers

Senior career*
Years	Team	Apps	(Gls)
2021–2022	UCD	44	(4)
2023–	Shelbourne	138	(9)

International career^{‡}
2021–2022	Republic of Ireland U19	6	(2)
- * Club domestic league appearances and goals as of 19:58, 10 November 2026 ‡ National team caps and goals as of 08:40, 3 July 2025

Evan Caffrey (born 27 February 2003) is an Irish professional footballer who plays as a midfielder for League of Ireland Premier Division club Shelbourne.

== Club career ==
=== Youth career ===
A native of Tallaght, Dublin, Caffrey came through the underage system at Shamrock Rovers, captaining their U15s under Damien Duff in 2018, and playing for their U17s in 2019.

=== UCD ===
In 2021 Caffrey joined League of Ireland First Division club UCD and scored on his debut for them in a 2-1 win over Wexford at the Belfield Bowl on 9 July 2021. He made league 8 appearances in his first season as UCD gained promotion via the play-offs. Irish broadcaster, RTÉ, highlighted Caffrey as UCD's young player to watch for the 2022 Premier Division season. He scored a goal of the season contender to give UCD the victory over Finn Harps in a relegation six-pointer in August 2022. Caffrey featured in every league game and scored 2 league goals for UCD in 2022, as they defeated Waterford in a play-off to retain their Premier Division status.

=== Shelbourne ===
Caffrey signed for Shelbourne in November 2022, reuniting with his former underage manager Damien Duff. In his first season with Shelbourne he made 36 league appearances and scored 2 goals. In November 2023 he penned a fresh two-year deal until the end of the 2025 season. Caffrey scored a 96th minute winner in a league game against St Patrick's Athletic in May 2024, as Shelbourne and Caffrey went on to be crowned Premier Division champions that season. Caffrey made 34 appearances and scored 3 goals in their title-winning campaign. He extended his contract again in February 2025. His manager, Duff, noted that "he has a lot of brilliant qualities and can play many positions which is gold dust." Duff again hailed his character as Caffrey made his 100th appearance for Shelbourne in May 2025, joking that he would "jump off the top of Tolka for the cause".

== Personal life ==
Caffrey's maternal grandfather was former Shelbourne captain Theo Dunne. He is the cousin of fellow professional footballers Richard Dunne and Gavin Molloy. Caffrey attended Old Bawn Community School in Tallaght. He grew up supporting Shamrock Rovers.

== Career statistics ==
As of match played 30 October 2026

Appearances and goals by club, season and competition
Club	Season	League			National cup (Note: Includes FAI Cup)		Europe		Other		Total	
Club	Season	Division	Apps	Goals	Apps	Goals	Apps	Goals	Apps	Goals	Apps	Goals
UCD	2021	LOI First Division	8	2	0	0	—		2 (Note: Appearances in the 2021 League of Ireland First Division Playoffs)	0	10	2
UCD	2022	LOI Premier Division	36	2	3	0	—		1 (Note: Appearance in the 2022 League of Ireland Promotion/Relegation Playoff)	0	40	2
UCD	Total		44	4	3	0	—		3	0	50	4
Shelbourne	2023	LOI Premier Division	36	2	1	0	—		3 (Note: Appearance(s) in the Leinster Senior Cup)	1	40	3
Shelbourne	2024	LOI Premier Division	34	3	3	0	4 (Note: Appearance(s) in the UEFA Conference League)	0	0	0	41	3
Shelbourne	2025	LOI Premier Division	35	3	1	0	13 (Note: 4 appearances in the UEFA Champions League; 1 appearance in the UEFA Europa League; 8 appearances, 1 goal in the UEFA Conference League)	1	1 (Note: Appearance in the President of Ireland's Cup)	0	50	4
Shelbourne	2026	LOI Premier Division	33	1	1	0	4	0	0	0	38	1
Shelbourne	Total		138	9	6	0	21	1	4	1	169	11
Career total			182	13	9	0	21	1	7	1	219	15

== Honours ==
Shelbourne

- League of Ireland Premier Division: 2024
- President of Ireland's Cup: 2025
