= 2025–26 UEFA Champions League =

European football tournament

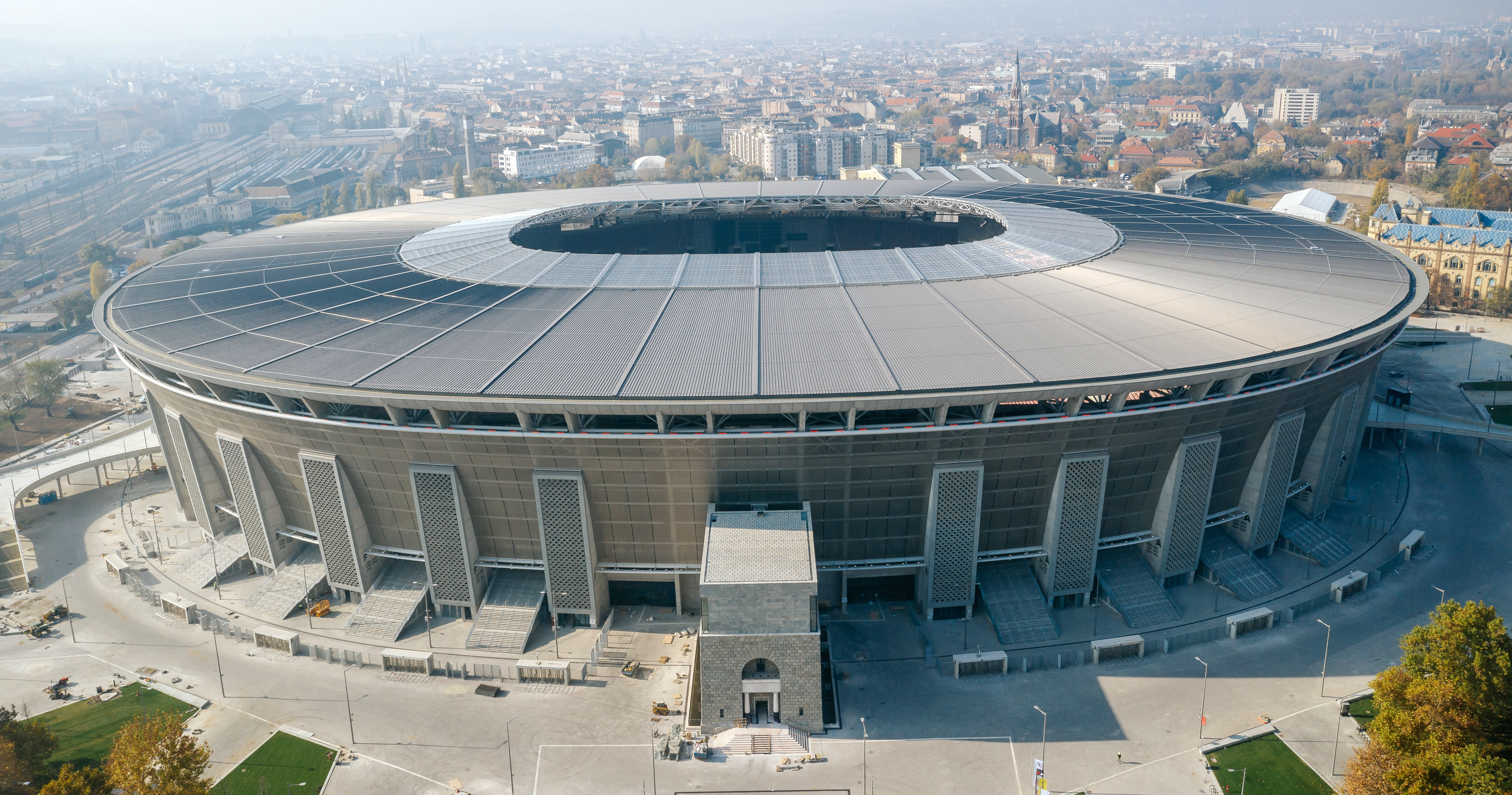
- Puskás Aréna in Budapest hosted the final

Tournament details
- Dates: Qualifying: 8 July – 27 August 2025; Competition proper: 16 September 2025 – 30 May 2026
- Teams: Competition proper: 36; Total: 82 (from 53 associations)

Final positions
- Champions: (France) Paris Saint-Germain (2nd title)
- Runners-up: (England) Arsenal

Tournament statistics
- Matches played: 189
- Goals scored: 655 (3.47 per match)
- Attendance: 8,377,696 (44,326 per match)
- Top scorer(s): Kylian Mbappé (Real Madrid); 15 goals
- Best player: Khvicha Kvaratskhelia (Paris Saint-Germain)
- Best young player: Arda Güler (Real Madrid)

The 2025–26 UEFA Champions League was the 71st season of Europe's premier club football tournament organised by UEFA, and the 34th season since it was rebranded from the European Cup to the UEFA Champions League.

The final was played on 30 May 2026 at Puskás Aréna in Budapest, Hungary. Defending champion Paris Saint-Germain successfully defended the title, defeating Arsenal 4–3 on penalties after a 1–1 draw, to become the second club to win back-to-back titles in the UEFA Champions League era, matching Real Madrid's feat in the 2016–17 edition.

As winners of the Champions League, Paris Saint-Germain automatically qualified for the 2026–27 UEFA Champions League league phase, the 2026 FIFA Intercontinental Cup final and the 2026 UEFA Super Cup. The winners would also have qualified for the 2029 FIFA Club World Cup group stage, however Paris Saint-Germain had already qualified as winners of the previous tournament.

This was the first Champions League season to feature six clubs from one nation, with England earning an extra spot through UEFA coefficient ranking and Tottenham Hotspur having won the previous season's UEFA Europa League.

== Association team allocation ==
A total of 82 teams from 53 of the 55 UEFA member associations participated in the 2025–26 UEFA Champions League (the exceptions being Liechtenstein which did not organise a domestic league and Russia which was suspended). The association ranking based on the UEFA association coefficients was used to determine the number of participating teams for each association:

- Associations 1–5 each had four teams.
- Association 6 had three teams.
- Associations 7–15 each had two teams.
- Associations 16–55 (except Liechtenstein and Russia) each had one team.
- The winners of the 2024–25 UEFA Champions League and 2024–25 UEFA Europa League were each given an additional entry if they did not qualify for the 2025–26 UEFA Champions League through their domestic league.
- The two associations with the best coefficients in the 2024–25 season each had one European Performance Spot into the league phase. The winners of the UEFA Champions League and Europa League could not fill the European Performance Spots.

=== Association ranking ===
For the 2025–26 UEFA Champions League, the associations were allocated places according to their 2024 UEFA association coefficients, which took into account their performance in European competitions from 2019–20 to 2023–24. The table reflects Russia's ongoing suspension from UEFA.

Apart from the allocation based on the association coefficients, associations could have additional teams participating in the Champions League, as noted below:

- (EPS) – European Performance Spot, the additional berths for associations who finished in the top 2 of the 2024–25 association coefficients
- (TH) – Additional berth for UEFA Champions League title holders
- (EL) – Additional berth for UEFA Europa League title holders

Association ranking for 2025–26 UEFA Champions League

Rank	Association	Coeff.	Teams	Notes
1	England	104.303	4	+1 (EPS) +1 (EL)
2	Italy	90.284	4	
3	Spain	89.489	4	+1 (EPS)
4	Germany	86.624	4	
5	France	66.831	4	
6	Netherlands	61.300	3	
7	Portugal	56.316	2	
8	Belgium	48.800	2	
9	Turkey	38.600	2	
10	Czech Republic	36.050	2	
11	Scotland	36.050	2	
12	Switzerland	32.975	2	
13	Austria	32.600	2	
14	Norway	31.625	2	
15	Greece	31.525	2	
16	Denmark	31.450	1	
17	Israel	31.125	1	
18	Ukraine	28.000	1	
19	Serbia	27.775	1	

Rank	Association	Coeff.	Teams	Notes
20	Croatia	25.525	1	
21	Poland	25.375	1	
22	Russia	22.965	0	
23	Cyprus	22.100	1	
24	Hungary	21.875	1	
25	Sweden	21.500	1	
26	Romania	21.375	1	
27	Bulgaria	20.375	1	
28	Azerbaijan	20.125	1	
29	Slovakia	19.625	1	
30	Slovenia	13.250	1	
31	Moldova	13.125	1	
32	Kosovo	11.541	1	
33	Kazakhstan	11.500	1	
34	Finland	11.125	1	
35	Republic of Ireland	10.875	1	
36	Armenia	10.625	1	
37	Latvia	10.625	1	
38	Faroe Islands	10.375	1	

Rank	Association	Coeff.	Teams	Notes
39	Bosnia and Herzegovina	10.000	1	
40	Liechtenstein	10.000	0	
41	Iceland	9.583	1	
42	Northern Ireland	9.208	1	
43	Luxembourg	8.625	1	
44	Lithuania	8.500	1	
45	Malta	8.250	1	
46	Georgia	7.625	1	
47	Albania	7.375	1	
48	Estonia	7.207	1	
49	Belarus	6.625	1	
50	North Macedonia	6.000	1	
51	Andorra	5.998	1	
52	Wales	5.791	1	
53	Montenegro	5.708	1	
54	Gibraltar	4.957	1	
55	San Marino	1.832	1	

=== Distribution ===
		Teams entering in this round	Teams advancing from the previous round
First qualifying round (28 teams)		28 champions from associations 25–27 and 30–55 (except Liechtenstein)	
Second qualifying round (30 teams)	Champions Path (24 teams)	8 champions from associations 16–24 (except Russia); 2 champions from associations 28 and 29 as the teams with the highest club coefficients, originally from the first qualification round	14 winners from the first qualifying round
Second qualifying round (30 teams)	League Path (6 teams)	6 runners-up from associations 10–15	
Third qualifying round (20 teams)	Champions Path (12 teams)		12 winners from the second qualifying round (Champions Path)
Third qualifying round (20 teams)	League Path (8 teams)	3 runners-up from associations 7–9; 1 third-placed team from association 6; 1 fourth-placed team from association 5	3 winners from the second qualifying round (League Path)
Play-off round (14 teams)	Champions Path (10 teams)	4 champions from associations 11–14	6 winners from the third qualifying round (Champions Path)
Play-off round (14 teams)	League Path (4 teams)		4 winners from the third qualifying round (League Path)
League phase (36 teams)		UEFA Europa League title holders; 2 associations with the highest coefficients from the previous season received an extra Champions League league phase berth.; 10 champions from associations 1–10; 6 runners-up from associations 1–6; 5 third-placed teams from associations 1–5; 4 fourth-placed teams from associations 1–4; 1 champion from association 15 as the team with the highest club coefficient, originally from the second round of the Champions Path	5 winners from the play-off round (Champions Path); 2 winners from the play-off round (League Path)
Knockout phase play-offs (16 teams)			16 teams ranked 9–24 from the league phase
Round of 16 (16 teams)			8 teams ranked 1–8 from the league phase; 8 winners from the knockout phase play-offs

The information here reflects the ongoing suspension of Russia in European football, and so the following changes to the default access list were made:

- The champions of associations 23 (Cyprus) and 24 (Hungary) entered the second qualifying round (Champions Path) instead of the first qualifying round.

As the Champions League title holders (Paris Saint-Germain) qualified via their domestic league's standard berth allocation, the following changes to the default access list were made:

- Olympiacos as the club with the highest club coefficient that would otherwise have entered the Champions Path of the qualifying phase or play-off round, entered the league phase instead of the Champions Path second qualifying round.
- Slovan Bratislava and Qarabağ, as the two clubs with the highest club coefficient that would otherwise have entered the Champions Path first qualifying round, entered the Champions Path second qualifying round.

=== Teams ===
The labels in the parentheses show how each team qualified for the place of its starting round:

- TH: Champions League title holders
- EL: Europa League title holders
- 1st, 2nd, 3rd, 4th, etc.: League positions of the previous season
- EPS: European Performance Spots – the additional berths given to clubs from the two associations with the highest coefficient points in 2024–25

The label of European Performance Spots and title holders already qualified via league position are superscripted.

The second qualifying round, third qualifying round and play-off round were divided into Champions Path (CH) and League Path (LP).

Qualified teams for 2025–26 UEFA Champions League
Entry round		Teams			
League phase		(France) Paris Saint-Germain (1st)^{TH}	(England) Tottenham Hotspur (EL)	(England) Liverpool (1st)	(England) Arsenal (2nd)
League phase		(England) Manchester City (3rd)	(England) Chelsea (4th)	(England) Newcastle United (5th)^{EPS}	(Italy) Napoli (1st)
League phase		(Italy) Inter Milan (2nd)	(Italy) Atalanta (3rd)	(Italy) Juventus (4th)	(Spain) Barcelona (1st)
League phase		(Spain) Real Madrid (2nd)	(Spain) Atlético Madrid (3rd)	(Spain) Athletic Bilbao (4th)	(Spain) Villarreal (5th)^{EPS}
League phase		(Germany) Bayern Munich (1st)	(Germany) Bayer Leverkusen (2nd)	(Germany) Eintracht Frankfurt (3rd)	(Germany) Borussia Dortmund (4th)
League phase		(France) Marseille (2nd)	(France) Monaco (3rd)	(Netherlands) PSV Eindhoven (1st)	(Netherlands) Ajax (2nd)
League phase		(Portugal) Sporting CP (1st)	(Belgium) Union Saint-Gilloise (1st)	(Turkey) Galatasaray (1st)	(Czech Republic) Slavia Prague (1st)
League phase		(Greece) Olympiacos (1st)			
Play-off round	CH	(Scotland) Celtic (1st)	(Switzerland) Basel (1st)	(Austria) Sturm Graz (1st)	(Norway) Bodø/Glimt (1st)
Third qualifying round	LP	(France) Nice (4th)	(Netherlands) Feyenoord (3rd)	(Portugal) Benfica (2nd)	(Belgium) Club Brugge (2nd)
Third qualifying round	LP	(Turkey) Fenerbahçe (2nd)			
Second qualifying round	CH	(Denmark) Copenhagen (1st)	(Israel) Maccabi Tel Aviv (1st)	(Ukraine) Dynamo Kyiv (1st)	(Serbia) Red Star Belgrade (1st)
Second qualifying round	CH	(Croatia) Rijeka (1st)	(Poland) Lech Poznań (1st)	(Cyprus) Pafos (1st)	(Hungary) Ferencváros (1st)
Second qualifying round	CH	(Azerbaijan) Qarabağ (1st)	(Slovakia) Slovan Bratislava (1st)		
Second qualifying round	LP	(Czech Republic) Viktoria Plzeň (2nd)	(Scotland) Rangers (2nd)	(Switzerland) Servette (2nd)	(Austria) Red Bull Salzburg (2nd)
Second qualifying round	LP	(Norway) Brann (2nd)	(Greece) Panathinaikos (2nd)		
First qualifying round	CH	(Sweden) Malmö FF (1st)	(Romania) FCSB (1st)	(Bulgaria) Ludogorets Razgrad (1st)	(Slovenia) Olimpija Ljubljana (1st)
First qualifying round	CH	(Moldova) Milsami Orhei (1st)	(Kosovo) Drita (1st)	(Kazakhstan) Kairat (1st)	(Finland) KuPS (1st)
First qualifying round	CH	(Republic of Ireland) Shelbourne (1st)	(Armenia) Noah (1st)	(Latvia) RFS (1st)	(Faroe Islands) Víkingur Gøta (1st)
First qualifying round	CH	(Bosnia and Herzegovina) Zrinjski Mostar (1st)	(Iceland) Breiðablik (1st)	(Northern Ireland) Linfield (1st)	(Luxembourg) Differdange 03 (1st)
First qualifying round	CH	(Lithuania) Žalgiris (1st)	(Malta) Hamrun Spartans (1st)	(Georgia (country)) Iberia 1999 (1st)	(Albania) Egnatia (1st)
First qualifying round	CH	(Estonia) Levadia Tallinn (1st)	(Belarus) Dinamo Minsk (1st)	(North Macedonia) Shkëndija (1st)	(Andorra) Inter Club d'Escaldes (1st)
First qualifying round	CH	(Wales) The New Saints (1st)	(Montenegro) Budućnost Podgorica (1st)	(Gibraltar) Lincoln Red Imps (1st)	(San Marino) Virtus (1st)

1. Liechtenstein (LIE): The seven teams affiliated with the Liechtenstein Football Association (LFV) all played in the Swiss football league system. The only competition organised by the LFV was the Liechtenstein Football Cup – the winners of which qualified for the UEFA Conference League for the 2025–26 season.
2. Russia (RUS): On 28 February 2022, Russian football clubs and national teams were suspended from FIFA and UEFA competitions due to the Russian invasion of Ukraine. The tables reflect Russia's ongoing suspension from UEFA competitions.

== Schedule ==
The schedule of the competition was as follows. One "exclusive week" was held in which Thursday was also a matchday. All matches in other weeks were played on Tuesdays and Wednesdays apart from Matchday 8 (Wednesday only) and the final.

Schedule for 2025–26 UEFA Champions League
Phase	Round	Draw date	First leg	Second leg
Qualifying	First qualifying round	17 June 2025	8–9 July 2025	15–16 July 2025
Qualifying	Second qualifying round	18 June 2025	22–23 July 2025	29–30 July 2025
Qualifying	Third qualifying round	21 July 2025	5–6 August 2025	12 August 2025
Play-offs	Play-off round	4 August 2025	19–20 August 2025	26–27 August 2025
League phase	Matchday 1	28 August 2025	16–18 September 2025	
League phase	Matchday 2	28 August 2025	30 September – 1 October 2025	
League phase	Matchday 3	28 August 2025	21–22 October 2025	
League phase	Matchday 4	28 August 2025	4–5 November 2025	
League phase	Matchday 5	28 August 2025	25–26 November 2025	
League phase	Matchday 6	28 August 2025	9–10 December 2025	
League phase	Matchday 7	28 August 2025	20–21 January 2026	
League phase	Matchday 8	28 August 2025	28 January 2026	
Knockout phase	Knockout phase play-offs	30 January 2026	17–18 February 2026	24–25 February 2026
Knockout phase	Round of 16	27 February 2026	10–11 March 2026	17–18 March 2026
Knockout phase	Quarter-finals	—N/a	7–8 April 2026	14–15 April 2026
Knockout phase	Semi-finals	—N/a	28–29 April 2026	5–6 May 2026
Knockout phase	Final	—N/a	30 May 2026 at Puskás Aréna, Budapest	

== Qualifying rounds ==
=== First qualifying round ===
The draw for the first qualifying round was held on 17 June 2025. The first legs were played on 8 and 9 July, and the second legs were played on 15 and 16 July 2025.

The winners of the ties advanced to the Champions Path second qualifying round. Twelve of the losing teams were transferred to the Conference League Champions Path second qualifying round, and the other two losing teams (selected via a draw) were transferred to the Conference League Champions Path third qualifying round.

First qualifying round
Team 1	Agg.	Team 2	1st leg	2nd leg
Žalgiris (Lithuania)	2–2 (10–11 p)	(Malta) Hamrun Spartans	2–0	0–2 (a.e.t.)
KuPS (Finland)	1–0	(Moldova) Milsami Orhei	1–0	0–0
The New Saints (Wales)	1–2	(North Macedonia) Shkëndija	0–0	1–2 (a.e.t.)
Iberia 1999 (Georgia (country))	2–6	(Sweden) Malmö FF	1–3	1–3
FCI Levadia (Estonia)	0–2	(Latvia) RFS	0–1	0–1
Drita (Kosovo)	4–2	(Luxembourg) Differdange 03	1–0	3–2
Víkingur Gøta (Faroe Islands)	2–4	(Gibraltar) Lincoln Red Imps	2–3	0–1
Egnatia (Albania)	1–5	(Iceland) Breiðablik	1–0	0–5
Shelbourne (Republic of Ireland)	2–1	(Northern Ireland) Linfield	1–0	1–1
FCSB (Romania)	4–3	(Andorra) Inter Club d'Escaldes	3–1	1–2
Virtus (San Marino)	1–4	(Bosnia and Herzegovina) Zrinjski Mostar	0–2	1–2
Olimpija Ljubljana (Slovenia)	1–3	(Kazakhstan) Kairat	1–1	0–2
Noah (Armenia)	3–2	(Montenegro) Budućnost Podgorica	1–0	2–2
Ludogorets Razgrad (Bulgaria)	3–2	(Belarus) Dinamo Minsk	1–0	2–2 (a.e.t.)

=== Second qualifying round ===
The draw for the second qualifying round was held on 18 June 2025. The first legs were played on 22 and 23 July, and the second legs were played on 29 and 30 July 2025.

The winners of the ties advanced to the third qualifying round. The losers were transferred to the Europa League third qualifying round.

Second qualifying round
Team 1	Agg.	Team 2	1st leg	2nd leg
Champions Path
RFS (Latvia)	1–5	(Sweden) Malmö FF	1–4	0–1
Hamrun Spartans (Malta)	0–6	(Ukraine) Dynamo Kyiv	0–3	0–3
Pafos (Cyprus)	2–1	(Israel) Maccabi Tel Aviv	1–1	1–0
Lincoln Red Imps (Gibraltar)	1–6	(Serbia) Red Star Belgrade	0–1	1–5
Noah (Armenia)	4–6	(Hungary) Ferencváros	1–2	3–4
Lech Poznań (Poland)	8–1	(Iceland) Breiðablik	7–1	1–0
Copenhagen (Denmark)	3–0	(Kosovo) Drita	2–0	1–0
Rijeka (Croatia)	1–3	(Bulgaria) Ludogorets Razgrad	0–0	1–3 (a.e.t.)
Shkëndija (North Macedonia)	3–1	(Romania) FCSB	1–0	2–1
Slovan Bratislava (Slovakia)	6–2	(Bosnia and Herzegovina) Zrinjski Mostar	4–0	2–2
Shelbourne (Republic of Ireland)	0–4	(Azerbaijan) Qarabağ	0–3	0–1
KuPS (Finland)	2–3	(Kazakhstan) Kairat	2–0	0–3
League Path
Brann (Norway)	2–5	(Austria) Red Bull Salzburg	1–4	1–1
Viktoria Plzeň (Czech Republic)	3–2	(Switzerland) Servette	0–1	3–1
Rangers (Scotland)	3–1	(Greece) Panathinaikos	2–0	1–1

=== Third qualifying round ===
The draw for the third qualifying round was held on 21 July 2025. The first legs were played on 5 and 6 August, and the second legs were played on 12 August 2025.

The winners of the ties advanced to the play-off round. The losers of the Champions Path were transferred to the Europa League play-off round. The losers of the League Path were transferred to the Europa League league phase.

Third qualifying round
Team 1	Agg.	Team 2	1st leg	2nd leg
Champions Path
Malmö FF (Sweden)	0–5	(Denmark) Copenhagen	0–0	0–5
Kairat (Kazakhstan)	1–1 (4–3 p)	(Slovakia) Slovan Bratislava	1–0	0–1 (a.e.t.)
Lech Poznań (Poland)	2–4	(Serbia) Red Star Belgrade	1–3	1–1
Ludogorets Razgrad (Bulgaria)	0–3	(Hungary) Ferencváros	0–0	0–3
Dynamo Kyiv (Ukraine)	0–3	(Cyprus) Pafos	0–1	0–2
Shkëndija (North Macedonia)	1–6	(Azerbaijan) Qarabağ	0–1	1–5
League Path
Red Bull Salzburg (Austria)	2–4	(Belgium) Club Brugge	0–1	2–3
Rangers (Scotland)	4–2	(Czech Republic) Viktoria Plzeň	3–0	1–2
Nice (France)	0–4	(Portugal) Benfica	0–2	0–2
Feyenoord (Netherlands)	4–6	(Turkey) Fenerbahçe	2–1	2–5

== Play-off round ==
The draw for the play-off round was held on 4 August 2025. The first legs were played on 19 and 20 August, and the second legs were played on 26 and 27 August 2025.

The winners of the ties advanced to the league phase. The losers were transferred to the Europa League league phase.

Play-off round
Team 1	Agg.	Team 2	1st leg	2nd leg
Champions Path
Ferencváros (Hungary)	4–5	(Azerbaijan) Qarabağ	1–3	3–2
Red Star Belgrade (Serbia)	2–3	(Cyprus) Pafos	1–2	1–1
Bodø/Glimt (Norway)	6–2	(Austria) Sturm Graz	5–0	1–2
Celtic (Scotland)	0–0 (2–3 p)	(Kazakhstan) Kairat	0–0	0–0 (a.e.t.)
Basel (Switzerland)	1–3	(Denmark) Copenhagen	1–1	0–2
League Path
Fenerbahçe (Turkey)	0–1	(Portugal) Benfica	0–0	0–1
Rangers (Scotland)	1–9	(Belgium) Club Brugge	1–3	0–6

== League phase ==
Location of Benelux teams in the 2025–26 UEFA Champions League league phase
Location of Greater London clubs in the 2025–26 UEFA Champions League league phase
Location of teams in the 2025–26 UEFA Champions League league phase

The league phase draw for the 2025–26 UEFA Champions League took place at the Grimaldi Forum in Monaco on 28 August 2025. The 36 teams were divided into four pots of nine teams each based on their UEFA club coefficient, except for the Champions League title holders, who were automatically placed as the top seed in pot 1.

The 36 teams were manually drawn and then automated software drew their eight different opponents at random, determining which of their matches were at home and which ones away. Each team faced two opponents from each of the four pots, one at home and one away. Teams could not face opponents from their own association, and could only be drawn against a maximum of two sides from the same association.

Bodø/Glimt, Kairat, Pafos and Union Saint-Gilloise made their debut appearances in the league phase/group stage. Kairat, based in Almaty, became the easternmost team to ever qualify for the Champions League proper, and, after being drawn to play away against Sporting CP, broke the record for the longest trip in UEFA competitions, travelling 4,294 miles (6,911 km) from Almaty to Lisbon. In addition, Bodø/Glimt, based in Bodø within the Arctic Circle, became the northernmost European team to ever compete in the Champions League. This marked the first time a Norwegian team participated in the competition proper since the 2007–08 season, and was also the first season since 2005–06 in which no Ukrainian sides qualified for the group stage/league phase.

A total of 16 national associations were represented in the league phase.

=== Table ===
The top eight ranked teams received a bye directly to the round of 16. Teams ranked from 9th to 24th contested the knockout phase play-offs, with teams ranked from 9th to 16th seeded for the draw. Teams ranked from 25th to 36th were eliminated from all competitions.

Pos	Team	Pld	W	D	L	GF	GA	GD	Pts	Qualification
1	(The Football Association) Arsenal	8	8	0	0	23	4	+19	24	Advance to round of 16 (seeded)
2	(German Football Association) Bayern Munich	8	7	0	1	22	8	+14	21	Advance to round of 16 (seeded)
3	(The Football Association) Liverpool	8	6	0	2	20	8	+12	18	Advance to round of 16 (seeded)
4	(The Football Association) Tottenham Hotspur	8	5	2	1	17	7	+10	17	Advance to round of 16 (seeded)
5	(Royal Spanish Football Federation) Barcelona	8	5	1	2	22	14	+8	16	Advance to round of 16 (seeded)
6	(The Football Association) Chelsea	8	5	1	2	17	10	+7	16	Advance to round of 16 (seeded)
7	(Portuguese Football Federation) Sporting CP	8	5	1	2	17	11	+6	16	Advance to round of 16 (seeded)
8	(The Football Association) Manchester City	8	5	1	2	15	9	+6	16	Advance to round of 16 (seeded)
9	(Royal Spanish Football Federation) Real Madrid	8	5	0	3	21	12	+9	15	Advance to knockout phase play-offs (seeded)
10	(Italian Football Federation) Inter Milan	8	5	0	3	15	7	+8	15	Advance to knockout phase play-offs (seeded)
11	(French Football Federation) Paris Saint-Germain	8	4	2	2	21	11	+10	14	Advance to knockout phase play-offs (seeded)
12	(The Football Association) Newcastle United	8	4	2	2	17	7	+10	14	Advance to knockout phase play-offs (seeded)
13	(Italian Football Federation) Juventus	8	3	4	1	14	10	+4	13	Advance to knockout phase play-offs (seeded)
14	(Royal Spanish Football Federation) Atlético Madrid	8	4	1	3	17	15	+2	13	Advance to knockout phase play-offs (seeded)
15	(Italian Football Federation) Atalanta	8	4	1	3	10	10	0	13	Advance to knockout phase play-offs (seeded)
16	(German Football Association) Bayer Leverkusen	8	3	3	2	13	14	−1	12	Advance to knockout phase play-offs (seeded)
17	(German Football Association) Borussia Dortmund	8	3	2	3	19	17	+2	11	Advance to knockout phase play-offs (unseeded)
18	(Hellenic Football Federation) Olympiacos	8	3	2	3	10	14	−4	11	Advance to knockout phase play-offs (unseeded)
19	(Royal Belgian Football Association) Club Brugge	8	3	1	4	15	17	−2	10	Advance to knockout phase play-offs (unseeded)
20	(Turkish Football Federation) Galatasaray	8	3	1	4	9	11	−2	10	Advance to knockout phase play-offs (unseeded)
21	(French Football Federation) Monaco	8	2	4	2	8	14	−6	10	Advance to knockout phase play-offs (unseeded)
22	(Association of Football Federations of Azerbaijan) Qarabağ	8	3	1	4	13	21	−8	10	Advance to knockout phase play-offs (unseeded)
23	(Norwegian Football Federation) Bodø/Glimt	8	2	3	3	14	15	−1	9	Advance to knockout phase play-offs (unseeded)
24	(Portuguese Football Federation) Benfica	8	3	0	5	10	12	−2	9	Advance to knockout phase play-offs (unseeded)
25	(French Football Federation) Marseille	8	3	0	5	11	14	−3	9	
26	(Cyprus Football Association) Pafos	8	2	3	3	8	11	−3	9	
27	(Royal Belgian Football Association) Union Saint-Gilloise	8	3	0	5	8	17	−9	9	
28	(Royal Dutch Football Association) PSV Eindhoven	8	2	2	4	16	16	0	8	
29	(Royal Spanish Football Federation) Athletic Bilbao	8	2	2	4	9	14	−5	8	
30	(Italian Football Federation) Napoli	8	2	2	4	9	15	−6	8	
31	(Danish Football Association) Copenhagen	8	2	2	4	12	21	−9	8	
32	(Royal Dutch Football Association) Ajax	8	2	0	6	8	21	−13	6	
33	(German Football Association) Eintracht Frankfurt	8	1	1	6	10	21	−11	4	
34	(Football Association of the Czech Republic) Slavia Prague	8	0	3	5	5	19	−14	3	
35	(Royal Spanish Football Federation) Villarreal	8	0	1	7	5	18	−13	1	
36	(Kazakhstan Football Federation) Kairat	8	0	1	7	7	22	−15	1	

Source: UEFA
Rules for classification: League phase tiebreakers

=== Results ===
Matchday 1
Home team	Score	Away team
Athletic Bilbao (Spain)	0–2	(England) Arsenal
PSV Eindhoven (Netherlands)	1–3	(Belgium) Union Saint‑Gilloise
Juventus (Italy)	4–4	(Germany) Borussia Dortmund
Real Madrid (Spain)	2–1	(France) Marseille
Benfica (Portugal)	2–3	(Azerbaijan) Qarabağ
Tottenham Hotspur (England)	1–0	(Spain) Villarreal
Olympiacos (Greece)	0–0	(Cyprus) Pafos
Slavia Prague (Czech Republic)	2–2	(Norway) Bodø/Glimt
Ajax (Netherlands)	0–2	(Italy) Inter Milan
Bayern Munich (Germany)	3–1	(England) Chelsea
Liverpool (England)	3–2	(Spain) Atlético Madrid
Paris Saint-Germain (France)	4–0	(Italy) Atalanta
Club Brugge (Belgium)	4–1	(France) Monaco
Copenhagen (Denmark)	2–2	(Germany) Bayer Leverkusen
Eintracht Frankfurt (Germany)	5–1	(Turkey) Galatasaray
Manchester City (England)	2–0	(Italy) Napoli
Newcastle United (England)	1–2	(Spain) Barcelona
Sporting CP (Portugal)	4–1	(Kazakhstan) Kairat

Matchday 2
Home team	Score	Away team
Atalanta (Italy)	2–1	(Belgium) Club Brugge
Kairat (Kazakhstan)	0–5	(Spain) Real Madrid
Atlético Madrid (Spain)	5–1	(Germany) Eintracht Frankfurt
Chelsea (England)	1–0	(Portugal) Benfica
Inter Milan (Italy)	3–0	(Czech Republic) Slavia Prague
Bodø/Glimt (Norway)	2–2	(England) Tottenham Hotspur
Galatasaray (Turkey)	1–0	(England) Liverpool
Marseille (France)	4–0	(Netherlands) Ajax
Pafos (Cyprus)	1–5	(Germany) Bayern Munich
Qarabağ (Azerbaijan)	2–0	(Denmark) Copenhagen
Union Saint-Gilloise (Belgium)	0–4	(England) Newcastle United
Arsenal (England)	2–0	(Greece) Olympiacos
Monaco (France)	2–2	(England) Manchester City
Bayer Leverkusen (Germany)	1–1	(Netherlands) PSV Eindhoven
Borussia Dortmund (Germany)	4–1	(Spain) Athletic Bilbao
Barcelona (Spain)	1–2	(France) Paris Saint-Germain
Napoli (Italy)	2–1	(Portugal) Sporting CP
Villarreal (Spain)	2–2	(Italy) Juventus

Matchday 3
Home team	Score	Away team
Barcelona (Spain)	6–1	(Greece) Olympiacos
Kairat (Kazakhstan)	0–0	(Cyprus) Pafos
Arsenal (England)	4–0	(Spain) Atlético Madrid
Bayer Leverkusen (Germany)	2–7	(France) Paris Saint‑Germain
Copenhagen (Denmark)	2–4	(Germany) Borussia Dortmund
Newcastle United (England)	3–0	(Portugal) Benfica
PSV Eindhoven (Netherlands)	6–2	(Italy) Napoli
Union Saint-Gilloise (Belgium)	0–4	(Italy) Inter Milan
Villarreal (Spain)	0–2	(England) Manchester City
Athletic Bilbao (Spain)	3–1	(Azerbaijan) Qarabağ
Galatasaray (Turkey)	3–1	(Norway) Bodø/Glimt
Monaco (France)	0–0	(England) Tottenham Hotspur
Atalanta (Italy)	0–0	(Czech Republic) Slavia Prague
Chelsea (England)	5–1	(Netherlands) Ajax
Eintracht Frankfurt (Germany)	1–5	(England) Liverpool
Bayern Munich (Germany)	4–0	(Belgium) Club Brugge
Real Madrid (Spain)	1–0	(Italy) Juventus
Sporting CP (Portugal)	2–1	(France) Marseille

Matchday 4
Home team	Score	Away team
Slavia Prague (Czech Republic)	0–3	(England) Arsenal
Napoli (Italy)	0–0	(Germany) Eintracht Frankfurt
Atlético Madrid (Spain)	3–1	(Belgium) Union Saint-Gilloise
Bodø/Glimt (Norway)	0–1	(France) Monaco
Juventus (Italy)	1–1	(Portugal) Sporting CP
Liverpool (England)	1–0	(Spain) Real Madrid
Olympiacos (Greece)	1–1	(Netherlands) PSV Eindhoven
Paris Saint-Germain (France)	1–2	(Germany) Bayern Munich
Tottenham Hotspur (England)	4–0	(Denmark) Copenhagen
Pafos (Cyprus)	1–0	(Spain) Villarreal
Qarabağ (Azerbaijan)	2–2	(England) Chelsea
Ajax (Netherlands)	0–3	(Turkey) Galatasaray
Club Brugge (Belgium)	3–3	(Spain) Barcelona
Inter Milan (Italy)	2–1	(Kazakhstan) Kairat
Manchester City (England)	4–1	(Germany) Borussia Dortmund
Newcastle United (England)	2–0	(Spain) Athletic Bilbao
Marseille (France)	0–1	(Italy) Atalanta
Benfica (Portugal)	0–1	(Germany) Bayer Leverkusen

Matchday 5
Home team	Score	Away team
Ajax (Netherlands)	0–2	(Portugal) Benfica
Galatasaray (Turkey)	0–1	(Belgium) Union Saint‑Gilloise
Borussia Dortmund (Germany)	4–0	(Spain) Villarreal
Chelsea (England)	3–0	(Spain) Barcelona
Bodø/Glimt (Norway)	2–3	(Italy) Juventus
Manchester City (England)	0–2	(Germany) Bayer Leverkusen
Marseille (France)	2–1	(England) Newcastle United
Slavia Prague (Czech Republic)	0–0	(Spain) Athletic Bilbao
Napoli (Italy)	2–0	(Azerbaijan) Qarabağ
Copenhagen (Denmark)	3–2	(Kazakhstan) Kairat
Pafos (Cyprus)	2–2	(France) Monaco
Arsenal (England)	3–1	(Germany) Bayern Munich
Atlético Madrid (Spain)	2–1	(Italy) Inter Milan
Eintracht Frankfurt (Germany)	0–3	(Italy) Atalanta
Liverpool (England)	1–4	(Netherlands) PSV Eindhoven
Olympiacos (Greece)	3–4	(Spain) Real Madrid
Paris Saint-Germain (France)	5–3	(England) Tottenham Hotspur
Sporting CP (Portugal)	3–0	(Belgium) Club Brugge

Matchday 6
Home team	Score	Away team
Kairat (Kazakhstan)	0–1	(Greece) Olympiacos
Bayern Munich (Germany)	3–1	(Portugal) Sporting CP
Monaco (France)	1–0	(Turkey) Galatasaray
Atalanta (Italy)	2–1	(England) Chelsea
Barcelona (Spain)	2–1	(Germany) Eintracht Frankfurt
Inter Milan (Italy)	0–1	(England) Liverpool
PSV Eindhoven (Netherlands)	2–3	(Spain) Atlético Madrid
Union Saint-Gilloise (Belgium)	2–3	(France) Marseille
Tottenham Hotspur (England)	3–0	(Czech Republic) Slavia Prague
Qarabağ (Azerbaijan)	2–4	(Netherlands) Ajax
Villarreal (Spain)	2–3	(Denmark) Copenhagen
Athletic Bilbao (Spain)	0–0	(France) Paris Saint-Germain
Bayer Leverkusen (Germany)	2–2	(England) Newcastle United
Borussia Dortmund (Germany)	2–2	(Norway) Bodø/Glimt
Club Brugge (Belgium)	0–3	(England) Arsenal
Juventus (Italy)	2–0	(Cyprus) Pafos
Real Madrid (Spain)	1–2	(England) Manchester City
Benfica (Portugal)	2–0	(Italy) Napoli

Matchday 7
Home team	Score	Away team
Kairat (Kazakhstan)	1–4	(Belgium) Club Brugge
Bodø/Glimt (Norway)	3–1	(England) Manchester City
Copenhagen (Denmark)	1–1	(Italy) Napoli
Inter Milan (Italy)	1–3	(England) Arsenal
Olympiacos (Greece)	2–0	(Germany) Bayer Leverkusen
Real Madrid (Spain)	6–1	(France) Monaco
Sporting CP (Portugal)	2–1	(France) Paris Saint-Germain
Tottenham Hotspur (England)	2–0	(Germany) Borussia Dortmund
Villarreal (Spain)	1–2	(Netherlands) Ajax
Galatasaray (Turkey)	1–1	(Spain) Atlético Madrid
Qarabağ (Azerbaijan)	3–2	(Germany) Eintracht Frankfurt
Atalanta (Italy)	2–3	(Spain) Athletic Bilbao
Chelsea (England)	1–0	(Cyprus) Pafos
Bayern Munich (Germany)	2–0	(Belgium) Union Saint-Gilloise
Juventus (Italy)	2–0	(Portugal) Benfica
Newcastle United (England)	3–0	(Netherlands) PSV Eindhoven
Marseille (France)	0–3	(England) Liverpool
Slavia Prague (Czech Republic)	2–4	(Spain) Barcelona

Matchday 8
Home team	Score	Away team
Ajax (Netherlands)	1–2	(Greece) Olympiacos
Arsenal (England)	3–2	(Kazakhstan) Kairat
Monaco (France)	0–0	(Italy) Juventus
Athletic Bilbao (Spain)	2–3	(Portugal) Sporting CP
Atlético Madrid (Spain)	1–2	(Norway) Bodø/Glimt
Bayer Leverkusen (Germany)	3–0	(Spain) Villarreal
Borussia Dortmund (Germany)	0–2	(Italy) Inter Milan
Club Brugge (Belgium)	3–0	(France) Marseille
Eintracht Frankfurt (Germany)	0–2	(England) Tottenham Hotspur
Barcelona (Spain)	4–1	(Denmark) Copenhagen
Liverpool (England)	6–0	(Azerbaijan) Qarabağ
Manchester City (England)	2–0	(Turkey) Galatasaray
Pafos (Cyprus)	4–1	(Czech Republic) Slavia Prague
Paris Saint-Germain (France)	1–1	(England) Newcastle United
PSV Eindhoven (Netherlands)	1–2	(Germany) Bayern Munich
Union Saint-Gilloise (Belgium)	1–0	(Italy) Atalanta
Benfica (Portugal)	4–2	(Spain) Real Madrid
Napoli (Italy)	2–3	(England) Chelsea

== Knockout phase ==
In the knockout phase, teams played against each other over two legs on a home-and-away basis, except for the one-match final. The top eight teams from the final standings in the league phase entered at the round of 16. In the knockout phase, there was no country protection, with teams from the same association able to face each other in any round. Teams could also face opponents they played during the league phase.

The mechanism of the draws for each round was as follows:

- In the draw for the knockout phase play-offs, the eight teams finishing the league phase in positions 9–16 were seeded, and the eight teams finishing the league phase in positions 17–24 were unseeded. The draw was split into four sections based on the predetermined bracket, with the seeded teams in each section drawn against one of their two possible unseeded opponents. The seeded teams hosted the second leg.
- In the draw for the round of 16, the eight teams finishing the league phase in positions 1–8 were seeded, and the eight winners of the knockout phase play-offs were unseeded. Again, the draw was split into four sections based on the predetermined bracket, with the seeded teams in each section drawn against one of their two possible unseeded opponents. The seeded teams hosted the second leg.

In the quarter-finals and semi-finals, both the exact match pairings and order of legs were predetermined based on the tournament bracket. The teams with the better league phase ranking played the second leg of each round at home if they continued advancing. Should a seeded team have been beaten, the team that eliminated them took over their seeding position. The winner of semi-final 1 was designated as the "home" team for the final (for administrative purposes, as it was played at a neutral venue).

=== Bracket ===
Knockout phase play-offs
21	(France) Monaco	2	2	4
11	(France) Paris Saint-Germain	3	2	5
20	(Turkey) Galatasaray (a.e.t.)	5	2	7
13	(Italy) Juventus	2	3	5
24	(Portugal) Benfica	0	1	1
9	(Spain) Real Madrid	1	2	3
17	(Germany) Borussia Dortmund	2	1	3
15	(Italy) Atalanta	0	4	4
22	(Azerbaijan) Qarabağ	1	2	3
12	(England) Newcastle United	6	3	9
19	(Belgium) Club Brugge	3	1	4
14	(Spain) Atlético Madrid	3	4	7
23	(Norway) Bodø/Glimt	3	2	5
10	(Italy) Inter Milan	1	1	2
18	(Greece) Olympiacos	0	0	0
16	(Germany) Bayer Leverkusen	2	0	2

Round of 16
11	(France) Paris Saint-Germain	5	3	8
6	(England) Chelsea	2	0	2
20	(Turkey) Galatasaray	1	0	1
3	(England) Liverpool	0	4	4
9	(Spain) Real Madrid	3	2	5
8	(England) Manchester City	0	1	1
15	(Italy) Atalanta	1	1	2
2	(Germany) Bayern Munich	6	4	10
12	(England) Newcastle United	1	2	3
5	(Spain) Barcelona	1	7	8
14	(Spain) Atlético Madrid	5	2	7
4	(England) Tottenham Hotspur	2	3	5
23	(Norway) Bodø/Glimt	3	0	3
7	(Portugal) Sporting CP (a.e.t.)	0	5	5
16	(Germany) Bayer Leverkusen	1	0	1
1	(England) Arsenal	1	2	3

Quarter-finals
11	(France) Paris Saint-Germain	2	2	4
3	(England) Liverpool	0	0	0
9	(Spain) Real Madrid	1	3	4
2	(Germany) Bayern Munich	2	4	6
5	(Spain) Barcelona	0	2	2
14	(Spain) Atlético Madrid	2	1	3
7	(Portugal) Sporting CP	0	0	0
1	(England) Arsenal	1	0	1

Semi-finals
11	(France) Paris Saint-Germain	5	1	6
2	(Germany) Bayern Munich	4	1	5
14	(Spain) Atlético Madrid	1	0	1
1	(England) Arsenal	1	1	2

Final
30 May – Budapest
11	(France) Paris Saint-Germain (p)	1 (4)
1	(England) Arsenal	1 (3)

=== Knockout phase play-offs ===
The draw for the knockout phase play-offs was held on 30 January 2026, 12:00 CET. The first legs were played on 17 and 18 February, and the second legs were played on 24 and 25 February 2026.

Team 1	Agg.	Team 2	1st leg	2nd leg
Monaco (France)	4–5	(France) Paris Saint-Germain	2–3	2–2
Galatasaray (Turkey)	7–5	(Italy) Juventus	5–2	2–3 (a.e.t.)
Benfica (Portugal)	1–3	(Spain) Real Madrid	0–1	1–2
Borussia Dortmund (Germany)	3–4	(Italy) Atalanta	2–0	1–4
Qarabağ (Azerbaijan)	3–9	(England) Newcastle United	1–6	2–3
Club Brugge (Belgium)	4–7	(Spain) Atlético Madrid	3–3	1–4
Bodø/Glimt (Norway)	5–2	(Italy) Inter Milan	3–1	2–1
Olympiacos (Greece)	0–2	(Germany) Bayer Leverkusen	0–2	0–0

=== Round of 16 ===
The draw for the round of 16 was held on 27 February 2026, 12:00 CET. The first legs were played on 10 and 11 March, and the second legs were played on 17 and 18 March 2026.

Team 1	Agg.	Team 2	1st leg	2nd leg
Paris Saint-Germain (France)	8–2	(England) Chelsea	5–2	3–0
Galatasaray (Turkey)	1–4	(England) Liverpool	1–0	0–4
Real Madrid (Spain)	5–1	(England) Manchester City	3–0	2–1
Atalanta (Italy)	2–10	(Germany) Bayern Munich	1–6	1–4
Newcastle United (England)	3–8	(Spain) Barcelona	1–1	2–7
Atlético Madrid (Spain)	7–5	(England) Tottenham Hotspur	5–2	2–3
Bodø/Glimt (Norway)	3–5	(Portugal) Sporting CP	3–0	0–5 (a.e.t.)
Bayer Leverkusen (Germany)	1–3	(England) Arsenal	1–1	0–2

=== Quarter-finals ===
The first legs were played on 7 and 8 April, and the second legs were played on 14 and 15 April 2026.

Team 1	Agg.	Team 2	1st leg	2nd leg
Paris Saint-Germain (France)	4–0	(England) Liverpool	2–0	2–0
Real Madrid (Spain)	4–6	(Germany) Bayern Munich	1–2	3–4
Barcelona (Spain)	2–3	(Spain) Atlético Madrid	0–2	2–1
Sporting CP (Portugal)	0–1	(England) Arsenal	0–1	0–0

=== Semi-finals ===
The first legs were played on 28 and 29 April, and the second legs were played on 5 and 6 May 2026.

Team 1	Agg.	Team 2	1st leg	2nd leg
Paris Saint-Germain (France)	6–5	(Germany) Bayern Munich	5–4	1–1
Atlético Madrid (Spain)	1–2	(England) Arsenal	1–1	0–1

=== Final ===
The final was played on 30 May 2026 at the Puskás Aréna in Budapest. The winner of semi-final 1 was designated as the "home" team for administrative purposes.

30 May 2026
18:00 UTC+2

Paris Saint-Germain (French Football Federation)	1–1 (a.e.t.)	(The Football Association) Arsenal
Dembélé 65' (pen.)	Report	Havertz 6'
Penalties
Ramos (penalty scored); Doué (penalty scored); Mendes (penalty missed); Hakimi (penalty scored); Beraldo (penalty scored)	4–3	(penalty scored) Gyökeres; (penalty missed) Eze; (penalty scored) Rice; (penalty scored) Martinelli; (penalty missed) Gabriel

Puskás Aréna, Budapest
Attendance: 61,035
Referee: Daniel Siebert (Germany)

== Statistics ==
Statistics exclude qualifying rounds and play-off round.

=== Top goalscorers ===
Rank	Player	Team	Goals	Minutes played
1	(France) Kylian Mbappé	(Spain) Real Madrid	15	912
2	(England) Harry Kane	(Germany) Bayern Munich	14	1039
3	(England) Anthony Gordon	(England) Newcastle United	10	771
3	(Georgia (country)) Khvicha Kvaratskhelia	(France) Paris Saint-Germain	10	1141
3	(Argentina) Julián Alvarez	(Spain) Atlético Madrid	10	1240
6	(Norway) Erling Haaland	(England) Manchester City	8	756
6	(France) Ousmane Dembélé	(France) Paris Saint-Germain	8	827
8	(Nigeria) Victor Osimhen	(Turkey) Galatasaray	7	841
8	(Colombia) Luis Díaz	(Germany) Bayern Munich	7	980
10	Seven players		6	—N/a

=== Team of the Season ===
The UEFA technical study group selected the following players as the team of the tournament.

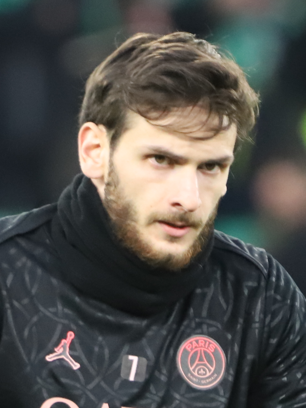
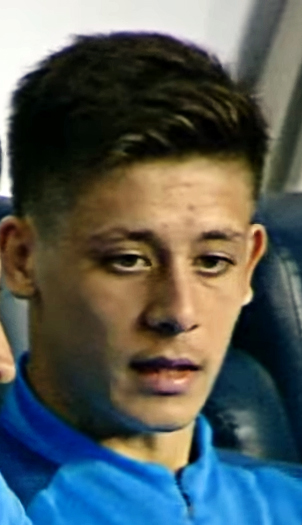
Paris Saint-Germain forward Khvicha Kvaratskhelia (left) was named the Champions League Player of the Season, while Real Madrid midfielder Arda Güler (right) was named the Young Player of the Season.

Pos.	Player	Team
GK	(Spain) David Raya	(England) Arsenal
DF	(Spain) Marcos Llorente	(Spain) Atlético Madrid
DF	(Brazil) Marquinhos	(France) Paris Saint-Germain
DF	(Brazil) Gabriel	(England) Arsenal
DF	(Portugal) Nuno Mendes	(France) Paris Saint-Germain
MF	(France) Michael Olise	(Germany) Bayern Munich
MF	(England) Declan Rice	(England) Arsenal
MF	(Portugal) Vitinha	(France) Paris Saint-Germain
MF	(Georgia (country)) Khvicha Kvaratskhelia	(France) Paris Saint-Germain
FW	(France) Ousmane Dembélé	(France) Paris Saint-Germain
FW	(England) Harry Kane	(Germany) Bayern Munich

=== Player of the Season ===
- (Georgia (country)) Khvicha Kvaratskhelia ( (France) Paris Saint-Germain)

=== Young Player of the Season ===
- (Turkey) Arda Güler ( (Spain) Real Madrid)

== See also ==
- 2025–26 UEFA Europa League
- 2025–26 UEFA Conference League
- 2026 UEFA Super Cup
- 2025–26 UEFA Women's Champions League
- 2025–26 UEFA Women's Europa Cup
- 2025–26 UEFA Youth League
