= 2025–26 UEFA Champions League qualifying =

Football tournament qualification stage

2025–26 UEFA Champions League qualifying was the preliminary phase of the 2025–26 UEFA Champions League, prior to the competition proper. Qualification consisted of the qualifying phase (first to third rounds) and the play-off round. It began on 8 July and ended on 27 August 2025.

A total of 53 teams competed in the qualifying system of the 2025–26 UEFA Champions League, with 42 teams in Champions Path and 11 teams in League Path. The seven winners in the play-off round (five from Champions Path, two from League Path) advanced to the league phase, to join the 29 teams that entered in the league stage.

Times are CEST (UTC+2), as listed by UEFA (local times, if different, are in parentheses).

== Format ==
The qualifying phase and play-off round were split into two paths – the Champions Path and the League Path. The Champions Path contained teams which qualified as the winners of their domestic league, and the League Path contained teams which qualified as runners-up, third-placed or fourth-placed teams from their domestic league.

Each tie was played over two legs, with each team playing one leg at home. The team that scored more goals on aggregate over the two legs advanced to the next round. If the aggregate score was level at the end of normal time of the second leg, extra time was played, and if the same number of goals was scored by both teams during extra time, the tie was determined by a penalty shoot-out.

In the draws for each round, teams were seeded based on their UEFA club coefficients at the beginning of the season, with the teams divided into seeded and unseeded pots containing the same number of teams. A seeded team was drawn against an unseeded team, with the order of legs in each tie decided by draw. As the identity of the winners of the previous round may not have been known at the time of the draws, the seeding was carried out under the assumption that the team with the higher coefficient of an undecided tie advanced to the subsequent round, which meant if the team with the lower coefficient advanced, it simply took the seeding of its opponent. Prior to the draws, UEFA could form "groups" in accordance with the principles set by the Club Competitions Committee purely for the convenience of the draw and not to resemble any real groupings in the sense of the competition. Teams from associations with political conflicts as decided by UEFA could not be drawn into the same tie. After the draws, the order of legs of a tie could be reversed by UEFA due to scheduling or venue conflicts.

== Schedule ==
The schedule of the competition was as follows.

Schedule for 2025–26 UEFA Champions League qualifying phase and play-off round
Round	Draw date	First leg	Second leg
First qualifying round	17 June 2025	8–9 July 2025	15–16 July 2025
Second qualifying round	18 June 2025	22–23 July 2025	29–30 July 2025
Third qualifying round	21 July 2025	5–6 August 2025	12 August 2025
Play-off round	4 August 2025	19–20 August 2025	26–27 August 2025

== Teams ==
The information below reflects Russia's ongoing suspension from UEFA.

=== Champions Path ===
The Champions Path included all league champions which did not qualify directly for the league phase, and consisted of the following rounds:

- First qualifying round (28 teams): 28 teams which entered in this round.
- Second qualifying round (24 teams): 10 teams which entered in this round, and 14 winners of the first qualifying round.
- Third qualifying round (12 teams): 12 winners of the second qualifying round.
- Play-off round (10 teams): 4 teams which entered in this round, and 6 winners of the third qualifying round.

The default access list could be altered based on the qualifying teams' 2025 UEFA club coefficients should the winners of the 2024–25 UEFA Champions League also have qualified for the 2025–26 edition via their domestic league.

All teams eliminated from the Champions Path entered either the Europa League or the Conference League:

- The losers of the first qualifying round entered the Conference League Champions Path second qualifying round unless drawn to receive a bye to the Conference League Champions Path third qualifying round.
- The 12 losers of the second qualifying round entered the Europa League Champions Path third qualifying round
- The 6 losers of the third qualifying round entered the Europa League play-off round.
- The 5 losers of the play-off round entered the Europa League league phase.

Below were the participating teams of the Champions Path (with their 2025 UEFA club coefficients), grouped by their starting rounds.

Key to colours
Winners of play-off round advanced to league phase
Losers of play-off round entered Europa League league phase
Losers of third qualifying round entered Europa League play-off round
Losers of second qualifying round entered Europa League third qualifying round
Losers of the first qualifying round that received a bye entered Conference League third qualifying round
Losers of the first qualifying round entered Conference League second qualifying round

Play-off round
Team	Coeff.
(Norway) Bodø/Glimt	49.000
(Scotland) Celtic	38.000
(Switzerland) Basel	33.000
(Austria) Sturm Graz	23.000

Second qualifying round
Team	Coeff.
(Denmark) Copenhagen	44.875
(Serbia) Red Star Belgrade	44.000
(Hungary) Ferencváros	39.000
(Israel) Maccabi Tel Aviv	37.500
(Slovakia) Slovan Bratislava	33.500
(Azerbaijan) Qarabağ	32.000
(Ukraine) Dynamo Kyiv	23.500
(Poland) Lech Poznań	19.000
(Croatia) Rijeka	12.000
(Cyprus) Pafos	11.125

First qualifying round
Team	Coeff.
(Bulgaria) Ludogorets Razgrad	24.000
(Romania) FCSB	22.500
(Slovenia) Olimpija Ljubljana	17.375
(Sweden) Malmö FF	14.500
(Lithuania) Žalgiris	12.000
(Latvia) RFS	11.000
(Bosnia and Herzegovina) Zrinjski Mostar	10.000
(Gibraltar) Lincoln Red Imps	10.000
(Finland) KuPS	10.000
(Wales) The New Saints	9.000
(Kosovo) Drita	9.000
(Iceland) Breiðablik	9.000
(Northern Ireland) Linfield	8.500
(Montenegro) Budućnost Podgorica	8.000
(Andorra) Inter Club d'Escaldes	7.500
(North Macedonia) Shkëndija	7.500
(Estonia) FCI Levadia	6.500
(Belarus) Dinamo Minsk	6.000
(Malta) Hamrun Spartans	6.000
(Kazakhstan) Kairat	5.500
(Moldova) Milsami Orhei	5.500
(Armenia) Noah	5.000
(Luxembourg) Differdange 03	5.000
(Georgia (country)) Iberia 1999	4.500
(Faroe Islands) Víkingur Gøta	4.000
(Republic of Ireland) Shelbourne	2.993
(Albania) Egnatia	2.500
(San Marino) Virtus	1.500

=== League Path ===
The League Path included all league non-champions which did not qualify directly for the league phase, and consisted of the following rounds:

- Second qualifying round (6 teams): 6 teams which entered in this round.
- Third qualifying round (8 teams): 5 teams which entered in this round, and 3 winners of the second qualifying round.
- Play-off round (4 teams): 4 winners of the third qualifying round.

All teams eliminated from the League Path entered the Europa League:

- The 3 losers of the second qualifying round entered the Main Path third qualifying round.
- The 4 losers of the third qualifying round entered the league phase.
- The 2 losers of the play-off round entered the league phase.

Below were the participating teams of the League Path (with their 2025 UEFA club coefficients), grouped by their starting rounds.

Key to colours
Winners of play-off round advanced to league phase
Losers of play-off round entered Europa League league phase
Losers of third qualifying round entered Europa League league phase
Losers of second qualifying round entered Europa League third qualifying round

Third qualifying round
Team	Coeff.
(Portugal) Benfica	87.750
(Belgium) Club Brugge	71.750
(Netherlands) Feyenoord	71.000
(Turkey) Fenerbahçe	47.250
(France) Nice	20.000

Second qualifying round
Team	Coeff.
(Scotland) Rangers	71.250
(Austria) Red Bull Salzburg	48.000
(Czech Republic) Viktoria Plzeň	39.250
(Greece) Panathinaikos	16.000
(Switzerland) Servette	11.500
(Norway) Brann	7.937

== First qualifying round ==
The draw for the first qualifying round was held on 17 June 2025.

=== Seeding ===
A total of 28 teams played in the first qualifying round. Seeding of the teams was based on their 2025 UEFA club coefficients. Before the draw, UEFA allocated the teams into three groups, two with five seeded and five unseeded teams and one with four seeded and four unseeded team per the principles set by the Club Competitions Committee. The first team drawn in each tie was the home team for the first leg.

Group 1		Group 2		Group 3	
Seeded	Unseeded	Seeded	Unseeded	Seeded	Unseeded
(Sweden) Malmö FF; (Lithuania) Žalgiris; (Latvia) RFS; (Finland) KuPS; (Wales) The New Saints	(North Macedonia) Shkëndija; (Estonia) FCI Levadia; (Malta) Hamrun Spartans; (Moldova) Milsami Orhei; (Georgia (country)) Iberia 1999	(Romania) FCSB; (Gibraltar) Lincoln Red Imps; (Kosovo) Drita; (Iceland) Breiðablik; (Northern Ireland) Linfield	(Andorra) Inter Club d'Escaldes; (Luxembourg) Differdange 03; (Faroe Islands) Víkingur Gøta; (Republic of Ireland) Shelbourne; (Albania) Egnatia	(Bulgaria) Ludogorets Razgrad; (Slovenia) Olimpija Ljubljana; (Bosnia and Herzegovina) Zrinjski Mostar; (Montenegro) Budućnost Podgorica	(Belarus) Dinamo Minsk; (Kazakhstan) Kairat; (Armenia) Noah; (San Marino) Virtus

=== Summary ===
The first legs were played on 8 and 9 July, and the second legs were played on 15 and 16 July 2025.

The winners of the ties advanced to the Champions Path second qualifying round. Twelve of the losing teams were transferred to the Conference League Champions Path second qualifying round, and the other two losing teams (selected via a draw) were transferred to the Conference League Champions Path third qualifying round.

First qualifying round
Team 1	Agg.	Team 2	1st leg	2nd leg
Žalgiris (Lithuania)	2–2 (10–11 p)	(Malta) Hamrun Spartans	2–0	0–2 (a.e.t.)
KuPS (Finland)	1–0	(Moldova) Milsami Orhei	1–0	0–0
The New Saints (Wales)	1–2	(North Macedonia) Shkëndija	0–0	1–2 (a.e.t.)
Iberia 1999 (Georgia (country))	2–6	(Sweden) Malmö FF	1–3	1–3
FCI Levadia (Estonia)	0–2	(Latvia) RFS	0–1	0–1
Drita (Kosovo)	4–2	(Luxembourg) Differdange 03	1–0	3–2
Víkingur Gøta (Faroe Islands)	2–4	(Gibraltar) Lincoln Red Imps	2–3	0–1
Egnatia (Albania)	1–5	(Iceland) Breiðablik	1–0	0–5
Shelbourne (Republic of Ireland)	2–1	(Northern Ireland) Linfield	1–0	1–1
FCSB (Romania)	4–3	(Andorra) Inter Club d'Escaldes	3–1	1–2
Virtus (San Marino)	1–4	(Bosnia and Herzegovina) Zrinjski Mostar	0–2	1–2
Olimpija Ljubljana (Slovenia)	1–3	(Kazakhstan) Kairat	1–1	0–2
Noah (Armenia)	3–2	(Montenegro) Budućnost Podgorica	1–0	2–2
Ludogorets Razgrad (Bulgaria)	3–2	(Belarus) Dinamo Minsk	1–0	2–2 (a.e.t.)

=== Matches ===
9 July 2025
18:00 (19:00 UTC+3)

Žalgiris (Lithuania)	2–0	(Malta) Hamrun Spartans
Antal 59'; Hadji 85'	Report

LFF Stadium, Vilnius
Attendance: 3,176
Referee: Sandi Putros (Denmark)
15 July 2025
19:00

Hamrun Spartans (Malta)	2–0 (a.e.t.)	(Lithuania) Žalgiris
Thioune 35'; Mbong 41'	Report
Penalties
Emerson (penalty scored); Čađenović (penalty missed); El Fanis (penalty scored); Polito (penalty scored); Jonny (penalty scored); Thioune (penalty missed); Micallef (penalty scored); Camenzuli (penalty scored); Bjeličić (penalty scored); Bonello (penalty scored); Emerson (penalty scored); Jonny (penalty missed); Polito (penalty scored); Čađenović (penalty scored)	11–10	(penalty scored) Antal; (penalty missed) Salčinović; (penalty scored) Moutachy; (penalty scored) Ofori; (penalty scored) Mihajlović; (penalty missed) Dumančić; (penalty scored) Youla; (penalty scored) Devens; (penalty scored) Lukaševič; (penalty scored) Olses; (penalty scored) Antal; (penalty missed) Salčinović; (penalty scored) Moutachy; (penalty missed) Ofori

Centenary Stadium, Ta' Qali (Note: Hamrun Spartans played their Champions League first qualifying round home match at the Centenary Stadium, in Ta' Qali, instead of their regular venue, the Victor Tedesco Stadium, in Hamrun, which did not meet UEFA requirements.)
Attendance: 1,247
Referee: Matteo Mercenaro (Italy)

2–2 on aggregate; Hamrun Spartans won 11–10 on penalties.

8 July 2025
17:00 (18:00 UTC+3)

KuPS (Finland)	1–0	(Moldova) Milsami Orhei
Ruoppi 73'	Report

Kuopio Football Stadium, Kuopio
Attendance: 2,316
Referee: Vitālijs Spasjoņņikovs (Latvia)
15 July 2025
19:00 (20:00 UTC+3)

Milsami Orhei (Moldova)	0–0	(Finland) KuPS
	Report

CSR Orhei, Orhei
Attendance: 3,105
Referee: Mihály Káprály (Hungary)

KuPS won 1–0 on aggregate.

8 July 2025
20:00 (19:00 UTC+1)

The New Saints (Wales)	0–0	(North Macedonia) Shkëndija
	Report

Park Hall, Oswestry
Attendance: 1,090
Referee: Rob Hennessy (Republic of Ireland)
15 July 2025
20:00

Shkëndija (North Macedonia)	2–1 (a.e.t.)	(Wales) The New Saints
Tamba 18'; Bodenham 116' (o.g.)	Report	J. Williams 38'

Toše Proeski Arena, Skopje (Note: Shkëndija played their home matches at the Toše Proeski Arena in Skopje, instead of their regular stadium, the Ecolog Arena, in Tetovo, due to renovation works.)
Attendance: 2,589
Referee: Sayat Karabayev (Kazakhstan)

Shkëndija won 2–1 on aggregate.

8 July 2025
18:00 (20:00 UTC+4)

Iberia 1999 (Georgia (country))	1–3	(Sweden) Malmö FF
Rušević 86'	Report	Busanello 8'; Bolin 58'; Ali 70'

Mikheil Meskhi Stadium, Tbilisi
Attendance: 7,449
Referee: Igor Stojchevski (North Macedonia)
15 July 2025
19:00

Malmö FF (Sweden)	3–1	(Georgia (country)) Iberia 1999
Ali 55', 89'; Jansson 60'	Report	Dzagania 90+3'

Stadion, Malmö
Attendance: 13,819
Referee: Romain Lissorgue (France)

Malmö FF won 6–2 on aggregate.

8 July 2025
18:30 (19:30 UTC+3)

FCI Levadia (Estonia)	0–1	(Latvia) RFS
	Report	Panić 56' (pen.)

Lilleküla Stadium, Tallinn
Attendance: 2,895
Referee: Tom Owen (Wales)
15 July 2025
19:00 (20:00 UTC+3)

RFS (Latvia)	1–0	(Estonia) FCI Levadia
Panić 68'	Report

LNK Sporta Parks, Riga
Attendance: 1,700
Referee: Andrei Chivulete (Romania)

RFS won 2–0 on aggregate.

8 July 2025
20:00

Drita (Kosovo)	1–0	(Luxembourg) Differdange 03
Manaj 74'	Report

Fadil Vokrri Stadium, Pristina (Note: Drita played their home matches at the Fadil Vokrri Stadium in Pristina, instead of their regular stadium, the Gjilan City Stadium, in Gjilan, due to renovation works.)
Attendance: 4,156
Referee: Zorbay Küçük (Turkey)
15 July 2025
20:00

Differdange 03 (Luxembourg)	2–3	(Kosovo) Drita
Brusco 28'; Hadji 90' (pen.)	Report	Manaj 4', 17'; Tusha 90+3'

Stade Municipal de la Ville de Differdange, Differdange
Attendance: 1,922
Referee: Viktor Kopiievskyi (Ukraine)

Drita won 4–2 on aggregate.

8 July 2025
20:00 (19:00 UTC+1)

Víkingur Gøta (Faroe Islands)	2–3	(Gibraltar) Lincoln Red Imps
Johansen 28'; Vatnhamar 45+4' (pen.)	Report	Lopes 19', 31'; De Barr 38' (pen.)

Við Djúpumýrar, Klaksvík (Note: Víkingur Gøta played their home match at Við Djúpumýrar in Klaksvík, instead of their regular stadium, Sarpugerði, in Norðragøta, which did not meet UEFA requirements.)
Attendance: 740
Referee: Lothar D'hondt (Belgium)
15 July 2025
17:30

Lincoln Red Imps (Gibraltar)	1–0	(Faroe Islands) Víkingur Gøta
De Barr 90+6'	Report

Europa Sports Park, Gibraltar (Note: Lincoln Red Imps played their home matches at Europa Sports Park, instead of the Victoria Stadium, due to renovation works.)
Attendance: 758
Referee: Ben Mcmaster (Northern Ireland)

Lincoln Red Imps won 4–2 on aggregate.

8 July 2025
21:00

Egnatia (Albania)	1–0	(Iceland) Breiðablik
Gruda 90+2'	Report

Egnatia Arena, Rrogozhinë
Attendance: 3,563
Referee: Antoni Bandić (Bosnia and Herzegovina)
15 July 2025
21:00 (19:00 UTC+0)

Breiðablik (Iceland)	5–0	(Albania) Egnatia
Þorsteinsson 16', 27'; V. Einarsson 23', 38'; Ómarsson 69'	Report

Kópavogsvöllur, Kópavogur
Attendance: 1,150
Referee: David Dickinson (Scotland)

Breiðablik won 5–1 on aggregate.

9 July 2025
20:45 (19:45 UTC+1)

Shelbourne (Republic of Ireland)	1–0	(Northern Ireland) Linfield
Odubeko 58'	Report

Tolka Park, Dublin
Attendance: 3,655
Referee: Luis Godinho (Portugal)
16 July 2025
20:45 (19:45 UTC+1)

Linfield (Northern Ireland)	1–1	(Republic of Ireland) Shelbourne
Shields 45+3' (pen.)	Report	Coote 25'

Windsor Park, Belfast
Attendance: 7,137
Referee: Andrew Madley (England)

Shelbourne won 2–1 on aggregate.

9 July 2025
19:30 (20:30 UTC+3)

FCSB (Romania)	3–1	(Andorra) Inter Club d'Escaldes
Miculescu 37'; Olaru 45+3' (pen.); Ștefănescu 53'	Report	Rafinha 65'

Steaua Stadium, Bucharest (Note: FCSB played their home match at the Steaua Stadium, instead of their regular stadium, the Arena Națională, as it was being used for the Neversea Kapital music festival.)
Attendance: 13,080
Referee: Danilo Nikolić (Serbia)
15 July 2025
20:30

Inter Club d'Escaldes (Andorra)	2–1	(Romania) FCSB
Andreu 67'; Llovet 88'	Report	Radunović 51'

Estadi de la FAF, Encamp
Attendance: 509
Referee: Ishmael Barbara (Malta)

FCSB won 4–3 on aggregate.

8 July 2025
21:00

Virtus (San Marino)	0–2	(Bosnia and Herzegovina) Zrinjski Mostar
	Report	Bilbija 45' (pen.), 79'

San Marino Stadium, Serravalle
Attendance: 864
Referee: Roman Jitari (Moldova)
15 July 2025
21:00

Zrinjski Mostar (Bosnia and Herzegovina)	2–1	(San Marino) Virtus
Mamić 40'; Bilbija 75'	Report	Scappini 90+2' (pen.)

Stadion pod Bijelim Brijegom, Mostar
Attendance: 4,600
Referee: Visar Kastrati (Kosovo)

Zrinjski Mostar won 4–1 on aggregate.

8 July 2025
19:00

Olimpija Ljubljana (Slovenia)	1–1	(Kazakhstan) Kairat
Pinto 66'	Report	Satpayev 59'

Stožice Stadium, Ljubljana
Attendance: 4,877
Referee: Christos Vergetis (Greece)
15 July 2025
17:00 (20:00 UTC+5)

Kairat (Kazakhstan)	2–0	(Slovenia) Olimpija Ljubljana
Jorginho 5'; Mrynskiy 31'	Report

Central Stadium, Almaty
Attendance: 22,800
Referee: Matteo Marchetti (Italy)

Kairat won 3–1 on aggregate.

8 July 2025
18:00 (20:00 UTC+4)

Noah (Armenia)	1–0	(Montenegro) Budućnost Podgorica
Oulad Omar 68'	Report

Abovyan City Stadium, Abovyan
Attendance: 2,905
Referee: Volen Chinkov (Bulgaria)
15 July 2025
21:00

Budućnost Podgorica (Montenegro)	2–2	(Armenia) Noah
Ivanović 68'; Grbić 90+1'	Report	Oulad Omar 6'; Grgić 29'

Podgorica City Stadium, Podgorica
Attendance: 6,150
Referee: Matthias Jöllenbeck (Germany)

Noah won 3–2 on aggregate.

9 July 2025
19:30 (20:30 UTC+3)

Ludogorets Razgrad (Bulgaria)	1–0	(Belarus) Dinamo Minsk
Kaloč 87'	Report

Huvepharma Arena, Razgrad
Attendance: 4,522
Referee: Christian-Petru Ciochirca (Austria)
16 July 2025
20:45

Dinamo Minsk (Belarus)	2–2 (a.e.t.)	(Bulgaria) Ludogorets Razgrad
Djimet 54'; Pedro Igor 62'	Report	Marcus 41'; Bile 100'

Mezőkövesdi Városi Stadion, Mezőkövesd, Hungary (Note: Due to the country's involvement in the Russian invasion of Ukraine, Belarusian teams were required to play their home matches at neutral venues and behind closed doors until further notice.)
Attendance: 0
Referee: Goga Kikacheishvili (Georgia)

Ludogorets Razgrad won 3–2 on aggregate.

== Second qualifying round ==
The draw for the second qualifying round was held on 18 June 2025.

=== Seeding ===
A total of 30 teams played in the second qualifying round. Seeding of the teams was based on their 2025 UEFA club coefficients. Before the draw, UEFA allocated the teams into three groups of four seeded teams and four unseeded teams in accordance with the principles set by the Club Competitions Committee. The first team drawn in each tie was the home team for the first leg.

Champions Path
Group 1		Group 2		Group 3	
Seeded	Unseeded	Seeded	Unseeded	Seeded	Unseeded
(Serbia) Red Star Belgrade; (Israel) Maccabi Tel Aviv; (Ukraine) Dynamo Kyiv; (Sweden) Malmö FF	(Malta) Hamrun Spartans; (Cyprus) Pafos; (Latvia) RFS; (Gibraltar) Lincoln Red Imps	(Denmark) Copenhagen; (Hungary) Ferencváros; (Bulgaria) Ludogorets Razgrad; (Poland) Lech Poznań	(Croatia) Rijeka; (Kosovo) Drita; (Iceland) Breiðablik; (Armenia) Noah	(Slovakia) Slovan Bratislava; (Azerbaijan) Qarabağ; (Romania) FCSB; (Kazakhstan) Kairat	(Bosnia and Herzegovina) Zrinjski Mostar; (Finland) KuPS; (North Macedonia) Shkëndija; (Republic of Ireland) Shelbourne

League Path
Seeded	Unseeded
(Scotland) Rangers: (Austria) Red Bull Salzburg; (Czech Republic) Viktoria Plzeň	(Greece) Panathinaikos; (Switzerland) Servette; (Norway) Brann

Notes

1. ^{†} Winners of the first qualifying round, whose identity was not known at the time of draw. Teams in italics defeated a team with a higher coefficient, thus effectively taking the coefficient of their opponent in the draw.

=== Summary ===
The first legs were played on 22 and 23 July, and the second legs were played on 29 and 30 July 2025.

The winners of the ties advanced to the third qualifying round. The losers were transferred to the Europa League third qualifying round.

Second qualifying round
Team 1	Agg.	Team 2	1st leg	2nd leg
Champions Path
RFS (Latvia)	1–5	(Sweden) Malmö FF	1–4	0–1
Hamrun Spartans (Malta)	0–6	(Ukraine) Dynamo Kyiv	0–3	0–3
Pafos (Cyprus)	2–1	(Israel) Maccabi Tel Aviv	1–1	1–0
Lincoln Red Imps (Gibraltar)	1–6	(Serbia) Red Star Belgrade	0–1	1–5
Noah (Armenia)	4–6	(Hungary) Ferencváros	1–2	3–4
Lech Poznań (Poland)	8–1	(Iceland) Breiðablik	7–1	1–0
Copenhagen (Denmark)	3–0	(Kosovo) Drita	2–0	1–0
Rijeka (Croatia)	1–3	(Bulgaria) Ludogorets Razgrad	0–0	1–3 (a.e.t.)
Shkëndija (North Macedonia)	3–1	(Romania) FCSB	1–0	2–1
Slovan Bratislava (Slovakia)	6–2	(Bosnia and Herzegovina) Zrinjski Mostar	4–0	2–2
Shelbourne (Republic of Ireland)	0–4	(Azerbaijan) Qarabağ	0–3	0–1
KuPS (Finland)	2–3	(Kazakhstan) Kairat	2–0	0–3
League Path
Brann (Norway)	2–5	(Austria) Red Bull Salzburg	1–4	1–1
Viktoria Plzeň (Czech Republic)	3–2	(Switzerland) Servette	0–1	3–1
Rangers (Scotland)	3–1	(Greece) Panathinaikos	2–0	1–1

=== Champions Path matches ===
22 July 2025
19:00 (20:00 UTC+3)

RFS (Latvia)	1–4	(Sweden) Malmö FF
Lemajić 40'	Report	Rosengren 13'; Jansson 35'; Hakšabanović 58'; Johnsen 88' (pen.)

LNK Sporta Parks, Riga
Attendance: 1,674
Referee: Miloš Milanović (Serbia)
30 July 2025
19:00

Malmö FF (Sweden)	1–0	(Latvia) RFS
Hakšabanović 25'	Report

Stadion, Malmö
Attendance: 14,225
Referee: Joey Kooij (Netherlands)

Malmö FF won 5–1 on aggregate.

22 July 2025
19:00

Hamrun Spartans (Malta)	0–3	(Ukraine) Dynamo Kyiv
	Report	Vanat 13'; Buyalskyi 76'; Voloshyn 90+2'

Tony Bezzina Stadium, Paola (Note: Hamrun Spartans played their Champions League second qualifying round home match at the Tony Bezzina Stadium, in Paola, instead of their regular venue, the Victor Tedesco Stadium, in Hamrun, which did not meet UEFA requirements.)
Attendance: 1,760
Referee: César Soto Grado (Spain)
29 July 2025
20:00

Dynamo Kyiv (Ukraine)	3–0	(Malta) Hamrun Spartans
Vanat 28'; Brazhko 35'; Mykhavko 82'	Report

Arena Lublin, Lublin, Poland (Note: Due to the Russian invasion of Ukraine, Ukrainian teams were required to play their home matches at neutral venues until further notice.)
Attendance: 2,035
Referee: Jakob Alexander Sundberg (Denmark)

Dynamo Kyiv won 6–0 on aggregate.

22 July 2025
19:00 (20:00 UTC+3)

Pafos (Cyprus)	1–1	(Israel) Maccabi Tel Aviv
Bassouamina 81'	Report	Madmon 90+10'

Alphamega Stadium, Limassol (Note: Pafos played their home matches at the Alphamega Stadium in Limassol, instead of their regular stadium, the Stelios Kyriakides Stadium, in Paphos, which did not meet UEFA requirements.)
Attendance: 4,557
Referee: Mykola Balakin (Ukraine)
30 July 2025
20:00

Maccabi Tel Aviv (Israel)	0–1	(Cyprus) Pafos
	Report	Jajá 40'

TSC Arena, Bačka Topola, Serbia (Note: Due to the Gaza war, Israeli teams were required to play their home matches at neutral venues until further notice.)
Attendance: 421
Referee: Radu Petrescu (Romania)

Pafos won 2–1 on aggregate.

22 July 2025
18:00

Lincoln Red Imps (Gibraltar)	0–1	(Serbia) Red Star Belgrade
	Report	Bruno Duarte 30'

Europa Sports Park, Gibraltar
Attendance: 622
Referee: Damian Kos (Poland)
29 July 2025
21:00

Red Star Belgrade (Serbia)	5–1	(Gibraltar) Lincoln Red Imps
Katai 8'; Ivanić 16'; Bruno Duarte 37'; Milson 44'; Ndiaye 75'	Report	De Barr 53'

Red Star Stadium, Belgrade
Attendance: 31,241
Referee: António Nobre (Portugal)

Red Star Belgrade won 6–1 on aggregate.

22 July 2025
18:00 (20:00 UTC+4)

Noah (Armenia)	1–2	(Hungary) Ferencváros
Gartenmann 35' (o.g.)	Report	O'Dowda 44'; Varga 49'

Abovyan City Stadium, Abovyan
Attendance: 2,800
Referee: Ricardo de Burgos Bengoetxea (Spain)
30 July 2025
20:00

Ferencváros (Hungary)	4–3	(Armenia) Noah
Pešić 1'; Joseph 12'; Zachariassen 52' (pen.); Varga 74'	Report	Ferreira 7'; Aiás 22'; Grgić 71'

Ferencváros Stadion, Budapest
Attendance: 17,039
Referee: Robert Jones (England)

Ferencváros won 6–4 on aggregate.

22 July 2025
20:30

Lech Poznań (Poland)	7–1	(Iceland) Breiðablik
Milić 4'; Ishak 37' (pen.), 45+3' (pen.), 85' (pen.); Pereira 42'; Bengtsson 45+6'; Jagiełło 77'	Report	Gunnlaugsson 28' (pen.)

Poznań Stadium, Poznań
Attendance: 24,859
Referee: Jasper Vergoote (Belgium)
30 July 2025
20:30 (18:30 UTC+0)

Breiðablik (Iceland)	0–1	(Poland) Lech Poznań
	Report	Ishak 29'

Kópavogsvöllur, Kópavogur
Attendance: 1,471
Referee: Adam Ladebäck (Sweden)

Lech Poznań won 8–1 on aggregate.

22 July 2025
19:00

Copenhagen (Denmark)	2–0	(Kosovo) Drita
Mattsson 69' (pen.), 76' (pen.)	Report

Parken Stadium, Copenhagen
Attendance: 17,897
Referee: Martin Matoša (Slovenia)
29 July 2025
20:00

Drita (Kosovo)	0–1	(Denmark) Copenhagen
	Report	Cornelius 42'

Fadil Vokrri Stadium, Pristina
Attendance: 7,255
Referee: Miguel Nogueira (Portugal)

Copenhagen won 3–0 on aggregate.

22 July 2025
20:45

Rijeka (Croatia)	0–0	(Bulgaria) Ludogorets Razgrad
	Report

Stadion Rujevica, Rijeka
Attendance: 7,731
Referee: Elchin Masiyev (Azerbaijan)
30 July 2025
19:30 (20:30 UTC+3)

Ludogorets Razgrad (Bulgaria)	3–1 (a.e.t.)	(Croatia) Rijeka
Piotrowski 19' (pen.); Chochev 107'; Ivanov 117'	Report	Gojak 71'

Huvepharma Arena, Razgrad
Attendance: 6,382
Referee: John Beaton (Scotland)

Ludogorets Razgrad won 3–1 on aggregate.

22 July 2025
20:00

Shkëndija (North Macedonia)	1–0	(Romania) FCSB
Alhassan 65'	Report

Toše Proeski Arena, Skopje
Attendance: 4,438
Referee: Nathan Verboomen (Belgium)
30 July 2025
19:30 (20:30 UTC+3)

FCSB (Romania)	1–2	(North Macedonia) Shkëndija
Cisotti 28'	Report	Latifi 33'; Krstevski 87'

Arena Națională, Bucharest
Attendance: 32,457
Referee: Oleksii Derevinskyi (Ukraine)

Shkëndija won 3–1 on aggregate.

22 July 2025
20:15

Slovan Bratislava (Slovakia)	4–0	(Bosnia and Herzegovina) Zrinjski Mostar
Barseghyan 40'; Strelec 42'; Tolić 62'; Kukharevych 90+3'	Report

Tehelné pole, Bratislava
Attendance: 18,257
Referee: Jérémie Pignard (France)
29 July 2025
21:00

Zrinjski Mostar (Bosnia and Herzegovina)	2–2	(Slovakia) Slovan Bratislava
Bilbija 72' (pen.); Pranjić 76'	Report	Strelec 80', 87'

Stadion pod Bijelim Brijegom, Mostar
Attendance: 4,100
Referee: Arda Kardeşler (Turkey)

Slovan Bratislava won 6–2 on aggregate.

23 July 2025
20:45 (19:45 UTC+1)

Shelbourne (Republic of Ireland)	0–3	(Azerbaijan) Qarabağ
	Report	Andrade 12'; Kashchuk 81'; Akhundzade 85'

Tolka Park, Dublin
Attendance: 3,650
Referee: Ante Čulina (Croatia)
30 July 2025
18:00 (20:00 UTC+4)

Qarabağ (Azerbaijan)	1–0	(Republic of Ireland) Shelbourne
Martin 44' (o.g.)	Report

Tofiq Bahramov Republican Stadium, Baku
Attendance: 25,573
Referee: Andrea Colombo (Italy)

Qarabağ won 4–0 on aggregate.

22 July 2025
17:00 (18:00 UTC+3)

KuPS (Finland)	2–0	(Kazakhstan) Kairat
Toure 49'; Oksanen 71'	Report

Kuopio Football Stadium, Kuopio
Attendance: 2,912
Referee: Alejandro Muñiz Ruiz (Spain)
29 July 2025
17:00 (20:00 UTC+5)

Kairat (Kazakhstan)	3–0	(Finland) KuPS
Satpayev 9'; Jorginho 29'; Gromyko 43'	Report

Central Stadium, Almaty
Attendance: 22,800
Referee: Radoslav Gidzhenov (Bulgaria)

Kairat won 3–2 on aggregate.

=== League Path matches ===
23 July 2025
19:00

Brann (Norway)	1–4	(Austria) Red Bull Salzburg
Magnússon 20'	Report	Nene 58'; Onisiwo 61'; Vertessen 87'; Kjærgaard 90+2' (pen.)

Brann Stadion, Bergen
Attendance: 14,587
Referee: Damian Sylwestrzak (Poland)
30 July 2025
20:45

Red Bull Salzburg (Austria)	1–1	(Norway) Brann
Kjærgaard 6'	Report	Kornvig 3'

Red Bull Arena, Salzburg
Attendance: 11,949
Referee: Rade Obrenović (Slovenia)

Red Bull Salzburg won 5–2 on aggregate.

22 July 2025
19:00

Viktoria Plzeň (Czech Republic)	0–1	(Switzerland) Servette
	Report	Mráz 13'

Doosan Arena, Plzeň
Attendance: 11,055
Referee: Nikola Dabanović (Montenegro)
30 July 2025
21:00

Servette (Switzerland)	1–3	(Czech Republic) Viktoria Plzeň
Antunes 4'	Report	Spáčil 28'; Vydra 31'; Durosinmi 87' (pen.)

Stade de Genève, Geneva
Attendance: 11,716
Referee: Alejandro Muñiz Ruiz (Spain)

Viktoria Plzeň won 3–2 on aggregate.

22 July 2025
20:45 (19:45 UTC+1)

Rangers (Scotland)	2–0	(Greece) Panathinaikos
Curtis 52'; Gassama 78'	Report

Ibrox Stadium, Glasgow
Attendance: 49,548
Referee: Donatas Rumšas (Lithuania)
30 July 2025
20:00 (21:00 UTC+3)

Panathinaikos (Greece)	1–1	(Scotland) Rangers
Đuričić 54'	Report	Gassama 60'

Olympic Stadium, Athens
Attendance: 36,121
Referee: Simone Sozza (Italy)

Rangers won 3–1 on aggregate.

== Third qualifying round ==
The draw for the third qualifying round was held on 21 July 2025.

=== Seeding ===
A total of 20 teams played in the third qualifying round – 12 in the Champions Path and 8 in the League Path. Seeding of the teams was based on their 2025 UEFA club coefficients. Prior to the draw, UEFA formed groups of seeded and unseeded teams per the principles set by the Club Competitions Committee. The first team drawn in each tie was the home team for the first leg.

Champions Path
Group 1		Group 2	
Seeded	Unseeded	Seeded	Unseeded
(Denmark) Copenhagen; (Serbia) Red Star Belgrade; (Slovakia) Slovan Bratislava	(Poland) Lech Poznań; (Sweden) Malmö FF; (Kazakhstan) Kairat	(Hungary) Ferencváros; (Cyprus) Pafos; (Azerbaijan) Qarabağ	(Bulgaria) Ludogorets Razgrad; (Ukraine) Dynamo Kyiv; (North Macedonia) Shkëndija

League Path
Seeded	Unseeded
(Portugal) Benfica; (Belgium) Club Brugge; (Scotland) Rangers; (Netherlands) Feyenoord	(Austria) Red Bull Salzburg; (Turkey) Fenerbahçe; (Czech Republic) Viktoria Plzeň; (France) Nice

Notes

1. ^{†} Winners of the second qualifying round, whose identity was not known at the time of draw. Teams in italics defeated a team with a higher coefficient, thus effectively taking the coefficient of their opponent in the draw.

=== Summary ===
The first legs were played on 5 and 6 August, and the second legs were played on 12 August 2025.

The winners of the ties advanced to the play-off round. The losers of the Champions Path were transferred to the Europa League play-off round. The losers of the League Path were transferred to the Europa League league phase.

Third qualifying round
Team 1	Agg.	Team 2	1st leg	2nd leg
Champions Path
Malmö FF (Sweden)	0–5	(Denmark) Copenhagen	0–0	0–5
Kairat (Kazakhstan)	1–1 (4–3 p)	(Slovakia) Slovan Bratislava	1–0	0–1 (a.e.t.)
Lech Poznań (Poland)	2–4	(Serbia) Red Star Belgrade	1–3	1–1
Ludogorets Razgrad (Bulgaria)	0–3	(Hungary) Ferencváros	0–0	0–3
Dynamo Kyiv (Ukraine)	0–3	(Cyprus) Pafos	0–1	0–2
Shkëndija (North Macedonia)	1–6	(Azerbaijan) Qarabağ	0–1	1–5
League Path
Red Bull Salzburg (Austria)	2–4	(Belgium) Club Brugge	0–1	2–3
Rangers (Scotland)	4–2	(Czech Republic) Viktoria Plzeň	3–0	1–2
Nice (France)	0–4	(Portugal) Benfica	0–2	0–2
Feyenoord (Netherlands)	4–6	(Turkey) Fenerbahçe	2–1	2–5

=== Champions Path matches ===
5 August 2025
19:00

Malmö FF (Sweden)	0–0	(Denmark) Copenhagen
	Report

Stadion, Malmö
Attendance: 20,175
Referee: João Pinheiro (Portugal)
12 August 2025
19:00

Copenhagen (Denmark)	5–0	(Sweden) Malmö FF
Huescas 31'; Robert 43', 69'; Elyounoussi 51'; Mattsson 67'	Report

Parken Stadium, Copenhagen
Attendance: 34,233
Referee: José María Sánchez Martínez (Spain)

Copenhagen won 5–0 on aggregate.

6 August 2025
17:00 (20:00 UTC+5)

Kairat (Kazakhstan)	1–0	(Slovakia) Slovan Bratislava
Satpayev 90' (pen.)	Report

Central Stadium, Almaty
Attendance: 22,800
Referee: Serdar Gözübüyük (Netherlands)
12 August 2025
20:15

Slovan Bratislava (Slovakia)	1–0 (a.e.t.)	(Kazakhstan) Kairat
Mak 30'	Report
Penalties
Tolić (penalty scored); Pokorný (penalty scored); Kukharevych (penalty scored); Mustafić (penalty missed); Barseghyan (penalty missed)	3–4	(penalty missed) Gromyko; (penalty scored) Martynovich; (penalty scored) Ricardinho; (penalty scored) Sorokin; (penalty scored) Jorginho

Tehelné pole, Bratislava
Attendance: 21,005
Referee: Benoît Bastien (France)

1–1 on aggregate; Kairat won 4–3 on penalties.

6 August 2025
20:30

Lech Poznań (Poland)	1–3	(Serbia) Red Star Belgrade
Ishak 34'	Report	Krunić 9', 51'; Bruno Duarte 73'

Poznań Stadium, Poznań
Attendance: 39,743
Referee: Tobias Stieler (Germany)
12 August 2025
21:00

Red Star Belgrade (Serbia)	1–1	(Poland) Lech Poznań
Ndiaye 45+1' (pen.)	Report	Ishak 90+3'

Red Star Stadium, Belgrade
Attendance: 45,371
Referee: François Letexier (France)

Red Star Belgrade won 4–2 on aggregate.

6 August 2025
19:30 (20:30 UTC+3)

Ludogorets Razgrad (Bulgaria)	0–0	(Hungary) Ferencváros
	Report

Huvepharma Arena, Razgrad
Attendance: 6,746
Referee: Espen Eskås (Norway)
12 August 2025
20:15

Ferencváros (Hungary)	3–0	(Bulgaria) Ludogorets Razgrad
Varga 38', 79'; Szalai 86'	Report

Ferencváros Stadion, Budapest
Attendance: 19,111
Referee: Alejandro Hernández Hernández (Spain)

Ferencváros won 3–0 on aggregate.

5 August 2025
20:00

Dynamo Kyiv (Ukraine)	0–1	(Cyprus) Pafos
	Report	Anderson 84'

Arena Lublin, Lublin, Poland
Attendance: 2,020
Referee: Sandro Schärer (Switzerland)
12 August 2025
19:00 (20:00 UTC+3)

Pafos (Cyprus)	2–0	(Ukraine) Dynamo Kyiv
Oršić 2'; Correia 55'	Report

Alphamega Stadium, Limassol
Attendance: 7,601
Referee: Davide Massa (Italy)

Pafos won 3–0 on aggregate.

5 August 2025
20:00

Shkëndija (North Macedonia)	0–1	(Azerbaijan) Qarabağ
	Report	Bayramov 18' (pen.)

Toše Proeski Arena, Skopje
Attendance: 15,930
Referee: Ivan Kružliak (Slovakia)
12 August 2025
18:00 (20:00 UTC+4)

Qarabağ (Azerbaijan)	5–1	(North Macedonia) Shkëndija
Cake 16' (o.g.); Kady 18'; Akhundzade 33'; Janković 35' (pen.); Andrade 59'	Report	Tamba 10'

Tofiq Bahramov Republican Stadium, Baku
Attendance: 30,252
Referee: Danny Makkelie (Netherlands)

Qarabağ won 6–1 on aggregate.

=== League Path matches ===
6 August 2025
19:00

Red Bull Salzburg (Austria)	0–1	(Belgium) Club Brugge
	Report	Vermant 75'

Red Bull Arena, Salzburg
Attendance: 12,782
Referee: Srđan Jovanović (Serbia)
12 August 2025
19:30

Club Brugge (Belgium)	3–2	(Austria) Red Bull Salzburg
Seys 61'; Forbs 83'; Vanaken 90+4'	Report	Rasmussen 18'; Baidoo 43'

Jan Breydel Stadium, Bruges
Attendance: 23,736
Referee: Irfan Peljto (Bosnia and Herzegovina)

Club Brugge won 4–2 on aggregate.

5 August 2025
20:45 (19:45 UTC+1)

Rangers (Scotland)	3–0	(Czech Republic) Viktoria Plzeň
Gassama 15', 51'; Dessers 45' (pen.)	Report

Ibrox Stadium, Glasgow
Attendance: 45,730
Referee: Clément Turpin (France)
12 August 2025
19:00

Viktoria Plzeň (Czech Republic)	2–1	(Scotland) Rangers
Durosinmi 41'; Marković 83'	Report	Cameron 61'

Doosan Arena, Plzeň
Attendance: 11,341
Referee: Szymon Marciniak (Poland)

Rangers won 4–2 on aggregate.

6 August 2025
21:00

Nice (France)	0–2	(Portugal) Benfica
	Report	Ivanović 53'; Florentino 88'

Allianz Riviera, Nice
Attendance: 26,443
Referee: Michael Oliver (England)
12 August 2025
21:00 (20:00 UTC+1)

Benfica (Portugal)	2–0	(France) Nice
Aursnes 19'; Schjelderup 27'	Report

Estádio da Luz, Lisbon
Attendance: 64,511
Referee: Marco Guida (Italy)

Benfica won 4–0 on aggregate.

6 August 2025
21:00

Feyenoord (Netherlands)	2–1	(Turkey) Fenerbahçe
Timber 19'; Hadj Moussa 90+1'	Report	Amrabat 86'

De Kuip, Rotterdam
Attendance: 42,180
Referee: Glenn Nyberg (Sweden)
12 August 2025
19:00 (20:00 UTC+3)

Fenerbahçe (Turkey)	5–2	(Netherlands) Feyenoord
Brown 44'; Durán 45+2'; Fred 55'; En-Nesyri 83'; Talisca 90+6'	Report	Watanabe 41', 89'

Şükrü Saracoğlu Stadium, Istanbul
Attendance: 39,497
Referee: István Kovács (Romania)

Fenerbahçe won 6–4 on aggregate.

== Play-off round ==
The draw for the play-off round was held on 4 August 2025. The first legs were played on 19 and 20 August, and the second legs were played on 26 and 27 August.

=== Seeding ===
A total of 14 teams played in the play-off round. Seeding of the teams was based on their 2025 UEFA club coefficients. The teams were divided into seeded and unseeded pots. The first team drawn in each tie was the home team for the first leg.

Seeded	Unseeded
(Norway) Bodø/Glimt; (Denmark) Copenhagen; (Serbia) Red Star Belgrade; (Hungary) Ferencváros; (Scotland) Celtic	(Kazakhstan) Kairat; (Switzerland) Basel; (Azerbaijan) Qarabağ; (Cyprus) Pafos; (Austria) Sturm Graz

Seeded	Unseeded
(Portugal) Benfica; (Belgium) Club Brugge	(Scotland) Rangers; (Turkey) Fenerbahçe

Notes

1. ^{†} Winners of the third qualifying round, whose identity was not known at the time of draw. Teams in italics defeated a team with a higher coefficient, thus effectively taking the coefficient of their opponent in the draw.

=== Summary ===
The first legs were played on 19 and 20 August, and the second legs were played on 26 and 27 August 2025.

The winners of the ties advanced to the league phase. The losers were transferred to the Europa League league phase.

Play-off round
Team 1	Agg.	Team 2	1st leg	2nd leg
Champions Path
Ferencváros (Hungary)	4–5	(Azerbaijan) Qarabağ	1–3	3–2
Red Star Belgrade (Serbia)	2–3	(Cyprus) Pafos	1–2	1–1
Bodø/Glimt (Norway)	6–2	(Austria) Sturm Graz	5–0	1–2
Celtic (Scotland)	0–0 (2–3 p)	(Kazakhstan) Kairat	0–0	0–0 (a.e.t.)
Basel (Switzerland)	1–3	(Denmark) Copenhagen	1–1	0–2
League Path
Fenerbahçe (Turkey)	0–1	(Portugal) Benfica	0–0	0–1
Rangers (Scotland)	1–9	(Belgium) Club Brugge	1–3	0–6

=== Champions Path matches ===
19 August 2025
21:00

Ferencváros (Hungary)	1–3	(Azerbaijan) Qarabağ
Varga 29'	Report	Janković 50'; Medina 67'; Qurbanlı 85'

Ferencváros Stadion, Budapest
Attendance: 19,675
Referee: João Pinheiro (Portugal)
27 August 2025
18:45 (20:45 UTC+4)

Qarabağ (Azerbaijan)	2–3	(Hungary) Ferencváros
Leandro 25'; Zoubir 45'	Report	Joseph 12'; Varga 55' (pen.); Tóth 82'

Tofiq Bahramov Republican Stadium, Baku
Attendance: 29,744
Referee: Clément Turpin (France)

Qarabağ won 5–4 on aggregate.

19 August 2025
21:00

Red Star Belgrade (Serbia)	1–2	(Cyprus) Pafos
Bruno Duarte 58'	Report	Correia 1'; Pêpê 52' (pen.)

Red Star Stadium, Belgrade
Attendance: 43,411
Referee: Alejandro Hernández Hernández (Spain)
26 August 2025
21:00 (22:00 UTC+3)

Pafos (Cyprus)	1–1	(Serbia) Red Star Belgrade
Jajá 89'	Report	Ivanić 60'

Alphamega Stadium, Limassol
Attendance: 8,422
Referee: Michael Oliver (England)

Pafos won 3–2 on aggregate.

20 August 2025
21:00

Bodø/Glimt (Norway)	5–0	(Austria) Sturm Graz
Høgh 7'; Bjørtuft 10'; Saltnes 25'; Evjen 54'; Bøving 79' (o.g.)	Report

Aspmyra Stadion, Bodø
Attendance: 7,896
Referee: Sandro Schärer (Switzerland)
26 August 2025
21:00

Sturm Graz (Austria)	2–1	(Norway) Bodø/Glimt
Jatta 30'; Oermann 73'	Report	Jørgensen 15'

Wörthersee Stadion, Klagenfurt (Note: Sturm Graz played their home matches at Wörthersee Stadion in Klagenfurt, instead of their regular stadium, Liebenauer Stadium in Graz, which did not meet UEFA requirements.)
Attendance: 9,050
Referee: Szymon Marciniak (Poland)

Bodø/Glimt won 6–2 on aggregate.

20 August 2025
21:00 (20:00 UTC+1)

Celtic (Scotland)	0–0	(Kazakhstan) Kairat
	Report

Celtic Park, Glasgow
Attendance: 56,182
Referee: Espen Eskås (Norway)
26 August 2025
18:45 (21:45 UTC+5)

Kairat (Kazakhstan)	0–0 (a.e.t.)	(Scotland) Celtic
	Report
Penalties
Gromyko (penalty missed); Martynovich (penalty scored); Arad (penalty scored); Sorokin (penalty scored)	3–2	(penalty missed) Idah; (penalty missed) McCowan; (penalty scored) Engels; (penalty scored) McGregor; (penalty missed) Maeda

Central Stadium, Almaty
Attendance: 22,800
Referee: Maurizio Mariani (Italy)

0–0 on aggregate; Kairat won 3–2 on penalties.

20 August 2025
21:00

Basel (Switzerland)	1–1	(Denmark) Copenhagen
Shaqiri 14' (pen.)	Report	Pereira 45+3'

St. Jakob-Park, Basel
Attendance: 25,847
Referee: Anthony Taylor (England)
27 August 2025
21:00

Copenhagen (Denmark)	2–0	(Switzerland) Basel
Cornelius 46'; Moukoko 84' (pen.)	Report

Parken Stadium, Copenhagen
Attendance: 34,854
Referee: István Kovács (Romania)

Copenhagen won 3–1 on aggregate.

=== League Path matches ===
20 August 2025
21:00 (22:00 UTC+3)

Fenerbahçe (Turkey)	0–0	(Portugal) Benfica
	Report

Şükrü Saracoğlu Stadium, Istanbul
Attendance: 41,258
Referee: Daniel Siebert (Germany)
27 August 2025
21:00 (20:00 UTC+1)

Benfica (Portugal)	1–0	(Turkey) Fenerbahçe
Aktürkoğlu 35'	Report

Estádio da Luz, Lisbon
Attendance: 64,323
Referee: Slavko Vinčić (Slovenia)

Benfica won 1–0 on aggregate.

19 August 2025
21:00 (20:00 UTC+1)

Rangers (Scotland)	1–3	(Belgium) Club Brugge
Danilo 50'	Report	Vermant 3'; Spileers 7'; Mechele 20'

Ibrox Stadium, Glasgow
Attendance: 43,731
Referee: François Letexier (France)
27 August 2025
21:00

Club Brugge (Belgium)	6–0	(Scotland) Rangers
Tresoldi 5'; Vanaken 32'; Seys 41', 45'; Stanković 45+2'; Tzolis 50'	Report

Jan Breydel Stadium, Bruges
Attendance: 26,252
Referee: Felix Zwayer (Germany)

Club Brugge won 9–1 on aggregate.
