= 2025–26 UEFA Europa League qualifying =

Football tournament qualification stage

2025–26 UEFA Europa League qualifying was the preliminary phase of the 2025–26 UEFA Europa League, prior to the competition proper. Qualification consisted of the qualifying phase (first to third rounds) and the play-off round. It began on 10 July and ended on 28 August 2025.

A total of 53 teams competed in the qualifying system, which included the qualifying phase and the play-off round. The 12 winners of the play-off round advanced to the league phase, to join the 13 teams that entered in the league stage, along with the seven losers of the Champions League play-off round (five from the Champions Path and two from the League Path), and the four losers of the Champions League third qualifying round (League Path).

Times are CEST (UTC+2), as listed by UEFA (local times, if different, are in parentheses).

== Format ==
The qualifying phase was split into two paths – the Champions Path and the Main Path. The Champions Path contained teams which were eliminated from the Champions League Champions Path, and the Main Path contained teams which qualified as the third-placed or the fourth-placed team from their domestic league or as domestic cup winners. The paths were merged in the play-off round.

Each tie was played over two legs, with each team playing one leg at home. The team that scored more goals on aggregate over the two legs advanced to the next round. If the aggregate score was level at the end of normal time of the second leg, extra time was played, and if the same number of goals were scored by both teams during extra time, the tie was decided by a penalty shoot-out.

In the draws for each round, teams were seeded based on their UEFA club coefficients at the beginning of the season, with the teams divided into seeded and unseeded pots containing the same number of teams. A seeded team was drawn against an unseeded team, with the order of legs in each tie decided by draw. As the identity of the winners of the previous round may not have been known at the time of the draws, the seeding was carried out under the assumption that the team with the higher coefficient of an undecided tie advanced to the subsequent round. In practice, this meant if the team with the lower coefficient advanced in the Europa League or the team with the higher coefficient was eliminated from the Champions League, it simply took the seeding of its opponent.

Prior to the draws, UEFA formed "groups" in accordance with the principles set by the Club Competitions Committee, purely for the convenience of the draw and not to resemble any real groupings in the sense of the competition. Teams from associations with political conflicts as decided by UEFA could not be drawn into the same tie. After the draws, the order of legs of a tie could be reversed by UEFA due to scheduling or venue conflicts.

== Schedule ==
The schedule of the competition was as follows. Matches were scheduled for Thursdays, though exceptionally could take place on Tuesdays or Wednesdays due to scheduling conflicts.

Schedule for 2025–26 UEFA Europa League
Round	Draw date	First leg	Second leg
First qualifying round	17 June 2025	10 July 2025	17 July 2025
Second qualifying round	18 June 2025	24 July 2025	31 July 2025
Third qualifying round	21 July 2025	7 August 2025	14 August 2025
Play-off round	4 August 2025	21 August 2025	28 August 2025

== Teams ==
In the qualifying stage, the teams were divided into two paths:

- Champions Path (12 teams):
  - Third qualifying round: 12 losers of the Champions League Champions Path second qualifying round.
- Main Path:
  - First qualifying round (16 teams): 16 teams which entered in this round.
  - Second qualifying round (16 teams): 8 teams which entered in this round, and 8 winners of the first qualifying round.
  - Third qualifying round (14 teams): 3 teams which entered in this round, 3 losers of the Champions League League Path second qualifying round, and 8 winners of the second qualifying round.

The winners of the third qualifying round were combined into a single path for the play-off round:

- Play-off round (24 teams): 5 teams which entered this round, 6 losers of the Champions League Champions Path third qualifying round, 6 winners of the Champions Path third qualifying round, and 7 winners of the Main Path third qualifying round.

All teams eliminated from the qualifying phase and play-off round entered the Conference League:

- The 8 losers of the Main Path first qualifying round entered the Main Path second qualifying round.
- The 8 losers of the Main Path second qualifying round entered the Main Path third qualifying round.
- The 6 losers of the Champions Path third qualifying round entered the Champions Path play-off round.
- The 7 losers of the Main Path third qualifying round entered the Main Path play-off round.
- The 12 losers of the play-off round entered the league phase.

Below were the participating teams (with their 2025 UEFA club coefficients, not used as seeding for the Champions Path, however), grouped by their starting rounds.

Key to colours
Winners of play-off round advanced to league phase
Losers of play-off round entered Conference League league phase
Losers of third qualifying round entered Conference League play-off round
Losers of second qualifying round entered Conference League third qualifying round
Losers of first qualifying round entered Conference League second qualifying round

Play-off round
Team	Coeff.
(Switzerland) Young Boys	34.500
(Slovakia) Slovan Bratislava	33.500
(Bulgaria) Ludogorets Razgrad	24.000
(Ukraine) Dynamo Kyiv	23.500
(Poland) Lech Poznań	19.000
(Sweden) Malmö FF	14.500
(Belgium) Genk	11.370
(Scotland) Aberdeen	9.500
(Czech Republic) Sigma Olomouc	8.820
(Turkey) Samsunspor	8.780
(North Macedonia) Shkëndija	7.500

Third qualifying round (Champions Path)
Team	Coeff.
(Israel) Maccabi Tel Aviv	37.500
(Romania) FCSB	22.500
(Croatia) Rijeka	12.000
(Latvia) RFS	11.000
(Bosnia and Herzegovina) Zrinjski Mostar	10.000
(Gibraltar) Lincoln Red Imps	10.000
(Finland) KuPS	10.000
(Kosovo) Drita	9.000
(Iceland) Breiðablik	9.000
(Malta) Hamrun Spartans	6.000
(Armenia) Noah	5.000
(Republic of Ireland) Shelbourne	2.993

Third qualifying round (Main Path)
Team	Coeff.
(Greece) PAOK	42.250
(Greece) Panathinaikos	16.000
(Switzerland) Servette	11.500
(Austria) Wolfsberger AC	9.500
(Norway) Brann	7.937
(Norway) Fredrikstad	7.937

Second qualifying round
Team	Coeff.
(Portugal) Braga	46.000
(Denmark) Midtjylland	32.750
(Belgium) Anderlecht	28.250
(Switzerland) Lugano	19.250
(Turkey) Beşiktaş	15.000
(Netherlands) Utrecht	13.430
(Czech Republic) Baník Ostrava	8.820
(Scotland) Hibernian	7.110

First qualifying round
Team	Coeff.
(Ukraine) Shakhtar Donetsk	52.000
(Poland) Legia Warsaw	31.000
(Serbia) Partizan	22.000
(Moldova) Sheriff Tiraspol	20.000
(Romania) CFR Cluj	19.000
(Israel) Hapoel Be'er Sheva	16.500
(Slovenia) Celje	14.000
(Slovakia) Spartak Trnava	8.500
(Cyprus) AEK Larnaca	7.500
(Sweden) BK Häcken	7.000
(Hungary) Paks	4.800
(Bulgaria) Levski Sofia	4.500
(Azerbaijan) Sabah	4.000
(Finland) Ilves	3.000
(Kazakhstan) Aktobe	3.000
(Kosovo) Prishtina	2.500

Notes

1. ^{CH Q3} Losers of Champions League third qualifying round (Champions Path).
2. ^{CH Q2} Losers of Champions League second qualifying round (Champions Path).
3. ^{LP Q2} Losers of Champions League second qualifying round (League Path).

== First qualifying round ==
The draw for the first qualifying round was held on 17 June 2025.

=== Seeding ===
A total of 16 teams played in the first qualifying round. Seeding of the teams was based on their 2025 UEFA club coefficients. Before the draw, UEFA allocated the teams into two groups of four seeded teams and four unseeded teams in accordance with the principles set by the Club Competitions Committee. The first team drawn in each tie was the home team for the first leg.

Group 1		Group 2	
Seeded	Unseeded	Seeded	Unseeded
(Ukraine) Shakhtar Donetsk; (Moldova) Sheriff Tiraspol; (Slovenia) Celje; (Slovakia) Spartak Trnava	(Sweden) BK Häcken; (Azerbaijan) Sabah; (Finland) Ilves; (Kosovo) Prishtina	(Poland) Legia Warsaw; (Serbia) Partizan; (Romania) CFR Cluj; (Israel) Hapoel Be'er Sheva	(Cyprus) AEK Larnaca; (Hungary) Paks; (Bulgaria) Levski Sofia; (Kazakhstan) Aktobe

=== Summary ===
The first legs were played on 10 July, and the second legs were played on 17 July 2025.

The winners of the ties advanced to the second qualifying round. The losers were transferred to the Conference League Main Path second qualifying round.

First qualifying round
Team 1	Agg.	Team 2	1st leg	2nd leg
Shakhtar Donetsk (Ukraine)	6–0	(Finland) Ilves	6–0	0–0
Sheriff Tiraspol (Moldova)	5–2	(Kosovo) Prishtina	4–0	1–2
Spartak Trnava (Slovakia)	2–3	(Sweden) BK Häcken	0–1	2–2
Sabah (Azerbaijan)	5–6	(Slovenia) Celje	2–3	3–3 (a.e.t.)
Legia Warsaw (Poland)	2–0	(Kazakhstan) Aktobe	1–0	1–0
Levski Sofia (Bulgaria)	1–1 (3–1 p)	(Israel) Hapoel Be'er Sheva	0–0	1–1 (a.e.t.)
AEK Larnaca (Cyprus)	2–2 (6–5 p)	(Serbia) Partizan	1–0	1–2 (a.e.t.)
Paks (Hungary)	0–3	(Romania) CFR Cluj	0–0	0–3

=== Matches ===
10 July 2025
20:00

Shakhtar Donetsk (Ukraine)	6–0	(Finland) Ilves
Alisson 26', 47'; Kauã Elias 43'; Kevin 74'; Pedrinho 87'; Newerton 89'	Report

Stožice Stadium, Ljubljana, Slovenia (Note: Due to the Russian invasion of Ukraine, Ukrainian teams were required to play their home matches at neutral venues until further notice.)
Attendance: 650
Referee: Marc Nagtegaal (Netherlands)
17 July 2025
18:00 (19:00 UTC+3)

Ilves (Finland)	0–0	(Ukraine) Shakhtar Donetsk
	Report

Tammelan Stadion, Tampere
Attendance: 7,315
Referee: Mohammad Usman Aslam (Norway)

Shakhtar Donetsk won 6–0 on aggregate.

10 July 2025
19:00 (20:00 UTC+3)

Sheriff Tiraspol (Moldova)	4–0	(Kosovo) Prishtina
Bayala 11', 19', 74'; Odede 79'	Report

Sheriff Arena, Tiraspol
Attendance: 6,223
Referee: Dario Bel (Croatia)
17 July 2025
20:00

Prishtina (Kosovo)	2–1	(Moldova) Sheriff Tiraspol
Namani 56'; Ahmeti 65'	Report	Serobyan 51'

Fadil Vokrri Stadium, Pristina
Attendance: 1,320
Referee: Henrik Nalbandyan (Armenia)

Sheriff Tiraspol won 5–2 on aggregate.

10 July 2025
20:15

Spartak Trnava (Slovakia)	0–1	(Sweden) BK Häcken
	Report	Nioule 63'

Anton Malatinský Stadium, Trnava
Attendance: 10,125
Referee: Bence Csonka (Hungary)
17 July 2025
19:00

BK Häcken (Sweden)	2–2	(Slovakia) Spartak Trnava
Gustafson 13' (pen.); Dembe 90+6'	Report	Procházka 65'; Moistsrapishvili 82'

Bravida Arena, Gothenburg
Attendance: 3,636
Referee: Ívar Orri Kristjánsson (Iceland)

BK Häcken won 3–2 on aggregate.

10 July 2025
18:00 (20:00 UTC+4)

Sabah (Azerbaijan)	2–3	(Slovenia) Celje
Šafranko 3', 18' (pen.)	Report	Kovačević 7', 48'; Hrka 90+4'

Bank Respublika Arena, Masazir
Attendance: 7,000
Referee: Daniyar Sakhi (Kazakhstan)
17 July 2025
20:00

Celje (Slovenia)	3–3 (a.e.t.)	(Azerbaijan) Sabah
Kovačević 19' (pen.); Vuklišević 49'; Iosifov 108'	Report	Mickels 9', 63', 64'

Stadion Z'dežele, Celje
Attendance: 3,068
Referee: Dragomir Draganov (Bulgaria)

Celje won 6–5 on aggregate.

10 July 2025
21:00

Legia Warsaw (Poland)	1–0	(Kazakhstan) Aktobe
Bichakhchyan 25'	Report

Polish Army Stadium, Warsaw
Attendance: 12,239
Referee: Dalibor Černý (Czech Republic)
17 July 2025
18:00 (21:00 UTC+5)

Aktobe (Kazakhstan)	0–1	(Poland) Legia Warsaw
	Report	Elitim 90+1'

Central Stadium, Aktobe
Attendance: 12,190
Referee: Granit Maqedonci (Sweden)

Legia Warsaw won 2–0 on aggregate.

10 July 2025
19:30 (20:30 UTC+3)

Levski Sofia (Bulgaria)	0–0	(Israel) Hapoel Be'er Sheva
	Report

Stadion Georgi Asparuhov, Sofia
Attendance: 15,467
Referee: Ladislav Szikszay (Czech Republic)
17 July 2025
20:00

Hapoel Be'er Sheva (Israel)	1–1 (a.e.t.)	(Bulgaria) Levski Sofia
Turgeman 105+3'	Report	Sangaré 114'
Penalties
Almog (penalty missed); Kangwa (penalty missed); Turgeman (penalty missed); Levy (penalty scored)	1–3	(penalty missed) Rupanov; (penalty scored) Fabien; (penalty scored) Makoun; (penalty scored) Sangaré

Városi Stadion, Nyíregyháza, Hungary (Note: Due to the Gaza war, Israeli teams were required to play their home matches at neutral venues until further notice.)
Attendance: 721
Referee: Florian Badstübner (Germany)

1–1 on aggregate; Levski Sofia won 3–1 on penalties.

10 July 2025
18:30 (19:30 UTC+3)

AEK Larnaca (Cyprus)	1–0	(Serbia) Partizan
Cabrera 67'	Report

AEK Arena – Georgios Karapatakis, Larnaca
Attendance: 4,127
Referee: Jacob Karlsen (Denmark)
17 July 2025
21:00

Partizan (Serbia)	2–1 (a.e.t.)	(Cyprus) AEK Larnaca
Ugrešić 69'; D. Jovanović 118'	Report	Pons 104'
Penalties
Natcho (penalty scored); Milovanović (penalty scored); Roganović (penalty missed); Kalulu (penalty missed); Karabelyov (penalty scored); A. Kostić (penalty scored); D. Jovanović (penalty scored); B. Kostić (penalty missed)	5–6	(penalty missed) Miličević; (penalty scored) Ledes; (penalty scored) Suárez; (penalty missed) Chacón; (penalty scored) Ivanović; (penalty scored) Pons; (penalty scored) Miramón; (penalty scored) Gnali

Partizan Stadium, Belgrade
Attendance: 23,253
Referee: Gustavo Correia (Portugal)

2–2 on aggregate; AEK Larnaca won 6–5 on penalties.

10 July 2025
19:00

Paks (Hungary)	0–0	(Romania) CFR Cluj
	Report

Fehérvári úti Stadion, Paks
Attendance: 3,916
Referee: Pavle Ilić (Serbia)
17 July 2025
19:30 (20:30 UTC+3)

CFR Cluj (Romania)	3–0	(Hungary) Paks
Fică 35'; Munteanu 85'; Muhar 90'	Report

Dr. Constantin Rădulescu Stadium, Cluj-Napoca
Attendance: 6,512
Referee: Kyriakos Athanasiou (Cyprus)

CFR Cluj won 3–0 on aggregate.

== Second qualifying round ==
The draw for the second qualifying round was held on 18 June 2025.

=== Seeding ===
A total of 16 teams played in the second qualifying round. Seeding of the teams was based on their 2025 UEFA club coefficients. Before the draw, UEFA allocated the teams into two groups of four seeded teams and four unseeded teams in accordance with the principles set by the Club Competitions Committee. The first team drawn in each tie was the home team for the first leg.

Group 1		Group 2	
Seeded	Unseeded	Seeded	Unseeded
(Portugal) Braga; (Poland) Legia Warsaw; (Cyprus) AEK Larnaca; (Switzerland) Lugano	(Romania) CFR Cluj; (Bulgaria) Levski Sofia; (Slovenia) Celje; (Czech Republic) Baník Ostrava	(Ukraine) Shakhtar Donetsk; (Denmark) Midtjylland; (Belgium) Anderlecht; (Moldova) Sheriff Tiraspol	(Turkey) Beşiktaş; (Netherlands) Utrecht; (Sweden) BK Häcken; (Scotland) Hibernian

Notes

1. ^{†} Winners of the first qualifying round, whose identity was not known at the time of draw. Teams in italics defeated a team with a higher coefficient, thus effectively taking the coefficient of their opponent in the draw.

=== Summary ===
The first legs were played on 24 July and the second legs were played on 31 July 2025.

The winners of the ties advanced to the Main Path third qualifying round. The losers were transferred to the Conference League Main Path third qualifying round.

Second qualifying round
Team 1	Agg.	Team 2	1st leg	2nd leg
Lugano (Switzerland)	0–1	(Romania) CFR Cluj	0–0	0–1 (a.e.t.)
Celje (Slovenia)	2–3	(Cyprus) AEK Larnaca	1–1	1–2
Levski Sofia (Bulgaria)	0–1	(Portugal) Braga	0–0	0–1 (a.e.t.)
Baník Ostrava (Czech Republic)	3–4	(Poland) Legia Warsaw	2–2	1–2
Anderlecht (Belgium)	2–2 (2–4 p)	(Sweden) BK Häcken	1–0	1–2 (a.e.t.)
Sheriff Tiraspol (Moldova)	2–7	(Netherlands) Utrecht	1–3	1–4
Midtjylland (Denmark)	3–2	(Scotland) Hibernian	1–1	2–1 (a.e.t.)
Beşiktaş (Turkey)	2–6	(Ukraine) Shakhtar Donetsk	2–4	0–2

=== Matches ===
24 July 2025
20:30

Lugano (Switzerland)	0–0	(Romania) CFR Cluj
	Report

Stockhorn Arena, Thun (Note: Lugano played their home matches at the Stockhorn Arena, in Thun, instead of their regular stadium, the Cornaredo Stadium, in Lugano, due to renovation works.)
Attendance: 941
Referee: Darren England (England)
31 July 2025
19:30 (20:30 UTC+3)

CFR Cluj (Romania)	1–0 (a.e.t.)	(Switzerland) Lugano
Sinyan 96'	Report

Dr. Constantin Rădulescu Stadium, Cluj-Napoca
Attendance: 8,564
Referee: Allard Lindhout (Netherlands)

CFR Cluj won 1–0 on aggregate.

24 July 2025
20:00

Celje (Slovenia)	1–1	(Cyprus) AEK Larnaca
Kovačević 28' (pen.)	Report	Miličević 53' (pen.)

Stadion Z'dežele, Celje
Attendance: 3,145
Referee: Bastien Dechepy (France)
31 July 2025
18:30 (19:30 UTC+3)

AEK Larnaca (Cyprus)	2–1	(Slovenia) Celje
Chacón 43'; García 67'	Report	Kvesić 88'

AEK Arena – Georgios Karapatakis, Larnaca
Attendance: 4,108
Referee: Chris Kavanagh (England)

AEK Larnaca won 3–2 on aggregate.

24 July 2025
19:30 (20:30 UTC+3)

Levski Sofia (Bulgaria)	0–0	(Portugal) Braga
	Report

Stadion Georgi Asparuhov, Sofia
Attendance: 16,040
Referee: Matteo Marchetti (Italy)
31 July 2025
21:00 (20:00 UTC+1)

Braga (Portugal)	1–0 (a.e.t.)	(Bulgaria) Levski Sofia
Fran Navarro 104'	Report

Estádio Municipal, Braga
Attendance: 16,771
Referee: Lothar D'hondt (Belgium)

Braga won 1–0 on aggregate.

24 July 2025
19:00

Baník Ostrava (Czech Republic)	2–2	(Poland) Legia Warsaw
Šín 13'; Frydrych 65'	Report	Kapustka 32'; Nsame 88'

Městský stadion, Ostrava
Attendance: 15,047
Referee: Christian-Petru Ciochirca (Austria)
31 July 2025
21:00

Legia Warsaw (Poland)	2–1	(Czech Republic) Baník Ostrava
Nsame 54'; Pojezný 74' (o.g.)	Report	Prekop 15'

Polish Army Stadium, Warsaw
Attendance: 20,226
Referee: Novak Simović (Serbia)

Legia Warsaw won 4–3 on aggregate.

24 July 2025
20:00

Anderlecht (Belgium)	1–0	(Sweden) BK Häcken
Dolberg 35'	Report

Constant Vanden Stock Stadium, Brussels
Attendance: 12,291
Referee: Eldorjan Hamiti (Albania)
31 July 2025
19:00

BK Häcken (Sweden)	2–1 (a.e.t.)	(Belgium) Anderlecht
Svanbäck 33'; Gustafson 90+2' (pen.)	Report	Dolberg 54' (pen.)
Penalties
Gustafson (penalty scored); Layouni (penalty scored); Lundkvist (penalty scored); Berisha (penalty scored)	4–2	(penalty scored) Hazard; (penalty missed) Augustinsson; (penalty scored) Llansana; (penalty missed) Vázquez

Bravida Arena, Gothenburg
Attendance: 4,016
Referee: Patrik Kolarić (Croatia)

2–2 on aggregate; BK Häcken won 4–2 on penalties.

24 July 2025
19:00 (20:00 UTC+3)

Sheriff Tiraspol (Moldova)	1–3	(Netherlands) Utrecht
Ademo 24'	Report	Jensen 33'; Viergever 54'; Blake 70'

Central Stadium, Nisporeni (Note: Sheriff Tiraspol played their second qualifying round home match at the Central Stadium in Nisporeni, instead of their regular stadium, the Sheriff Arena, in Tiraspol, due to the Dutch government's travel advisory concerning Transnistria.)
Attendance: 2,674
Referee: Philip Farrugia (Malta)
31 July 2025
20:00

Utrecht (Netherlands)	4–1	(Moldova) Sheriff Tiraspol
Jensen 27'; Horemans 46'; Viergever 56'; El Karouani 89'	Report	Odede 75'

Stadion Galgenwaard, Utrecht
Attendance: 21,611
Referee: Chrysovalantis Theouli (Cyprus)

Utrecht won 7–2 on aggregate.

24 July 2025
19:30

Midtjylland (Denmark)	1–1	(Scotland) Hibernian
Şimşir 72'	Report	McGrath 7'

MCH Arena, Herning
Attendance: 8,863
Referee: Robert Schröder (Germany)
31 July 2025
21:00 (20:00 UTC+1)

Hibernian (Scotland)	1–2 (a.e.t.)	(Denmark) Midtjylland
Bushiri 105+2'	Report	Osorio 94'; Brumado 119'

Easter Road, Edinburgh
Attendance: 19,536
Referee: Gustavo Correia (Portugal)

Midtjylland won 3–2 on aggregate.

24 July 2025
20:00 (21:00 UTC+3)

Beşiktaş (Turkey)	2–4	(Ukraine) Shakhtar Donetsk
Abraham 40' (pen.); João Mário 87'	Report	Alisson 7'; Eguinaldo 28'; Kevin 67', 90+6'

Beşiktaş Stadium, Istanbul
Attendance: 31,739
Referee: Georgi Kabakov (Bulgaria)
31 July 2025
20:00

Shakhtar Donetsk (Ukraine)	2–0	(Turkey) Beşiktaş
Kevin 12'; Kauã Elias 45+1'	Report

Henryk Reyman Municipal Stadium, Kraków, Poland
Attendance: 12,828
Referee: Juan Martínez Munuera (Spain)

Shakhtar Donetsk won 6–2 on aggregate.

== Third qualifying round ==
The draw for the third qualifying round was held on 21 July 2025.

=== Seeding ===
A total of 26 teams played in the third qualifying round. Seeding of the teams was based on their 2025 UEFA club coefficients. Before the draw, UEFA formed groups of seeded and unseeded teams per the principles set by the Club Competitions Committee. The first team drawn in each tie was the home team for the first leg.

Champions Path
Group 1		Group 2	
Seeded	Unseeded	Seeded	Unseeded
(Croatia) Rijeka; (Latvia) RFS; (Gibraltar) Lincoln Red Imps	(Finland) KuPS; (Armenia) Noah; (Republic of Ireland) Shelbourne	(Israel) Maccabi Tel Aviv; (Bosnia and Herzegovina) Zrinjski Mostar; (Kosovo) Drita	(Iceland) Breiðablik; (Romania) FCSB; (Malta) Hamrun Spartans

Main Path
Group 1		Group 2	
Seeded	Unseeded	Seeded	Unseeded
(Portugal) Braga; (Greece) PAOK; (Denmark) Midtjylland; (Poland) Legia Warsaw	(Romania) CFR Cluj; (Cyprus) AEK Larnaca; (Austria) Wolfsberger AC; (Norway) Fredrikstad	(Ukraine) Shakhtar Donetsk; (Sweden) BK Häcken; (Netherlands) Utrecht	(Greece) Panathinaikos; (Switzerland) Servette; (Norway) Brann

Notes

1. ^{†} Losers of the Champions League second qualifying round, whose identity was not known at the time of draw. Teams in italics lost to a team with a lower coefficient, thus effectively taking the coefficient of their opponent in the draw.
2. ^{††} Winners of the second qualifying round, whose identity was not known at the time of draw. Teams in italics defeated a team with a higher coefficient, thus effectively taking the coefficient of their opponent in the draw.

=== Summary ===
The first legs were played on 5, 6 and 7 August, and the second legs were played on 12 and 14 August 2025.

The winners of the ties advanced to the play-off round. The losers were transferred to the Conference League play-off round.

Third qualifying round
Team 1	Agg.	Team 2	1st leg	2nd leg
Champions Path
Lincoln Red Imps (Gibraltar)	1–1 (6–5 p)	(Armenia) Noah	1–1	0–0 (a.e.t.)
Rijeka (Croatia)	4–3	(Republic of Ireland) Shelbourne	1–2	3–1
RFS (Latvia)	1–3	(Finland) KuPS	1–2	0–1
Hamrun Spartans (Malta)	2–5	(Israel) Maccabi Tel Aviv	1–2	1–3
Zrinjski Mostar (Bosnia and Herzegovina)	3–2	(Iceland) Breiðablik	1–1	2–1
FCSB (Romania)	6–3	(Kosovo) Drita	3–2	3–1
Main Path
AEK Larnaca (Cyprus)	5–3	(Poland) Legia Warsaw	4–1	1–2
Fredrikstad (Norway)	1–5	(Denmark) Midtjylland	1–3	0–2
CFR Cluj (Romania)	1–4	(Portugal) Braga	1–2	0–2
PAOK (Greece)	1–0	(Austria) Wolfsberger AC	0–0	1–0 (a.e.t.)
Servette (Switzerland)	2–5	(Netherlands) Utrecht	1–3	1–2
BK Häcken (Sweden)	1–2	(Norway) Brann	0–2	1–0
Panathinaikos (Greece)	0–0 (4–3 p)	(Ukraine) Shakhtar Donetsk	0–0	0–0 (a.e.t.)

=== Champions Path matches ===
7 August 2025
18:00

Lincoln Red Imps (Gibraltar)	1–1	(Armenia) Noah
De Barr 45+9'	Report	Eteki 9'

Europa Sports Park, Gibraltar (Note: Lincoln Red Imps played their third qualifying round home match at Europa Sports Park, instead of their regular stadium, Victoria Stadium in Gibraltar, due to renovation works.)
Attendance: 728
Referee: Filip Glova (Slovakia)
14 August 2025
18:00 (20:00 UTC+4)

Noah (Armenia)	0–0 (a.e.t.)	(Gibraltar) Lincoln Red Imps
	Report
Penalties
Mulahusejnović (penalty scored); Manvelyan (penalty scored); Muradyan (penalty missed); Jakoliš (penalty scored); Hambardzumyan (penalty scored); Þórarinsson (penalty scored); Eteki (penalty missed)	5–6	(penalty missed) Nano; (penalty scored) De Barr; (penalty scored) Juanje; (penalty scored) Gómez; (penalty scored) Rutjens; (penalty scored) Clinton; (penalty scored) Lopes

Abovyan City Stadium, Abovyan
Attendance: 3,100
Referee: Sebastian Gishamer (Austria)

1–1 on aggregate; Lincoln Red Imps won 6–5 on penalties.

6 August 2025
20:45

Rijeka (Croatia)	1–2	(Republic of Ireland) Shelbourne
Janković 56' (pen.)	Report	Bone 58'; Martin 70'

Stadion Rujevica, Rijeka
Attendance: 6,495
Referee: Ricardo de Burgos Bengoetxea (Spain)
12 August 2025
20:45 (19:45 UTC+1)

Shelbourne (Republic of Ireland)	1–3	(Croatia) Rijeka
Odubeko 86' (pen.)	Report	Fruk 33'; Dantas 73'; Oreč 90'

Tolka Park, Dublin
Attendance: 3,655
Referee: Marian Alexandru Barbu (Romania)

Rijeka won 4–3 on aggregate.

6 August 2025
19:00 (20:00 UTC+3)

RFS (Latvia)	1–2	(Finland) KuPS
Diedhiou 61'	Report	Oksanen 14'; Toure 24'

LNK Sporta Parks, Riga
Attendance: 1,584
Referee: Aliyar Aghayev (Azerbaijan)
14 August 2025
17:00 (18:00 UTC+3)

KuPS (Finland)	1–0	(Latvia) RFS
Pennanen 49'	Report

Kuopio Football Stadium, Kuopio
Attendance: 3,022
Referee: Balázs Berke (Hungary)

KuPS won 3–1 on aggregate.

5 August 2025
19:00

Hamrun Spartans (Malta)	1–2	(Israel) Maccabi Tel Aviv
Koffi 71' (pen.)	Report	Revivo 79'; Madmon 90+6'

Tony Bezzina Stadium, Paola (Note: Hamrun Spartans played their home match at the Tony Bezzina Stadium, in Paola, instead of their regular venue, the Victor Tedesco Stadium, in Hamrun, which did not meet UEFA requirements.)
Attendance: 1,097
Referee: Kristo Tohver (Estonia)
14 August 2025
20:00

Maccabi Tel Aviv (Israel)	3–1	(Malta) Hamrun Spartans
Shahar 37', 45+2'; Davida 69'	Report	Mbong 43'

TSC Arena, Bačka Topola, Serbia
Attendance: 145
Referee: Rohit Saggi (Norway)

Maccabi Tel Aviv won 5–2 on aggregate.

7 August 2025
20:00

Zrinjski Mostar (Bosnia and Herzegovina)	1–1	(Iceland) Breiðablik
Bilbija 72' (pen.)	Report	Thomsen 18' (pen.)

Stadion pod Bijelim Brijegom, Mostar
Attendance: 5,600
Referee: Enea Jorgji (Albania)
14 August 2025
19:30 (17:30 UTC±0)

Breiðablik (Iceland)	1–2	(Bosnia and Herzegovina) Zrinjski Mostar
Gunnlaugsson 61' (pen.)	Report	Bilbija 7'; Valgeirsson 47' (o.g.)

Kópavogsvöllur, Kópavogur
Attendance: 1,252
Referee: Anastasios Papapetrou (Greece)

Zrinjski Mostar won 3–2 on aggregate.

7 August 2025
20:30 (21:30 UTC+3)

FCSB (Romania)	3–2	(Kosovo) Drita
Bîrligea 64', 90+4' (pen.); Graovac 72'	Report	Tusha 7'; Manaj 50'

Arena Națională, Bucharest
Attendance: 13,825
Referee: Damian Sylwestrzak (Poland)
14 August 2025
20:00

Drita (Kosovo)	1–3	(Romania) FCSB
Tusha 52'	Report	Cisotti 1'; Miculescu 18'; Politic 85'

Fadil Vokrri Stadium, Pristina (Note: Drita played their home match at the Fadil Vokrri Stadium in Pristina, instead of their regular stadium, the Gjilan City Stadium, in Gjilan, due to renovation works.)
Attendance: 6,530
Referee: Sandro Schärer (Switzerland)

FCSB won 6–3 on aggregate.

=== Main Path matches ===
7 August 2025
18:30 (19:30 UTC+3)

AEK Larnaca (Cyprus)	4–1	(Poland) Legia Warsaw
Pons 16'; Angielski 48'; Chacón 78'; Rajović 85' (o.g.)	Report	Nsame 18'

AEK Arena – Georgios Karapatakis, Larnaca
Attendance: 4,102
Referee: Horațiu Feșnic (Romania)
14 August 2025
21:00

Legia Warsaw (Poland)	2–1	(Cyprus) AEK Larnaca
Nsame 11'; Rajović 16'	Report	Ivanović 52'

Polish Army Stadium, Warsaw
Attendance: 23,673
Referee: Andris Treimanis (Latvia)

AEK Larnaca won 5–3 on aggregate.

7 August 2025
18:00

Fredrikstad (Norway)	1–3	(Denmark) Midtjylland
Bjartalíð 77'	Report	Franculino 14'; Gogorza 32'; Castillo 79'

Fredrikstad Stadion, Fredrikstad
Attendance: 8,779
Referee: Igor Pajač (Croatia)
14 August 2025
18:00

Midtjylland (Denmark)	2–0	(Norway) Fredrikstad
Bech 9'; Paulinho 17'	Report

MCH Arena, Herning
Attendance: 8,464
Referee: Julian Weinberger (Austria)

Midtjylland won 5–1 on aggregate.

7 August 2025
18:30 (19:30 UTC+3)

CFR Cluj (Romania)	1–2	(Portugal) Braga
Sinyan 30'	Report	Gorby 17', 50'

Dr. Constantin Rădulescu Stadium, Cluj-Napoca
Attendance: 10,383
Referee: Elchin Masiyev (Azerbaijan)
14 August 2025
20:30 (19:30 UTC+1)

Braga (Portugal)	2–0	(Romania) CFR Cluj
Zalazar 19' (pen.), 45+5'	Report

Estádio Municipal, Braga
Attendance: 16,168
Referee: Sascha Stegemann (Germany)

Braga won 4–1 on aggregate.

7 August 2025
19:30 (20:30 UTC+3)

PAOK (Greece)	0–0	(Austria) Wolfsberger AC
	Report

Toumba Stadium, Thessaloniki
Attendance: 21,340
Referee: Morten Krogh (Denmark)
14 August 2025
19:00

Wolfsberger AC (Austria)	0–1 (a.e.t.)	(Greece) PAOK
	Report	Camara 115'

Wörthersee Stadion, Klagenfurt (Note: Wolfsberger AC played their home matches at the Wörthersee Stadion, in Klagenfurt, instead of their regular venue, the Lavanttal-Arena, in Wolfsberg, which did not meet UEFA requirements.)
Attendance: 6,720
Referee: Orel Grinfeld (Israel)

PAOK won 1–0 on aggregate.

7 August 2025
20:30

Servette (Switzerland)	1–3	(Netherlands) Utrecht
Guillemenot 12'	Report	Baron 52' (o.g.); Horemans 55'; Zechiël 62'

Stade de Genève, Geneva
Attendance: 11,744
Referee: Harm Osmers (Germany)
14 August 2025
20:00

Utrecht (Netherlands)	2–1	(Switzerland) Servette
Jensen 57', 74'	Report	Jallow 80' (pen.)

Stadion Galgenwaard, Utrecht
Attendance: 21,800
Referee: Chris Kavanagh (England)

Utrecht won 5–2 on aggregate.

7 August 2025
19:00

BK Häcken (Sweden)	0–2	(Norway) Brann
	Report	Magnússon 28', 57'

Bravida Arena, Gothenburg
Attendance: 4,516
Referee: Georgi Kabakov (Bulgaria)
14 August 2025
19:00

Brann (Norway)	0–1	(Sweden) BK Häcken
	Report	De Roeve 38' (o.g.)

Brann Stadion, Bergen
Attendance: 14,750
Referee: Nick Walsh (Scotland)

Brann won 2–1 on aggregate.

7 August 2025
20:00 (21:00 UTC+3)

Panathinaikos (Greece)	0–0	(Ukraine) Shakhtar Donetsk
	Report

Olympic Stadium, Athens
Attendance: 20,636
Referee: Erik Lambrechts (Belgium)
14 August 2025
20:00

Shakhtar Donetsk (Ukraine)	0–0 (a.e.t.)	(Greece) Panathinaikos
	Report
Penalties
Nazaryna (penalty missed); Tobías (penalty scored); Bondarenko (penalty scored); Newerton (penalty scored); Kauã Elias (penalty missed); Pedro Henrique (penalty missed)	3–4	(penalty scored) Ioannidis; (penalty scored) Jeremejeff; (penalty missed) Siopis; (penalty scored) Chirivella; (penalty missed) Zaroury; (penalty scored) Mancini

Henryk Reyman Municipal Stadium, Kraków, Poland
Attendance: 13,387
Referee: Daniel Siebert (Germany)

0–0 on aggregate; Panathinaikos won 4–3 on penalties.

== Play-off round ==
The draw for the play-off round was held on 4 August 2025.

=== Seeding ===
A total of 24 teams played in the play-off round. Seeding of the teams was based on their 2025 UEFA club coefficients. Before the draw, UEFA formed groups of seeded and unseeded teams per the principles set by the Club Competitions Committee. The first team drawn in each tie was the home team for the first leg.

Group 1		Group 2		Group 3	
Seeded	Unseeded	Seeded	Unseeded	Seeded	Unseeded
(Israel) Maccabi Tel Aviv; (Switzerland) Young Boys; (Bulgaria) Ludogorets Razgrad; (Sweden) Malmö FF	(Ukraine) Dynamo Kyiv; (Czech Republic) Sigma Olomouc; (North Macedonia) Shkëndija; (Slovakia) Slovan Bratislava	(Greece) Panathinaikos; (Denmark) Midtjylland; (Romania) FCSB; (Poland) Lech Poznań	(Belgium) Genk; (Finland) KuPS; (Scotland) Aberdeen; (Turkey) Samsunspor	(Portugal) Braga; (Greece) PAOK; (Cyprus) AEK Larnaca; (Netherlands) Utrecht	(Croatia) Rijeka; (Bosnia and Herzegovina) Zrinjski Mostar; (Gibraltar) Lincoln Red Imps; (Norway) Brann

Notes

1. ^{†} Losers of the Champions League third qualifying round, whose identity was not known at the time of draw. Teams in italics lost to a team with a lower coefficient, thus effectively taking the coefficient of their opponent in the draw.
2. ^{††} Winners of the third qualifying round, whose identity was not known at the time of draw. Teams in italics defeated a team with a higher coefficient, thus effectively taking the coefficient of their opponent in the draw.

=== Summary ===
The first legs were played on 21 August, and the second legs were played on 27 and 28 August 2025.

The winners of the ties advanced to the league phase. The losers were transferred to the Conference League league phase.

Play-off round
Team 1	Agg.	Team 2	1st leg	2nd leg
Maccabi Tel Aviv (Israel)	3–2	(Ukraine) Dynamo Kyiv	3–1	0–1
Shkëndija (North Macedonia)	3–5	(Bulgaria) Ludogorets Razgrad	2–1	1–4 (a.e.t.)
Slovan Bratislava (Slovakia)	2–4	(Switzerland) Young Boys	0–1	2–3
Malmö FF (Sweden)	5–0	(Czech Republic) Sigma Olomouc	3–0	2–0
Panathinaikos (Greece)	2–1	(Turkey) Samsunspor	2–1	0–0
Aberdeen (Scotland)	2–5	(Romania) FCSB	2–2	0–3
Lech Poznań (Poland)	3–6	(Belgium) Genk	1–5	2–1
Midtjylland (Denmark)	6–0	(Finland) KuPS	4–0	2–0
Lincoln Red Imps (Gibraltar)	1–9	(Portugal) Braga	0–4	1–5
Zrinjski Mostar (Bosnia and Herzegovina)	0–2	(Netherlands) Utrecht	0–2	0–0
Brann (Norway)	6–1	(Cyprus) AEK Larnaca	2–1	4–0
Rijeka (Croatia)	1–5	(Greece) PAOK	1–0	0–5

=== Matches ===
21 August 2025
20:00

Maccabi Tel Aviv (Israel)	3–1	(Ukraine) Dynamo Kyiv
Peretz 12', 69'; Yehezkel 58'	Report	Voloshyn 32'

TSC Arena, Bačka Topola, Serbia
Attendance: 115
Referee: Giorgi Kruashvili (Georgia)
28 August 2025
20:00

Dynamo Kyiv (Ukraine)	1–0	(Israel) Maccabi Tel Aviv
Guerrero 5'	Report

Arena Lublin, Lublin, Poland
Attendance: 1,537
Referee: Nikola Dabanović (Montenegro)

Maccabi Tel Aviv won 3–2 on aggregate.

21 August 2025
20:00

Shkëndija (North Macedonia)	2–1	(Bulgaria) Ludogorets Razgrad
Latifi 35'; Ibraimi 60'	Report	Duarte 17'

Toše Proeski Arena, Skopje (Note: Shkëndija played their home match at the Toše Proeski Arena in Skopje, instead of their regular stadium, the Ecolog Arena, in Tetovo, due to renovation works.)
Attendance: 3,720
Referee: Chris Kavanagh (England)
28 August 2025
19:30 (20:30 UTC+3)

Ludogorets Razgrad (Bulgaria)	4–1 (a.e.t.)	(North Macedonia) Shkëndija
Kurtulus 9'; Chochev 24'; Tekpetey 98'; Bile 120+3'	Report	Tamba 64'

Huvepharma Arena, Razgrad
Attendance: 4,784
Referee: Urs Schnyder (Switzerland)

Ludogorets Razgrad won 5–3 on aggregate.

21 August 2025
20:15

Slovan Bratislava (Slovakia)	0–1	(Switzerland) Young Boys
	Report	Bedia 15'

Tehelné pole, Bratislava
Attendance: 15,008
Referee: Sascha Stegemann (Germany)
28 August 2025
20:00

Young Boys (Switzerland)	3–2	(Slovakia) Slovan Bratislava
Gigović 29', 52'; Bedia 37'	Report	Mak 43'; Strelec 87'

Stadion Wankdorf, Bern
Attendance: 13,806
Referee: Rade Obrenovič (Slovenia)

Young Boys won 4–2 on aggregate.

21 August 2025
19:00

Malmö FF (Sweden)	3–0	(Czech Republic) Sigma Olomouc
Hakšabanović 8', 43'; Johnsen 90+2' (pen.)	Report

Stadion, Malmö
Attendance: 12,355
Referee: Tobias Stieler (Germany)
28 August 2025
18:30

Sigma Olomouc (Czech Republic)	0–2	(Sweden) Malmö FF
	Report	Gudjohnsen 62'; Ekong 90+1'

Andrův stadion, Olomouc
Attendance: 9,508
Referee: Radu Petrescu (Romania)

Malmö FF won 5–0 on aggregate.

21 August 2025
20:00 (21:00 UTC+3)

Panathinaikos (Greece)	2–1	(Turkey) Samsunspor
Kyriakopoulos 66'; Palmer-Brown 74'	Report	Tómasson 51'

Olympic Stadium, Athens
Attendance: 24,000
Referee: Juan Martínez Munuera (Spain)
28 August 2025
19:00 (20:00 UTC+3)

Samsunspor (Turkey)	0–0	(Greece) Panathinaikos
	Report

Samsun 19 Mayıs Stadium, Samsun
Attendance: 24,914
Referee: Irfan Peljto (Bosnia and Herzegovina)

Panathinaikos won 2–1 on aggregate.

21 August 2025
20:45 (19:45 UTC+1)

Aberdeen (Scotland)	2–2	(Romania) FCSB
Polvara 61'; Sokler 90'	Report	Bîrligea 32'; Olaru 47'

Pittodrie Stadium, Aberdeen
Attendance: 17,751
Referee: Serdar Gözübüyük (Netherlands)
28 August 2025
20:30 (21:30 UTC+3)

FCSB (Romania)	3–0	(Scotland) Aberdeen
Olaru 45+1' (pen.), 59'; Șut 52'	Report

Arena Națională, Bucharest
Attendance: 35,341
Referee: Espen Eskås (Norway)

FCSB won 5–2 on aggregate.

21 August 2025
20:30

Lech Poznań (Poland)	1–5	(Belgium) Genk
Jagiełło 19'	Report	Hrošovský 10', 25'; Heynen 33'; Oh Hyeon-gyu 40'; Gurgul 48' (o.g.)

Poznań Stadium, Poznań
Attendance: 25,443
Referee: Donatas Rumšas (Lithuania)
28 August 2025
20:00

Genk (Belgium)	1–2	(Poland) Lech Poznań
Itō 31'	Report	Lisman 43'; Bengtsson 56'

Cegeka Arena, Genk
Attendance: 12,913
Referee: Davide Massa (Italy)

Genk won 6–3 on aggregate.

21 August 2025
18:30

Midtjylland (Denmark)	4–0	(Finland) KuPS
Buksa 15'; Osorio 19'; Brumado 81', 90+1'	Report

MCH Arena, Herning
Attendance: 7,408
Referee: Srđan Jovanović (Serbia)
28 August 2025
17:00 (18:00 UTC+3)

KuPS (Finland)	0–2	(Denmark) Midtjylland
	Report	Brumado 51' (pen.); Şimşir 54'

Kuopio Football Stadium, Kuopio
Attendance: 1,734
Referee: Simone Sozza (Italy)

Midtjylland won 6–0 on aggregate.

21 August 2025
21:00 (20:00 UTC+1)

Lincoln Red Imps (Gibraltar)	0–4	(Portugal) Braga
	Report	Gómez 34'; Zalazar 39', 80'; Víctor 90+1'

Estádio Algarve, Faro/Loulé, Portugal (Note: Lincoln Red Imps played their play-off round home match at the Estádio Algarve in Faro/Loulé, Portugal, instead of their regular stadium, Victoria Stadium in Gibraltar, due to renovation works.)
Attendance: 1,988
Referee: Morten Krogh (Denmark)
28 August 2025
21:00 (20:00 UTC+1)

Braga (Portugal)	5–1	(Gibraltar) Lincoln Red Imps
Carvalho 12'; Martínez 41', 45+1'; Vidigal 77'; Víctor 82'	Report	Gómez 89'

Estádio Municipal, Braga
Attendance: 12,125
Referee: Erik Lambrechts (Belgium)

Braga won 9–1 on aggregate.

21 August 2025
20:00

Zrinjski Mostar (Bosnia and Herzegovina)	0–2	(Netherlands) Utrecht
	Report	Min 39' (pen.); Jensen 85'

Stadion pod Bijelim Brijegom, Mostar
Attendance: 4,400
Referee: Georgi Kabakov (Bulgaria)
28 August 2025
20:00

Utrecht (Netherlands)	0–0	(Bosnia and Herzegovina) Zrinjski Mostar
	Report

Stadion Galgenwaard, Utrecht
Attendance: 21,594
Referee: Benoît Bastien (France)

Utrecht won 2–0 on aggregate.

21 August 2025
19:00

Brann (Norway)	2–1	(Cyprus) AEK Larnaca
Myhre 20'; Torsvik 90+3'	Report	Angielski 16'

Brann Stadion, Bergen
Attendance: 14,750
Referee: Marco Guida (Italy)
27 August 2025
18:30 (19:30 UTC+3)

AEK Larnaca (Cyprus)	0–4	(Norway) Brann
	Report	Castro 45+1'; Hansen 69'; Knudsen 75'; Soltvedt 87'

AEK Arena – Georgios Karapatakis, Larnaca
Attendance: 4,665
Referee: Danny Makkelie (Netherlands)

Brann won 6–1 on aggregate.

21 August 2025
20:45

Rijeka (Croatia)	1–0	(Greece) PAOK
Menalo 39'	Report

Stadion Rujevica, Rijeka
Attendance: 6,882
Referee: Ivan Kružliak (Slovakia)
28 August 2025
19:30 (20:30 UTC+3)

PAOK (Greece)	5–0	(Croatia) Rijeka
Meïté 12'; Konstantelias 25'; Chalov 56'; Giakoumakis 77'; Pelkas 89'	Report

Toumba Stadium, Thessaloniki
Attendance: 24,223
Referee: José María Sánchez Martínez (Spain)

PAOK won 5–1 on aggregate.
