= 2025–26 UEFA Conference League =

European club football competition

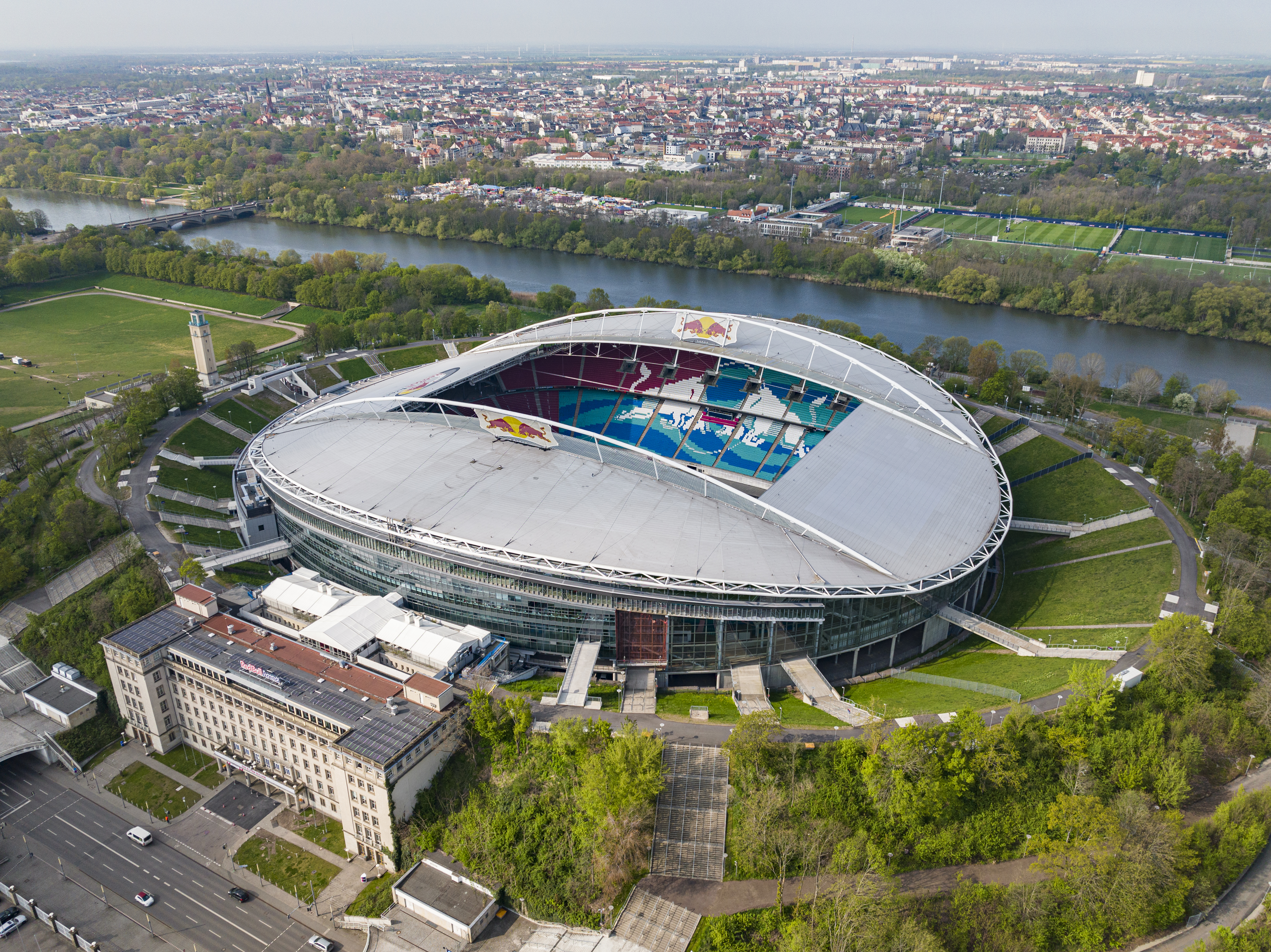
- The Red Bull Arena in Leipzig hosted the final

Tournament details
- Dates: Qualifying: 8 July – 28 August 2025; Competition proper: 2 October 2025 – 27 May 2026
- Teams: Competition proper: 24+12; Total: 109+55 (from 54 associations)

Final positions
- Champions: (England) Crystal Palace (1st title)
- Runners-up: (Spain) Rayo Vallecano

Tournament statistics
- Matches played: 153
- Goals scored: 379 (2.48 per match)
- Attendance: 1,924,546 (12,579 per match)
- Top scorer(s): (Senegal) Ismaïla Sarr (Crystal Palace); 9 goals
- Best player: (Senegal) Ismaïla Sarr (Crystal Palace)
- Best young player: (Netherlands) Kees Smit (AZ)

The 2025–26 UEFA Conference League was the fifth season of the UEFA Conference League, Europe's tertiary club football tournament organised by UEFA.

This was the second UEFA Conference League played under a new format involving a 36-team league phase. The new format also did not allow teams to transfer from the Europa League to the Conference League from the league phase onwards, and thus the Conference League titleholders (Chelsea) were unable to defend their title, as the winner of the Conference League automatically qualified for the Europa League league phase. However, Chelsea had already qualified for the 2025–26 UEFA Champions League league phase via their domestic league position prior to winning the Conference League, so the automatic berth in the Europa League was not required and the access list was rebalanced.

The final was played at the Red Bull Arena in Leipzig, Germany, between Crystal Palace and Rayo Vallecano, with Crystal Palace winning 1–0. As winners of the tournament, Crystal Palace automatically qualified for the 2026–27 UEFA Europa League league phase, as they did not qualify for the 2026–27 UEFA Champions League or Europa League through their league performance.

== Association team allocation ==
A total of 164 teams from 54 of the 55 UEFA member associations participated in the 2025–26 UEFA Conference League. The association ranking based on the UEFA association coefficients was used to determine the number of participating teams for each association:

- Associations 1–12 each had one team.
- Associations 13–33 and 51–55 (except Russia) each had two teams.
- Associations 34–50 each had three teams (except Liechtenstein, which had one).
- 15 teams eliminated from the 2025–26 UEFA Champions League and 41 teams eliminated from the 2025–26 UEFA Europa League were transferred to the Conference League.

=== Association ranking ===
For the 2025–26 UEFA Conference League, the associations were allocated places according to their 2024 UEFA association coefficients, which took into account their performance in European competitions from 2019–20 to 2023–24.

Apart from the allocation based on the association coefficients, associations could have additional teams participating in the Conference League, as noted below:

- (UCL) – Additional teams transferred from the UEFA Champions League
- (UEL) – Additional/vacated teams transferred from/to the UEFA Europa League

Association ranking for 2025–26 UEFA Conference League

Rank	Association	Coeff.	Teams	Notes
1	England	104.303	1	
2	Italy	90.284	1	
3	Spain	89.489	1	
4	Germany	86.624	1	
5	France	66.831	1	
6	Netherlands	61.300	1	
7	Portugal	56.316	1	
8	Belgium	48.800	1	+1 (UEL)
9	Turkey	38.600	1	+2 (UEL)
10	Czech Republic	36.050	1	+2 (UEL)
11	Scotland	36.050	1	+2 (UEL)
12	Switzerland	32.975	1	+2 (UEL)
13	Austria	32.600	2	+1 (UEL)
14	Norway	31.625	2	+1 (UEL)
15	Greece	31.525	2	
16	Denmark	31.450	2	
17	Israel	31.125	2	+1 (UEL)
18	Ukraine	28.000	2	+2 (UEL)
19	Serbia	27.775	2	+1 (UEL)

Rank	Association	Coeff.	Teams	Notes
20	Croatia	25.525	2	+1 (UEL)
21	Poland	25.375	2	+2 (UEL)
22	Russia	22.965	0	
23	Cyprus	22.100	2	+1 (UEL)
24	Hungary	21.875	2	+1 (UEL)
25	Sweden	21.500	2	+1 (UEL)
26	Romania	21.375	2	+1 (UEL)
27	Bulgaria	20.375	2	+1 (UEL)
28	Azerbaijan	20.125	2	+1 (UEL)
29	Slovakia	19.625	2	+2 (UEL)
30	Slovenia	13.250	2	+1 (UCL) +1 (UEL)
31	Moldova	13.125	2	+1 (UCL) +1 (UEL)
32	Kosovo	11.541	2	+2 (UEL)
33	Kazakhstan	11.500	2	+1 (UEL)
34	Finland	11.125	2	+2 (UEL)
35	Republic of Ireland	10.875	3	−1 +1 (UEL)
36	Armenia	10.625	3	+1 (UEL)

Rank	Association	Coeff.	Teams	Notes
37	Latvia	10.625	3	+1 (UEL)
38	Faroe Islands	10.375	3	+1 (UCL)
39	Bosnia and Herzegovina	10.000	3	+1 (UEL)
40	Liechtenstein	10.000	1	
41	Iceland	9.583	3	+1 (UEL)
42	Northern Ireland	9.208	3	+1 (UCL)
43	Luxembourg	8.625	3	+1 (UCL)
44	Lithuania	8.500	3	+1 (UCL)
45	Malta	8.250	3	+1 (UEL)
46	Georgia	7.625	3	+1 (UCL)
47	Albania	7.375	3	+1 (UCL)
48	Estonia	7.207	3	+1 (UCL)
49	Belarus	6.625	3	+1 (UCL)
50	North Macedonia	6.000	3	+1 (UEL)
51	Andorra	5.998	2	+1 (UCL)
52	Wales	5.791	2	+1 (UCL)
53	Montenegro	5.708	2	+1 (UCL)
54	Gibraltar	4.957	2	+1 (UEL)
55	San Marino	1.832	2	+1 (UCL)

=== Distribution ===
The following is the access list for this season.

		Teams entering in this round	Teams advancing from previous round	Teams transferred from Champions League	Teams transferred from Europa League
First qualifying round (48 teams)		8 domestic cup winners from associations 48–55; 20 domestic league runners-up from associations 34–55 (except Liechtenstein and Republic of Ireland); 20 domestic league third-placed teams from associations 30–50 (except Liechtenstein)			
Second qualifying round (100 teams)	Champions Path (12 teams)			12 teams eliminated from Champions League first qualifying round	
Second qualifying round (100 teams)	League Path (88 teams)	12 domestic cup winners from associations 35–47 (except Republic of Ireland); 18 domestic league runners-up from associations 16–33 (except Russia) and association 35; 16 domestic league third-placed teams from associations 13–29 (except Russia and Slovakia); 9 domestic league fourth-placed teams from associations 7–15; 1 domestic league fifth-placed team from association 6	24 winners from the first qualifying round		8 teams eliminated from Europa League first qualifying round
Third qualifying round (60 teams)	Champions Path (8 teams)		6 winners from the second qualifying round (Champions Path)	2 teams eliminated from Champions League first qualifying round	
Third qualifying round (60 teams)	League Path (52 teams)		44 winners from the second qualifying round (League Path)		8 teams eliminated from Europa League second qualifying round
Play-off round (48 teams)	Champions Path (10 teams)		4 winners from the third qualifying round (Champions Path)		6 teams eliminated from Europa League third qualifying round (Champions Path)
Play-off round (48 teams)	League Path (38 teams)	5 domestic league sixth-placed teams from associations 1–5 (EFL Cup winners for England)	26 winners from the third qualifying round (League Path)		7 teams eliminated from Europa League third qualifying round (League Path)
League phase (36 teams)			5 winners from the play-off round (Champions Path); 19 winners from the play-off round (League Path)		12 teams eliminated from Europa League play-off round
Knockout phase play-offs (16 teams)			16 teams ranked 9–24 from the league phase		
Round of 16 (16 teams)			8 teams ranked 1–8 from the league phase; 8 winners from the knockout phase play-offs		

The information here reflects the ongoing suspension of Russia in European football, and so the following changes to the default access list were made:

- The cup winners of associations 39 to 44 (Bosnia and Herzegovina, Liechtenstein, Iceland, Northern Ireland, Luxembourg and Lithuania) entered the second qualifying round instead of the first qualifying round.
- As a result of corresponding changes to the Champions League access list, there was one fewer loser from the Champions League first qualifying round transferred to the Conference League second qualifying round (Champions Path) so one transferred team received a bye to the third qualifying round (Champions Path).

As the Champions League title holders (Paris Saint-Germain) qualified for the Champions League via their domestic league's standard berth allocation, the following changes to the default access list were made:

- As a result of corresponding changes to the Champions League access list, there was one fewer loser from the Champions League first qualifying round (two fewer in total) transferred to the Conference League second qualifying round (Champions Path), so one transferred team (two in total) received a bye to the third qualifying round (Champions Path).

As the Conference League title holders (Chelsea) qualified for the Champions League phase via their domestic league's standard berth allocation, the following changes to the default access list were made:

- The cup winners of association 34 (Finland) entered the Europa League first qualifying round instead of the second qualifying round.
- The cup winners of associations 45 (Malta) and 46 (Georgia) entered the second qualifying round instead of the first qualifying round.

=== Teams ===
The labels in the parentheses show how each team qualified for the place of its starting round:

- CW: Domestic cup winners
- 2nd, 3rd, 4th, 5th, 6th, etc.: League position of the previous season
- LC: League cup winners
- RW: Regular season winners
- PW: End-of-season Conference League play-offs winners
- CL: Transferred from the Champions League
  - Q1: Losers from the first qualifying round
- EL: Transferred from the Europa League
  - PO: Losers from the play-off round
  - CH/MP Q3: Losers from the third qualifying round (Champions/Main Path)
  - Q2: Losers from the second qualifying round
  - Q1: Losers from the first qualifying round

The second qualifying round, third qualifying round and play-off round were divided into Champions Path (CH) and Main Path (MP).

Qualified teams for 2025–26 UEFA Conference League
Entry round		Teams			
League phase		(Turkey) Samsunspor (EL PO)	(Czech Republic) Sigma Olomouc (EL PO)	(Scotland) Aberdeen (EL PO)	(Ukraine) Dynamo Kyiv (EL PO)
League phase		(Croatia) Rijeka (EL PO)	(Poland) Lech Poznań (EL PO)	(Cyprus) AEK Larnaca (EL PO)	(Slovakia) Slovan Bratislava (EL PO)
League phase		(Finland) KuPS (EL PO)	(Bosnia and Herzegovina) Zrinjski Mostar (EL PO)	(North Macedonia) Shkëndija (EL PO)	(Gibraltar) Lincoln Red Imps (EL PO)
Play-off round	CH	(Kosovo) Drita (EL CH Q3)	(Republic of Ireland) Shelbourne (EL CH Q3)	(Armenia) Noah (EL CH Q3)	(Latvia) RFS (EL CH Q3)
Play-off round	CH	(Iceland) Breiðablik (EL CH Q3)	(Malta) Hamrun Spartans (EL CH Q3)		
Play-off round	MP	(England) Crystal Palace (CW)	(Italy) Fiorentina (6th)	(Spain) Rayo Vallecano (8th)	(Germany) Mainz 05 (6th)
Play-off round	MP	(France) Strasbourg (7th)	(Switzerland) Servette (EL MP Q3)	(Austria) Wolfsberger AC (EL MP Q3)	(Norway) Fredrikstad (EL MP Q3)
Play-off round	MP	(Ukraine) Shakhtar Donetsk (EL MP Q3)	(Poland) Legia Warsaw (EL MP Q3)	(Sweden) BK Häcken (EL MP Q3)	(Romania) CFR Cluj (EL MP Q3)
Third qualifying round	CH	(Faroe Islands) Víkingur Gøta (CL Q1)	(San Marino) Virtus (CL Q1)		
Third qualifying round	MP	(Belgium) Anderlecht (EL Q2)	(Turkey) Beşiktaş (EL Q2)	(Czech Republic) Baník Ostrava (EL Q2)	(Scotland) Hibernian (EL Q2)
Third qualifying round	MP	(Switzerland) Lugano (EL Q2)	(Bulgaria) Levski Sofia (EL Q2)	(Slovenia) Celje (EL Q2)	(Moldova) Sheriff Tiraspol (EL Q2)
Second qualifying round	CH	(Slovenia) Olimpija Ljubljana (CL Q1)	(Moldova) Milsami Orhei (CL Q1)	(Northern Ireland) Linfield (CL Q1)	(Luxembourg) Differdange 03 (CL Q1)
Second qualifying round	CH	(Lithuania) Žalgiris (CL Q1)	(Georgia (country)) Iberia 1999 (CL Q1)	(Albania) Egnatia (CL Q1)	(Estonia) FCI Levadia (CL Q1)
Second qualifying round	CH	(Belarus) Dinamo Minsk (CL Q1)	(Andorra) Inter Club d'Escaldes (CL Q1)	(Wales) The New Saints (CL Q1)	(Montenegro) Budućnost Podgorica (CL Q1)
Second qualifying round	MP	(Israel) Hapoel Be'er Sheva (EL Q1)	(Serbia) Partizan (EL Q1)	(Hungary) Paks (EL Q1)	(Azerbaijan) Sabah (EL Q1)
Second qualifying round	MP	(Slovakia) Spartak Trnava (EL Q1)	(Kosovo) Prishtina (EL Q1)	(Kazakhstan) Aktobe (EL Q1)	(Finland) Ilves (EL Q1)
Second qualifying round	MP	(Netherlands) AZ (PW)	(Portugal) Santa Clara (5th)	(Belgium) Charleroi (PW)	(Turkey) İstanbul Başakşehir (5th)
Second qualifying round	MP	(Czech Republic) Sparta Prague (4th)	(Scotland) Dundee United (4th)	(Switzerland) Lausanne-Sport (5th)	Austria Wien (3rd)
Second qualifying round	MP	(Austria) Rapid Wien (PW)	(Norway) Viking (3rd)	(Norway) Rosenborg (4th)	(Greece) AEK Athens (4th)
Second qualifying round	MP	(Greece) Aris (5th)	(Denmark) Brøndby (3rd)	(Denmark) Silkeborg (PW)	(Israel) Maccabi Haifa (3rd)
Second qualifying round	MP	(Israel) Beitar Jerusalem (4th)	(Ukraine) Oleksandriya (2nd)	(Ukraine) Polissya Zhytomyr (4th)	(Serbia) Novi Pazar (3rd)
Second qualifying round	MP	(Serbia) Radnički 1923 (5th)	(Croatia) Hajduk Split (3rd)	(Croatia) Varaždin (4th)	(Poland) Raków Częstochowa (2nd)
Second qualifying round	MP	(Poland) Jagiellonia Białystok (3rd)	(Cyprus) Aris Limassol (2nd)	(Cyprus) Omonia (3rd)	(Hungary) Puskás Akadémia (2nd)
Second qualifying round	MP	(Hungary) Győri ETO (4th)	(Sweden) Hammarby IF (2nd)	(Sweden) AIK (3rd)	(Romania) Universitatea Craiova (3rd)
Second qualifying round	MP	(Romania) Universitatea Cluj (4th)	(Bulgaria) Cherno More (3rd)	(Bulgaria) Arda (PW)	(Azerbaijan) Zira (2nd)
Second qualifying round	MP	(Azerbaijan) Araz-Naxçıvan (3rd)	(Slovakia) Žilina (2nd)	(Slovakia) Košice (5th)	(Slovenia) Maribor (2nd)
Second qualifying round	MP	(Moldova) Zimbru Chișinău (3rd)	(Kosovo) Ballkani (2nd)	(Kazakhstan) Astana (2nd)	(Republic of Ireland) Shamrock Rovers (2nd)
Second qualifying round	MP	Ararat-Armenia (2nd)	(Latvia) Riga (2nd)	(Faroe Islands) HB (CW)	(Bosnia and Herzegovina) Sarajevo (CW)
Second qualifying round	MP	(Liechtenstein) Vaduz (CW)	(Iceland) KA (CW)	(Northern Ireland) Dungannon Swifts (CW)	(Luxembourg) UNA Strassen (2nd)
Second qualifying round	MP	(Lithuania) Banga (CW)	(Malta) Hibernians (CW)	(Georgia (country)) Spaeri (CW)	(Albania) Dinamo City (CW)
First qualifying round		(Slovenia) Koper (3rd)	(Moldova) Petrocub Hîncești (4th)	(Kosovo) Malisheva (3rd)	(Kazakhstan) Ordabasy (4th)
First qualifying round		(Finland) HJK (3rd)	(Finland) SJK (PW)	(Republic of Ireland) St Patrick's Athletic (3rd)	(Armenia) Urartu (3rd)
First qualifying round		(Armenia) Pyunik (4th)	(Latvia) Auda (3rd)	(Latvia) Daugavpils (5th)	(Faroe Islands) KÍ (2nd)
First qualifying round		(Faroe Islands) NSÍ (4th)	(Bosnia and Herzegovina) Borac Banja Luka (2nd)	(Bosnia and Herzegovina) Željezničar (4th)	(Iceland) Víkingur Reykjavík (2nd)
First qualifying round		(Iceland) Valur (3rd)	(Northern Ireland) Larne (2nd)	(Northern Ireland) Cliftonville (PW)	(Luxembourg) F91 Dudelange (3rd)
First qualifying round		(Luxembourg) Racing Union (4th)	(Lithuania) Hegelmann (2nd)	(Lithuania) Kauno Žalgiris (3rd)	(Malta) Birkirkara (2nd)
First qualifying round		(Malta) Floriana (3rd)	(Georgia (country)) Torpedo Kutaisi (2nd)	(Georgia (country)) Dila Gori (3rd)	(Albania) Vllaznia (2nd)
First qualifying round		(Albania) Partizani (3rd)	(Estonia) Nõmme Kalju (CW)	(Estonia) Paide Linnameeskond (3rd)	(Estonia) Flora (4th)
First qualifying round		(Belarus) Neman Grodno (CW)	(Belarus) Torpedo-BelAZ Zhodino (3rd)	(Belarus) Dynamo Brest (4th)	(North Macedonia) Vardar (CW)
First qualifying round		(North Macedonia) Sileks (2nd)	(North Macedonia) Rabotnicki (3rd)	(Andorra) Atlètic Club d'Escaldes (2nd)	(Andorra) FC Santa Coloma (3rd)
First qualifying round		(Wales) Penybont (2nd)	(Wales) Haverfordwest County (PW)	(Montenegro) Dečić (CW)	(Montenegro) Sutjeska (3rd)
First qualifying round		(Gibraltar) Magpies (CW)	(Gibraltar) St Joseph's (2nd)	(San Marino) La Fiorita (PW)	(San Marino) Tre Fiori (3rd)

Two teams not playing in a national top division took part in the competition: Vaduz (2nd tier) and Spaeri (2nd tier).

Notes

1. Champions League (UCL Q1): Two of the Champions League first qualifying round losers were drawn to receive byes to the third qualifying round (Champions Path), as two fewer losers were transferred to the second qualifying round (Champions Path), due to Champions League league phase berths vacated following the Champions League title holders qualifying via league position and the suspension of Russia from the 2025–26 European season.
2. England (ENG): Initially, Crystal Palace qualified for the Europa League as the winners of the 2024–25 FA Cup and Nottingham Forest qualified for the Conference League as the seventh-placed team in the Premier League. However, on 11 July, UEFA ruled that Crystal Palace and French club Lyon (who also qualified for the Europa League) were both part of a group owned by the same company (prior to 1 March 2025) and as such could not compete in the same competition. As Lyon finished higher in their domestic league, Crystal Palace were forced to swap European rights with Nottingham Forest. Crystal Palace's place in the Conference League was confirmed when their appeal was rejected by the Court of Arbitration for Sport on 11 August.
3. Gibraltar (GIB): FCB Magpies, who qualified by winning the 2024–25 Rock Cup, merged into Calpe City Magpies on 1 June 2025, but played as Magpies during the 2025–26 season due to registration issues.
4. Latvia (LVA): Valmiera finished fourth in the 2024 Latvian Higher League, but were disqualified and expelled from the league outright. In addition, the club was also disqualified from all European competitions including the Conference League. As a result, their place in the competition was passed on to the fifth-placed team, Daugavpils.
5. Liechtenstein (LIE): The seven teams affiliated with the Liechtenstein Football Association (LFV) all played in the Swiss football league system. The only competition organised by the LFV was the Liechtenstein Football Cup – the winners of which qualified for the UEFA Conference League for the 2025–26 season.
6. Montenegro (MNE): Petrovac would have qualified for the first qualifying round by finishing second, but failed to obtain a UEFA licence. As a result, their berth was passed onto the third-placed side, Sutjeska.
7. Republic of Ireland (IRL): Drogheda United qualified for the second qualifying round as the 2024 FAI Cup winners. They were expelled from the competition as their owners, Trivela Group, also owned Danish club Silkeborg, and Silkeborg finished in a higher league position than Drogheda did. No Irish club was able to replace them as the deadline for a UEFA licence had passed. Second-placed Shamrock Rovers moved from the first qualifying round to the second qualifying round to replace Drogheda United. With an odd number of teams in the first qualifying round as a result, the next-highest cup winner, Dinamo City from Albania, also moved up.
8. Russia (RUS): On 28 February 2022, Russian football clubs and national teams were suspended from FIFA and UEFA competitions due to the Russian invasion of Ukraine. The tables reflect Russia's ongoing suspension from UEFA competitions.
9. Serbia (SRB): OFK Beograd qualified for the second qualifying round but failed to obtain a UEFA licence. As a result, the berth was given to fifth-placed Radnički.
10. Slovakia (SVK): DAC Dunajská Streda originally qualified for the second qualifying round but were later excluded by UEFA due to multi-club ownership rules, because Győr (Hungary) also qualified. Both teams finished fourth in their leagues, but DAC Dunajská Streda were removed due to Slovakia's lower position in the UEFA standings. Initially, UEFA cancelled DAC Dunajska Streda's second qualifying round tie, meaning whoever won first qualifying round match 20 would have received a bye to the third qualifying round. However, Košice, the next highest-placed team of the Slovak league, replaced DAC Dunajská Streda on 15 July, in time to participate in the second qualifying round.

== Schedule ==
The schedule of the competition was as follows. Matches were scheduled for Thursdays, with an exclusive day of 18 December, apart from the final, which took place on a Wednesday, though exceptionally could take place on Tuesdays or Wednesdays due to scheduling conflicts.

Schedule for 2025–26 UEFA Conference League
Phase	Round	Draw date	First leg	Second leg
Qualifying	First qualifying round	17 June 2025	10 July 2025	17 July 2025
Qualifying	Second qualifying round	18 June 2025	24 July 2025	31 July 2025
Qualifying	Third qualifying round	21 July 2025	7 August 2025	14 August 2025
Play-offs	Play-off round	4 August 2025	21 August 2025	28 August 2025
League phase	Matchday 1	29 August 2025	2 October 2025	
League phase	Matchday 2	29 August 2025	23 October 2025	
League phase	Matchday 3	29 August 2025	6 November 2025	
League phase	Matchday 4	29 August 2025	27 November 2025	
League phase	Matchday 5	29 August 2025	11 December 2025	
League phase	Matchday 6	29 August 2025	18 December 2025	
Knockout phase	Knockout phase play-offs	16 January 2026	19 February 2026	26 February 2026
Knockout phase	Round of 16	27 February 2026	12 March 2026	19 March 2026
Knockout phase	Quarter-finals	—N/a	9 April 2026	16 April 2026
Knockout phase	Semi-finals	—N/a	30 April 2026	7 May 2026
Knockout phase	Final	—N/a	27 May 2026 at Red Bull Arena, Leipzig	

== Qualifying rounds ==
=== First qualifying round ===
The draw for the first qualifying round was held on 17 June 2025. The first legs were played on 8 and 10 July, and the second legs were played on 16 and 17 July 2025.

The winners of the ties advanced to the second qualifying round.

First qualifying round
Team 1	Agg.	Team 2	1st leg	2nd leg
NSÍ (Faroe Islands)	4–5	(Finland) HJK	4–0	0–5 (a.e.t.)
Torpedo Kutaisi (Georgia (country))	5–4	(Kazakhstan) Ordabasy	4–3	1–1
Željezničar (Bosnia and Herzegovina)	2–4	(Slovenia) Koper	1–1	1–3
SJK (Finland)	1–4	(Faroe Islands) KÍ	1–2	0–2
Nõmme Kalju (Estonia)	2–1	(Albania) Partizani	1–1	1–0 (a.e.t.)
Tre Fiori (San Marino)	1–5	(Armenia) Pyunik	1–0	0–5
St Patrick's Athletic (Republic of Ireland)	3–0	(Lithuania) Hegelmann	1–0	2–0
Dečić (Montenegro)	3–2	(North Macedonia) Sileks	2–0	1–2
Sutjeska (Montenegro)	3–2	(Belarus) Dynamo Brest	1–2	2–0
Larne (Northern Ireland)	2–2 (4–2 p)	(Latvia) Auda	0–0	2–2 (a.e.t.)
Floriana (Malta)	5–3	(Wales) Haverfordwest County	2–1	3–2
Torpedo-BelAZ Zhodino (Belarus)	4–0	(North Macedonia) Rabotnicki	3–0	1–0
Magpies (Gibraltar)	3–7	(Estonia) Paide Linnameeskond	2–3	1–4
Birkirkara (Malta)	1–3	(Moldova) Petrocub Hîncești	1–0	0–3
Atlètic Club d'Escaldes (Andorra)	5–2	(Luxembourg) F91 Dudelange	2–0	3–2
Valur (Iceland)	5–1	(Estonia) Flora	3–0	2–1
Malisheva (Kosovo)	0–9	(Iceland) Víkingur Reykjavík	0–1	0–8
Racing Union (Luxembourg)	1–3	(Georgia (country)) Dila Gori	1–2	0–1
Vllaznia (Albania)	4–3	(Latvia) Daugavpils	0–1	4–2
Urartu (Armenia)	1–6	(Belarus) Neman Grodno	1–2	0–4
Vardar (North Macedonia)	5–2 (Note: Order of legs reversed after original draw.)	(San Marino) La Fiorita	3–0	2–2
Kauno Žalgiris (Lithuania)	4–1	(Wales) Penybont	3–0	1–1
St Joseph's (Gibraltar)	5–4	(Northern Ireland) Cliftonville	2–2	3–2 (a.e.t.)
Borac Banja Luka (Bosnia and Herzegovina)	3–4	(Andorra) FC Santa Coloma	1–4	2–0

=== Second qualifying round ===
The draw for the second qualifying round was held on 18 June 2025. The first legs were played on 22, 23 and 24 July, and the second legs were played on 29 and 31 July 2025.

The winners of the ties advanced to the third qualifying round.

Second qualifying round
Team 1	Agg.	Team 2	1st leg	2nd leg
Champions Path
Víkingur Gøta (Faroe Islands)	Bye	N/A	—	—
Virtus (San Marino)	Bye	N/A	—	—
FCI Levadia (Estonia)	3–2	(Georgia (country)) Iberia 1999	1–0	2–2 (a.e.t.)
Žalgiris (Lithuania)	0–2	(Northern Ireland) Linfield	0–0	0–2
The New Saints (Wales)	0–2	(Luxembourg) Differdange 03	0–1	0–1
Olimpija Ljubljana (Slovenia)	5–3	(Andorra) Inter Club d'Escaldes	4–2	1–1
Budućnost Podgorica (Montenegro)	1–2	(Moldova) Milsami Orhei	0–0	1–2
Dinamo Minsk (Belarus)	0–3	(Albania) Egnatia	0–2	0–1
Main Path
Dundee United (Scotland)	2–0	(Luxembourg) UNA Strassen	1–0	1–0
Larne (Northern Ireland)	1–1 (5–4 p)	(Kosovo) Prishtina	0–0	1–1 (a.e.t.)
Košice (Slovakia)	3–4	(Belarus) Neman Grodno	2–3	1–1
Vaduz (Liechtenstein)	3–1	(Northern Ireland) Dungannon Swifts	0–1	3–0 (a.e.t.)
Silkeborg (Denmark)	4–3	(Iceland) KA	1–1	3–2 (a.e.t.)
Rosenborg (Norway)	7–0	(Lithuania) Banga	5–0	2–0
Atlètic Club d'Escaldes (Andorra)	2–3	(Albania) Dinamo City	1–2	1–1
Austria Wien	7–0	(Georgia (country)) Spaeri	2–0	5–0
Ballkani (Kosovo)	5–3	(Malta) Floriana	4–2	1–1
Viking (Norway)	12–3	(Slovenia) Koper	7–0	5–3
AEK Athens (Greece)	1–0	(Israel) Hapoel Be'er Sheva	1–0	0–0
Pyunik (Armenia)	3–4	(Hungary) Győri ETO	2–1	1–3
Riga (Latvia)	5–4	(Georgia (country)) Dila Gori	2–1	3–3
Raków Częstochowa (Poland)	6–1	(Slovakia) Žilina	3–0	3–1
Petrocub Hîncești (Moldova)	1–6	(Azerbaijan) Sabah	0–2	1–4
Ararat-Armenia	2–1	(Romania) Universitatea Cluj	0–0	2–1 (a.e.t.)
Varaždin (Croatia)	2–3	(Portugal) Santa Clara	2–1	0–2
Kauno Žalgiris (Lithuania)	3–2	(Iceland) Valur	1–1	2–1
Paks (Hungary)	2–1	(Slovenia) Maribor	1–0	1–1
Vllaznia (Albania)	4–5	(Iceland) Víkingur Reykjavík	2–1	2–4 (a.e.t.)
Hammarby IF (Sweden)	2–1	(Belgium) Charleroi	0–0	2–1 (a.e.t.)
Radnički 1923 (Serbia)	0–1	(Faroe Islands) KÍ	0–0	0–1
Novi Pazar (Serbia)	2–5	(Poland) Jagiellonia Białystok	1–2	1–3
Polissya Zhytomyr (Ukraine)	5–3	(Andorra) FC Santa Coloma	1–2	4–1
Vardar (North Macedonia)	2–6	(Switzerland) Lausanne-Sport	2–1	0–5
HB (Faroe Islands)	1–2	(Denmark) Brøndby	1–1	0–1
Oleksandriya (Ukraine)	0–6	(Serbia) Partizan	0–2	0–4
Hibernians (Malta)	2–7	(Slovakia) Spartak Trnava	1–2	1–5
St Patrick's Athletic (Republic of Ireland)	3–2	(Estonia) Nõmme Kalju	1–0	2–2 (a.e.t.)
Paide Linnameeskond (Estonia)	0–8 (Note: Order of legs reversed after original draw.)	(Sweden) AIK	0–2	0–6
Sarajevo (Bosnia and Herzegovina)	2–5	(Romania) Universitatea Craiova	2–1	0–4
Aris Limassol (Cyprus)	5–2	(Hungary) Puskás Akadémia	3–2	2–0
St Joseph's (Gibraltar)	0–4	(Republic of Ireland) Shamrock Rovers	0–4	0–0
Ilves (Finland)	4–8	(Netherlands) AZ	4–3	0–5
Zira (Azerbaijan)	2–3	(Croatia) Hajduk Split	1–1	1–2 (a.e.t.)
Arda (Bulgaria)	2–2 (4–3 p)	(Finland) HJK	0–0	2–2 (a.e.t.)
Aktobe (Kazakhstan)	2–5	(Czech Republic) Sparta Prague	2–1	0–4
Astana (Kazakhstan)	3–1	(Moldova) Zimbru Chișinău	1–1	2–0
Dečić (Montenegro)	2–6	(Austria) Rapid Wien	0–2	2–4
Torpedo-BelAZ Zhodino (Belarus)	1–4	(Israel) Maccabi Haifa	1–1	0–3
Araz-Naxçıvan (Azerbaijan)	4–3	(Greece) Aris	2–1	2–2
Omonia (Cyprus)	5–0	(Georgia (country)) Torpedo Kutaisi	1–0	4–0
Cherno More (Bulgaria)	0–5	(Turkey) İstanbul Başakşehir	0–1	0–4
Sutjeska (Montenegro)	3–7	(Israel) Beitar Jerusalem	1–2	2–5

=== Third qualifying round ===
The draw for the third qualifying round was held on 21 July 2025. The first legs were played on 5 and 7 August, and the second legs were played on 13 and 14 August 2025.

Third qualifying round
Team 1	Agg.	Team 2	1st leg	2nd leg
Champions Path
Olimpija Ljubljana (Slovenia)	4–2	(Albania) Egnatia	0–0	4–2 (a.e.t.)
Milsami Orhei (Moldova)	3–5	(San Marino) Virtus	3–2	0–3
Differdange 03 (Luxembourg)	5–4	(Estonia) FCI Levadia	2–3	3–1 (a.e.t.)
Víkingur Gøta (Faroe Islands)	2–3	(Northern Ireland) Linfield	2–1	0–2
Main Path
Rapid Wien (Austria)	4–4 (5–4 p)	(Scotland) Dundee United	2–2	2–2 (a.e.t.)
Sparta Prague (Czech Republic)	6–2	Ararat-Armenia	4–1	2–1
AZ (Netherlands)	4–0	(Liechtenstein) Vaduz	3–0	1–0
Lugano (Switzerland)	4–7	(Slovenia) Celje	0–5	4–2
KÍ (Faroe Islands)	2–2 (4–5 p)	(Belarus) Neman Grodno	2–0	0–2 (a.e.t.)
Riga (Latvia)	4–3	(Israel) Beitar Jerusalem	3–0	1–3
Víkingur Reykjavík (Iceland)	3–4	(Denmark) Brøndby	3–0	0–4
Hajduk Split (Croatia)	3–4	(Albania) Dinamo City	2–1	1–3 (a.e.t.)
Anderlecht (Belgium)	4–1	(Moldova) Sheriff Tiraspol	3–0	1–1
Lausanne-Sport (Switzerland)	5–1	(Kazakhstan) Astana	3–1	2–0
Larne (Northern Ireland)	0–3	(Portugal) Santa Clara	0–3	0–0
Aris Limassol (Cyprus)	3–5	(Greece) AEK Athens	2–2	1–3 (a.e.t.)
Viking (Norway)	2–4	(Turkey) İstanbul Başakşehir	1–3	1–1
Araz-Naxçıvan (Azerbaijan)	0–9	(Cyprus) Omonia	0–4	0–5
Ballkani (Kosovo)	1–4	(Republic of Ireland) Shamrock Rovers	1–0	0–4
Raków Częstochowa (Poland)	2–1	(Israel) Maccabi Haifa	0–1	2–0
AIK (Sweden)	2–3	(Hungary) Győri ETO	2–1	0–2
Universitatea Craiova (Romania)	6–4	(Slovakia) Spartak Trnava	3–0	3–4 (a.e.t.)
Polissya Zhytomyr (Ukraine)	4–2	(Hungary) Paks	3–0	1–2
Levski Sofia (Bulgaria)	3–0	(Azerbaijan) Sabah	1–0	2–0
Silkeborg (Denmark)	2–3	(Poland) Jagiellonia Białystok	0–1	2–2
Partizan (Serbia)	3–4	(Scotland) Hibernian	0–2	3–2 (a.e.t.)
Baník Ostrava (Czech Republic)	5–4	Austria Wien	4–3	1–1
Rosenborg (Norway)	1–0	(Sweden) Hammarby IF	0–0	1–0
St Patrick's Athletic (Republic of Ireland)	3–7	(Turkey) Beşiktaş	1–4	2–3
Kauno Žalgiris (Lithuania)	0–3	(Bulgaria) Arda	0–1	0–2

== Play-off round ==
The draw for the play-off round was held on 4 August 2025. The first legs were played on 21 August, and the second legs were played on 27 and 28 August 2025.

Play-off round
Team 1	Agg.	Team 2	1st leg	2nd leg
Champions Path
Hamrun Spartans (Malta)	3–2	(Latvia) RFS	1–0	2–2
Shelbourne (Republic of Ireland)	5–1	(Northern Ireland) Linfield	3–1	2–0
Breiðablik (Iceland)	5–2	(San Marino) Virtus	2–1	3–1
Drita (Kosovo)	3–1	(Luxembourg) Differdange 03	2–1	1–0
Olimpija Ljubljana (Slovenia)	3–7	(Armenia) Noah	1–4	2–3
Main Path
Strasbourg (France)	3–2	(Denmark) Brøndby	0–0	3–2
Jagiellonia Białystok (Poland)	4–1	(Albania) Dinamo City	3–0	1–1
Shakhtar Donetsk (Ukraine)	3–2	(Switzerland) Servette	1–1	2–1 (a.e.t.)
Anderlecht (Belgium)	1–3	(Greece) AEK Athens	1–1	0–2
İstanbul Başakşehir (Turkey)	2–5	(Romania) Universitatea Craiova	1–2	1–3
Crystal Palace (England)	1–0	(Norway) Fredrikstad	1–0	0–0
Celje (Slovenia)	3–0	(Czech Republic) Baník Ostrava	1–0	2–0
Raków Częstochowa (Poland)	3–1	(Bulgaria) Arda	1–0	2–1
Hibernian (Scotland)	4–5	(Poland) Legia Warsaw	1–2	3–3 (a.e.t.)
Levski Sofia (Bulgaria)	1–6	(Netherlands) AZ	0–2	1–4
Polissya Zhytomyr (Ukraine)	2–6	(Italy) Fiorentina	0–3	2–3
Győri ETO (Hungary)	2–3	(Austria) Rapid Wien	2–1	0–2
Neman Grodno (Belarus)	0–5	(Spain) Rayo Vallecano	0–1	0–4
Lausanne-Sport (Switzerland)	2–1	(Turkey) Beşiktaş	1–1	1–0
Santa Clara (Portugal)	1–2	(Republic of Ireland) Shamrock Rovers	1–2	0–0
Rosenborg (Norway)	3–5	(Germany) Mainz 05	2–1	1–4
Sparta Prague (Czech Republic)	2–1	(Latvia) Riga	2–0	0–1
BK Häcken (Sweden)	7–3	(Romania) CFR Cluj	7–2	0–1
Wolfsberger AC (Austria)	2–2 (4–5 p)	(Cyprus) Omonia	2–1	0–1 (a.e.t.)

== League phase ==
Location of teams in the 2025–26 UEFA Conference League league phase

The Conference League league phase comprised the 24 winners of the Conference League play-off round, as well as 12 losers of the Europa League play-off round.

The league phase draw for the 2025–26 UEFA Conference League took place at the Grimaldi Forum in Monaco on 29 August 2025. The 36 teams were divided into six pots of six teams each based on their UEFA club coefficient.

The draw ceremony was held along with the league phase draw for the 2025–26 UEFA Europa League, as a change from the previous season. In the previous season's draw the 36 teams were manually drawn one at a time; this season's draw was entirely computer generated with all 36 teams' opponents and home/away locations drawn at once, but revealed pot by pot. Each team faced one opponent from each of the six pots, with one home and one away match from each pot pair of Pots 1 and 2, Pots 3 and 4, and Pots 5 and 6. Teams could not face opponents from their own association, and could only be drawn against a maximum of two sides from the same association.

Crystal Palace, Drita, Hamrun Spartans, KuPS, Rayo Vallecano, Samsunspor, Shelbourne, Shkëndija, Sigma Olomouc and Universitatea Craiova made their debut appearances in a major UEFA competition group or league phase. Hamrun Spartans were the first team from Malta to play in a major UEFA competition group stage or league phase.

A total of 29 national associations were represented in the league phase. Poland were the first country to have four clubs play in the Conference League group stage/league phase, and it was also the first time in history that four Polish clubs competed in any edition of a UEFA competition group stage or league phase.

=== Table ===
The top eight ranked teams received a bye directly to the round of 16. Teams ranked from 9th to 24th contested the knockout phase play-offs, with the teams ranked from 9th to 16th seeded for the draw, while those ranked 17th to 24th were not. Teams ranked from 25th to 36th were eliminated from European competition.

Pos	Team	Pld	W	D	L	GF	GA	GD	Pts	Qualification
1	(French Football Federation) Strasbourg	6	5	1	0	11	5	+6	16	Advance to round of 16 (seeded)
2	(Polish Football Association) Raków Częstochowa	6	4	2	0	9	2	+7	14	Advance to round of 16 (seeded)
3	(Hellenic Football Federation) AEK Athens	6	4	1	1	14	7	+7	13	Advance to round of 16 (seeded)
4	(Football Association of the Czech Republic) Sparta Prague	6	4	1	1	10	3	+7	13	Advance to round of 16 (seeded)
5	(Royal Spanish Football Federation) Rayo Vallecano	6	4	1	1	13	7	+6	13	Advance to round of 16 (seeded)
6	(Ukrainian Association of Football) Shakhtar Donetsk	6	4	1	1	10	5	+5	13	Advance to round of 16 (seeded)
7	(German Football Association) Mainz 05	6	4	1	1	7	3	+4	13	Advance to round of 16 (seeded)
8	(Cyprus Football Association) AEK Larnaca	6	3	3	0	7	1	+6	12	Advance to round of 16 (seeded)
9	(Swiss Football Association) Lausanne-Sport	6	3	2	1	6	3	+3	11	Advance to knockout phase play-offs (seeded)
10	(The Football Association) Crystal Palace	6	3	1	2	11	6	+5	10	Advance to knockout phase play-offs (seeded)
11	(Polish Football Association) Lech Poznań	6	3	1	2	12	8	+4	10	Advance to knockout phase play-offs (seeded)
12	(Turkish Football Federation) Samsunspor	6	3	1	2	10	6	+4	10	Advance to knockout phase play-offs (seeded)
13	(Football Association of Slovenia) Celje	6	3	1	2	8	7	+1	10	Advance to knockout phase play-offs (seeded)
14	(Royal Dutch Football Association) AZ	6	3	1	2	7	7	0	10	Advance to knockout phase play-offs (seeded)
15	(Italian Football Federation) Fiorentina	6	3	0	3	8	5	+3	9	Advance to knockout phase play-offs (seeded)
16	(Croatian Football Federation) Rijeka	6	2	3	1	5	2	+3	9	Advance to knockout phase play-offs (seeded)
17	(Polish Football Association) Jagiellonia Białystok	6	2	3	1	5	4	+1	9	Advance to knockout phase play-offs (unseeded)
18	(Cyprus Football Association) Omonia	6	2	2	2	5	4	+1	8	Advance to knockout phase play-offs (unseeded)
19	(Football Federation of Armenia) Noah	6	2	2	2	6	7	−1	8	Advance to knockout phase play-offs (unseeded)
20	(Football Federation of Kosovo) Drita	6	2	2	2	4	8	−4	8	Advance to knockout phase play-offs (unseeded)
21	(Football Association of Finland) KuPS	6	1	4	1	6	5	+1	7	Advance to knockout phase play-offs (unseeded)
22	(Football Federation of Macedonia) Shkëndija	6	2	1	3	4	5	−1	7	Advance to knockout phase play-offs (unseeded)
23	(Football Association of Bosnia and Herzegovina) Zrinjski Mostar	6	2	1	3	8	10	−2	7	Advance to knockout phase play-offs (unseeded)
24	(Football Association of the Czech Republic) Sigma Olomouc	6	2	1	3	7	9	−2	7	Advance to knockout phase play-offs (unseeded)
25	(Romanian Football Federation) Universitatea Craiova	6	2	1	3	6	8	−2	7	
26	(Gibraltar Football Association) Lincoln Red Imps	6	2	1	3	7	15	−8	7	
27	(Ukrainian Association of Football) Dynamo Kyiv	6	2	0	4	9	9	0	6	
28	(Polish Football Association) Legia Warsaw	6	2	0	4	8	8	0	6	
29	(Slovak Football Association) Slovan Bratislava	6	2	0	4	5	9	−4	6	
30	(Football Association of Iceland) Breiðablik	6	1	2	3	6	11	−5	5	
31	(Football Association of Ireland) Shamrock Rovers	6	1	1	4	7	13	−6	4	
32	(Swedish Football Association) BK Häcken	6	0	3	3	5	8	−3	3	
33	(Malta Football Association) Hamrun Spartans	6	1	0	5	4	11	−7	3	
34	(Football Association of Ireland) Shelbourne	6	0	2	4	0	7	−7	2	
35	(Scottish Football Association) Aberdeen	6	0	2	4	3	14	−11	2	
36	(Austrian Football Association) Rapid Wien	6	0	1	5	3	14	−11	1	

Source: UEFA
Rules for classification: League phase tiebreakers

=== Results ===
Matchday 1
Home team	Score	Away team
Dynamo Kyiv (Ukraine)	0–2	(England) Crystal Palace
Lausanne-Sport (Switzerland)	3–0	(Iceland) Breiðablik
Noah (Armenia)	1–0	(Croatia) Rijeka
Zrinjski Mostar (Bosnia and Herzegovina)	5–0	(Gibraltar) Lincoln Red Imps
Jagiellonia Białystok (Poland)	1–0	(Malta) Hamrun Spartans
Lech Poznań (Poland)	4–1	(Austria) Rapid Wien
KuPS (Finland)	1–1	(Kosovo) Drita
Omonia (Cyprus)	0–1	(Germany) Mainz 05
Rayo Vallecano (Spain)	2–0	(North Macedonia) Shkëndija
Aberdeen (Scotland)	2–3	(Ukraine) Shakhtar Donetsk
Sparta Prague (Czech Republic)	4–1	(Republic of Ireland) Shamrock Rovers
Fiorentina (Italy)	2–0	(Czech Republic) Sigma Olomouc
AEK Larnaca (Cyprus)	4–0	(Netherlands) AZ
Legia Warsaw (Poland)	0–1	(Turkey) Samsunspor
Celje (Slovenia)	3–1	(Greece) AEK Athens
Raków Częstochowa (Poland)	2–0	(Romania) Universitatea Craiova
Shelbourne (Republic of Ireland)	0–0	(Sweden) BK Häcken
Slovan Bratislava (Slovakia)	1–2	(France) Strasbourg

Matchday 2
Home team	Score	Away team
AEK Athens (Greece)	6–0	(Scotland) Aberdeen
BK Häcken (Sweden)	2–2	(Spain) Rayo Vallecano
Breiðablik (Iceland)	0–0	(Finland) KuPS
Shakhtar Donetsk (Ukraine)	1–2	(Poland) Legia Warsaw
Drita (Kosovo)	1–1	(Cyprus) Omonia
Rijeka (Croatia)	1–0	(Czech Republic) Sparta Prague
Shkëndija (North Macedonia)	1–0	(Republic of Ireland) Shelbourne
Strasbourg (France)	1–1	(Poland) Jagiellonia Białystok
Rapid Wien (Austria)	0–3	(Italy) Fiorentina
AZ (Netherlands)	1–0	(Slovakia) Slovan Bratislava
Mainz 05 (Germany)	1–0	(Bosnia and Herzegovina) Zrinjski Mostar
Crystal Palace (England)	0–1	(Cyprus) AEK Larnaca
Hamrun Spartans (Malta)	0–1	(Switzerland) Lausanne-Sport
Lincoln Red Imps (Gibraltar)	2–1	(Poland) Lech Poznań
Samsunspor (Turkey)	3–0	(Ukraine) Dynamo Kyiv
Shamrock Rovers (Republic of Ireland)	0–2	(Slovenia) Celje
Sigma Olomouc (Czech Republic)	1–1	(Poland) Raków Częstochowa
Universitatea Craiova (Romania)	1–1	(Armenia) Noah

Matchday 3
Home team	Score	Away team
Mainz 05 (Germany)	2–1	(Italy) Fiorentina
Sparta Prague (Czech Republic)	0–0	(Poland) Raków Częstochowa
AEK Athens (Greece)	1–1	(Republic of Ireland) Shamrock Rovers
AEK Larnaca (Cyprus)	0–0	(Scotland) Aberdeen
Shakhtar Donetsk (Ukraine)	2–0	(Iceland) Breiðablik
Noah (Armenia)	1–2	(Czech Republic) Sigma Olomouc
KuPS (Finland)	3–1	(Slovakia) Slovan Bratislava
Celje (Slovenia)	2–1	(Poland) Legia Warsaw
Samsunspor (Turkey)	3–0	(Malta) Hamrun Spartans
BK Häcken (Sweden)	1–2	(France) Strasbourg
Crystal Palace (England)	3–1	(Netherlands) AZ
Lausanne-Sport (Switzerland)	1–1	(Cyprus) Omonia
Dynamo Kyiv (Ukraine)	6–0	(Bosnia and Herzegovina) Zrinjski Mostar
Shkëndija (North Macedonia)	1–1	(Poland) Jagiellonia Białystok
Lincoln Red Imps (Gibraltar)	1–1	(Croatia) Rijeka
Rayo Vallecano (Spain)	3–2	(Poland) Lech Poznań
Shelbourne (Republic of Ireland)	0–1	(Kosovo) Drita
Rapid Wien (Austria)	0–1	(Romania) Universitatea Craiova

Matchday 4
Home team	Score	Away team
AZ (Netherlands)	2–0	(Republic of Ireland) Shelbourne
Hamrun Spartans (Malta)	3–1	(Gibraltar) Lincoln Red Imps
Zrinjski Mostar (Bosnia and Herzegovina)	2–1	(Sweden) BK Häcken
Lech Poznań (Poland)	2–0	(Switzerland) Lausanne-Sport
Omonia (Cyprus)	2–0	(Ukraine) Dynamo Kyiv
Raków Częstochowa (Poland)	4–1	(Austria) Rapid Wien
Sigma Olomouc (Czech Republic)	2–1	(Slovenia) Celje
Universitatea Craiova (Romania)	1–0	(Germany) Mainz 05
Slovan Bratislava (Slovakia)	2–1	(Spain) Rayo Vallecano
Aberdeen (Scotland)	1–1	(Armenia) Noah
Fiorentina (Italy)	0–1	(Greece) AEK Athens
Breiðablik (Iceland)	2–2	(Turkey) Samsunspor
Drita (Kosovo)	1–0	(North Macedonia) Shkëndija
Rijeka (Croatia)	0–0	(Cyprus) AEK Larnaca
Jagiellonia Białystok (Poland)	1–0	(Finland) KuPS
Legia Warsaw (Poland)	0–1	(Czech Republic) Sparta Prague
Strasbourg (France)	2–1	(England) Crystal Palace
Shamrock Rovers (Republic of Ireland)	1–2	(Ukraine) Shakhtar Donetsk

Matchday 5
Home team	Score	Away team
Fiorentina (Italy)	2–1	(Ukraine) Dynamo Kyiv
BK Häcken (Sweden)	1–1	(Cyprus) AEK Larnaca
Breiðablik (Iceland)	3–1	(Republic of Ireland) Shamrock Rovers
Drita (Kosovo)	0–3	(Netherlands) AZ
Noah (Armenia)	2–1	(Poland) Legia Warsaw
Jagiellonia Białystok (Poland)	1–2	(Spain) Rayo Vallecano
Shkëndija (North Macedonia)	2–0	(Slovakia) Slovan Bratislava
Samsunspor (Turkey)	1–2	(Greece) AEK Athens
Universitatea Craiova (Romania)	1–2	(Czech Republic) Sparta Prague
Aberdeen (Scotland)	0–1	(France) Strasbourg
Hamrun Spartans (Malta)	0–2	(Ukraine) Shakhtar Donetsk
Rijeka (Croatia)	3–0	(Slovenia) Celje
Lech Poznań (Poland)	1–1	(Germany) Mainz 05
KuPS (Finland)	0–0	(Switzerland) Lausanne-Sport
Lincoln Red Imps (Gibraltar)	2–1	(Czech Republic) Sigma Olomouc
Raków Częstochowa (Poland)	1–0	(Bosnia and Herzegovina) Zrinjski Mostar
Shelbourne (Republic of Ireland)	0–3	(England) Crystal Palace
Rapid Wien (Austria)	0–1	(Cyprus) Omonia

Matchday 6
Home team	Score	Away team
Mainz 05 (Germany)	2–0	(Turkey) Samsunspor
Sparta Prague (Czech Republic)	3–0	(Scotland) Aberdeen
AEK Athens (Greece)	3–2	(Romania) Universitatea Craiova
AEK Larnaca (Cyprus)	1–0	(North Macedonia) Shkëndija
AZ (Netherlands)	0–0	(Poland) Jagiellonia Białystok
Crystal Palace (England)	2–2	(Finland) KuPS
Shakhtar Donetsk (Ukraine)	0–0	(Croatia) Rijeka
Dynamo Kyiv (Ukraine)	2–0	(Armenia) Noah
Lausanne-Sport (Switzerland)	1–0	(Italy) Fiorentina
Zrinjski Mostar (Bosnia and Herzegovina)	1–1	(Austria) Rapid Wien
Legia Warsaw (Poland)	4–1	(Gibraltar) Lincoln Red Imps
Celje (Slovenia)	0–0	(Republic of Ireland) Shelbourne
Omonia (Cyprus)	0–1	(Poland) Raków Częstochowa
Strasbourg (France)	3–1	(Iceland) Breiðablik
Rayo Vallecano (Spain)	3–0	(Kosovo) Drita
Shamrock Rovers (Republic of Ireland)	3–1	(Malta) Hamrun Spartans
Sigma Olomouc (Czech Republic)	1–2	(Poland) Lech Poznań
Slovan Bratislava (Slovakia)	1–0	(Sweden) BK Häcken

== Knockout phase ==
In the knockout phase, teams played against each other over two legs on a home-and-away basis, except for the one-match final. The bracket structure for the knockout phase was partially fixed in advance using seeding, with teams' positions in the bracket determined by the final standings in the league phase. In the knockout phase, there was no country protection, with teams from the same association able to face each other in any round. Teams could also face opponents they played during the league phase.

The mechanism of the draws for each round was as follows:

- In the draw for the knockout phase play-offs, the eight teams finishing the league phase in positions 9–16 were seeded, and the eight teams finishing the league phase in positions 17–24 were unseeded. The draw was split into four sections based on the predetermined bracket, with the seeded teams in each section drawn against one of their two possible unseeded opponents. The seeded teams hosted the second leg.
- In the draw for the round of 16, the eight teams finishing the league phase in positions 1–8 were seeded, and the eight winners of the knockout phase play-offs were unseeded. Again, the draw was split into four sections based on the predetermined bracket, with the seeded teams in each section drawn against one of their two possible unseeded opponents. The seeded teams hosted the second leg.

In the quarter-finals and semi-finals, both the exact match pairings and order of legs were predetermined based on the tournament bracket. The teams with the better league phase ranking played the second leg of each round at home if they continued advancing. Should a seeded team have been beaten, the team that eliminated them would take over their seeding position. The winner of semi-final 1 was designated as the "home" team for the final (for administrative purposes, as it was played at a neutral venue).

=== Bracket ===
Knockout phase play-offs
21	(Finland) KuPS	0	0	0
11	(Poland) Lech Poznań	2	1	3
19	(Armenia) Noah	1	0	1
14	(Netherlands) AZ	0	4	4
23	(Bosnia and Herzegovina) Zrinjski Mostar	1	0	1
10	(England) Crystal Palace	1	2	3
17	(Poland) Jagiellonia Białystok	0	4	4
15	(Italy) Fiorentina (a.e.t.)	3	2	5
22	(North Macedonia) Shkëndija	0	0	0
12	(Turkey) Samsunspor	1	4	5
20	(Kosovo) Drita	2	2	4
13	(Slovenia) Celje	3	3	6
24	(Czech Republic) Sigma Olomouc	1	2	3
9	(Switzerland) Lausanne-Sport	1	1	2
18	(Cyprus) Omonia	0	1	1
16	(Croatia) Rijeka	1	3	4

Round of 16
11	(Poland) Lech Poznań	1	2	3
6	(Ukraine) Shakhtar Donetsk	3	1	4
14	(Netherlands) AZ	2	4	6
4	(Czech Republic) Sparta Prague	1	0	1
10	(England) Crystal Palace (a.e.t.)	0	2	2
8	(Cyprus) AEK Larnaca	0	1	1
15	(Italy) Fiorentina	2	2	4
2	(Poland) Raków Częstochowa	1	1	2
12	(Turkey) Samsunspor	1	1	2
5	(Spain) Rayo Vallecano	3	0	3
13	(Slovenia) Celje	0	2	2
3	(Greece) AEK Athens	4	0	4
24	(Czech Republic) Sigma Olomouc	0	0	0
7	(Germany) Mainz 05	0	2	2
16	(Croatia) Rijeka	1	1	2
1	(France) Strasbourg	2	1	3

Quarter-finals
6	(Ukraine) Shakhtar Donetsk	3	2	5
14	(Netherlands) AZ	0	2	2
10	(England) Crystal Palace	3	1	4
15	(Italy) Fiorentina	0	2	2
5	(Spain) Rayo Vallecano	3	1	4
3	(Greece) AEK Athens	0	3	3
7	(Germany) Mainz 05	2	0	2
1	(France) Strasbourg	0	4	4

Semi-finals
6	(Ukraine) Shakhtar Donetsk	1	1	2
10	(England) Crystal Palace	3	2	5
5	(Spain) Rayo Vallecano	1	1	2
1	(France) Strasbourg	0	0	0

Final
27 May – Leipzig
10	(England) Crystal Palace	1
5	(Spain) Rayo Vallecano	0

=== Knockout phase play-offs ===
The draw for the knockout phase play-offs was held on 16 January 2026, 13:00 CET. The first legs were played on 19 February, and the second legs were played on 26 February 2026.

Team 1	Agg.	Team 2	1st leg	2nd leg
KuPS (Finland)	0–3	(Poland) Lech Poznań	0–2	0–1
Noah (Armenia)	1–4	(Netherlands) AZ	1–0	0–4
Zrinjski Mostar (Bosnia and Herzegovina)	1–3	(England) Crystal Palace	1–1	0–2
Jagiellonia Białystok (Poland)	4–5	(Italy) Fiorentina	0–3	4–2 (a.e.t.)
Shkëndija (North Macedonia)	0–5	(Turkey) Samsunspor	0–1	0–4
Drita (Kosovo)	4–6	(Slovenia) Celje	2–3	2–3
Sigma Olomouc (Czech Republic)	3–2	(Switzerland) Lausanne-Sport	1–1	2–1
Omonia (Cyprus)	1–4	(Croatia) Rijeka	0–1	1–3

=== Round of 16 ===
The draw for the round of 16 was held on 27 February 2026, 14:00 CET. The first legs were played on 12 March, and the second legs were played on 19 March 2026.

Team 1	Agg.	Team 2	1st leg	2nd leg
Lech Poznań (Poland)	3–4	(Ukraine) Shakhtar Donetsk	1–3	2–1
AZ (Netherlands)	6–1	(Czech Republic) Sparta Prague	2–1	4–0
Crystal Palace (England)	2–1	(Cyprus) AEK Larnaca	0–0	2–1 (a.e.t.)
Fiorentina (Italy)	4–2	(Poland) Raków Częstochowa	2–1	2–1
Samsunspor (Turkey)	2–3	(Spain) Rayo Vallecano	1–3	1–0
Celje (Slovenia)	2–4	(Greece) AEK Athens	0–4	2–0
Sigma Olomouc (Czech Republic)	0–2	(Germany) Mainz 05	0–0	0–2
Rijeka (Croatia)	2–3	(France) Strasbourg	1–2	1–1

=== Quarter-finals ===
The first legs were played on 9 April, and the second legs were played on 16 April 2026.

Team 1	Agg.	Team 2	1st leg	2nd leg
Shakhtar Donetsk (Ukraine)	5–2	(Netherlands) AZ	3–0	2–2
Crystal Palace (England)	4–2	(Italy) Fiorentina	3–0	1–2
Rayo Vallecano (Spain)	4–3	(Greece) AEK Athens	3–0	1–3
Mainz 05 (Germany)	2–4	(France) Strasbourg	2–0	0–4

=== Semi-finals ===
The first legs were played on 30 April, and the second legs were played on 7 May 2026.

Team 1	Agg.	Team 2	1st leg	2nd leg
Shakhtar Donetsk (Ukraine)	2–5	(England) Crystal Palace	1–3	1–2
Rayo Vallecano (Spain)	2–0	(France) Strasbourg	1–0	1–0

=== Final ===
The final was played on 27 May 2026 at the Red Bull Arena in Leipzig. The winner of semi-final 1 was designated as the "home" team for administrative purposes.

27 May 2026
21:00 UTC+2

Crystal Palace (The Football Association)	1–0	(Royal Spanish Football Federation) Rayo Vallecano
Mateta 51'	Report

Red Bull Arena, Leipzig
Attendance: 39,176
Referee: Maurizio Mariani (Italy)

== Statistics ==
Statistics exclude qualifying rounds and play-off round.

=== Top goalscorers ===
Rank	Player	Team	Goals	Minutes played
1	(Senegal) Ismaïla Sarr	(England) Crystal Palace	9	1103
2	(Sweden) Mikael Ishak	(Poland) Lech Poznań	8	742
2	(Chad) Marius Mouandilmadji	(Turkey) Samsunspor	8	821
4	(Netherlands) Sven Mijnans	(Netherlands) AZ	6	909
5	(Croatia) Franko Kovačević	(Slovenia) Celje	5	482
5	(Denmark) Isak Jensen	(Netherlands) AZ	5	574
5	(Bosnia and Herzegovina) Nardin Mulahusejnović	(Armenia) Noah	5	601
5	(Croatia) Toni Fruk	(Croatia) Rijeka	5	849
9	Six players		4	—N/a

=== Team of the Season ===
The UEFA technical study group selected the following players as the team of the tournament.

Pos.	Player	Team
GK	(England) Dean Henderson	(England) Crystal Palace
DF	(Romania) Andrei Rațiu	(Spain) Rayo Vallecano
DF	(France) Florian Lejeune	(Spain) Rayo Vallecano
DF	(France) Maxence Lacroix	(England) Crystal Palace
DF	(Brazil) Pedrinho	(Ukraine) Shakhtar Donetsk
MF	(Netherlands) Kees Smit	(Netherlands) AZ
MF	(England) Adam Wharton	(England) Crystal Palace
MF	(Spain) Isi Palazón	(Spain) Rayo Vallecano
FW	(Senegal) Ismaïla Sarr	(England) Crystal Palace
FW	(Chad) Marius Mouandilmadji	(Turkey) Samsunspor
FW	(Ivory Coast) Martial Godo	(France) Strasbourg

=== Player of the Season ===
- (Senegal) Ismaïla Sarr ( (England) Crystal Palace)

=== Young Player of the Season ===
- (Netherlands) Kees Smit ( (Netherlands) AZ)

== See also ==
- 2025–26 UEFA Champions League
- 2025–26 UEFA Europa League
- 2026 UEFA Super Cup
- 2025–26 UEFA Women's Champions League
- 2025–26 UEFA Women's Europa Cup
- 2025–26 UEFA Youth League
