= 2025–26 UEFA Conference League knockout phase =

Europe premier club football tournament

The 2025–26 UEFA Conference League knockout phase began on 19 February with the knockout phase play-offs and ended on 27 May 2026 with the final at the Red Bull Arena in Leipzig, Germany, to decide the champions of the 2025–26 UEFA Conference League. A total of 24 teams competed in the knockout phase, with 16 entering in the play-offs and 8 receiving a bye to the round of 16.

Times are CET/CEST, (Note: CET (UTC+1) for dates up to 28 March 2026 (knockout phase play-offs and round of 16), and CEST (UTC+2) for dates thereafter (quarter-finals, semi-finals and final).) as listed by UEFA (local times, if different, are in parentheses).

== Qualified teams ==
The knockout phase involved the top 24 teams that qualified from the league phase. The top 8 teams received a bye to the round of 16, while teams finishing in positions 9 to 24 entered the knockout phase play-offs.

Entering the round of 16 (seeded)
Pos	Team
1	(France) Strasbourg
2	(Poland) Raków Częstochowa
3	(Greece) AEK Athens
4	(Czech Republic) Sparta Prague
5	(Spain) Rayo Vallecano
6	(Ukraine) Shakhtar Donetsk
7	(Germany) Mainz 05
8	(Cyprus) AEK Larnaca

Entering the play-offs (seeded)
Pos	Team
9	(Switzerland) Lausanne-Sport
10	(England) Crystal Palace
11	(Poland) Lech Poznań
12	(Turkey) Samsunspor
13	(Slovenia) Celje
14	(Netherlands) AZ
15	(Italy) Fiorentina
16	(Croatia) Rijeka

Entering the play-offs (unseeded)
Pos	Team
17	(Poland) Jagiellonia Białystok
18	(Cyprus) Omonia
19	(Armenia) Noah
20	(Kosovo) Drita
21	(Finland) KuPS
22	(North Macedonia) Shkëndija
23	(Bosnia and Herzegovina) Zrinjski Mostar
24	(Czech Republic) Sigma Olomouc

== Format ==
Each tie in the knockout phase, apart from the final, was played over two legs, with each team playing one leg at home. The team that scored more goals on aggregate over the two legs advanced to the next round. If the aggregate score was level, then 30 minutes of extra time were played (the away goals rule was not applied). If the score was still level at the end of extra time, the winners were decided by a penalty shoot-out. In the final, which was played as a single match, if the score was level at the end of normal time, extra time was played, followed by a penalty shoot-out if the score was still level.

=== Draw procedure ===
In the knockout phase, there was no country protection, with teams from the same association able to face each other in any round. Teams could also face opponents they played during the league phase.

The mechanism of the draws for each round was as follows:

- In the draw for the knockout phase play-offs, the eight teams finishing the league phase in positions 9–16 were seeded, and the eight teams finishing the league phase in positions 17–24 were unseeded. The draw was split into four sections based on the predetermined bracket, with the seeded teams in each section drawn against one of their two possible unseeded opponents. The seeded teams hosted the second leg.
- In the draw for the round of 16, the eight teams finishing the league phase in positions 1–8 were seeded, and the eight winners of the knockout phase play-offs were unseeded. Again, the draw was split into four sections based on the predetermined bracket, with the seeded teams in each section drawn against one of their two possible unseeded opponents. The seeded teams hosted the second leg.

In the quarter-finals and semi-finals, both the exact match pairings and order of legs were predetermined based on the tournament bracket. The teams with the better league phase ranking played the second leg of each round at home if they continued advancing. Should a seeded team have been beaten, the team that eliminated them would take over their seeding position. The winner of semi-final 1 was designated as the "home" team for the final (for administrative purposes, as it was played at a neutral venue).

In the knockout phase, teams from the same or nearby cities were not scheduled to play at home on the same day or on consecutive days, due to logistics and crowd control. To avoid such scheduling conflict, if the two teams were drawn to play at home for the same leg, the home match of the team that had the lower league phase ranking (if in the same competition) or the team playing in lower tier competition (Conference League) was moved from Thursday from a regularly scheduled time to an earlier time slot, to a different day, and/or at an alternative venue without clashing any other competition. However, a fixture reversal only applied if a team qualified to play the second leg at home decided to inform the UEFA administration before the draw to reverse the tie and play the first leg at home and not a second leg at an alternative venue.

=== Predetermined pairings ===
The bracket structure for the knockout phase was partially fixed in advance using seeding, with a symmetrical pattern on both sides. Teams' positions in the bracket were determined by their final standings in the league phase, ensuring that higher-ranked teams faced lower-ranked opponents in earlier rounds. As a result, certain sets of teams, such as the top two from the league phase, could not meet until the final.

The structure of each side of the bracket can be summarised as follows, with the exact pairings of the play-offs and round of 16 determined by a draw: (Note: The draws determined the exact play-off and round of 16 pairings for each side of the bracket, which mirrored each other. For example, if the team in 9th was drawn against 23rd in the play-offs, the team in 10th would be drawn against 24th on the other side of the bracket.)

- Knockout phase play-offs
  - Pairing I: 9/10 vs 23/24
  - Pairing II: 11/12 vs 21/22
  - Pairing III: 13/14 vs 19/20
  - Pairing IV: 15/16 vs 17/18
- Round of 16
  - Pairing A: 1/2 vs Winner IV
  - Pairing B: 3/4 vs Winner III
  - Pairing C: 5/6 vs Winner II
  - Pairing D: 7/8 vs Winner I
- Quarter-finals
  - Pairing 1: Winner A vs Winner D
  - Pairing 2: Winner B vs Winner C
- Semi-finals: Winner 1 vs Winner 2

== Schedule ==
The schedule was as follows (all draws were held at the UEFA headquarters in Nyon, Switzerland).

Round	Draw date	First leg	Second leg
Knockout phase play-offs	16 January 2026	19 February 2026	26 February 2026
Round of 16	27 February 2026	12 March 2026	19 March 2026
Quarter-finals	—N/a	9 April 2026	16 April 2026
Semi-finals	—N/a	30 April 2026	7 May 2026
Final	—N/a	27 May 2026 at Red Bull Arena, Leipzig	

== Bracket ==
Knockout phase play-offs
21	(Finland) KuPS	0	0	0
11	(Poland) Lech Poznań	2	1	3
19	(Armenia) Noah	1	0	1
14	(Netherlands) AZ	0	4	4
23	(Bosnia and Herzegovina) Zrinjski Mostar	1	0	1
10	(England) Crystal Palace	1	2	3
17	(Poland) Jagiellonia Białystok	0	4	4
15	(Italy) Fiorentina (a.e.t.)	3	2	5
22	(North Macedonia) Shkëndija	0	0	0
12	(Turkey) Samsunspor	1	4	5
20	(Kosovo) Drita	2	2	4
13	(Slovenia) Celje	3	3	6
24	(Czech Republic) Sigma Olomouc	1	2	3
9	(Switzerland) Lausanne-Sport	1	1	2
18	(Cyprus) Omonia	0	1	1
16	(Croatia) Rijeka	1	3	4

Round of 16
11	(Poland) Lech Poznań	1	2	3
6	(Ukraine) Shakhtar Donetsk	3	1	4
14	(Netherlands) AZ	2	4	6
4	(Czech Republic) Sparta Prague	1	0	1
10	(England) Crystal Palace (a.e.t.)	0	2	2
8	(Cyprus) AEK Larnaca	0	1	1
15	(Italy) Fiorentina	2	2	4
2	(Poland) Raków Częstochowa	1	1	2
12	(Turkey) Samsunspor	1	1	2
5	(Spain) Rayo Vallecano	3	0	3
13	(Slovenia) Celje	0	2	2
3	(Greece) AEK Athens	4	0	4
24	(Czech Republic) Sigma Olomouc	0	0	0
7	(Germany) Mainz 05	0	2	2
16	(Croatia) Rijeka	1	1	2
1	(France) Strasbourg	2	1	3

Quarter-finals
6	(Ukraine) Shakhtar Donetsk	3	2	5
14	(Netherlands) AZ	0	2	2
10	(England) Crystal Palace	3	1	4
15	(Italy) Fiorentina	0	2	2
5	(Spain) Rayo Vallecano	3	1	4
3	(Greece) AEK Athens	0	3	3
7	(Germany) Mainz 05	2	0	2
1	(France) Strasbourg	0	4	4

Semi-finals
6	(Ukraine) Shakhtar Donetsk	1	1	2
10	(England) Crystal Palace	3	2	5
5	(Spain) Rayo Vallecano	1	1	2
1	(France) Strasbourg	0	0	0

Final
27 May – Leipzig
10	(England) Crystal Palace	1
5	(Spain) Rayo Vallecano	0

== Knockout phase play-offs ==
The draw for the knockout phase play-offs was held on 16 January 2026, 13:00 CET.

=== Seeding ===
The draw was split into four seeded and four unseeded pots, based on the predetermined pairings for the knockout phase. Teams were allocated based on their final position in the league phase. Teams in positions 9 to 16 were seeded (playing the second legs at home), while teams in positions 17 to 24 were unseeded. The draw began with the unseeded teams, allocating them all to a tie. Once completed, all the seeded teams were drawn into a tie as their opponents. For political reasons, clubs from Gibraltar–Spain and Kosovo–Bosnia and Herzegovina could not be drawn against each other. Consequently, Zrinjski Mostar and Drita had to be drawn into opposite sides of the bracket.

9/10 vs 23/24		11/12 vs 21/22	
Seeded	Unseeded	Seeded	Unseeded
(Switzerland) Lausanne-Sport; (England) Crystal Palace	(Bosnia and Herzegovina) Zrinjski Mostar; (Czech Republic) Sigma Olomouc	(Poland) Lech Poznań; (Turkey) Samsunspor	(Finland) KuPS; (North Macedonia) Shkëndija

13/14 vs 19/20		15/16 vs 17/18	
Seeded	Unseeded	Seeded	Unseeded
(Slovenia) Celje; (Netherlands) AZ	(Armenia) Noah; (Kosovo) Drita	(Italy) Fiorentina; (Croatia) Rijeka	(Poland) Jagiellonia Białystok; (Cyprus) Omonia

=== Summary ===
The first legs were played on 19 February, and the second legs were played on 26 February 2026.

Team 1	Agg.	Team 2	1st leg	2nd leg
KuPS (Finland)	0–3	(Poland) Lech Poznań	0–2	0–1
Noah (Armenia)	1–4	(Netherlands) AZ	1–0	0–4
Zrinjski Mostar (Bosnia and Herzegovina)	1–3	(England) Crystal Palace	1–1	0–2
Jagiellonia Białystok (Poland)	4–5	(Italy) Fiorentina	0–3	4–2 (a.e.t.)
Shkëndija (North Macedonia)	0–5	(Turkey) Samsunspor	0–1	0–4
Drita (Kosovo)	4–6	(Slovenia) Celje	2–3	2–3
Sigma Olomouc (Czech Republic)	3–2	(Switzerland) Lausanne-Sport	1–1	2–1
Omonia (Cyprus)	1–4	(Croatia) Rijeka	0–1	1–3

=== Matches ===
19 February 2026
18:45

KuPS (Finland)	0–2	(Poland) Lech Poznań
	Report	Kozubal 9'; Ismaheel 41'

Tammelan Stadion, Tampere (Note: KuPS played their home matches at Tammelan Stadion, Tampere, instead of their regular stadium, Kuopio Football Stadium, Kuopio, which did not meet UEFA requirements.)
Attendance: 3,756
Referee: Aliyar Aghayev (Azerbaijan)
26 February 2026
21:00

Lech Poznań (Poland)	1–0	(Finland) KuPS
Rodríguez 65'	Report

Poznań Stadium, Poznań
Attendance: 15,172
Referee: Vasilios Fotias (Greece)

Lech Poznań won 3–0 on aggregate.

19 February 2026
18:45 (21:45 UTC+4)

Noah (Armenia)	1–0	(Netherlands) AZ
Hambardzumyan 53'	Report

Vazgen Sargsyan Republican Stadium, Yerevan (Note: Noah played their home matches at Vazgen Sargsyan Republican Stadium, Yerevan, instead of their regular stadium, Armavir City Stadium, Armavir, which did not meet UEFA requirements.)
Attendance: 13,040
Referee: Orel Grinfeld (Israel)
26 February 2026
21:00

AZ (Netherlands)	4–0	(Armenia) Noah
Daal 5'; Mijnans 39', 54'; Jensen 90+1'	Report

AFAS Stadion, Alkmaar
Attendance: 11,531
Referee: Nikola Dabanović (Montenegro)

AZ won 4–1 on aggregate.

19 February 2026
18:45

Zrinjski Mostar (Bosnia and Herzegovina)	1–1	(England) Crystal Palace
Abramović 55'	Report	Sarr 43'

Stadion pod Bijelim Brijegom, Mostar
Attendance: 7,152
Referee: Manfredas Lukjančukas (Lithuania)
26 February 2026
21:00 (20:00 UTC+0)

Crystal Palace (England)	2–0	(Bosnia and Herzegovina) Zrinjski Mostar
Lacroix 36'; Guessand 90+3'	Report

Selhurst Park, London
Attendance: 18,049
Referee: Luís Godinho (Portugal)

Crystal Palace won 3–1 on aggregate.

19 February 2026
21:00

Jagiellonia Białystok (Poland)	0–3	(Italy) Fiorentina
	Report	Ranieri 53'; Mandragora 65'; Piccoli 81' (pen.)

Stadion Miejski, Białystok
Attendance: 18,531
Referee: Sebastian Gishamer (Austria)
26 February 2026
18:45

Fiorentina (Italy)	2–4 (a.e.t.)	(Poland) Jagiellonia Białystok
Fagioli 107'; Romanczuk 114' (o.g.)	Report	Mazurek 23', 45+3', 49'; Imaz 118'

Stadio Artemio Franchi, Florence
Attendance: 9,431
Referee: Srđan Jovanović (Serbia)

Fiorentina won 5–4 on aggregate.

19 February 2026
21:00

Shkëndija (North Macedonia)	0–1	(Turkey) Samsunspor
	Report	Mouandilmadji 77'

Toše Proeski Arena, Skopje (Note: Shkëndija played their home matches at Toše Proeski Arena, Skopje, instead of their regular stadium, Ecolog Arena, Tetovo, due to renovation works.)
Attendance: 3,507
Referee: Rohit Saggi (Norway)
26 February 2026
18:45 (20:45 UTC+3)

Samsunspor (Turkey)	4–0	(North Macedonia) Shkëndija
Ntcham 53' (pen.); Ndiaye 71'; Mouandilmadji 79', 90+2'	Report

Samsun 19 Mayıs Stadium, Samsun
Attendance: 7,743
Referee: Simone Sozza (Italy)

Samsunspor won 5–0 on aggregate.

19 February 2026
21:00

Drita (Kosovo)	2–3	(Slovenia) Celje
Bl. Krasniqi 59'; Balaj 75'	Report	Kučys 19'; Avdyli 41'; Poplatnik 90+4'

Fadil Vokrri Stadium, Pristina (Note: Drita played their home matches at Fadil Vokrri Stadium, Pristina, instead of their regular stadium, Gjilan City Stadium, Gjilan, due to renovation works.)
Attendance: 1,923
Referee: Chris Kavanagh (England)
26 February 2026
18:45

Celje (Slovenia)	3–2	(Kosovo) Drita
Sešlar 19', 43' (pen.); Hrka 23'	Report	Bl. Krasniqi 26'; Dabiqaj 51'

Stadion Z'dežele, Celje
Attendance: 4,152
Referee: Damian Sylwestrzak (Poland)

Celje won 6–4 on aggregate.

19 February 2026
18:45

Sigma Olomouc (Czech Republic)	1–1	(Switzerland) Lausanne-Sport
Šturm 58'	Report	Butler-Oyedeji 22'

Andrův stadion, Olomouc
Attendance: 7,467
Referee: Sander van der Eijk (Netherlands)
26 February 2026
21:00

Lausanne-Sport (Switzerland)	1–2	(Czech Republic) Sigma Olomouc
Janneh 35'	Report	Šíp 22'; Růsek 44'

Stade de la Tuilière, Lausanne
Attendance: 9,026
Referee: Nenad Minaković (Serbia)

Sigma Olomouc won 3–2 on aggregate.

19 February 2026
21:00 (22:00 UTC+2)

Omonia (Cyprus)	0–1	(Croatia) Rijeka
	Report	Adu-Adjei 86'

GSP Stadium, Nicosia
Attendance: 8,990
Referee: Juxhin Xhaja (Albania)
26 February 2026
18:45

Rijeka (Croatia)	3–1	(Cyprus) Omonia
Fruk 52', 67'; Adu-Adjei 79'	Report	Tanković 13'

Stadion Rujevica, Rijeka
Attendance: 6,965
Referee: Mykola Balakin (Ukraine)

Rijeka won 4–1 on aggregate.

== Round of 16 ==
The draw for the round of 16 was held on 27 February 2026, 14:00 CET.

=== Seeding ===
As the bracket was fixed, the draw contained only four seeded pots, based on the predetermined pairings for the knockout phase, with the top eight teams allocated based on their final position in the league phase. Teams in positions 1 to 8 were seeded (playing the second legs at home), while the bracket positions of the winners of the knockout phase play-offs (unseeded) were predetermined. The top eight teams were drawn into the bracket against one of their two possible opponents.

1/2 vs 15/16/17/18		3/4 vs 13/14/19/20	
Seeded	Predetermined	Seeded	Predetermined
(France) Strasbourg; (Poland) Raków Częstochowa	(Italy) Fiorentina; (Croatia) Rijeka	(Greece) AEK Athens; (Czech Republic) Sparta Prague	(Netherlands) AZ; (Slovenia) Celje

5/6 vs 11/12/21/22		7/8 vs 9/10/23/24	
Seeded	Predetermined	Seeded	Predetermined
(Spain) Rayo Vallecano; (Ukraine) Shakhtar Donetsk	(Poland) Lech Poznań; (Turkey) Samsunspor	(Germany) Mainz 05; (Cyprus) AEK Larnaca	(England) Crystal Palace; (Czech Republic) Sigma Olomouc

=== Summary ===
The first legs were played on 12 March, and the second legs were played on 19 March 2026.

Team 1	Agg.	Team 2	1st leg	2nd leg
Lech Poznań (Poland)	3–4	(Ukraine) Shakhtar Donetsk	1–3	2–1
AZ (Netherlands)	6–1	(Czech Republic) Sparta Prague	2–1	4–0
Crystal Palace (England)	2–1	(Cyprus) AEK Larnaca	0–0	2–1 (a.e.t.)
Fiorentina (Italy)	4–2	(Poland) Raków Częstochowa	2–1	2–1
Samsunspor (Turkey)	2–3	(Spain) Rayo Vallecano	1–3	1–0
Celje (Slovenia)	2–4	(Greece) AEK Athens	0–4	2–0
Sigma Olomouc (Czech Republic)	0–2	(Germany) Mainz 05	0–0	0–2
Rijeka (Croatia)	2–3	(France) Strasbourg	1–2	1–1

=== Matches ===
12 March 2026
18:45

Lech Poznań (Poland)	1–3	(Ukraine) Shakhtar Donetsk
Ishak 70'	Report	Marlon Gomes 36'; Newerton 48'; Isaque 85'

Poznań Stadium, Poznań
Attendance: 36,290
Referee: Rohit Saggi (Norway)
19 March 2026
21:00

Shakhtar Donetsk (Ukraine)	1–2	(Poland) Lech Poznań
Moutinho 67' (o.g.)	Report	Ishak 13', 45+7' (pen.)

Henryk Reyman Municipal Stadium, Kraków, Poland (Note: Due to the Russian invasion of Ukraine, Ukrainian teams were required to play their home matches at neutral venues. Therefore, Shakhtar Donetsk played their home matches at Henryk Reyman Municipal Stadium, Kraków, Poland, instead of their regular stadium, Donbas Arena, Donetsk.)
Attendance: 17,754
Referee: Sander van der Eijk (Netherlands)

Shakhtar Donetsk won 4–3 on aggregate.

12 March 2026
18:45

AZ (Netherlands)	2–1	(Czech Republic) Sparta Prague
Parrott 29', 87'	Report	Vojta 50'

AFAS Stadion, Alkmaar
Attendance: 14,013
Referee: Sebastian Gishamer (Austria)
19 March 2026
21:00

Sparta Prague (Czech Republic)	0–4	(Netherlands) AZ
	Report	Jensen 8'; Parrott 58'; Mijnans 62'; Daal 73'

Stadion Letná, Prague
Attendance: 18,102
Referee: Srđan Jovanović (Serbia)

AZ won 6–1 on aggregate.

12 March 2026
21:00 (20:00 UTC+0)

Crystal Palace (England)	0–0	(Cyprus) AEK Larnaca
	Report

Selhurst Park, London
Attendance: 17,985
Referee: Igor Pajač (Croatia)
19 March 2026
18:45 (19:45 UTC+2)

AEK Larnaca (Cyprus)	1–2 (a.e.t.)	(England) Crystal Palace
Saborit 63'	Report	Sarr 13', 99'

AEK Arena – Georgios Karapatakis, Larnaca
Attendance: 7,019
Referee: Aliyar Aghayev (Azerbaijan)

Crystal Palace won 2–1 on aggregate.

12 March 2026
21:00

Fiorentina (Italy)	2–1	(Poland) Raków Częstochowa
Ndour 62'; Guðmundsson 90+3' (pen.)	Report	Brunes 60'

Stadio Artemio Franchi, Florence
Attendance: 7,852
Referee: Georgi Kabakov (Bulgaria)
19 March 2026
18:45

Raków Częstochowa (Poland)	1–2	(Italy) Fiorentina
Struski 46'	Report	Piccoli 68'; Pongračić 90+7'

Zagłębie Sports Park, Sosnowiec (Note: Raków Częstochowa played their home match at Zagłębie Sports Park, Sosnowiec, instead of their regular stadium, Miejski Stadion Piłkarski Raków, Częstochowa, which did not meet UEFA requirements.)
Attendance: 11,043
Referee: Juan Martínez Munuera (Spain)

Fiorentina won 4–2 on aggregate.

12 March 2026
18:45 (20:45 UTC+3)

Samsunspor (Turkey)	1–3	(Spain) Rayo Vallecano
Mouandilmadji 21'	Report	Alemão 15', 78'; García 40'

Samsun 19 Mayıs Stadium, Samsun
Attendance: 18,095
Referee: Marian Barbu (Romania)
19 March 2026
21:00

Rayo Vallecano (Spain)	0–1	(Turkey) Samsunspor
	Report	Ndiaye 65'

Campo de Fútbol de Vallecas, Madrid
Attendance: 10,351
Referee: Sascha Stegemann (Germany)

Rayo Vallecano won 3–2 on aggregate.

12 March 2026
21:00

Celje (Slovenia)	0–4	(Greece) AEK Athens
	Report	Varga 3'; Koïta 33'; Gaćinović 36'; Moukoudi 49'

Stadion Z'dežele, Celje
Attendance: 6,020
Referee: Luís Godinho (Portugal)
19 March 2026
18:45 (19:45 UTC+2)

AEK Athens (Greece)	0–2	(Slovenia) Celje
	Report	Iosifov 13'; Požeg Vancaš 42'

Agia Sophia Stadium, Athens
Attendance: 26,221
Referee: Simone Sozza (Italy)

AEK Athens won 4–2 on aggregate.

12 March 2026
21:00

Sigma Olomouc (Czech Republic)	0–0	(Germany) Mainz 05
	Report

Andrův stadion, Olomouc
Attendance: 9,456
Referee: Mohammad Al-Emara (Finland)
19 March 2026
18:45

Mainz 05 (Germany)	2–0	(Czech Republic) Sigma Olomouc
Posch 46'; Sieb 82'	Report

Mewa Arena, Mainz
Attendance: 31,000
Referee: Andris Treimanis (Latvia)

Mainz 05 won 2–0 on aggregate.

12 March 2026
18:45

Rijeka (Croatia)	1–2	(France) Strasbourg
Majstorović 76'	Report	Panichelli 2'; Godo 72'

Stadion Rujevica, Rijeka
Attendance: 8,154
Referee: Vasilios Fotias (Greece)
19 March 2026
21:00

Strasbourg (France)	1–1	(Croatia) Rijeka
Barco 71'	Report	Fruk 21'

Stade de la Meinau, Strasbourg
Attendance: 24,233
Referee: Mykola Balakin (Ukraine)

Strasbourg won 3–2 on aggregate.

== Quarter-finals ==
=== Summary ===
The first legs were played on 9 April, and the second legs were played on 16 April 2026.

Team 1	Agg.	Team 2	1st leg	2nd leg
Shakhtar Donetsk (Ukraine)	5–2	(Netherlands) AZ	3–0	2–2
Crystal Palace (England)	4–2	(Italy) Fiorentina	3–0	1–2
Rayo Vallecano (Spain)	4–3	(Greece) AEK Athens	3–0	1–3
Mainz 05 (Germany)	2–4	(France) Strasbourg	2–0	0–4

=== Matches ===
9 April 2026
21:00

Shakhtar Donetsk (Ukraine)	3–0	(Netherlands) AZ
Pedrinho 72'; Alisson 81', 83'	Report

Henryk Reyman Municipal Stadium, Kraków, Poland
Attendance: 9,004
Referee: Nick Walsh (Scotland)
16 April 2026
18:45

AZ (Netherlands)	2–2	(Ukraine) Shakhtar Donetsk
Jensen 73'; Šín 80'	Report	Alisson 58'; Luca Meirelles 83'

AFAS Stadion, Alkmaar
Attendance: 15,439
Referee: Sven Jablonski (Germany)

Shakhtar Donetsk won 5–2 on aggregate.

9 April 2026
21:00 (20:00 UTC+1)

Crystal Palace (England)	3–0	(Italy) Fiorentina
Mateta 24' (pen.); Mitchell 31'; Sarr 90'	Report

Selhurst Park, London
Attendance: 22,775
Referee: Donatas Rumšas (Lithuania)
16 April 2026
21:00

Fiorentina (Italy)	2–1	(England) Crystal Palace
Guðmundsson 30' (pen.); Ndour 53'	Report	Sarr 17'

Stadio Artemio Franchi, Florence
Attendance: 21,045
Referee: Jesús Gil Manzano (Spain)

Crystal Palace won 4–2 on aggregate.

9 April 2026
18:45

Rayo Vallecano (Spain)	3–0	(Greece) AEK Athens
Akhomach 2'; López 45+2'; Palazón 74' (pen.)	Report

Campo de Fútbol de Vallecas, Madrid
Attendance: 13,184
Referee: Benoît Bastien (France)
16 April 2026
21:00 (22:00 UTC+3)

AEK Athens (Greece)	3–1	(Spain) Rayo Vallecano
Zini 13', 51'; Marin 36' (pen.)	Report	Palazón 60'

Agia Sophia Stadium, Athens
Attendance: 31,100
Referee: Espen Eskås (Norway)

Rayo Vallecano won 4–3 on aggregate.

9 April 2026
21:00

Mainz 05 (Germany)	2–0	(France) Strasbourg
Sano 11'; Posch 19'	Report

Mewa Arena, Mainz
Attendance: 32,000
Referee: Rade Obrenović (Slovenia)
16 April 2026
21:00

Strasbourg (France)	4–0	(Germany) Mainz 05
Nanasi 26'; Ouattara 35'; Enciso 69'; Emegha 74'	Report

Stade de la Meinau, Strasbourg
Attendance: 30,631
Referee: João Pinheiro (Portugal)

Strasbourg won 4–2 on aggregate.

== Semi-finals ==
=== Summary ===
The first legs were played on 30 April, and the second legs were played on 7 May 2026.

Team 1	Agg.	Team 2	1st leg	2nd leg
Shakhtar Donetsk (Ukraine)	2–5	(England) Crystal Palace	1–3	1–2
Rayo Vallecano (Spain)	2–0	(France) Strasbourg	1–0	1–0

=== Matches ===
30 April 2026
21:00

Shakhtar Donetsk (Ukraine)	1–3	(England) Crystal Palace
Ocheretko 47'	Report	Sarr 1'; Kamada 58'; Larsen 84'

Henryk Reyman Municipal Stadium, Kraków, Poland
Attendance: 29,842
Referee: Felix Zwayer (Germany)
7 May 2026
21:00 (20:00 UTC+1)

Crystal Palace (England)	2–1	(Ukraine) Shakhtar Donetsk
Pedrinho 25' (o.g.); Sarr 52'	Report	Eguinaldo 34'

Selhurst Park, London
Attendance: 23,080
Referee: Alejandro Hernández Hernández (Spain)

Crystal Palace won 5−2 on aggregate.

30 April 2026
21:00

Rayo Vallecano (Spain)	1–0	(France) Strasbourg
Alemão 54'	Report

Campo de Fútbol de Vallecas, Madrid
Attendance: 14,333
Referee: Donatas Rumšas (Lithuania)
7 May 2026
21:00

Strasbourg (France)	0–1	(Spain) Rayo Vallecano
	Report	Alemão 42'

Stade de la Meinau, Strasbourg
Attendance: 31,071
Referee: Ivan Kružliak (Slovakia)

Rayo Vallecano won 2−0 on aggregate.

== Final ==
The final was played on 27 May 2026 at the Red Bull Arena in Leipzig. The winner of semi-final 1 was designated as the "home" team for administrative purposes.

27 May 2026
21:00

Crystal Palace (The Football Association)	1–0	(Royal Spanish Football Federation) Rayo Vallecano
Mateta 51'	Report

Red Bull Arena, Leipzig
Attendance: 39,176
Referee: Maurizio Mariani (Italy)
