= 2025–26 UEFA Conference League qualifying (third and play-off round matches) =

European football competition

This page summarises the matches of the third qualifying and play-off rounds of 2025–26 UEFA Conference League qualifying.

Times are CEST (UTC+2), as listed by UEFA (local times, if different, are in parentheses).

== Third qualifying round ==
=== Summary ===
The first legs were played on 5 and 7 August, and the second legs were played on 13 and 14 August 2025.

Third qualifying round
Team 1	Agg.	Team 2	1st leg	2nd leg
Champions Path
Olimpija Ljubljana (Slovenia)	4–2	(Albania) Egnatia	0–0	4–2 (a.e.t.)
Milsami Orhei (Moldova)	3–5	(San Marino) Virtus	3–2	0–3
Differdange 03 (Luxembourg)	5–4	(Estonia) FCI Levadia	2–3	3–1 (a.e.t.)
Víkingur Gøta (Faroe Islands)	2–3	(Northern Ireland) Linfield	2–1	0–2
Main Path
Rapid Wien (Austria)	4–4 (5–4 p)	(Scotland) Dundee United	2–2	2–2 (a.e.t.)
Sparta Prague (Czech Republic)	6–2	Ararat-Armenia	4–1	2–1
AZ (Netherlands)	4–0	(Liechtenstein) Vaduz	3–0	1–0
Lugano (Switzerland)	4–7	(Slovenia) Celje	0–5	4–2
KÍ (Faroe Islands)	2–2 (4–5 p)	(Belarus) Neman Grodno	2–0	0–2 (a.e.t.)
Riga (Latvia)	4–3	(Israel) Beitar Jerusalem	3–0	1–3
Víkingur Reykjavík (Iceland)	3–4	(Denmark) Brøndby	3–0	0–4
Hajduk Split (Croatia)	3–4	(Albania) Dinamo City	2–1	1–3 (a.e.t.)
Anderlecht (Belgium)	4–1	(Moldova) Sheriff Tiraspol	3–0	1–1
Lausanne-Sport (Switzerland)	5–1	(Kazakhstan) Astana	3–1	2–0
Larne (Northern Ireland)	0–3	(Portugal) Santa Clara	0–3	0–0
Aris Limassol (Cyprus)	3–5	(Greece) AEK Athens	2–2	1–3 (a.e.t.)
Viking (Norway)	2–4	(Turkey) İstanbul Başakşehir	1–3	1–1
Araz-Naxçıvan (Azerbaijan)	0–9	(Cyprus) Omonia	0–4	0–5
Ballkani (Kosovo)	1–4	(Republic of Ireland) Shamrock Rovers	1–0	0–4
Raków Częstochowa (Poland)	2–1	(Israel) Maccabi Haifa	0–1	2–0
AIK (Sweden)	2–3	(Hungary) Győri ETO	2–1	0–2
Universitatea Craiova (Romania)	6–4	(Slovakia) Spartak Trnava	3–0	3–4 (a.e.t.)
Polissya Zhytomyr (Ukraine)	4–2	(Hungary) Paks	3–0	1–2
Levski Sofia (Bulgaria)	3–0	(Azerbaijan) Sabah	1–0	2–0
Silkeborg (Denmark)	2–3	(Poland) Jagiellonia Białystok	0–1	2–2
Partizan (Serbia)	3–4	(Scotland) Hibernian	0–2	3–2 (a.e.t.)
Baník Ostrava (Czech Republic)	5–4	Austria Wien	4–3	1–1
Rosenborg (Norway)	1–0	(Sweden) Hammarby IF	0–0	1–0
St Patrick's Athletic (Republic of Ireland)	3–7	(Turkey) Beşiktaş	1–4	2–3
Kauno Žalgiris (Lithuania)	0–3	(Bulgaria) Arda	0–1	0–2

=== Champions Path matches ===
7 August 2025
20:00

Olimpija Ljubljana (Slovenia)	0–0	(Albania) Egnatia
	Report

Stožice Stadium, Ljubljana
Attendance: 3,596
Referee: John Beaton (Scotland)
14 August 2025
21:00

Egnatia (Albania)	2–4 (a.e.t.)	(Slovenia) Olimpija Ljubljana
Lushkja 6', 86'	Report	Jelenković 32'; Marin 79'; Durdov 99'; Blanco 107'

Egnatia Arena, Rrogozhinë
Attendance: 4,500
Referee: Urs Schnyder (Switzerland)

Olimpija Ljubljana won 4–2 on aggregate.

7 August 2025
18:00 (19:00 UTC+3)

Milsami Orhei (Moldova)	3–2	(San Marino) Virtus
Nwaeze 31'; Khali 61'; Ndon 89'	Report	Scappini 51', 73' (pen.)

Zimbru Stadium, Chișinău (Note: Milsami Orhei played their home match at Zimbru Stadium in Chișinău, instead of their regular stadium, CSR Orhei, in Orhei, which did not meet UEFA requirements.)
Attendance: 4,693
Referee: Edgars Maļcevs (Latvia)
14 August 2025
21:00

Virtus (San Marino)	3–0	(Moldova) Milsami Orhei
Scappini 58'; Buonocunto 65', 79' (pen.)	Report

San Marino Stadium, Serravalle
Attendance: 322
Referee: Damian Kos (Poland)

Virtus won 5–3 on aggregate.

7 August 2025
20:00

Differdange 03 (Luxembourg)	2–3	(Estonia) FCI Levadia
Hadji 17', 60'	Report	Musaba 14', 52'; Ainsalu 20'

Stade Municipal de la Ville de Differdange, Differdange
Attendance: 1,637
Referee: Alessandro Dudic (Switzerland)
14 August 2025
18:30 (19:30 UTC+3)

FCI Levadia (Estonia)	1–3 (a.e.t.)	(Luxembourg) Differdange 03
Tambedou 92'	Report	Buch 89', 105+2'; Hadji 119' (pen.)

Lilleküla Stadium, Tallinn
Attendance: 4,063
Referee: Antoni Bandić (Bosnia and Herzegovina)

Differdange 03 won 5–4 on aggregate.

7 August 2025
20:00 (19:00 UTC+1)

Víkingur Gøta (Faroe Islands)	2–1	(Northern Ireland) Linfield
Hall 3' (o.g.); Jonhardsson 56'	Report	Fitzpatrick 9'

Tórsvøllur, Tórshavn (Note: Víkingur Gøta played their home match at Tórsvøllur in Tórshavn, instead of their regular stadium, Sarpugerði, in Norðragøta, which did not meet UEFA requirements.)
Attendance: 565
Referee: Luka Bilbija (Bosnia and Herzegovina)
14 August 2025
20:45 (19:45 UTC+1)

Linfield (Northern Ireland)	2–0	(Faroe Islands) Víkingur Gøta
Offord 22'; Olsen 38' (o.g.)	Report

Windsor Park, Belfast
Attendance: 3,434
Referee: Marek Radina (Czech Republic)

Linfield won 3–2 on aggregate.

=== Main Path matches ===
7 August 2025
21:00

Rapid Wien (Austria)	2–2	(Scotland) Dundee United
Dahl 27'; Seidl 44'	Report	Watters 33'; Sapsford 75'

Allianz Stadion, Vienna
Attendance: 18,930
Referee: Luís Godinho (Portugal)
14 August 2025
20:45 (19:45 UTC+1)

Dundee United (Scotland)	2–2 (a.e.t.)	(Austria) Rapid Wien
Watters 25', 42' (pen.)	Report	Antiste 63'; Kara 78'
Penalties
Fatah (penalty missed); Ferry (penalty scored); Esselink (penalty scored); Ševelj (penalty scored); Keresztes (penalty scored)	4–5	(penalty scored) Kara; (penalty scored) Mbuyi; (penalty scored) Radulović; (penalty scored) Raux-Yao; (penalty scored) Bolla

Tannadice Park, Dundee
Attendance: 12,336
Referee: Tasos Sidiropoulos (Greece)

4–4 on aggregate; Rapid Wien won 5–4 on penalties.

7 August 2025
20:00

Sparta Prague (Czech Republic)	4–1	Ararat-Armenia
Haraslín 25'; Kairinen 33'; Kuchta 60'; Birmančević 80' (pen.)	Report	Balanta 7'

Stadion Letná, Prague
Attendance: 17,316
Referee: Matthew MacDermid (Scotland)
14 August 2025
18:00 (20:00 UTC+4)

Ararat-Armenia	1–2	(Czech Republic) Sparta Prague
Balanta 31' (pen.)	Report	Rrahmani 23'; Krasniqi 90+1'

Yerevan Football Academy Stadium, Yerevan
Attendance: 1,300
Referee: Jovan Kacevski (North Macedonia)

Sparta Prague won 6–2 on aggregate.

7 August 2025
20:00

AZ (Netherlands)	3–0	(Liechtenstein) Vaduz
Parrott 29', 74'; Meerdink 80'	Report

AFAS Stadion, Alkmaar
Attendance: 11,476
Referee: Bastien Dechepy (France)
14 August 2025
19:30

Vaduz (Liechtenstein)	0–1	(Netherlands) AZ
	Report	Parrott 88'

Rheinpark Stadion, Vaduz
Attendance: 1,530
Referee: Snir Levy (Israel)

AZ won 4–0 on aggregate.

7 August 2025
20:30

Lugano (Switzerland)	0–5	(Slovenia) Celje
	Report	Šturm 35'; Kovačević 44' (pen.), 84' (pen.); Zabukovnik 59'; Kvesić 89'

Stockhorn Arena, Thun (Note: Lugano played their home match at the Stockhorn Arena, in Thun, instead of their regular stadium, the Cornaredo Stadium, in Lugano, due to renovation works.)
Attendance: 623
Referee: Sander van der Eijk (Netherlands)
14 August 2025
20:00

Celje (Slovenia)	2–4	(Switzerland) Lugano
Kovačević 22'; Kvesić 67'	Report	Grgić 13' (pen.); Papadopoulos 69'; Steffen 81'; Alioski 85' (pen.)

Stadion Z'dežele, Celje
Attendance: 4,262
Referee: Juan Martínez Munuera (Spain)

Celje won 7–4 on aggregate.

5 August 2025
20:45 (19:45 UTC+1)

KÍ (Faroe Islands)	2–0	(Belarus) Neman Grodno
Joensen 26'; Klettskarð 45+1'	Report

Tórsvøllur, Tórshavn (Note: KÍ played their home match at Tórsvøllur in Tórshavn, instead of their regular stadium, Við Djúpumýrar, in Klaksvík, which did not meet UEFA requirements.)
Attendance: 2,281
Referee: Cláudio Pereira (Portugal)
14 August 2025
20:00

Neman Grodno (Belarus)	2–0 (a.e.t.)	(Faroe Islands) KÍ
Borubaev 80'; Pantya 84'	Report
Penalties
Parkhomenko (penalty scored); Klochkov (penalty scored); Zubovich (penalty scored); Kravtsov (penalty scored); Ahmedi (penalty scored)	5–4	(penalty scored) Frederiksberg; (penalty missed) P. Johannesen; (penalty scored) J. Andreasen; (penalty scored) Johansen; (penalty scored) Rólantsson

Szent Gellért Fórum, Szeged, Hungary (Note: Due to the country's involvement in the Russian invasion of Ukraine, Belarusian teams were required to play their home matches at neutral venues and behind closed doors until further notice.)
Attendance: 0
Referee: Don Robertson (Scotland)

2–2 on aggregate; Neman Grodno won 5–4 on penalties.

7 August 2025
19:00 (20:00 UTC+3)

Riga (Latvia)	3–0	(Israel) Beitar Jerusalem
Ramires 47', 63'; Musah 69'	Report

Skonto Stadium, Riga
Attendance: 5,122
Referee: Lionel Tschudi (Switzerland)
14 August 2025
19:30 (20:30 UTC+3)

Beitar Jerusalem (Israel)	3–1	(Latvia) Riga
Atzili 6'; Muzie 24'; Kangani 90+4'	Report	Contreras 86'

Ilie Oană Stadium, Ploiești, Romania (Note: Due to the Gaza war, Israeli teams were required to play their home matches at neutral venues until further notice.)
Attendance: 752
Referee: Paweł Raczkowski (Poland)

Riga won 4–3 on aggregate.

7 August 2025
20:45 (18:45 UTC±0)

Víkingur Reykjavík (Iceland)	3–0	(Denmark) Brøndby
Hansen 45'; Ekroth 47'; Andrason 83'	Report

Víkingsvöllur, Reykjavík
Attendance: 1,200
Referee: Atilla Karaoğlan (Turkey)
14 August 2025
19:30

Brøndby (Denmark)	4–0	(Iceland) Víkingur Reykjavík
Vallys 45+2', 52'; Bundgaard 57', 71'	Report

Brøndby Stadium, Brøndbyvester
Attendance: 17,329
Referee: Guillermo Cuadra Fernández (Spain)

Brøndby won 4–3 on aggregate.

7 August 2025
21:00

Hajduk Split (Croatia)	2–1	(Albania) Dinamo City
Durdov 49'; Sanyang 63'	Report	Bregu 37'

Stadion Poljud, Split
Attendance: 31,652
Referee: Sayat Karabayev (Kazakhstan)
14 August 2025
20:45

Dinamo City (Albania)	3–1 (a.e.t.)	(Croatia) Hajduk Split
Zabërgja 14'; Qardaku 109'; H. Berisha 111'	Report	Karačić 99'

Arena Kombëtare, Tirana
Attendance: 5,227
Referee: Denys Shurman (Ukraine)

Dinamo City won 4–3 on aggregate.

7 August 2025
20:00

Anderlecht (Belgium)	3–0	(Moldova) Sheriff Tiraspol
Angulo 17'; Dolberg 48'; Verschaeren 81'	Report

Constant Vanden Stock Stadium, Brussels
Attendance: 14,124
Referee: Nenad Minaković (Serbia)
14 August 2025
19:00 (20:00 UTC+3)

Sheriff Tiraspol (Moldova)	1–1	(Belgium) Anderlecht
Odede 81'	Report	Saliba 72'

Zimbru Stadium, Chișinău (Note: Sheriff Tiraspol played their third qualifying round home match at the Zimbru Stadium in Chișinău, instead of their regular stadium, the Sheriff Arena, in Tiraspol, due to the Belgian government's travel advisory concerning Transnistria.)
Attendance: 4,123
Referee: Halil Umut Meler (Turkey)

Anderlecht won 4–1 on aggregate.

7 August 2025
20:15

Lausanne-Sport (Switzerland)	3–1	(Kazakhstan) Astana
Roche 24'; Sène 43'; Ajdini 72'	Report	Bašić 90'

Stade de la Tuilière, Lausanne
Attendance: 9,008
Referee: Łukasz Kuzma (Poland)
14 August 2025
16:00 (19:00 UTC+5)

Astana (Kazakhstan)	0–2	(Switzerland) Lausanne-Sport
	Report	Lekweiry 48'; Diakité 66'

Astana Arena, Astana
Attendance: 27,985
Referee: Martin Matoša (Slovenia)

Lausanne-Sport won 5–1 on aggregate.

7 August 2025
21:00 (20:00 UTC+1)

Larne (Northern Ireland)	0–3	(Portugal) Santa Clara
	Report	Wendel 26'; Silva 33', 36'

Ballymena Showgrounds, Ballymena (Note: Larne played their home matches at Ballymena Showgrounds in Ballymena, as their own stadium, Inver Park, failed a UEFA pitch inspection.)
Attendance: 1,139
Referee: Adam Ladebäck (Sweden)
14 August 2025
21:00 (19:00 UTC±0)

Santa Clara (Portugal)	0–0	(Northern Ireland) Larne
	Report

Estádio de São Miguel, Ponta Delgada
Attendance: 4,008
Referee: Jakob Alexander Sundberg (Denmark)

Santa Clara won 3–0 on aggregate.

7 August 2025
18:00 (19:00 UTC+3)

Aris Limassol (Cyprus)	2–2	(Greece) AEK Athens
Kakoullis 18'; Goldson 31'	Report	Pereyra 9'; Relvas 14'

Alphamega Stadium, Limassol
Attendance: 5,921
Referee: Goga Kikacheishvili (Georgia)
14 August 2025
20:00 (21:00 UTC+3)

AEK Athens (Greece)	3–1 (a.e.t.)	(Cyprus) Aris Limassol
Marin 51' (pen.); Kutesa 104'; Jović 109'	Report	Kvilitaia 62' (pen.)

Agia Sophia Stadium, Athens
Attendance: 15,221
Referee: Allard Lindhout (Netherlands)

AEK Athens won 5–3 on aggregate.

7 August 2025
19:00

Viking (Norway)	1–3	(Turkey) İstanbul Başakşehir
Svendsen 2'	Report	Türüç 60'; Opéri 79'; Selke 90+4'

Viking Stadion, Stavanger
Attendance: 11,652
Referee: Miguel Nogueira (Portugal)
13 August 2025
18:00 (19:00 UTC+3)

İstanbul Başakşehir (Turkey)	1–1	(Norway) Viking
Selke 40'	Report	Bulut 34' (o.g.)

Başakşehir Fatih Terim Stadium, Istanbul
Attendance: 6,763
Referee: Miloš Milanović (Serbia)

İstanbul Başakşehir won 4–2 on aggregate.

7 August 2025
18:00 (20:00 UTC+4)

Araz-Naxçıvan (Azerbaijan)	0–4	(Cyprus) Omonia
	Report	Loizou 13', 22'; Ewandro 55'; Jovetić 58'

Dalga Arena, Baku (Note: Araz-Naxçıvan played their home match at the Dalga Arena in Baku, instead of their regular stadium, the Nakhchivan City Stadium, in Nakhchivan, which did not meet UEFA requirements.)
Attendance: 4,200
Referee: Ondřej Berka (Czech Republic)
14 August 2025
19:00 (20:00 UTC+3)

Omonia (Cyprus)	5–0	(Azerbaijan) Araz-Naxçıvan
Semedo 9'; Jovetić 23'; Ewandro 30', 45+4'; Musiałowski 79'	Report

GSP Stadium, Nicosia
Attendance: 6,523
Referee: Jakob Kehlet (Denmark)

Omonia won 9–0 on aggregate.

7 August 2025
20:30

Ballkani (Kosovo)	1–0	(Republic of Ireland) Shamrock Rovers
Adetunji 56'	Report

Fadil Vokrri Stadium, Pristina (Note: Ballkani played their home match at the Fadil Vokrri Stadium in Pristina, instead of their regular stadium, the Suva Reka City Stadium, in Suva Reka, which did not meet UEFA requirements.)
Attendance: 2,236
Referee: Dmytro Panchyshyn (Ukraine)
14 August 2025
21:00 (20:00 UTC+1)

Shamrock Rovers (Republic of Ireland)	4–0	(Kosovo) Ballkani
Gaffney 45+1', 48'; J. Honohan 55'; Burke 67'	Report

Tallaght Stadium, Dublin
Attendance: 6,419
Referee: Mohammad Al-Emara (Finland)

Shamrock Rovers won 4–1 on aggregate.

7 August 2025
21:00

Raków Częstochowa (Poland)	0–1	(Israel) Maccabi Haifa
	Report	Azoulay 61'

Miejski Stadion Piłkarski Raków, Częstochowa
Attendance: 5,302
Referee: Rob Harvey (Republic of Ireland)
14 August 2025
20:00

Maccabi Haifa (Israel)	0–2	(Poland) Raków Częstochowa
	Report	Baráth 45+1'; Diaby-Fadiga 76' (pen.)

Nagyerdei Stadion, Debrecen, Hungary
Attendance: 665
Referee: Jérôme Brisard (France)

Raków Częstochowa won 2–1 on aggregate.

7 August 2025
19:00

AIK (Sweden)	2–1	(Hungary) Győri ETO
Beširović 7'; Celina 21'	Report	Vitális 79'

Strawberry Arena, Stockholm
Attendance: 17,842
Referee: Daniel Schlager (Germany)
14 August 2025
19:00

Győri ETO (Hungary)	2–0	(Sweden) AIK
Gavrić 34'; Csongvai 60' (o.g.)	Report

ETO Park, Győr
Attendance: 6,991
Referee: Lawrence Visser (Belgium)

Győri ETO won 3–2 on aggregate.

7 August 2025
20:30 (21:30 UTC+3)

Universitatea Craiova (Romania)	3–0	(Slovakia) Spartak Trnava
Baiaram 51'; Al Hamlawi 54'; Mora 81'	Report

Ion Oblemenco Stadium, Craiova
Attendance: 22,664
Referee: Joonas Jaanovits (Estonia)
14 August 2025
20:30

Spartak Trnava (Slovakia)	4–3 (a.e.t.)	(Romania) Universitatea Craiova
Kratochvíl 36'; Nwadike 63'; Azango 68'; Kudlička 80'	Report	Baiaram 32'; Băluță 101'; Nsimba 117'

Anton Malatinský Stadium, Trnava
Attendance: 9,337
Referee: Stuart Attwell (England)

Universitatea Craiova won 6–4 on aggregate.

7 August 2025
20:00

Polissya Zhytomyr (Ukraine)	3–0	(Hungary) Paks
Andriyevskyi 41'; Beskorovaynyi 45+1'; Lyednyev 59'	Report

Futbal Tatran Arena, Prešov, Slovakia (Note: Due to the Russian invasion of Ukraine, Ukrainian teams were required to play their home matches at neutral venues until further notice.)
Attendance: 1,203
Referee: Joakim Östling (Sweden)
14 August 2025
19:00

Paks (Hungary)	2–1	(Ukraine) Polissya Zhytomyr
Szabó 39'; Tóth 49'	Report	Talles 90+6'

Fehérvári úti Stadion, Paks
Attendance: 1,812
Referee: Daniel Schlager (Germany)

Polissya Zhytomyr won 4–2 on aggregate.

7 August 2025
20:00 (21:00 UTC+3)

Levski Sofia (Bulgaria)	1–0	(Azerbaijan) Sabah
Rupanov 90+8'	Report

Stadion Georgi Asparuhov, Sofia
Attendance: 16,163
Referee: Duje Strukan (Croatia)
14 August 2025
18:00 (20:00 UTC+4)

Sabah (Azerbaijan)	0–2	(Bulgaria) Levski Sofia
	Report	Kirilov 40'; Soula 87'

Bank Respublika Arena, Masazir
Attendance: 6,606
Referee: Mykola Balakin (Ukraine)

Levski Sofia won 3–0 on aggregate.

7 August 2025
19:00

Silkeborg (Denmark)	0–1	(Poland) Jagiellonia Białystok
	Report	Vital 15'

JYSK Park, Silkeborg
Attendance: 4,289
Referee: Jamie Robinson (Northern Ireland)
14 August 2025
20:15

Jagiellonia Białystok (Poland)	2–2	(Denmark) Silkeborg
Imaz 29', 35'	Report	Berger 87'; Gammelby 90+5'

Stadion Miejski, Białystok
Attendance: 17,369
Referee: Eric Wattellier (France)

Jagiellonia Białystok won 3–2 on aggregate.

7 August 2025
21:00

Partizan (Serbia)	0–2	(Scotland) Hibernian
	Report	Boyle 40', 70' (pen.)

Partizan Stadium, Belgrade
Attendance: 26,342
Referee: Philip Farrugia (Malta)
14 August 2025
21:00 (20:00 UTC+1)

Hibernian (Scotland)	2–3 (a.e.t.)	(Serbia) Partizan
Bowie 60'; C. Cadden 100'	Report	Vukotić 17'; J. Milošević 44'; A. Kostić 90+6'

Easter Road, Edinburgh
Attendance: 19,377
Referee: Radoslav Gidzhenov (Bulgaria)

Hibernian won 4–3 on aggregate.

7 August 2025
18:30

Baník Ostrava (Czech Republic)	4–3	Austria Wien
Kohút 36'; Buchta 45'; Holzer 49'; Prekop 82'	Report	Malone 4'; Fitz 67'; Sarkaria 79'

Městský stadion, Ostrava
Attendance: 12,567
Referee: Mohammed Al-Hakim (Sweden)
14 August 2025
21:00

Austria Wien	1–1	(Czech Republic) Baník Ostrava
Wiesinger 67'	Report	Prekop 45+1' (pen.)

Franz Horr Stadium, Vienna
Attendance: 10,022
Referee: Juxhin Xhaja (Albania)

Baník Ostrava won 5–4 on aggregate.

7 August 2025
18:00

Rosenborg (Norway)	0–0	(Sweden) Hammarby IF
	Report

Lerkendal Stadion, Trondheim
Attendance: 16,077
Referee: Zorbay Küçük (Turkey)
14 August 2025
19:00

Hammarby IF (Sweden)	0–1	(Norway) Rosenborg
	Report	Islamović 59'

3Arena, Stockholm
Attendance: 25,915
Referee: Vassilis Fotias (Greece)

Rosenborg won 1–0 on aggregate.

7 August 2025
20:45 (19:45 UTC+1)

St Patrick's Athletic (Republic of Ireland)	1–4	(Turkey) Beşiktaş
Power 49'	Report	João Mário 8'; Abraham 14', 23', 43' (pen.)

Tallaght Stadium, Dublin (Note: St Patrick's Athletic played their third round home match at Tallaght Stadium, instead of their regular stadium, Richmond Park, which did not meet UEFA requirements.)
Attendance: 7,821
Referee: David Šmajc (Slovenia)
14 August 2025
20:00 (21:00 UTC+3)

Beşiktaş (Turkey)	3–2	(Republic of Ireland) St Patrick's Athletic
Tıknaz 43'; Abraham 49'; João Mário 79'	Report	Carty 3' (pen.); McLaughlin 34'

Beşiktaş Stadium, Istanbul
Attendance: 20,456
Referee: António Nobre (Portugal)

Beşiktaş won 7–3 on aggregate.

7 August 2025
18:00 (19:00 UTC+3)

Kauno Žalgiris (Lithuania)	0–1	(Bulgaria) Arda
	Report	Vutov 53'

Darius and Girėnas Stadium, Kaunas
Attendance: 7,562
Referee: Jérémy Muller (Luxembourg)
14 August 2025
19:30 (20:30 UTC+3)

Arda (Bulgaria)	2–0	(Lithuania) Kauno Žalgiris
Velkovski 8'; Kovachev 12'	Report

Arena Arda, Kardzhali
Attendance: 4,840
Referee: Ante Čulina (Croatia)

Arda won 3–0 on aggregate.

== Play-off round ==
=== Summary ===
The first legs were played on 21 August, and the second legs were played on 27 and 28 August 2025.

Play-off round
Team 1	Agg.	Team 2	1st leg	2nd leg
Champions Path
Hamrun Spartans (Malta)	3–2	(Latvia) RFS	1–0	2–2
Shelbourne (Republic of Ireland)	5–1	(Northern Ireland) Linfield	3–1	2–0
Breiðablik (Iceland)	5–2	(San Marino) Virtus	2–1	3–1
Drita (Kosovo)	3–1	(Luxembourg) Differdange 03	2–1	1–0
Olimpija Ljubljana (Slovenia)	3–7	(Armenia) Noah	1–4	2–3
Main Path
Strasbourg (France)	3–2	(Denmark) Brøndby	0–0	3–2
Jagiellonia Białystok (Poland)	4–1	(Albania) Dinamo City	3–0	1–1
Shakhtar Donetsk (Ukraine)	3–2	(Switzerland) Servette	1–1	2–1 (a.e.t.)
Anderlecht (Belgium)	1–3	(Greece) AEK Athens	1–1	0–2
İstanbul Başakşehir (Turkey)	2–5	(Romania) Universitatea Craiova	1–2	1–3
Crystal Palace (England)	1–0	(Norway) Fredrikstad	1–0	0–0
Celje (Slovenia)	3–0	(Czech Republic) Baník Ostrava	1–0	2–0
Raków Częstochowa (Poland)	3–1	(Bulgaria) Arda	1–0	2–1
Hibernian (Scotland)	4–5	(Poland) Legia Warsaw	1–2	3–3 (a.e.t.)
Levski Sofia (Bulgaria)	1–6	(Netherlands) AZ	0–2	1–4
Polissya Zhytomyr (Ukraine)	2–6	(Italy) Fiorentina	0–3	2–3
Győri ETO (Hungary)	2–3	(Austria) Rapid Wien	2–1	0–2
Neman Grodno (Belarus)	0–5	(Spain) Rayo Vallecano	0–1	0–4
Lausanne-Sport (Switzerland)	2–1	(Turkey) Beşiktaş	1–1	1–0
Santa Clara (Portugal)	1–2	(Republic of Ireland) Shamrock Rovers	1–2	0–0
Rosenborg (Norway)	3–5	(Germany) Mainz 05	2–1	1–4
Sparta Prague (Czech Republic)	2–1	(Latvia) Riga	2–0	0–1
BK Häcken (Sweden)	7–3	(Romania) CFR Cluj	7–2	0–1
Wolfsberger AC (Austria)	2–2 (4–5 p)	(Cyprus) Omonia	2–1	0–1 (a.e.t.)

=== Champions Path matches ===
21 August 2025
19:00

Hamrun Spartans (Malta)	1–0	(Latvia) RFS
Thioune 55'	Report

National Stadium, Ta' Qali (Note: Hamrun Spartans played their play-off round home match at the National Stadium in Ta' Qali, instead of their regular stadium, the Victor Tedesco Stadium in Hamrun, which did not meet UEFA requirements.)
Attendance: 1,401
Referee: Ashot Ghaltakhchyan (Armenia)
28 August 2025
19:00 (20:00 UTC+3)

RFS (Latvia)	2–2	(Malta) Hamrun Spartans
Panić 17' (pen.); Lemajić 87'	Report	Thioune 12'; Polito 67'

LNK Sporta Parks, Riga
Attendance: 1,674
Referee: Horațiu Feșnic (Romania)

Hamrun Spartans won 3–2 on aggregate.

21 August 2025
20:45 (19:45 UTC+1)

Shelbourne (Republic of Ireland)	3–1	(Northern Ireland) Linfield
Wood 45+1' (pen.); Odubeko 46'; Caffrey 78'	Report	Offord 53'

Tolka Park, Dublin
Attendance: 3,655
Referee: Vassilis Fotias (Greece)
28 August 2025
20:45 (19:45 UTC+1)

Linfield (Northern Ireland)	0–2	(Republic of Ireland) Shelbourne
	Report	Wood 23'; Coote 30'

Windsor Park, Belfast
Attendance: 5,200
Referee: Julian Weinberger (Austria)

Shelbourne won 5–1 on aggregate.

21 August 2025
20:00 (18:00 UTC±0)

Breiðablik (Iceland)	2–1	(San Marino) Virtus
Valgeirsson 31'; Thomsen 55' (pen.)	Report	Scappini 11' (pen.)

Kópavogsvöllur, Kópavogur
Attendance: 1,164
Referee: Mikkel Redder (Denmark)
28 August 2025
21:00

Virtus (San Marino)	1–3	(Iceland) Breiðablik
Niang 41'	Report	Kristinsson 17'; Ingvarsson 59'; Thomsen 77'

San Marino Stadium, Serravalle
Attendance: 1,124
Referee: Mykola Balakin (Ukraine)

Breiðablik won 5–2 on aggregate.

21 August 2025
20:00

Drita (Kosovo)	2–1	(Luxembourg) Differdange 03
Dabiqaj 30'; Be. Krasniqi 80' (pen.)	Report	Buch 65'

Fadil Vokrri Stadium, Pristina (Note: Drita played their home match at the Fadil Vokrri Stadium in Pristina, instead of their regular stadium, the Gjilan City Stadium, in Gjilan, due to renovation works.)
Attendance: 2,930
Referee: Mohammed Al-Hakim (Sweden)
28 August 2025
20:00

Differdange 03 (Luxembourg)	0–1	(Kosovo) Drita
	Report	Be. Krasniqi 62' (pen.)

Stade Municipal de la Ville de Differdange, Differdange
Attendance: 1,910
Referee: Andrea Colombo (Italy)

Drita won 3–1 on aggregate.

21 August 2025
20:00

Olimpija Ljubljana (Slovenia)	1–4	(Armenia) Noah
Durdov 56'	Report	Jakoliš 36'; Oulad Omar 39', 52' (pen.), 64'

Stožice Stadium, Ljubljana
Attendance: 3,937
Referee: Allard Lindhout (Netherlands)
28 August 2025
18:00 (20:00 UTC+4)

Noah (Armenia)	3–2	(Slovenia) Olimpija Ljubljana
Ferreira 17'; Aiás 20'; Harutyunyan 77'	Report	Marin 56' (pen.); Durdov 76'

Abovyan City Stadium, Abovyan
Attendance: 2,900
Referee: Andris Treimanis (Latvia)

Noah won 7–3 on aggregate.

=== Main Path matches ===
21 August 2025
20:00

Strasbourg (France)	0–0	(Denmark) Brøndby
	Report

Stade de la Meinau, Strasbourg
Attendance: 22,080
Referee: Genc Nuza (Kosovo)
28 August 2025
20:00

Brøndby (Denmark)	2–3	(France) Strasbourg
Wass 45'; Gregoritsch 86'	Report	Emegha 15', 66'; Doukouré 40'

Brøndby Stadium, Brøndbyvester
Attendance: 23,930
Referee: Nenad Minaković (Serbia)

Strasbourg won 3–2 on aggregate.

21 August 2025
20:15

Jagiellonia Białystok (Poland)	3–0	(Albania) Dinamo City
Imaz 12'; Pululu 34'; Wojtuszek 50'	Report

Stadion Miejski, Białystok
Attendance: 17,450
Referee: Marian Alexandru Barbu (Romania)
28 August 2025
20:45

Dinamo City (Albania)	1–1	(Poland) Jagiellonia Białystok
Bregu 68'	Report	Rallis 79'

Arena Kombëtare, Tirana
Attendance: 2,644
Referee: Goga Kikacheishvili (Georgia)

Jagiellonia Białystok won 4–1 on aggregate.

21 August 2025
20:00

Shakhtar Donetsk (Ukraine)	1–1	(Switzerland) Servette
Bondar 72'	Report	Fomba 8'

Henryk Reyman Municipal Stadium, Kraków, Poland
Attendance: 8,392
Referee: Nick Walsh (Scotland)
28 August 2025
21:00

Servette (Switzerland)	1–2 (a.e.t.)	(Ukraine) Shakhtar Donetsk
Njoh 53'	Report	Kevin 70' (pen.); Elias 113'

Stade de Genève, Geneva
Attendance: 13,224
Referee: Guillermo Cuadra Fernández (Spain)

Shakhtar Donetsk won 3–2 on aggregate.

21 August 2025
20:00

Anderlecht (Belgium)	1–1	(Greece) AEK Athens
Dolberg 21'	Report	Eliasson 75'

Constant Vanden Stock Stadium, Brussels
Attendance: 13,466
Referee: Jérôme Brisard (France)
28 August 2025
20:00 (21:00 UTC+3)

AEK Athens (Greece)	2–0	(Belgium) Anderlecht
Koïta 36'; Kutesa 48'	Report

Agia Sophia Stadium, Athens
Attendance: 25,891
Referee: Rohit Saggi (Norway)

AEK Athens won 3–1 on aggregate.

21 August 2025
19:45 (20:45 UTC+3)

İstanbul Başakşehir (Turkey)	1–2	(Romania) Universitatea Craiova
Ebosele 87'	Report	Cicâldău 45+2'; Mora 61'

Başakşehir Fatih Terim Stadium, Istanbul
Attendance: 7,230
Referee: Juxhin Xhaja (Albania)
28 August 2025
19:30 (20:30 UTC+3)

Universitatea Craiova (Romania)	3–1	(Turkey) İstanbul Başakşehir
Cicâldău 9'; Baiaram 27'; Nsimba 81'	Report	Selke 7'

Ion Oblemenco Stadium, Craiova
Attendance: 27,884
Referee: Daniel Schlager (Germany)

Universitatea Craiova won 5–2 on aggregate.

21 August 2025
21:00 (20:00 UTC+1)

Crystal Palace (England)	1–0	(Norway) Fredrikstad
Mateta 54'	Report

Selhurst Park, London
Attendance: 23,013
Referee: Anastasios Papapetrou (Greece)
28 August 2025
18:00

Fredrikstad (Norway)	0–0	(England) Crystal Palace
	Report

Fredrikstad Stadion, Fredrikstad
Attendance: 10,016
Referee: Kristo Tohver (Estonia)

Crystal Palace won 1–0 on aggregate.

21 August 2025
20:00

Celje (Slovenia)	1–0	(Czech Republic) Baník Ostrava
Chalus 8' (o.g.)	Report

Stadion Z'dežele, Celje
Attendance: 5,327
Referee: Elchin Masiyev (Azerbaijan)
28 August 2025
20:00

Baník Ostrava (Czech Republic)	0–2	(Slovenia) Celje
	Report	Iosifov 10'; Karničnik 21'

Městský stadion, Ostrava
Attendance: 14,286
Referee: Tasos Sidiropoulos (Greece)

Celje won 3–0 on aggregate.

21 August 2025
21:00

Raków Częstochowa (Poland)	1–0	(Bulgaria) Arda
Pieńko 28'	Report

Miejski Stadion Piłkarski Raków, Częstochowa
Attendance: 5,500
Referee: Michal Očenáš (Slovakia)
28 August 2025
20:00 (21:00 UTC+3)

Arda (Bulgaria)	1–2	(Poland) Raków Częstochowa
Vutov 59' (pen.)	Report	Baráth 2'; Ivi 90+3'

Arena Arda, Kardzhali
Attendance: 4,450
Referee: Igor Pajač (Croatia)

Raków Częstochowa won 3–1 on aggregate.

21 August 2025
21:00 (20:00 UTC+1)

Hibernian (Scotland)	1–2	(Poland) Legia Warsaw
Mulligan 87'	Report	Nsame 35' (pen.); Wszołek 45+3'

Easter Road, Edinburgh
Attendance: 18,958
Referee: Mohammad Al-Emara (Finland)
28 August 2025
21:00

Legia Warsaw (Poland)	3–3 (a.e.t.)	(Scotland) Hibernian
Bichakhchyan 13'; Elitim 90+3'; Rajović 98'	Report	Bushiri 50'; Boyle 59'; Chaiwa 61'

Polish Army Stadium, Warsaw
Attendance: 27,659
Referee: Lawrence Visser (Belgium)

Legia Warsaw won 5–4 on aggregate.

21 August 2025
20:00 (21:00 UTC+3)

Levski Sofia (Bulgaria)	0–2	(Netherlands) AZ
	Report	Sadiq 56'; Parrott 62'

Vasil Levski National Stadium, Sofia (Note: Levski Sofia played their play-off round home match at the Vasil Levski National Stadium in Sofia, instead of their regular stadium, Stadion Georgi Asparuhov in Sofia.)
Attendance: 29,930
Referee: Tamás Bognár (Hungary)
28 August 2025
19:30

AZ (Netherlands)	4–1	(Bulgaria) Levski Sofia
Sadiq 3', 45+1'; Meerdink 6'; Zeefuik 86'	Report	Everton 47'

AFAS Stadion, Alkmaar
Attendance: 12,612
Referee: Damian Sylwestrzak (Poland)

AZ won 6–1 on aggregate.

21 August 2025
20:00

Polissya Zhytomyr (Ukraine)	0–3	(Italy) Fiorentina
	Report	Kudryk 8' (o.g.); Gosens 32'; Guðmundsson 69'

Futbal Tatran Arena, Prešov, Slovakia
Attendance: 6,173
Referee: Aliyar Aghayev (Azerbaijan)
28 August 2025
20:00

Fiorentina (Italy)	3–2	(Ukraine) Polissya Zhytomyr
Dodô 79'; Ranieri 86'; Džeko 89'	Report	Nazarenko 2'; Andriyevskyi 14'

Mapei Stadium – Città del Tricolore, Reggio Emilia (Note: Fiorentina will play their play-off round home match at the Mapei Stadium – Città del Tricolore in Reggio Emilia, instead of their regular stadium, Stadio Artemio Franchi in Florence, due to renovation works.)
Attendance: 5,033
Referee: Ricardo de Burgos Bengoetxea (Spain)

Fiorentina won 6–2 on aggregate.

21 August 2025
19:00

Győri ETO (Hungary)	2–1	(Austria) Rapid Wien
Gavrić 46', 82'	Report	Wurmbrand 61'

ETO Park, Győr
Attendance: 8,055
Referee: Igor Stojchevski (North Macedonia)
28 August 2025
19:00

Rapid Wien (Austria)	2–0	(Hungary) Győri ETO
Mbuyi 7', 81'	Report

Allianz Stadion, Vienna
Attendance: 22,250
Referee: Manfredas Lukjančukas (Lithuania)

Rapid Wien won 3–2 in aggregate.

21 August 2025
20:00

Neman Grodno (Belarus)	0–1	(Spain) Rayo Vallecano
	Report	García 77'

Szent Gellért Fórum, Szeged, Hungary
Attendance: 0
Referee: Arda Kardeşler (Turkey)
28 August 2025
20:00

Rayo Vallecano (Spain)	4–0	(Belarus) Neman Grodno
García 64', 89'; Camello 66'; De Frutos 80'	Report

Campo de Fútbol de Vallecas, Madrid
Attendance: 12,404
Referee: Jérémie Pignard (France)

Rayo Vallecano won 5–0 on aggregate.

21 August 2025
20:15

Lausanne-Sport (Switzerland)	1–1	(Turkey) Beşiktaş
Okoh 83'	Report	Rashica 45'

Stade de la Tuilière, Lausanne
Attendance: 11,931
Referee: Sigurd Kringstad (Norway)
28 August 2025
19:00 (20:00 UTC+3)

Beşiktaş (Turkey)	0–1	(Switzerland) Lausanne-Sport
	Report	Butler-Oyedeji 45+1'

Beşiktaş Stadium, Istanbul
Attendance: 27,031
Referee: Jakob Kehlet (Denmark)

Lausanne-Sport won 2–1 on aggregate.

21 August 2025
21:00 (19:00 UTC±0)

Santa Clara (Portugal)	1–2	(Republic of Ireland) Shamrock Rovers
Lopes 20'	Report	Grant 43'; Mandroiu 66'

Estádio de São Miguel, Ponta Delgada
Attendance: 3,632
Referee: Stefan Ebner (Austria)
28 August 2025
21:00 (20:00 UTC+1)

Shamrock Rovers (Republic of Ireland)	0–0	(Portugal) Santa Clara
	Report

Tallaght Stadium, Dublin
Attendance: 8,223
Referee: Matej Jug (Slovenia)

Shamrock Rovers won 2–1 on aggregate.

21 August 2025
18:00

Rosenborg (Norway)	2–1	(Germany) Mainz 05
Islamović 43' (pen.); Sæter 90'	Report	Amiri 26'

Lerkendal Stadion, Trondheim
Attendance: 18,293
Referee: Oleksii Derevinskyi (Ukraine)
28 August 2025
21:00

Mainz 05 (Germany)	4–1	(Norway) Rosenborg
Bell 28'; Lee 43'; Weiper 44'; Amiri 58'	Report	Islamović 34'

Mewa Arena, Mainz
Attendance: 30,000
Referee: Sander van der Eijk (Netherlands)

Mainz 05 won 5–3 on aggregate.

21 August 2025
20:00

Sparta Prague (Czech Republic)	2–0	(Latvia) Riga
Kuchta 22'; Rrahmani 90'	Report

Stadion Letná, Prague
Attendance: 17,168
Referee: Enea Jorgji (Albania)
27 August 2025
18:45 (19:45 UTC+3)

Riga (Latvia)	1–0	(Czech Republic) Sparta Prague
Siqueira 68'	Report

Skonto Stadium, Riga
Attendance: 5,633
Referee: Willy Delajod (France)

Sparta Prague won 2–1 on aggregate.

21 August 2025
19:00

BK Häcken (Sweden)	7–2	(Romania) CFR Cluj
Gustafson 2', 35'; Andersen 18'; Svanbäck 24'; Brusberg 49'; Dembe 61', 70'	Report	Korenica 38'; Cordea 50'

Bravida Arena, Gothenburg
Attendance: 3,173
Referee: Lukas Fähndrich (Switzerland)
28 August 2025
19:30 (20:30 UTC+3)

CFR Cluj (Romania)	1–0	(Sweden) BK Häcken
Păun 48'	Report

Dr. Constantin Rădulescu Stadium, Cluj-Napoca
Attendance: 3,321
Referee: Sebastian Gishamer (Austria)

BK Häcken won 7–3 on aggregate.

21 August 2025
19:00

Wolfsberger AC (Austria)	2–1	(Cyprus) Omonia
Nwaiwu 30'; Zukić 88'	Report	Coulibaly 16'

Wörthersee Stadion, Klagenfurt (Note: Wolfsberger AC played their home matches at the Wörthersee Stadion, in Klagenfurt, instead of their regular venue, the Lavanttal-Arena, in Wolfsberg, which did not meet UEFA requirements.)
Attendance: 3,154
Referee: António Nobre (Portugal)
28 August 2025
18:00 (19:00 UTC+3)

Omonia (Cyprus)	1–0 (a.e.t.)	(Austria) Wolfsberger AC
Semedo 39'	Report
Penalties
Stępiński (penalty scored); Coulibaly (penalty scored); Eraković (penalty scored); Chatzigiovanis (penalty scored); Kousoulos (penalty scored)	5–4	(penalty scored) Zukić; (penalty scored) Schöpf; (penalty missed) Pink; (penalty scored) Baumgartner; (penalty scored) Gattermayer

GSP Stadium, Nicosia
Attendance: 14,582
Referee: Daniele Chiffi (Italy)

2–2 on aggregate; Omonia won 5–4 on penalties.
