= Isak Jensen =

Danish footballer (born 2003)

Personal information
- Full name: Isak Steiner Jensen
- Date of birth: 23 December 2003 (age 22)
- Place of birth: Odense, Denmark
- Height: 1.86 m (6 ft 1 in)
- Position: Winger

Team information
- Current team: Lorient (on loan from AZ)
- Number: 10

Youth career
- Næsby
- OB
- SønderjyskE

Senior career*
| Years | Team | Apps | (Gls) |
| 2021–2022 | SønderjyskE | 19 | (0) |
| 2022–2023 | St. Louis City 2 | 15 | (1) |
| 2023–2024 | St. Louis City | 11 | (0) |
| 2023–2024 | → Viborg (loan) | 25 | (7) |
| 2024–2025 | Viborg | 27 | (9) |
| 2025– | AZ | 33 | (2) |
| 2026– | → Lorient (loan) | 2 | (0) |

International career^{‡}
| 2020 | Denmark U18 | 2 | (1) |
| 2021–2022 | Denmark U19 | 5 | (1) |
| 2024–2025 | Denmark U21 | 10 | (1) |
- * Club domestic league appearances and goals as of 5 September 2026 ‡ National team caps and goals as of 16:14, 22 June 2025 (UTC)

Isak Steiner Jensen (born 23 December 2003) is a Danish professional footballer who plays as a winger for Ligue 1 club Lorient on loan from Eredivisie club AZ Alkmaar.

== Career ==
=== SønderjyskE ===
At youth level, Jensen played for Næsby and OB before he joined SønderjyskE.

Jensen was already training continuously with the first-team squad at age 16 and on 20 November 2020, he signed a three-year contract with the club. 17-year old Jensen got his official debut for SønderjyskE against Fremad Amager in a Danish Cup game. This was his only appearance in the 2020–21 season.

In the 2021–22 season, he got his debut in the Danish Superliga age 17 in a match against Randers FC on 8 August 2021.

=== St. Louis City ===
On 11 July 2022, it was confirmed that Jensen had been sold to American MLS side St. Louis City, who would begin play in the 2023 season, with the player signing a deal until the end of 2026, with an option for one further year.

=== Viborg FF ===
On 30 August 2023, Danish Superliga club Viborg FF confirmed that they had loaned Jensen from St. Louis City for the 2023–24 season, with an option to buy at the end of the loan. The loan move proved to be successful as he scored seven goals from 27 appearances for the club, playing a key role in their late-season success. His first goal for the club came on 1 October, as Viborg defeated AGF 2–1.

On 25 May 2024, it was confirmed by Viborg that they had decided to exercise their option to purchase Jensen. He signed a three-year contract with the club.

Jensen made his first appearance in the 2024–25 season in Viborg's opening fixture on 21 July 2024, scoring once in a 3–3 draw against Brøndby. On 17 April 2025, he scored a goal from a direct free kick in a 3–3 draw against Vejle, earning him the Superliga Goal of the Month for April. It was his third goal from a direct free kick in five days, having scored twice against Silkeborg on 13 April.

=== AZ Alkmaar ===
In July 2025, Jensen was signed by Eredivisie side AZ Alkmaar on a five-year deal. He made his debut for the club as part of their 2025–26 UEFA Conference League qualifying, appearing in both legs of an 8–4 aggregate victory over Finnish club Ilves.

==== Loan to Lorient ====
On 24 August 2026, Jensen joined Ligue 1 side Lorient on loan with an option to buy.

== Career statistics ==
As of match played 15 August 2026

Appearances and goals by club, season and competition
| Club | Season | League | | | National cup (Note: Includes Danish Cup, US Open Cup, KNVB Cup) | | Continental | | Total | |
| Club | Season | Division | Apps | Goals | Apps | Goals | Apps | Goals | Apps | Goals |
|---|---|---|---|---|---|---|---|---|---|---|
| SønderjyskE | 2020–21 | Danish Superliga | 0 | 0 | 1 | 0 | — | | 1 | 0 |
| SønderjyskE | 2021–22 | Danish Superliga | 19 | 0 | 4 | 0 | — | | 23 | 0 |
| SønderjyskE | Total | | 19 | 0 | 5 | 0 | — | | 24 | 0 |
| St. Louis City 2 | 2022 | MLS Next Pro | 7 | 0 | — | | — | | 7 | 0 |
| St. Louis City 2 | 2023 | MLS Next Pro | 8 | 1 | — | | — | | 8 | 1 |
| St. Louis City 2 | Total | | 15 | 1 | — | | — | | 15 | 1 |
| St. Louis City | 2023 | MLS | 11 | 0 | 2 | 0 | — | | 13 | 0 |
| Viborg (loan) | 2023–24 | Danish Superliga | 25 | 7 | 2 | 0 | — | | 27 | 7 |
| Viborg | 2024–25 | Danish Superliga | 27 | 9 | 6 | 2 | — | | 33 | 11 |
| AZ | 2025–26 | Eredivisie | 33 | 2 | 5 | 0 | 17 (Note: Appearances in UEFA Conference League) | 5 | 55 | 7 |
| AZ | 2026–27 | Eresivisie | 0 | 0 | 0 | 0 | 0 | 0 | 0 | 0 |
| AZ | Total | | 33 | 2 | 5 | 0 | 17 | 5 | 55 | 7 |
| Career total | | | 130 | 19 | 19 | 2 | 17 | 5 | 167 | 26 |

== Honours ==
AZ

- KNVB Cup: 2025–26
- Johan Cruyff Shield: 2026
