= Mykola Balakin =

Ukrainian football referee

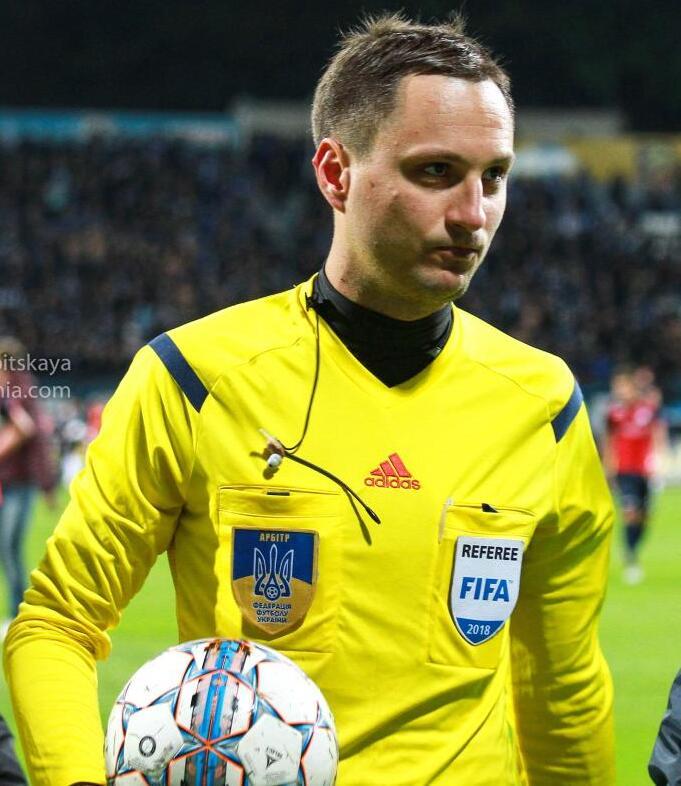
- Mykola Balakin in 2018
- Born: January 5, 1989 (age 37); Kyiv, Ukraine
- Occupation: Football referee

Mykola Oleksandrovych Balakin (born 5 January 1989) is a Ukrainian football referee who officiates in the Ukrainian Premier League and in international competitions under the authority of FIFA and UEFA. He is currently listed in the UEFA First Category.

== Refereeing career ==
Balakin has been active as a referee in the Ukrainian top division, the Premier League, where he has officiated many matches involving the nation's top clubs. He became FIFA‑listed in 2017, enabling him to officiate in international club and national team competitions. He regularly referees matches in the VBET Ukrainian Premier League; he was appointed referee for the Dynamo Kyiv vs LNZ Cherkasy match in November 2025. In addition, he officiated other high‑profile league fixtures such as Dynamo Kyiv vs Shakhtar Donetsk and Dynamo vs Karpaty Lviv. Balakin was appointed as the referee for the 2024–25 Ukrainian Cup Final between Shakhtar Donetsk and Dynamo Kyiv.

He has also refereed Premier League matches such as Shakhtar Donetsk vs Oleksandriya in March 2025. Balakin has been appointed as a referee in UEFA club competitions. He was selected as the main referee for a UEFA Champions League group stage match between Sturm Graz and RB Leipzig in January 2025.

Noticeably, he has also refereed UEFA Europa League playoff matches, including a tie between Bodø/Glimt and Olympiacos in March 2025. In the 2024–2025 season, Balakin officiated another UEFA Champions League fixture, acting as referee in the match between Bayer Leverkusen and Red Bull Salzburg.

Balakin also worked as a fourth official in the 2024 UEFA Super Cup between Real Madrid and Atalanta.
