= Republic of Ireland football clubs in European competitions =

League of Ireland clubs have participated in European football competitions since the 1957–58 European Cup, where Shamrock Rovers were eliminated in the preliminary round by Manchester United. In total, 19 clubs have represented the Republic of Ireland in European competition.

== Statistics ==
As of 24 July 2025

European Cup / UEFA Champions League

- First game played: Shamrock Rovers 0-6 Manchester United, 25 September 1957 (1957–58 European Cup preliminary round, first leg)
- Most competitions appeared in: 13 - Shamrock Rovers
- Most games played: 33 - Dundalk
- Most wins: 5 - Shamrock Rovers / Shelbourne
- Most draws: 12 - Dundalk
- Most defeats: 19 - Shamrock Rovers

Inter-Cities Fairs Cup / UEFA Cup / UEFA Europa League

- First game played: Drumcondra Dublin 4-1 Odense XI, 3 October 1962 (1962–63 Inter-Cities Fairs Cup first round, first leg)
- Most competitions appeared in: 15 - Shamrock Rovers / Bohemians
- Most games played: 50 - Shamrock Rovers
- Most wins: 13 - Shamrock Rovers
- Most draws: 10 - Bohemians
- Most defeats: 28 - Shamrock Rovers

UEFA Conference League

- First game played: Dundalk 4-0 Newtown, 8 July 2021 (2021-22 UEFA Europa Conference League first qualifying round, first leg)
- Most competitions appeared in: 5 - Shamrock Rovers
- Most games played: 20 - Shamrock Rovers
- Most wins: 6 - Shamrock Rovers
- Most draws: 4 - Shamrock Rovers
- Most defeats: 10 - Shamrock Rovers

European Cup Winners Cup / UEFA Cup Winners Cup

- First game played: Dunfermline Athletic 4-1 St. Patrick's Athletic, 12 September 1961 (1961-62 European Cup Winners' Cup first round, first leg)
- Most competitions appeared in: 6 - Shamrock Rovers
- Most games played: 16 - Shamrock Rovers
- Most wins: 5 - Shamrock Rovers
- Most draws: 2 - Shamrock Rovers / Bohemians
- Most defeats: 9 - Shamrock Rovers

UEFA Intertoto Cup

- First game played: Bohemians 0-2 Odense, 24 June 1995 (1995 UEFA Intertoto Cup group stage)
- Most competitions appeared in: 4 - Cork City
- Most games played: 16 - Cork City
- Most wins: 4 - Bohemians / Cork City
- Most draws: 6 - Cork City
- Most defeats: 6 - Bohemians / Cork City

Overall

- First game played: Shamrock Rovers 0-6 Manchester United, 25 September 1957 (1957–58 European Cup preliminary round, first leg)
- Most competitions appeared in: 41 - Shamrock Rovers
- Most games played: 124 - Shamrock Rovers
- Most wins: 32 - Shamrock Rovers
- Most draws: 23 - Shamrock Rovers / Dundalk
- Most defeats: 69 - Shamrock Rovers
- Biggest winning margin (match): 5 goals - Aberystwyth Town 0-5 Derry City (2014-15 UEFA Europa League first qualifying round)
- Biggest winning margin (aggregate): 9 goals - Derry City 9-0 Aberystwyth Town (2014-15 UEFA Europa League first qualifying round)
- Heaviest defeat (match): 12 goals - Derby County 12-0 Finn Harps (1976-77 UEFA Cup first round)
- Heaviest defeat (aggregate): 15 goals - Finn Harps 1-16 Derby County (1976-77 UEFA Cup first round)

=== UEFA coefficient and ranking ===
For the 2026-27 UEFA competitions, the associations will be allocated places according to their 2025 UEFA association coefficient, which is based on their clubs' performances in UEFA club competitions between the 2020-21 season and the 2024-25 season. In the 2025 rankings used to allocate berths for the 2026-27 European competitions, the Republic of Ireland's coefficient points total will be 14.968. After earning a score 5.343 points during the 2024-25 European campaign, the Republic of Ireland climbed 4 places to 31st out of 55 in the rankings, earning them a spot in the 2026-27 UEFA Europa League first qualifying round.

Rank	Nation	Points
29	Bulgaria	19.875
30	Azerbaijan	19.625
31	Republic of Ireland	14.968
32	Moldova	14.5
33	Iceland	13.52

- Full list

== Appearances in UEFA competitions ==
=== Overview of clubs ===
As of 24 July 2025

Club	UEFA Champions League					UEFA Europa League (including Inter-Cities Fairs Cup)					UEFA Europa Conference League					UEFA Cup Winners' Cup					UEFA Intertoto Cup					Total				
Club	Apps	P	W	D	L	Apps	P	W	D	L	Apps	P	W	D	L	Apps	P	W	D	L	Apps	P	W	D	L	Apps	P	W	D	L
Shamrock Rovers	13	32	5	8	19	15	50	13	9	28	5	26	9	6	11	6	16	5	2	9	2	6	3	0	3	41	130	35	25	70
Dundalk	12	33	4	12	17	12	43	10	6	27	2	9	4	3	2	3	8	2	1	5	0	0	0	0	0	29	94	20	23	51
Bohemians	6	18	4	4	10	15	31	3	10	18	1	6	4	1	1	3	8	2	2	4	3	10	4	0	6	28	73	17	17	39
St. Patrick's Athletic	4	8	0	3	5	12	42	10	7	25	4	18	7	5	6	1	2	0	0	2	1	4	2	0	2	22	74	19	15	40
Shelbourne	7	24	5	9	10	8	19	2	4	13	1	4	1	2	1	4	10	1	1	8	3	6	3	1	2	23	65	14	17	34
Cork City	3	10	2	1	7	11	32	7	7	18	0	0	0	0	0	2	4	1	0	3	4	16	4	6	6	20	62	14	14	34
Derry City (Note: Derry City played in Northern Irish football until 1985, when they joined the League of Ireland and now represent the Republic of Ireland in European competition.)	3	6	0	1	5	10	26	7	5	14	3	10	4	2	4	2	4	1	1	2	0	0	0	0	0	18	46	12	9	25
Sligo Rovers	2	4	0	0	4	4	10	2	4	4	2	8	4	0	4	2	6	1	1	4	1	4	0	2	2	11	32	7	7	20
Waterford	6	14	3	0	11	0	0	0	0	0	0	0	0	0	0	3	8	1	1	6	0	0	0	0	0	9	22	4	1	17
Limerick	2	4	0	0	4	1	2	0	1	1	0	0	0	0	0	3	6	0	1	5	0	0	0	0	0	6	12	0	2	10
Drogheda United	1	4	2	1	1	4	12	3	4	5	0	0	0	0	0	0	0	0	0	0	0	0	0	0	0	5	16	5	5	6
Drumcondra	3	6	1	0	5	2	6	2	0	4	0	0	0	0	0	0	0	0	0	0	0	0	0	0	0	5	12	3	0	9
Cork Hibernians	1	2	0	0	2	1	2	0	0	2	0	0	0	0	0	2	6	2	1	3	0	0	0	0	0	4	10	2	1	7
Finn Harps	0	0	0	0	0	3	6	0	0	6	0	0	0	0	0	1	2	0	1	1	0	0	0	0	0	4	8	0	1	7
Longford Town	0	0	0	0	0	3	6	1	1	4	0	0	0	0	0	0	0	0	0	0	0	0	0	0	0	3	6	1	1	4
Bray Wanderers	0	0	0	0	0	1	2	0	0	2	0	0	0	0	0	1	2	0	1	1	0	0	0	0	0	2	4	0	1	3
Cork Celtic	1	2	0	0	2	0	0	0	0	0	0	0	0	0	0	1	2	0	1	1	0	0	0	0	0	2	4	0	1	3
Home Farm	0	0	0	0	0	0	0	0	0	0	0	0	0	0	0	1	2	0	1	1	0	0	0	0	0	1	2	0	1	1
Sporting Fingal	0	0	0	0	0	1	2	0	0	2	0	0	0	0	0	0	0	0	0	0	0	0	0	0	0	1	2	0	0	2
Total	64	167	26	39	102	103	291	60	58	173	18	81	33	19	29	35	86	16	15	55	14	46	16	9	21	234	671	151	140	380

Indicates clubs that are still active in this season's UEFA Champions League.
Indicates clubs that are still active in this season's UEFA Europa League.
Indicates clubs that are still active in this season's UEFA Conference League.

=== Active competitions ===
==== European Cup / UEFA Champions League ====
Season	Club	Round	Opponent	Home	Away	Aggregate
European Cup
1957-58	Shamrock Rovers	PR	(England) Manchester United	0-6	2-3	2-9
1958-59	Drumcondra	PR	(Spain) Atlético Madrid	1-5	0-8	1-13
1959-60	Shamrock Rovers	PR	(France) Nice	1-1	2-3	3-4
1960-61	Limerick	PR	(Switzerland) Young Boys	0-5	2-4	2-9
1961-62	Drumcondra	PR	(Germany) 1. FC Nürnberg	1-4	0-5	1-9
1962-63	Shelbourne	PR	(Portugal) Sporting CP	0-2	1-5	1-7
1963-64	Dundalk	PR	(Switzerland) Zürich	0-3	2-1	2-4
1964-65	Shamrock Rovers	PR	(Austria) Rapid Wien	0-2	0-3	0-5
1965-66	Drumcondra	PR	(East Germany) Vorwärts Berlin	1–0	0–3	1–3
1966-67	Waterford	PR	(East Germany) Vorwärts Berlin	1–6	0–6	1–12
1967-68	Dundalk	1R	(Hungary) Vasas	0-1	1-8	1-9
1968-69	Waterford	1R	(England) Manchester United	1–3	1–7	2–10
1969-70	Waterford	1R	(Turkey) Galatasaray	2–3	0–2	2–5
1970–71	Waterford	1R	(Northern Ireland) Glentoran	1–0	3–1	4–1
1970–71	Waterford	2R	(Scotland) Celtic	0–7	2–3	2–10
1971-72	Cork Hibernians	1R	(Germany) Borussia Mönchengladbach	0-5	1-2	1-7
1972–73	Waterford	1R	(Cyprus) Omonia	0–2	2–1	2–3
1973–74	Waterford	1R	(Hungary) Újpest	2–3	0–3	2–6
1974–75	Cork Celtic	1R	(Cyprus) Omonia	w/o		
1974–75	Cork Celtic	2R	(Soviet Union) Ararat Yerevan	1–2	0–5	2–7
1975–76	Bohemians	1R	(Scotland) Rangers	1–4	1–1	2–5
1976-77	Dundalk	1R	(Netherlands) PSV Eindhoven	1–1	0–6	1–7
1977-78	Sligo Rovers	1R	(Socialist Federal Republic of Yugoslavia) Crvena Zvezda	0-3	0-3	0-6
1978-79	Bohemians	1R	(Cyprus) Omonia	1-0	1-2	2-2 (a)
1978-79	Bohemians	2R	(East Germany) Dynamo Dresden	0-0	0-6	0-6
1979-80	Dundalk	PR	(Northern Ireland) Linfield	1-1	2-0	3-1
1979-80	Dundalk	1R	(Malta) Hibernians	2-0	0-1	2-1
1979-80	Dundalk	2R	(Scotland) Celtic	0-0	2-3	2-3
1980-81	Limerick	1R	(Spain) Real Madrid	1-2	1-5	2-7
1981-82	Athlone Town	PR	(Denmark) KB	2-2	1-1	3-3 (a)
1982-83	Dundalk	1R	(England) Liverpool	1-4	0-1	1-5
1983-84	Athlone Town	1R	(Belgium) Standard Liège	2-3	2-8	4-11
1984-85	Shamrock Rovers	1R	(Northern Ireland) Linfield	1-1	0-0	1-1 (a)
1985-86	Shamrock Rovers	1R	(Hungary) Budapest Honvéd	1-3	0-2	1-5
1986-87	Shamrock Rovers	1R	(Scotland) Celtic	0-1	0-2	0-3
1987-88	Shamrock Rovers	1R	(Cyprus) Omonia	0-1	0-0	0-1
1988-89	Dundalk	1R	(Socialist Federal Republic of Yugoslavia) Crvena Zvezda	0-5	0-3	0-8
1989-90	Derry City (Note: Derry City had previously represented Northern Ireland in the 1966-67 European Cup.)	1R	(Portugal) Benfica	1-2	0-4	1-6
1990-91	St. Patrick's Athletic	1R	(Romania) Dinamo Bucureşti	1-1	0-4	1-5
1991-92	Dundalk	1R	(Hungary) Kispest Honvéd	0-2	1-1	1-3
UEFA Champions League
1992-93	Shelbourne	PR	(Ukraine) SC Tavriya Simferopol	0-0	1-2	1-2
1993-94	Cork City	PR	(Wales) Cwmbrân Town	2-1	2-3	4-4 (a)
1993-94	Cork City	1R	(Turkey) Galatasaray	0-1	1-2	1-3
1994-95	None entered (Note: No clubs entered the Champions League during these seasons as a result of restructuring by UEFA, with entry to the competition limited to the continent's top 24 countries. The league champions entered the UEFA Cup instead.)					
1995-96	None entered					
1996-97	None entered					
1997-98	Derry City	1QR	(Slovenia) Maribor	0-2	0-1	0-3
1998-99	St. Patrick's Athletic	1QR	(Scotland) Celtic	0-2	0-0	0-2
1999-2000	St. Patrick's Athletic	1QR	(Moldova) Zimbru Chișinău	0-5	0-5	0-10
2000-01	Shelbourne	1QR	(North Macedonia) Sloga Jugomagnat	1-1	1-0	2-1
2000-01	Shelbourne	2QR	(Norway) Rosenborg	1-1	1-3	2-4
2001-02	Bohemians	1QR	(Estonia) Levadia Maardu	3-0	0-0	3-0
2001-02	Bohemians	2QR	(Sweden) Halmstads	1-2	0-2	1-4
2002-03	Shelbourne	1QR	(Malta) Hibernians	0-1	2-2	2-3
2003-04	Bohemians	1QR	(Belarus) BATE Borisov	3-0	0-1	3-1
2003-04	Bohemians	2QR	(Norway) Rosenborg	0-1	0-4	0-5
2004-05	Shelbourne	1QR	(Iceland) KR	0-0	2-2	2-2 (a)
2004-05	Shelbourne	2QR	(Croatia) Hajduk Split	2-0	2-3	4-3
2004-05	Shelbourne	3QR	(Spain) Deportivo La Coruña	0-0	0-3	0-3
2005-06	Shelbourne	1QR	(Northern Ireland) Glentoran	4-1	2-1	6-2
2005-06	Shelbourne	2QR	(Romania) Steaua București	0-0	1-4	1-4
2006-07	Cork City	1QR	(Cyprus) Apollon Limassol	1-0	1-1	2-1
2006-07	Cork City	2QR	(Serbia) Crvena Zvezda	0-1	0-3	0-4
2007-08	Derry City	1QR	(Armenia) Pyunik	0-0	0-2	0-2
2008-09	Drogheda United	1QR	(Estonia) Levadia Tallinn	2-1	1-0	3-1
2008-09	Drogheda United	2QR	(Ukraine) Dynamo Kyiv	1-2	2-2	3-4
2009-10	Bohemians	2QR	(Austria) Red Bull Salzburg	0-1	1-1	1-2
2010-11	Bohemians	2QR	(Wales) The New Saints	1-0	0-4	1-4
2011-12	Shamrock Rovers	2QR	(Estonia) Flora	1-0	0-0	1-0
2011-12	Shamrock Rovers	3QR	(Denmark) Copenhagen	0-2	0-1	0-3
2012-13	Shamrock Rovers	2QR	(Lithuania) Ekranas	0-0	1-2	1-2
2013-14	Sligo Rovers	2QR	(Norway) Molde	0-1	0-2	0-3
2014-15	St. Patrick's Athletic	2QR	(Poland) Legia Warsaw	0-5	1-1	1-6
2015-16	Dundalk	2QR	(Moldova) BATE Borisov	0-0	1-2	1-2
2016-17	Dundalk	2QR	(Iceland) FH	1-1	2-2	3-3 (a)
2016-17	Dundalk	3QR	(Moldova) BATE Borisov	3-0	0-1	3-1
2016-17	Dundalk	QPO	(Poland) Legia Warsaw	0-2	1-1	1-3
2017-18	Dundalk	2QR	(Norway) Rosenborg	1-1	1-2	2-3
2018-19	Cork City	1QR	(Poland) Legia Warsaw	0-1	0-3	0-4
2019-20	Dundalk	1QR	(Latvia) Riga	0-0	0-0	0-0 (5-4 p)
2019-20	Dundalk	2QR	(Azerbaijan) Qarabağ	1-1	0-3	1-4
2020-21	Dundalk	1QR	(Slovenia) Celje	—N/a	0-3	0-3
2021-22	Shamrock Rovers	1QR	(Slovakia) Slovan Bratislava	2-1	0-2	2-3
2022-23	Shamrock Rovers	1QR	(Malta) Hibernians	3-0	0-0	3-0
2022-23	Shamrock Rovers	2QR	(Bulgaria) Ludogorets Razgrad	2-1	0-3	2-4
2023-24	Shamrock Rovers	1QR	(Iceland) Breiðablik	0-1	1-2	1-3
2024-25	Shamrock Rovers	1QR	(Iceland) Víkingur Reykjavík	2-1	0-0	2-1
2024-25	Shamrock Rovers	2QR	(Czech Republic) Sparta Prague	0-2	2-4	2-6
2025-26	Shelbourne	1QR	(Northern Ireland) Linfield	1-0	1-1	2-1
2025-26	Shelbourne	2QR	(Azerbaijan) Qarabağ	0-3	0-1	0-4
2026-27	Shamrock Rovers	1QR	(Malta) Floriana	5-1	0-2	5-3
2026-27	Shamrock Rovers	2QR	Ararat-Armenia	2-1	0-2	2-3

==== Inter-Cities Fairs Cup / UEFA Cup / UEFA Europa League ====
Season	Club	Round	Opponent	Home	Away	Aggregate
Inter-Cities Fairs Cup
1962-63	Drumcondra	1R	(Denmark) Odense XI	4-1	2-4	6-5
1962-63	Drumcondra	2R	(Germany) Bayern Munich	1-0	0-6	1-6
1963-64	Shamrock Rovers	1R	(Spain) Valencia	0-1	2-2	2-3
1964-65	Shelbourne	1R	(Portugal) Beleneses	0-0	1-1	1-1 (2-1 Play-off)
1964-65	Shelbourne	2R	(Spain) Atlético Madrid	0-1	0-1	0-2
1965-66	Shamrock Rovers	2R	(Spain) Zaragoza	1-1	1-2	2-3
1966-67	Drumcondra	1R	(Germany) Eintracht Frankfurt	0-2	1-6	1-8
1967-68	St. Patrick's Athletic	1R	(France) FC Girondins de Bordeaux	1-3	3-6	4-9
1968-69	Dundalk	1R	(Netherlands) DOS Utrecht	2-1	1-1	3-2
1968-69	Dundalk	2R	(Scotland) Rangers	0-3	1-6	1-9
1969-70	Dundalk	1R	(England) Liverpool	0-4	0-10	0-14
1970-71	Cork Hibernians	1R	(Spain) Valencia	0-3	1-3	1-6
UEFA Cup
1971-72	Shelbourne	1R	(Hungary) Vasas	1-1	0-1	1-2
1972-73	Bohemians	1R	(Germany) Köln	0-3	1-2	1-5
1973-74	Finn Harps	1R	(Scotland) Aberdeen	1-3	1-4	2-7
1974-75	Bohemians	1R	(Germany) Hamburg	0-1	0-3	094
1975-76	Athlone Town	1R	(Norway) Vålerengen	3-1	1-1	4-2
1975-76	Athlone Town	2R	(Italy) Milan	0-0	0-3	0-3
1976-77	Finn Harps	1R	(England) Derby County	1-4	0-12	1-16
1977-78	Bohemians	1R	(England) Newcastle United	0-0	0-4	0-4
1978-79	Finn Harps	1R	(England) Everton	0-5	0-5	0-10
1979-80	Bohemians	1R	(Portugal) Sporting CP	0-0	0-2	0-2
1980-81	Dundalk	1R	(Portugal) Porto	0-0	0-1	0-1
1981-82	Limerick United	1R	(England) Southampton	0-3	1-1	1-4
1982-83	Shamrock Rovers	1R	(Iceland) Fram	0-4	0-3	0-7
1982-83	Shamrock Rovers	2R	(Romania) Universitatea Craiova	0-2	0-3	0-5
1983-84	Drogheda United	1R	(England) Tottenham Hotspur	0-6	0-8	0-14
1984-85	Bohemians	1R	(Scotland) Rangers	3-2	0-2	3-4
1985-86	Bohemians	1R	(Scotland) Dundee United	2-5	2-2	4-7
1986-87	Galway United	1R	(Netherlands) FC Groningen	1-3	1-5	2-8
1987-88	Bohemians	1R	(Scotland) Aberdeen	0-0	0-1	0-1
1988-89	St. Patrick's Athletic	1R	(Scotland) Hearts	0-2	0-2	0-4
1989-90	Dundalk	1R	(Switzerland) Wettingen	0-2	0-3	0-5
1990-91	Derry City	1R	(Netherlands) Vitesse	0-1	0-0	0-1
1991-92	Cork City	1R	(Germany) Bayern Munich	1-1	0-2	1-3
1992-93	Derry City	1R	(Netherlands) Vitesse	1-2	0-3	1-5
1993-94	Bohemians	1R	(France) Bordeaux	0-1	0-5	0-6
1994-95	Shamrock Rovers	PR	(Poland) Górnik Zabrze	0-1	0-7	0-8
1994-95	Cork City	PR	(Czech Republic) Slavia Prague	0-4	0-2	0-6
1995-96	Dundalk	PR	(Sweden) Malmö FF	0-2	0-2	0-4
1995-96	Shamrock Rovers	PR	(Iceland) ÍA	0-3	0-3	0-6
1996-97	Bohemians	PR	(Belgium) Dinamo Minsk	1-1	0-0	1-1 (a)
1996-97	St. Patrick's Athletic	PR	(Slovakia) Slovan Bratislava	3-4	0-1	3-5
1997-98	Bohemians	1QR	(Hungary) Ferencváros	0-1	0-5	0-6
1998-99	Shelbourne	1QR	(Scotland) Rangers	3-5	0-1	3-7
1990-2000	Bray Wanderers	QR	(Switzerland) Grasshopper	0-4	0-4	0-8
1990-2000	Cork City	QR	(Sweden) IFK Göteborg	1-0	0-3	1-3
2000-01	Bohemians	QR	(Scotland) Aberdeen	0-1	1-2	2-2 (a)
2000-01	Bohemians	1R	(Germany) 1. FC Kaiserslautern	1-3	1-0	2-3
2000-01	Cork City	QR	(Switzerland) Lausanne-Sports	0-1	0-1	0-2
2001-02	Longford Town	QR	(Bulgaria) Litex Lovech	1-1	0-2	1-3
2001-02	Shelbourne	QR	(Denmark) Brøndby	0-3	0-2	0-5
2002-03	Shamrock Rovers	QR	(Sweden) Djurgårdens IF	1-3	0-2	1-5
2002-03	Dundalk	QR	(Croatia) Varteks	0-4	0-5	0-9
2003-04	Derry City	QR	(Cyprus) APOEL	0-3	1-2	1-5
2003-04	Shelbourne	QR	(Slovenia) Olimpija Ljubljana	2-3	0-1	2-4
2004-05	Bohemians	1QR	(Estonia) Levadia Tallinn	1-3	0-0	1-3
2004-05	Longford Town	1QR	(Liechtenstein) Vaduz	2-3	0-1	2-4
2004-05	Shelbourne	1R	(France) Lille OSC	2-2	0-2	2-4
2005-06	Longford Town	1QR	(Wales) Carmarthen Town	2-0	1-5	3-5
2005-06	Cork City	1QR	(Lithuania) Ekranas	0-1	2-0	2-1
2005-06	Cork City	2QR	(Sweden) Djurgårdens IF	0-0	1-1	1-1 (a)
2005-06	Cork City	1R	(Czech Republic) Slavia Prague	1-2	0-2	1-4
2006-07	Drogheda United	1QR	(Finland) HJK	3-1	1-1	2-4
2006-07	Drogheda United	2QR	(Norway) IK Start	1-0	0-1	1-1 (10-11 p)
2006-07	Derry City	1QR	(Sweden) IFK Göteborg	1-0	1-0	2-0
2006-07	Derry City	2QR	(Scotland) Gretna F.C.	2-2	5-1	7-3
2006-07	Derry City	1R	(France) Paris Saint-Germain	0-0	0-2	0-2
2007-08	Drogheda United	1QR	(San Marino) Libertas	3-0	1-1	4-1
2007-08	Drogheda United	2QR	(Sweden) Helsingborgs IF	1-1	0-3	1-4
2007-08	St. Patrick's Athletic	1QR	(Denmark) Odense	0-0	0-5	0-5
2008-09	Cork City	1QR	(Finland) Haka	2-2	0-4	2-6
2008-09	St. Patrick's Athletic	1QR	(Latvia) Olimps/ASK	2-0	1-0	3-0
2008-09	St. Patrick's Athletic	1QR	(Sweden) IF Elfsborg	2-1	2-2	4-3
2008-09	St. Patrick's Athletic	1R	(Germany) Hertha BSC	0-0	2-0	2-0
UEFA Europa League
2025–26	Shelbourne	3QR	(Croatia) Rijeka	1–3	2–1	3–4
2026–27	Derry City	1QR	(Bulgaria) CSKA Sofia	1–2	2–3	3–5
2026–27	Shamrock Rovers	3QR	(Albania) Egnatia	3–1	1–5	4–6

==== UEFA Europa Conference League / UEFA Conference League ====
Season	Club	Round	Opponent	Home	Away	Aggregate
UEFA Europa Conference League
2021-22	Sligo Rovers	1QR	(Iceland) FH	1-2	0-1	1-3
2021-22	Bohemians	1QR	(Iceland) Stjarnan	3-0	1-1	4-1
2021-22	Bohemians	2QR	(Luxembourg) F91 Dudelange	3-0	1-0	4-0
2021-22	Bohemians	3QR	(Greece) PAOK	2-1	0-2	2-3
2021-22	Dundalk	1QR	(Wales) Newtown	4-0	1-0	5-0
2021-22	Dundalk	2QR	(Estonia) FCI Levadia	2-2	2-1	4-3
2021-22	Dundalk	3QR	(Netherlands) Vitesse	1-2	2-2	3-4
2021-22	Shamrock Rovers	2QR	bye			
2021-22	Shamrock Rovers	3QR	(Albania) Teuta	1-0	2-0	3-0
2021-22	Shamrock Rovers	QPO	(Estonia) Flora	0-1	2-4	2-5
2022-23	Derry City	1QR	(Latvia) Riga	0-2	0-2	0-4
2022-23	Sligo Rovers	1QR	(Wales) Bala Town	0-1	2-1	2-2 (4-3 p)
2022-23	Sligo Rovers	2QR	(Scotland) Motherwell	2-0	1-0	3-0
2022-23	Sligo Rovers	3QR	(Norway) Viking	1-0	1-5	2-5
2022-23	St. Patrick's Athletic	2QR	(Slovenia) Mura	1-1	0-0	1-1 (6-5 p)
2022-23	St. Patrick's Athletic	3QR	(Bulgaria) CSKA Sofia	0-2	1-0	1-2
2022-23	Shamrock Rovers	GS	(Sweden) Djurgårdens IF	0-0	0-1	4th out of 4 teams
2022-23	Shamrock Rovers	GS	(Belgium) Gent	1-1	0-3	4th out of 4 teams
2022-23	Shamrock Rovers	GS	(Norway) Molde	0-2	0-3	4th out of 4 teams
2023-24	Dundalk	1QR	(Gibraltar) Bruno's Magpies	3-1	0-0	3-1
2023-24	Dundalk	2QR	(Iceland) KA	2-2	1-3	3-5
2023-24	Derry City	1QR	(Faroe Islands) HA	1-0	0-0	1-0
2023-24	Derry City	2QR	(Finland) KuPS	2-1	3-3	5-4
2023-24	Derry City	3QR	(Kazakhstan) Tobol	1-0	0-1	1-1 (5-6 p)
2023-24	St. Patrick's Athletic	1QR	(Luxembourg) F91 Dudelange	2-3	1-2	3-5
2023-24	Shamrock Rovers	2QR	(Hungary) Ferencváros	0-2	0-4	0-6
UEFA Conference League
2024-25	Derry City	1QR	(Gibraltar) Bruno's Magpies	2-1	0-2	2-3
2024-25	Shelbourne	1QR	(Gibraltar) St Joseph's	2-1	1-1	3-2
2024-25	Shelbourne	2QR	(Switzerland) Zürich	0-0	0-3	0-3
2024-25	St. Patrick's Athletic	2QR	(Liechtenstein) Vaduz	3-1	2-2	5-3
2024-25	St. Patrick's Athletic	3QR	(Azerbaijan) Sabah	1-0	1-0	2-0
2024-25	St. Patrick's Athletic	QPO	(Turkey) İstanbul Başakşehir	0-0	0-2	0-2
2024-25	Shamrock Rovers	LP	(Cyprus) APOEL	1-1	—N/a	10th out of 36
2024-25	Shamrock Rovers	LP	(Northern Ireland) Larne	—N/a	4-1	10th out of 36
2024-25	Shamrock Rovers	LP	(Wales) The New Saints	2-1	—N/a	10th out of 36
2024-25	Shamrock Rovers	LP	(Austria) Rapid Wien	—N/a	1-1	10th out of 36
2024-25	Shamrock Rovers	LP	(Bosnia and Herzegovina) Borac Banja Luka	3-0	—N/a	10th out of 36
2024-25	Shamrock Rovers	LP	(England) Chelsea	—N/a	1-5	10th out of 36
2024-25	Shamrock Rovers	KPO	(Norway) Molde	0-1	1-0	1-1 (4-5 p)
2025-26	St. Patrick's Athletic	1QR	(Lithuania) Hegelmann	1-0	2-0	3-0
2025-26	St. Patrick's Athletic	2QR	(Estonia) Nõmme Kalju	1-0	2-2 (a.e.t.)	3-2
2025-26	St. Patrick's Athletic	3QR	(Turkey) Beşiktaş	1-4	2-3	3-7
2025-26	Shamrock Rovers	2QR	(Gibraltar) St Joseph's	0-0	4-0	4-0
2025-26	Shamrock Rovers	3QR	(Kosovo) Ballkani	4-0	0-1	4-1
2025-26	Shamrock Rovers	QPO	(Portugal) Santa Clara	0-0	2-1	2-1
2025-26	Shamrock Rovers	LP	(Czech Republic) Sparta Prague	—N/a	1-4	31st out of 36
2025-26	Shamrock Rovers	LP	(Slovenia) Celje	0-2	—N/a	31st out of 36
2025-26	Shamrock Rovers	LP	(Greece) AEK Athens	—N/a	1-1	31st out of 36
2025-26	Shamrock Rovers	LP	(Ukraine) Shakhtar Donetsk	1-2	—N/a	31st out of 36
2025-26	Shamrock Rovers	LP	(Iceland) Breiðablik	—N/a	1-3	31st out of 36
2025-26	Shamrock Rovers	LP	(Malta) Hamrun Spartans	3-1	—N/a	31st out of 36
2025-26	Shelbourne	QPO	(Northern Ireland) Linfield	3–1	2–0	5–1
2025-26	Shelbourne	LP	(Sweden) Häcken	0-0	—N/a	34th out of 36
2025-26	Shelbourne	LP	(North Macedonia) Shkëndija	—N/a	0-1	34th out of 36
2025-26	Shelbourne	LP	(Kosovo) Drita	0-1	—N/a	34th out of 36
2025-26	Shelbourne	LP	(Netherlands) AZ Alkmaar	—N/a	0-2	34th out of 36
2025-26	Shelbourne	LP	(England) Crystal Palace	0-3	—N/a	34th out of 36
2025-26	Shelbourne	LP	(Slovenia) Celje	—N/a	0-0	34th out of 36
2026–27	Bohemians	1QR	(Gibraltar) St Joseph's	2–0	0–0	2–0
2026–27	Bohemians	2QR	(Kosovo) Ballkani	2–1	2–3 (a.e.t.)	4–4 (5–4 p)
2026–27	Bohemians	3QR	(Denmark) Midtjylland	0–2	2–3	2–5
2026–27	Derry City	2QR	(Croatia) Rijeka	0–1	0–1	0–2
2026–27	Shelbourne	2QR	(Estonia) Nõmme Kalju	5–2	1–2	6–4
2026–27	Shelbourne	3QR	(Netherlands) Ajax	2–2	1–3	3–5
2026–27	Shamrock Rovers	PO	(Finland) KuPS	1–1	0–1	1–2

== See also ==
- Association football in the Republic of Ireland
- Dundalk F.C. in European football
- Shelbourne F.C. in European football
