= 2025–26 UEFA Conference League qualifying =

European football tournament

2025–26 UEFA Conference League qualifying was the preliminary phase of the 2025–26 UEFA Conference League, prior to the competition proper. Qualification consisted of the qualifying phase (first to third rounds) and the play-off round. It began on 10 July and ended on 28 August 2025.

A total of 155 teams competed in the qualifying system of the 2025–26 UEFA Conference League, which included the qualifying phase and the play-off round, with 21 teams in the Champions Path and 134 teams in the Main Path. The 24 winners of the play-off round advanced to the league phase, to join the 12 losers of the Europa League play-off round.

Times are CEST (UTC+2), as listed by UEFA (local times, if different, are in parentheses).

== Format ==
The qualifying phase and play-off round were split into two paths – the Champions Path and the Main Path. The Champions Path contained teams which were eliminated from the Champions League Champions Path, and the Europa League Champions Path and the Main Path contained teams which qualified through their domestic league or as domestic cup winners, as well as teams eliminated from the Europa League Main Path.

Each tie was played over two legs, with each team playing one leg at home. The team that scored more goals on aggregate over the two legs advanced to the next round. If the aggregate score was level at the end of normal time of the second leg, extra time was played, and if the same number of goals was scored by both teams during extra time, the tie was decided by a penalty shoot-out.

In the draws for each round, teams were seeded based on their UEFA club coefficients at the beginning of the season, with the teams divided into seeded and unseeded pots containing the same number of teams. A seeded team was drawn against an unseeded team, with the order of legs in each tie decided by draw. As the identity of the winners of the previous round may not have been known at the time of the draws, the seeding was carried out under the assumption that the team with the higher coefficient of an undecided tie advanced to the subsequent round, which meant if the team with the lower coefficient advanced, it simply took the seeding of its opponent.

Prior to the draws, UEFA could form "groups" in accordance with the principles set by the Club Competitions Committee, purely for the convenience of the draw and not to resemble any real groupings in the sense of the competition. Teams from associations with political conflicts as decided by UEFA could not be drawn into the same tie. After the draws, the order of legs of a tie could be reversed by UEFA due to scheduling or venue conflicts.

== Schedule ==
The schedule of the competition was as follows. Matches were scheduled for Thursdays, though exceptionally could take place on Tuesdays or Wednesdays due to scheduling conflicts.

Schedule for 2025–26 UEFA Conference League
Round	Draw date	First leg	Second leg
First qualifying round	17 June 2025	10 July 2025	17 July 2025
Second qualifying round	18 June 2025	24 July 2025	31 July 2025
Third qualifying round	21 July 2025	7 August 2025	14 August 2025
Play-off round	4 August 2025	21 August 2025	28 August 2025

== Teams ==
=== Champions Path ===
The Champions Path included league champions which were eliminated from the Champions Path qualifying phase of the Champions League and the Champions Path qualifying phase of the Europa League and consisted of the following rounds:

- Second qualifying round (12 teams): 12 of the 14 losers of the Champions League first qualifying round (two of the teams received a bye to the third qualifying round).
- Third qualifying round (8 teams): 6 winners of the second qualifying round, and 2 losers of the Champions League first qualifying round that received a bye.
- Play-off round (10 teams): 4 winners of the third qualifying round, and 6 losers of the Europa League Champions Path third qualifying round.

Below were the participating teams of the Champions Path (with their 2025 UEFA club coefficients, not used as seeding for the Champions Path, however), grouped by their starting rounds.

Key to colours
Winners of play-off round advanced to league phase

Play-off round
Team	Coeff.
(Latvia) RFS	11.000
(Kosovo) Drita	9.000
(Iceland) Breiðablik	9.000
(Malta) Hamrun Spartans	6.000
(Armenia) Noah	5.000
(Republic of Ireland) Shelbourne	2.993

Third qualifying round
Team	Coeff.
(Faroe Islands) Víkingur Gøta	4.000
(San Marino) Virtus	1.500

Second qualifying round
Team	Coeff.
(Slovenia) Olimpija Ljubljana	17.375
(Lithuania) Žalgiris	12.000
(Wales) The New Saints	9.000
(Northern Ireland) Linfield	8.500
(Montenegro) Budućnost Podgorica	8.000
(Andorra) Inter Club d'Escaldes	7.500
(Estonia) FCI Levadia	6.500
(Belarus) Dinamo Minsk	6.000
(Moldova) Milsami Orhei	5.500
(Luxembourg) Differdange 03	5.000
(Georgia (country)) Iberia 1999	4.500
(Albania) Egnatia	2.500

Notes

1. ^{UEL CH Q3} Losers of Europa League third qualifying round (Champions Path).
2. ^{UCL Q1} Losers of Champions League first qualifying round.

=== Main Path ===
The Main Path included league non-champions and domestic cup winners and consisted of the following rounds:

- First qualifying round (48 teams): 48 teams which entered in this round.
- Second qualifying round (88 teams): 56 teams which entered in this round, 8 losers of the Europa League Main Path first qualifying round, and 24 winners of the first qualifying round.
- Third qualifying round (52 teams): 8 losers of the Europa League Main Path second qualifying round, 44 winners of the second qualifying round and one winner of the first qualifying round.
- Play-off round (38 teams): 5 teams which entered this round, 7 losers of the Europa League Main Path third qualifying round, and 26 winners of the third qualifying round.

Below were the participating teams of the League Path (with their 2025 UEFA club coefficients), grouped by their starting rounds.

Key to colours
Winners of play-off round advanced to league phase

Play-off round
Team	Coeff.
(Italy) Fiorentina	62.000
(Ukraine) Shakhtar Donetsk	52.000
(Poland) Legia Warsaw	31.000
(England) Crystal Palace	23.039
(Romania) CFR Cluj	19.000
(Spain) Rayo Vallecano	18.890
(Germany) Mainz 05	17.266
(France) Strasbourg	14.618
(Switzerland) Servette	11.500
(Austria) Wolfsberger AC	9.500
(Norway) Fredrikstad	7.937
(Sweden) BK Häcken	7.000

Third qualifying round
Team	Coeff.
(Belgium) Anderlecht	28.250
(Moldova) Sheriff Tiraspol	20.000
(Switzerland) Lugano	19.250
(Turkey) Beşiktaş	15.000
(Slovenia) Celje	14.000
(Czech Republic) Baník Ostrava	8.820
(Scotland) Hibernian	7.110
(Bulgaria) Levski Sofia	4.500

Second qualifying round
Team	Coeff.
(Netherlands) AZ	54.500
(Austria) Rapid Wien	32.250
(Czech Republic) Sparta Prague	29.500
(Turkey) İstanbul Başakşehir	23.000
(Serbia) Partizan	22.000
(Israel) Maccabi Haifa	18.000
(Republic of Ireland) Shamrock Rovers	17.875
(Cyprus) Omonia	17.375
(Israel) Hapoel Be'er Sheva	16.500
(Poland) Jagiellonia Białystok	14.000
(Portugal) Santa Clara	12.453
(Kazakhstan) Astana	12.000
(Belgium) Charleroi	11.370
(Croatia) Hajduk Split	10.000
(Latvia) Riga	10.000
(Slovenia) Maribor	9.500
(Greece) AEK Athens	9.500
(Slovakia) Spartak Trnava	8.500
(Kosovo) Ballkani	8.000
(Poland) Raków Częstochowa	8.000
(Norway) Rosenborg	7.937
(Norway) Viking	7.937
(Greece) Aris	7.862
Ararat-Armenia	7.500
Austria Wien	7.500
(Liechtenstein) Vaduz	7.500
(Scotland) Dundee United	7.110
(Denmark) Brøndby	7.000
(Denmark) Silkeborg	6.796
(Switzerland) Lausanne-Sport	6.725
(Hungary) Puskás Akadémia	6.500
(Romania) Universitatea Craiova	6.500
(Israel) Beitar Jerusalem	6.325
(Faroe Islands) HB	6.000
(Bosnia and Herzegovina) Sarajevo	6.000
(Cyprus) Aris Limassol	5.507
(Sweden) Hammarby IF	5.500
(Malta) Hibernians	5.500
(Sweden) AIK	5.425
(Croatia) Varaždin	5.405
(Serbia) Radnički 1923	5.100
(Serbia) Novi Pazar	5.100
(Slovakia) Žilina	5.000
(Ukraine) Polissya Zhytomyr	4.880
(Ukraine) Oleksandriya	4.880
(Hungary) Paks	4.800
(Hungary) Győri ETO	4.800
(Romania) Universitatea Cluj	4.650
(Slovakia) Košice	4.250
(Azerbaijan) Zira	4.000
(Azerbaijan) Sabah	4.000
(Bulgaria) Cherno More	3.975
(Bulgaria) Arda	3.975
(Azerbaijan) Araz-Naxçıvan	3.925
(Finland) Ilves	3.000
(Moldova) Zimbru Chișinău	3.000
(Kazakhstan) Aktobe	3.000
(Iceland) KA	2.704
(Kosovo) Prishtina	2.500
(Northern Ireland) Dungannon Swifts	1.666
(Lithuania) Banga	1.650
(Albania) Dinamo City	1.575
(Luxembourg) UNA Strassen	1.375
(Georgia (country)) Spaeri	1.325

First qualifying round
Team	Coeff.
(Bosnia and Herzegovina) Borac Banja Luka	13.625
(Finland) HJK	12.500
(Estonia) Flora	11.500
(Faroe Islands) KÍ	11.000
(Iceland) Víkingur Reykjavík	10.750
(Armenia) Pyunik	8.500
(Moldova) Petrocub Hîncești	8.500
(Northern Ireland) Larne	7.000
(Estonia) Paide Linnameeskond	7.000
(Luxembourg) F91 Dudelange	7.000
(Albania) Partizani	6.500
(Republic of Ireland) St Patrick's Athletic	5.500
(San Marino) La Fiorita	5.500
(Montenegro) Sutjeska	5.500
(Albania) Vllaznia	5.000
(Lithuania) Kauno Žalgiris	5.000
(Kazakhstan) Ordabasy	4.500
(Malta) Floriana	4.500
(Slovenia) Koper	4.068
(Armenia) Urartu	4.000
(Belarus) Torpedo-BelAZ Zhodino	4.000
(Gibraltar) St Joseph's	4.000
(Georgia (country)) Dila Gori	4.000
(Montenegro) Dečić	4.000
(Andorra) FC Santa Coloma	4.000
(Belarus) Dynamo Brest	4.000
(Latvia) Auda	3.500
(Belarus) Neman Grodno	3.500
(Gibraltar) Magpies	3.500
(Andorra) Atlètic Club d'Escaldes	3.500
(Georgia (country)) Torpedo Kutaisi	3.000
(Iceland) Valur	3.000
(San Marino) Tre Fiori	3.000
(Bosnia and Herzegovina) Željezničar	2.606
(Northern Ireland) Cliftonville	2.500
(Malta) Birkirkara	2.500
(Luxembourg) Racing Union	2.500
(North Macedonia) Sileks	2.500
(Latvia) Daugavpils	2.450
(Kosovo) Malisheva	2.408
(Finland) SJK	2.350
(Faroe Islands) NSÍ	2.150
(Lithuania) Hegelmann	1.650
(Estonia) Nõmme Kalju	1.591
(Wales) Haverfordwest County	1.500
(Wales) Penybont	1.358
(North Macedonia) Vardar	1.233
(North Macedonia) Rabotnicki	1.233

Notes

1. ^{UEL MP Q3} Losers of Europa League third qualifying round (Main Path).
2. ^{UEL MP Q2} Losers of Europa League second qualifying round (Main Path).
3. ^{UEL MP Q1} Losers of Europa League first qualifying round (Main Path).
4. ^{†} Slovak club DAC Dunajská Streda (8.000) originally entered the competition and took part in the second qualifying round draw, but were later replaced by Košice.

== First qualifying round ==
The draw for the first qualifying round was held on 17 June 2025.

=== Seeding ===
A total of 48 teams played in the first qualifying round. Seeding of the teams was based on their 2025 UEFA club coefficients. Before the draw, UEFA allocated the teams into six groups of four seeded teams and four unseeded teams in accordance with the principles set by the Club Competitions Committee. Teams were pre-assigned numbers by UEFA so that the draw could be held in one run for all groups. The first team drawn in each tie was designated the home team for the first leg.

Group 1		Group 2		Group 3	
Seeded	Unseeded	Seeded	Unseeded	Seeded	Unseeded
(Finland) HJK (2); (Estonia) Paide Linnameeskond (1); (Republic of Ireland) St Patrick's Athletic (3); (Albania) Vllaznia (4)	(Gibraltar) Magpies (6); (Latvia) Daugavpils (5); (Faroe Islands) NSÍ (7); (Lithuania) Hegelmann (8)	(Moldova) Petrocub Hîncești (1); (Kazakhstan) Ordabasy (2); (Armenia) Urartu (4); (Montenegro) Dečić (3)	(Belarus) Neman Grodno (5); (Georgia (country)) Torpedo Kutaisi (7); (Malta) Birkirkara (6); (North Macedonia) Sileks (8)	(Luxembourg) F91 Dudelange (1); (Slovenia) Koper (2); (Montenegro) Sutjeska (3); (San Marino) La Fiorita (4)	(Belarus) Dynamo Brest (8); (Andorra) Atlètic Club d'Escaldes (6); (Bosnia and Herzegovina) Željezničar (7); (North Macedonia) Vardar (5)
Group 4		Group 5		Group 6	
Seeded	Unseeded	Seeded	Unseeded	Seeded	Unseeded
(Estonia) Flora (1); (Faroe Islands) KÍ (2); (Northern Ireland) Larne (3); (Lithuania) Kauno Žalgiris (4)	(Latvia) Auda (8); (Iceland) Valur (6); (Finland) SJK (7); (Wales) Penybont (5)	(Iceland) Víkingur Reykjavík (1); (Albania) Partizani (2); (Malta) Floriana (3); (Gibraltar) St Joseph's (4)	(Northern Ireland) Cliftonville (5); (Kosovo) Malisheva (6); (Estonia) Nõmme Kalju (7); (Wales) Haverfordwest County (8)	(Bosnia and Herzegovina) Borac Banja Luka (4); (Armenia) Pyunik (2); (Belarus) Torpedo-BelAZ Zhodino (3); (Georgia (country)) Dila Gori (1)	(Andorra) FC Santa Coloma (5); (San Marino) Tre Fiori (7); (Luxembourg) Racing Union (6); (North Macedonia) Rabotnicki (8)

=== Summary ===
The first legs were played on 8 and 10 July, and the second legs were played on 16 and 17 July 2025.

The winners of the ties advanced to the second qualifying round.

First qualifying round
Team 1	Agg.	Team 2	1st leg	2nd leg
NSÍ (Faroe Islands)	4–5	(Finland) HJK	4–0	0–5 (a.e.t.)
Torpedo Kutaisi (Georgia (country))	5–4	(Kazakhstan) Ordabasy	4–3	1–1
Željezničar (Bosnia and Herzegovina)	2–4	(Slovenia) Koper	1–1	1–3
SJK (Finland)	1–4	(Faroe Islands) KÍ	1–2	0–2
Nõmme Kalju (Estonia)	2–1	(Albania) Partizani	1–1	1–0 (a.e.t.)
Tre Fiori (San Marino)	1–5	(Armenia) Pyunik	1–0	0–5
St Patrick's Athletic (Republic of Ireland)	3–0	(Lithuania) Hegelmann	1–0	2–0
Dečić (Montenegro)	3–2	(North Macedonia) Sileks	2–0	1–2
Sutjeska (Montenegro)	3–2	(Belarus) Dynamo Brest	1–2	2–0
Larne (Northern Ireland)	2–2 (4–2 p)	(Latvia) Auda	0–0	2–2 (a.e.t.)
Floriana (Malta)	5–3	(Wales) Haverfordwest County	2–1	3–2
Torpedo-BelAZ Zhodino (Belarus)	4–0	(North Macedonia) Rabotnicki	3–0	1–0
Magpies (Gibraltar)	3–7	(Estonia) Paide Linnameeskond	2–3	1–4
Birkirkara (Malta)	1–3	(Moldova) Petrocub Hîncești	1–0	0–3
Atlètic Club d'Escaldes (Andorra)	5–2	(Luxembourg) F91 Dudelange	2–0	3–2
Valur (Iceland)	5–1	(Estonia) Flora	3–0	2–1
Malisheva (Kosovo)	0–9	(Iceland) Víkingur Reykjavík	0–1	0–8
Racing Union (Luxembourg)	1–3	(Georgia (country)) Dila Gori	1–2	0–1
Vllaznia (Albania)	4–3	(Latvia) Daugavpils	0–1	4–2
Urartu (Armenia)	1–6	(Belarus) Neman Grodno	1–2	0–4
Vardar (North Macedonia)	5–2 (Note: Order of legs reversed after original draw.)	(San Marino) La Fiorita	3–0	2–2
Kauno Žalgiris (Lithuania)	4–1	(Wales) Penybont	3–0	1–1
St Joseph's (Gibraltar)	5–4	(Northern Ireland) Cliftonville	2–2	3–2 (a.e.t.)
Borac Banja Luka (Bosnia and Herzegovina)	3–4	(Andorra) FC Santa Coloma	1–4	2–0

== Second qualifying round ==
The draw for the second qualifying round was held on 18 June 2025.

=== Seeding ===
A total of 100 teams played in the second qualifying round. Seeding of the teams was based on their 2025 UEFA club coefficients. Before the draw, UEFA formed groups of seeded and unseeded teams per the principles set by the Club Competitions Committee. The first team drawn in each tie was the home team for the first leg.

Champions Path
Group 1		Group 2	
Seeded	Unseeded	Seeded	Unseeded
(Wales) The New Saints; (Estonia) FCI Levadia; (Lithuania) Žalgiris	(Luxembourg) Differdange 03; (Georgia (country)) Iberia 1999; (Northern Ireland) Linfield	(Andorra) Inter Club d'Escaldes; (Belarus) Dinamo Minsk; (Moldova) Milsami Orhei	(Slovenia) Olimpija Ljubljana; (Montenegro) Budućnost Podgorica; (Albania) Egnatia

Main Path
Group 1		Group 2		Group 3	
Seeded	Unseeded	Seeded	Unseeded	Seeded	Unseeded
(Republic of Ireland) Shamrock Rovers; (Portugal) Santa Clara; (Kosovo) Ballkani; (Scotland) Dundee United; (Switzerland) Lausanne-Sport	(North Macedonia) Vardar; (Croatia) Varaždin; (Malta) Floriana; (Gibraltar) St Joseph's; (Luxembourg) UNA Strassen	(Netherlands) AZ; (Iceland) Valur; (Norway) Viking; (Northern Ireland) Larne; (Denmark) Brøndby	(Faroe Islands) HB; (Lithuania) Kauno Žalgiris; (Slovenia) Koper; (Finland) Ilves; (Kosovo) Prishtina	(Croatia) Hajduk Split; (Slovenia) Maribor; (Greece) AEK Athens; (Slovakia) ~~DAC Dunajská Streda~~; (Serbia) Partizan	(Ukraine) Oleksandriya; (Hungary) Paks; (Israel) Hapoel Be'er Sheva; (Azerbaijan) Zira; (Belarus) Neman Grodno
Group 4		Group 5		Group 6	
Seeded	Unseeded	Seeded	Unseeded	Seeded	Unseeded
(Finland) HJK; (Iceland) Víkingur Reykjavík; (Armenia) Pyunik; (Liechtenstein) Vaduz; (Slovakia) Spartak Trnava	(Malta) Hibernians; (Albania) Vllaznia; (Hungary) Győri ETO; (Bulgaria) Arda; (Northern Ireland) Dungannon Swifts	(Czech Republic) Sparta Prague; (Belgium) Charleroi; (Latvia) Riga; (Denmark) Silkeborg; (Estonia) Nõmme Kalju	(Republic of Ireland) St Patrick's Athletic; (Sweden) Hammarby IF; (Georgia (country)) Dila Gori; (Kazakhstan) Aktobe; (Iceland) KA	(Kazakhstan) Astana; (Faroe Islands) KÍ; (Poland) Raków Częstochowa; (Norway) Rosenborg; (Estonia) Paide Linnameeskond	(Sweden) AIK; (Serbia) Radnički 1923; (Slovakia) Žilina; (Moldova) Zimbru Chișinău; (Lithuania) Banga
Group 7		Group 8		Group 9	
Seeded	Unseeded	Seeded	Unseeded	Seeded	Unseeded
(Austria) Rapid Wien; (Poland) Jagiellonia Białystok; (Moldova) Petrocub Hîncești; (Andorra) Atlètic Club d'Escaldes; (Romania) Universitatea Craiova	(Bosnia and Herzegovina) Sarajevo; (Serbia) Novi Pazar; (Azerbaijan) Sabah; (Montenegro) Dečić; (Albania) Dinamo City	(Israel) Maccabi Haifa; (Andorra) FC Santa Coloma; Ararat-Armenia; Austria Wien; (Hungary) Puskás Akadémia	(Cyprus) Aris Limassol; (Ukraine) Polissya Zhytomyr; (Romania) Universitatea Cluj; (Belarus) Torpedo-BelAZ Zhodino; (Georgia (country)) Spaeri	(Turkey) İstanbul Başakşehir; (Cyprus) Omonia; (Greece) Aris; (Israel) Beitar Jerusalem	(Montenegro) Sutjeska; (Georgia (country)) Torpedo Kutaisi; (Bulgaria) Cherno More; (Azerbaijan) Araz-Naxçıvan

Notes

1. ^{†} Losers of the Champions League first qualifying round, whose identity was not known at the time of draw. Teams in italics lost to a team with a lower coefficient, thus effectively taking the coefficient of their opponent in the draw.
2. ^{††} Winners of the first qualifying round, whose identity was not known at the time of draw. Teams in italics defeated a team with a higher coefficient, thus effectively taking the coefficient of their opponent in the draw.
3. ^{†††} Losers of the Europa League first qualifying round, whose identity was not known at the time of draw. Teams in italics lost to a team with a lower coefficient, thus effectively taking the coefficient of their opponent in the draw.
4. ^{&} DAC Dunajská Streda took part in the draw, but were later replaced by Košice.

=== Summary ===
The first legs were played on 22, 23 and 24 July, and the second legs were played on 29 and 31 July 2025.

The winners of the ties advanced to the third qualifying round.

Second qualifying round
Team 1	Agg.	Team 2	1st leg	2nd leg
Champions Path
Víkingur Gøta (Faroe Islands)	Bye	N/A	—	—
Virtus (San Marino)	Bye	N/A	—	—
FCI Levadia (Estonia)	3–2	(Georgia (country)) Iberia 1999	1–0	2–2 (a.e.t.)
Žalgiris (Lithuania)	0–2	(Northern Ireland) Linfield	0–0	0–2
The New Saints (Wales)	0–2	(Luxembourg) Differdange 03	0–1	0–1
Olimpija Ljubljana (Slovenia)	5–3	(Andorra) Inter Club d'Escaldes	4–2	1–1
Budućnost Podgorica (Montenegro)	1–2	(Moldova) Milsami Orhei	0–0	1–2
Dinamo Minsk (Belarus)	0–3	(Albania) Egnatia	0–2	0–1
Main Path
Dundee United (Scotland)	2–0	(Luxembourg) UNA Strassen	1–0	1–0
Larne (Northern Ireland)	1–1 (5–4 p)	(Kosovo) Prishtina	0–0	1–1 (a.e.t.)
Košice (Slovakia)	3–4	(Belarus) Neman Grodno	2–3	1–1
Vaduz (Liechtenstein)	3–1	(Northern Ireland) Dungannon Swifts	0–1	3–0 (a.e.t.)
Silkeborg (Denmark)	4–3	(Iceland) KA	1–1	3–2 (a.e.t.)
Rosenborg (Norway)	7–0	(Lithuania) Banga	5–0	2–0
Atlètic Club d'Escaldes (Andorra)	2–3	(Albania) Dinamo City	1–2	1–1
Austria Wien	7–0	(Georgia (country)) Spaeri	2–0	5–0
Ballkani (Kosovo)	5–3	(Malta) Floriana	4–2	1–1
Viking (Norway)	12–3	(Slovenia) Koper	7–0	5–3
AEK Athens (Greece)	1–0	(Israel) Hapoel Be'er Sheva	1–0	0–0
Pyunik (Armenia)	3–4	(Hungary) Győri ETO	2–1	1–3
Riga (Latvia)	5–4	(Georgia (country)) Dila Gori	2–1	3–3
Raków Częstochowa (Poland)	6–1	(Slovakia) Žilina	3–0	3–1
Petrocub Hîncești (Moldova)	1–6	(Azerbaijan) Sabah	0–2	1–4
Ararat-Armenia	2–1	(Romania) Universitatea Cluj	0–0	2–1 (a.e.t.)
Varaždin (Croatia)	2–3	(Portugal) Santa Clara	2–1	0–2
Kauno Žalgiris (Lithuania)	3–2	(Iceland) Valur	1–1	2–1
Paks (Hungary)	2–1	(Slovenia) Maribor	1–0	1–1
Vllaznia (Albania)	4–5	(Iceland) Víkingur Reykjavík	2–1	2–4 (a.e.t.)
Hammarby IF (Sweden)	2–1	(Belgium) Charleroi	0–0	2–1 (a.e.t.)
Radnički 1923 (Serbia)	0–1	(Faroe Islands) KÍ	0–0	0–1
Novi Pazar (Serbia)	2–5	(Poland) Jagiellonia Białystok	1–2	1–3
Polissya Zhytomyr (Ukraine)	5–3	(Andorra) FC Santa Coloma	1–2	4–1
Vardar (North Macedonia)	2–6	(Switzerland) Lausanne-Sport	2–1	0–5
HB (Faroe Islands)	1–2	(Denmark) Brøndby	1–1	0–1
Oleksandriya (Ukraine)	0–6	(Serbia) Partizan	0–2	0–4
Hibernians (Malta)	2–7	(Slovakia) Spartak Trnava	1–2	1–5
St Patrick's Athletic (Republic of Ireland)	3–2	(Estonia) Nõmme Kalju	1–0	2–2 (a.e.t.)
Paide Linnameeskond (Estonia)	0–8 (Note: Order of legs reversed after original draw.)	(Sweden) AIK	0–2	0–6
Sarajevo (Bosnia and Herzegovina)	2–5	(Romania) Universitatea Craiova	2–1	0–4
Aris Limassol (Cyprus)	5–2	(Hungary) Puskás Akadémia	3–2	2–0
St Joseph's (Gibraltar)	0–4	(Republic of Ireland) Shamrock Rovers	0–4	0–0
Ilves (Finland)	4–8	(Netherlands) AZ	4–3	0–5
Zira (Azerbaijan)	2–3	(Croatia) Hajduk Split	1–1	1–2 (a.e.t.)
Arda (Bulgaria)	2–2 (4–3 p)	(Finland) HJK	0–0	2–2 (a.e.t.)
Aktobe (Kazakhstan)	2–5	(Czech Republic) Sparta Prague	2–1	0–4
Astana (Kazakhstan)	3–1	(Moldova) Zimbru Chișinău	1–1	2–0
Dečić (Montenegro)	2–6	(Austria) Rapid Wien	0–2	2–4
Torpedo-BelAZ Zhodino (Belarus)	1–4	(Israel) Maccabi Haifa	1–1	0–3
Araz-Naxçıvan (Azerbaijan)	4–3	(Greece) Aris	2–1	2–2
Omonia (Cyprus)	5–0	(Georgia (country)) Torpedo Kutaisi	1–0	4–0
Cherno More (Bulgaria)	0–5	(Turkey) İstanbul Başakşehir	0–1	0–4
Sutjeska (Montenegro)	3–7	(Israel) Beitar Jerusalem	1–2	2–5

== Third qualifying round ==
The draw for the third qualifying round was held on 21 July 2025.

=== Seeding ===
A total of 60 teams played in the third qualifying round. Seeding of the teams was based on their 2025 UEFA club coefficients. Before the draw, UEFA formed groups of seeded and unseeded teams per the principles set by the Club Competitions Committee. The first team drawn in each tie was the home team for the first leg.

Champions Path
Group 1		Group 2	
Seeded	Unseeded	Seeded	Unseeded
(Slovenia) Olimpija Ljubljana; (Moldova) Milsami Orhei	(Albania) Egnatia; (San Marino) Virtus	(Northern Ireland) Linfield; (Luxembourg) Differdange 03	(Estonia) FCI Levadia; (Faroe Islands) Víkingur Gøta

Main Path
Group 1		Group 2		Group 3	
Seeded	Unseeded	Seeded	Unseeded	Seeded	Unseeded
(Austria) Rapid Wien; (Turkey) İstanbul Başakşehir; (Moldova) Sheriff Tiraspol; (Faroe Islands) KÍ; (Hungary) Győri ETO	(Norway) Viking; (Scotland) Dundee United; (Belgium) Anderlecht; (Sweden) AIK; (Belarus) Neman Grodno	(Czech Republic) Sparta Prague; (Cyprus) Omonia; (Kazakhstan) Astana; (Latvia) Riga; (Slovakia) Spartak Trnava	(Azerbaijan) Araz-Naxçıvan; Ararat-Armenia; (Switzerland) Lausanne-Sport; (Romania) Universitatea Craiova; (Israel) Beitar Jerusalem	(Netherlands) AZ; (Republic of Ireland) Shamrock Rovers; (Portugal) Santa Clara; (Iceland) Víkingur Reykjavík; (Hungary) Paks	(Kosovo) Ballkani; (Liechtenstein) Vaduz; (Northern Ireland) Larne; (Ukraine) Polissya Zhytomyr; (Denmark) Brøndby
Group 4		Group 5			
Seeded	Unseeded	Seeded	Unseeded		
(Switzerland) Lugano; (Israel) Maccabi Haifa; (Greece) AEK Athens; (Croatia) Hajduk Split; (Azerbaijan) Sabah	(Poland) Raków Częstochowa; (Slovenia) Celje; (Cyprus) Aris Limassol; (Bulgaria) Levski Sofia; (Albania) Dinamo City	(Serbia) Partizan; (Turkey) Beşiktaş; (Poland) Jagiellonia Białystok; (Bulgaria) Arda; (Sweden) Hammarby IF; (Czech Republic) Baník Ostrava	(Norway) Rosenborg; Austria Wien; (Scotland) Hibernian; (Denmark) Silkeborg; (Republic of Ireland) St Patrick's Athletic; (Lithuania) Kauno Žalgiris		

Notes

1. ^{†} Winners of the second qualifying round, whose identity was not known at the time of draw. Teams in italics defeated a team with a higher coefficient, thus effectively taking the coefficient of their opponent in the draw.
2. ^{††} Losers of the Europa League second qualifying round, whose identity was not known at the time of draw. Teams in italics lost to a team with a lower coefficient, thus effectively taking the coefficient of their opponent in the draw.

=== Summary ===
The first legs were played on 5 and 7 August, and the second legs were played on 13 and 14 August 2025.

Third qualifying round
Team 1	Agg.	Team 2	1st leg	2nd leg
Champions Path
Olimpija Ljubljana (Slovenia)	4–2	(Albania) Egnatia	0–0	4–2 (a.e.t.)
Milsami Orhei (Moldova)	3–5	(San Marino) Virtus	3–2	0–3
Differdange 03 (Luxembourg)	5–4	(Estonia) FCI Levadia	2–3	3–1 (a.e.t.)
Víkingur Gøta (Faroe Islands)	2–3	(Northern Ireland) Linfield	2–1	0–2
Main Path
Rapid Wien (Austria)	4–4 (5–4 p)	(Scotland) Dundee United	2–2	2–2 (a.e.t.)
Sparta Prague (Czech Republic)	6–2	Ararat-Armenia	4–1	2–1
AZ (Netherlands)	4–0	(Liechtenstein) Vaduz	3–0	1–0
Lugano (Switzerland)	4–7	(Slovenia) Celje	0–5	4–2
KÍ (Faroe Islands)	2–2 (4–5 p)	(Belarus) Neman Grodno	2–0	0–2 (a.e.t.)
Riga (Latvia)	4–3	(Israel) Beitar Jerusalem	3–0	1–3
Víkingur Reykjavík (Iceland)	3–4	(Denmark) Brøndby	3–0	0–4
Hajduk Split (Croatia)	3–4	(Albania) Dinamo City	2–1	1–3 (a.e.t.)
Anderlecht (Belgium)	4–1	(Moldova) Sheriff Tiraspol	3–0	1–1
Lausanne-Sport (Switzerland)	5–1	(Kazakhstan) Astana	3–1	2–0
Larne (Northern Ireland)	0–3	(Portugal) Santa Clara	0–3	0–0
Aris Limassol (Cyprus)	3–5	(Greece) AEK Athens	2–2	1–3 (a.e.t.)
Viking (Norway)	2–4	(Turkey) İstanbul Başakşehir	1–3	1–1
Araz-Naxçıvan (Azerbaijan)	0–9	(Cyprus) Omonia	0–4	0–5
Ballkani (Kosovo)	1–4	(Republic of Ireland) Shamrock Rovers	1–0	0–4
Raków Częstochowa (Poland)	2–1	(Israel) Maccabi Haifa	0–1	2–0
AIK (Sweden)	2–3	(Hungary) Győri ETO	2–1	0–2
Universitatea Craiova (Romania)	6–4	(Slovakia) Spartak Trnava	3–0	3–4 (a.e.t.)
Polissya Zhytomyr (Ukraine)	4–2	(Hungary) Paks	3–0	1–2
Levski Sofia (Bulgaria)	3–0	(Azerbaijan) Sabah	1–0	2–0
Silkeborg (Denmark)	2–3	(Poland) Jagiellonia Białystok	0–1	2–2
Partizan (Serbia)	3–4	(Scotland) Hibernian	0–2	3–2 (a.e.t.)
Baník Ostrava (Czech Republic)	5–4	Austria Wien	4–3	1–1
Rosenborg (Norway)	1–0	(Sweden) Hammarby IF	0–0	1–0
St Patrick's Athletic (Republic of Ireland)	3–7	(Turkey) Beşiktaş	1–4	2–3
Kauno Žalgiris (Lithuania)	0–3	(Bulgaria) Arda	0–1	0–2

== Play-off round ==
The draw for the play-off round was held on 4 August 2025.

=== Seeding ===
A total of 48 teams played in the play-off round. Seeding of the teams was based on their 2025 UEFA club coefficients. Before the draw, UEFA formed groups of seeded and unseeded teams per the principles set by the Club Competitions Committee. The first team drawn in each tie was the home team for the first leg.

Champions Path
Seeded	Unseeded
(Slovenia) Olimpija Ljubljana; (Latvia) RFS; (Kosovo) Drita; (Iceland) Breiðablik; (Northern Ireland) Linfield	(Luxembourg) Differdange 03; (Malta) Hamrun Spartans; (San Marino) Virtus; (Armenia) Noah; (Republic of Ireland) Shelbourne

Main Path
Group 1		Group 2	
Seeded	Unseeded	Seeded	Unseeded
(Netherlands) AZ; (Belgium) Anderlecht; (Slovenia) Celje; (Spain) Rayo Vallecano; (France) Strasbourg	(Belarus) Neman Grodno; (Denmark) Brøndby; (Greece) AEK Athens; (Czech Republic) Baník Ostrava; (Bulgaria) Levski Sofia	(Italy) Fiorentina; (Turkey) İstanbul Başakşehir; (Poland) Raków Częstochowa; (Turkey) Beşiktaş; (Poland) Jagiellonia Białystok	(Switzerland) Lausanne-Sport; (Albania) Dinamo City; (Romania) Universitatea Craiova; (Bulgaria) Arda; (Ukraine) Polissya Zhytomyr
Group 3		Group 4	
Seeded	Unseeded	Seeded	Unseeded
(Austria) Rapid Wien; (England) Crystal Palace; (Scotland) Hibernian; (Republic of Ireland) Shamrock Rovers; (Ukraine) Shakhtar Donetsk	(Portugal) Santa Clara; (Switzerland) Servette; (Norway) Fredrikstad; (Poland) Legia Warsaw; (Hungary) Győri ETO	(Czech Republic) Sparta Prague; (Romania) CFR Cluj; (Cyprus) Omonia; (Germany) Mainz 05	(Latvia) Riga; (Austria) Wolfsberger AC; (Norway) Rosenborg; (Sweden) BK Häcken

Notes

1. ^{†} Losers of the Europa League third qualifying round, whose identity was not known at the time of draw. Teams in italics lost to a team with a lower coefficient, thus effectively taking the coefficient of their opponent in the draw.
2. ^{††} Winners of the third qualifying round, whose identity was not known at the time of draw. Teams in italics defeated a team with a higher coefficient, thus effectively taking the coefficient of their opponent in the draw.

=== Summary ===
The first legs were played on 21 August, and the second legs were played on 27 and 28 August 2025.

Play-off round
Team 1	Agg.	Team 2	1st leg	2nd leg
Champions Path
Hamrun Spartans (Malta)	3–2	(Latvia) RFS	1–0	2–2
Shelbourne (Republic of Ireland)	5–1	(Northern Ireland) Linfield	3–1	2–0
Breiðablik (Iceland)	5–2	(San Marino) Virtus	2–1	3–1
Drita (Kosovo)	3–1	(Luxembourg) Differdange 03	2–1	1–0
Olimpija Ljubljana (Slovenia)	3–7	(Armenia) Noah	1–4	2–3
Main Path
Strasbourg (France)	3–2	(Denmark) Brøndby	0–0	3–2
Jagiellonia Białystok (Poland)	4–1	(Albania) Dinamo City	3–0	1–1
Shakhtar Donetsk (Ukraine)	3–2	(Switzerland) Servette	1–1	2–1 (a.e.t.)
Anderlecht (Belgium)	1–3	(Greece) AEK Athens	1–1	0–2
İstanbul Başakşehir (Turkey)	2–5	(Romania) Universitatea Craiova	1–2	1–3
Crystal Palace (England)	1–0	(Norway) Fredrikstad	1–0	0–0
Celje (Slovenia)	3–0	(Czech Republic) Baník Ostrava	1–0	2–0
Raków Częstochowa (Poland)	3–1	(Bulgaria) Arda	1–0	2–1
Hibernian (Scotland)	4–5	(Poland) Legia Warsaw	1–2	3–3 (a.e.t.)
Levski Sofia (Bulgaria)	1–6	(Netherlands) AZ	0–2	1–4
Polissya Zhytomyr (Ukraine)	2–6	(Italy) Fiorentina	0–3	2–3
Győri ETO (Hungary)	2–3	(Austria) Rapid Wien	2–1	0–2
Neman Grodno (Belarus)	0–5	(Spain) Rayo Vallecano	0–1	0–4
Lausanne-Sport (Switzerland)	2–1	(Turkey) Beşiktaş	1–1	1–0
Santa Clara (Portugal)	1–2	(Republic of Ireland) Shamrock Rovers	1–2	0–0
Rosenborg (Norway)	3–5	(Germany) Mainz 05	2–1	1–4
Sparta Prague (Czech Republic)	2–1	(Latvia) Riga	2–0	0–1
BK Häcken (Sweden)	7–3	(Romania) CFR Cluj	7–2	0–1
Wolfsberger AC (Austria)	2–2 (4–5 p)	(Cyprus) Omonia	2–1	0–1 (a.e.t.)
