= Maksim Kravtsov =

Belarusian footballer

Personal information
- Date of birth: 20 June 2002 (age 24)
- Place of birth: Grodno, Belarus
- Position: Forward

Team information
- Current team: Neman Grodno
- Number: 18

Youth career
- 2016–2021: Neman Grodno

Senior career*
Years	Team	Apps	(Gls)
2021–	Neman Grodno	69	(11)
2022	→ Smorgon (loan)	23	(0)

International career^{‡}
2023	Belarus U21	2	(0)
- * Club domestic league appearances and goals as of 3 July 2026 ‡ National team caps and goals as of 20 November 2023

Maksim Kravtsov (Belarusian: Максім Краўцоў; Russian: Максим Кравцов; born 20 June 2002) is a Belarusian professional footballer who plays for Neman Grodno.
