= 2025–26 UEFA Conference League qualifying (first and second round matches) =

European football competition

This page summarises the matches of the first and second qualifying rounds of 2025–26 UEFA Conference League qualifying.

Times are CEST (UTC+2), as listed by UEFA (local times, if different, are in parentheses).

== First qualifying round ==
=== Summary ===
The first legs were played on 8 and 10 July, and the second legs were played on 16 and 17 July 2025.

The winners of the ties advanced to the second qualifying round.

First qualifying round
Team 1	Agg.	Team 2	1st leg	2nd leg
NSÍ (Faroe Islands)	4–5	(Finland) HJK	4–0	0–5 (a.e.t.)
Torpedo Kutaisi (Georgia (country))	5–4	(Kazakhstan) Ordabasy	4–3	1–1
Željezničar (Bosnia and Herzegovina)	2–4	(Slovenia) Koper	1–1	1–3
SJK (Finland)	1–4	(Faroe Islands) KÍ	1–2	0–2
Nõmme Kalju (Estonia)	2–1	(Albania) Partizani	1–1	1–0 (a.e.t.)
Tre Fiori (San Marino)	1–5	(Armenia) Pyunik	1–0	0–5
St Patrick's Athletic (Republic of Ireland)	3–0	(Lithuania) Hegelmann	1–0	2–0
Dečić (Montenegro)	3–2	(North Macedonia) Sileks	2–0	1–2
Sutjeska (Montenegro)	3–2	(Belarus) Dynamo Brest	1–2	2–0
Larne (Northern Ireland)	2–2 (4–2 p)	(Latvia) Auda	0–0	2–2 (a.e.t.)
Floriana (Malta)	5–3	(Wales) Haverfordwest County	2–1	3–2
Torpedo-BelAZ Zhodino (Belarus)	4–0	(North Macedonia) Rabotnicki	3–0	1–0
Magpies (Gibraltar)	3–7	(Estonia) Paide Linnameeskond	2–3	1–4
Birkirkara (Malta)	1–3	(Moldova) Petrocub Hîncești	1–0	0–3
Atlètic Club d'Escaldes (Andorra)	5–2	(Luxembourg) F91 Dudelange	2–0	3–2
Valur (Iceland)	5–1	(Estonia) Flora	3–0	2–1
Malisheva (Kosovo)	0–9	(Iceland) Víkingur Reykjavík	0–1	0–8
Racing Union (Luxembourg)	1–3	(Georgia (country)) Dila Gori	1–2	0–1
Vllaznia (Albania)	4–3	(Latvia) Daugavpils	0–1	4–2
Urartu (Armenia)	1–6	(Belarus) Neman Grodno	1–2	0–4
Vardar (North Macedonia)	5–2 (Note: Order of legs reversed after original draw.)	(San Marino) La Fiorita	3–0	2–2
Kauno Žalgiris (Lithuania)	4–1	(Wales) Penybont	3–0	1–1
St Joseph's (Gibraltar)	5–4	(Northern Ireland) Cliftonville	2–2	3–2 (a.e.t.)
Borac Banja Luka (Bosnia and Herzegovina)	3–4	(Andorra) FC Santa Coloma	1–4	2–0

=== Matches ===
10 July 2025
20:45 (19:45 UTC+1)

NSÍ (Faroe Islands)	4–0	(Finland) HJK
E. Joensen 12'; Ness 35'; Obbekjær 76'; K. Olsen 83'	Report

Við Djúpumýrar, Klaksvík (Note: NSÍ Runavík played their home match at Við Djúpumýrar in Klaksvík, instead of their regular stadium, Við Løkin, in Runavík, which did not meet UEFA requirements.)
Attendance: 531
Referee: Karl Koppel (Estonia)
17 July 2025
18:00 (19:00 UTC+3)

HJK (Finland)	5–0 (a.e.t.)	(Faroe Islands) NSÍ
Lingman 18'; Ring 53'; Hostikka 79', 93'; Antzoulas 90+4'	Report

Töölö Football Stadium, Helsinki
Attendance: 3,175
Referee: Helgi Mikael Jónasson (Iceland)

HJK won 5–4 on aggregate.

10 July 2025
18:00 (20:00 UTC+4)

Torpedo Kutaisi (Georgia (country))	4–3	(Kazakhstan) Ordabasy
Johnsen 30', 78'; Šimić 45+2', 90+4'	Report	Căpățînă 32'; Imnadze 35'; Tursynbay 69'

Ramaz Shengelia Stadium, Kutaisi
Attendance: 5,672
Referee: Anton Lashuk (Belarus)
17 July 2025
18:00 (21:00 UTC+5)

Ordabasy (Kazakhstan)	1–1	(Georgia (country)) Torpedo Kutaisi
Zhumabek 90+6'	Report	Bidzinashvili 13'

Kazhymukan Munaitpasov Stadium, Shymkent
Attendance: 17,200
Referee: Nikola Popov (Bulgaria)

Torpedo Kutaisi won 5–4 on aggregate.

10 July 2025
20:30

Željezničar (Bosnia and Herzegovina)	1–1	(Slovenia) Koper
Boljević 90+6'	Report	Matondo 7'

Stadion Grbavica, Sarajevo
Attendance: 12,847
Referee: Artem Gasparyan (Armenia)
17 July 2025
19:30

Koper (Slovenia)	3–1	(Bosnia and Herzegovina) Željezničar
Mijailović 44'; Manseri 45+1'; Longonda 45+8'	Report	Krpić 26' (pen.)

Bonifika Stadium, Koper
Attendance: 4,009
Referee: Menelaos Antoniou (Cyprus)

Koper won 4–2 on aggregate.

10 July 2025
18:00 (19:00 UTC+3)

SJK (Finland)	1–2	(Faroe Islands) KÍ
Arsalo 47'	Report	Andreasen 39'; Tellechea 86'

OmaSP Stadion, Seinäjoki
Attendance: 2,781
Referee: Johann Ingi Jonsson (Iceland)
17 July 2025
20:45 (19:45 UTC+1)

KÍ (Faroe Islands)	2–0	(Finland) SJK
Frederiksberg 61'; Klettskarð 73'	Report

Við Djúpumýrar, Klaksvík
Attendance: 1,300
Referee: Wojciech Myc (Poland)

KÍ won 4–1 on aggregate.

10 July 2025
18:45 (19:45 UTC+3)

Nõmme Kalju (Estonia)	1–1	(Albania) Partizani
Männilaan 47'	Report	Skuka 51'

Kadriorg Stadium, Tallinn (Note: Nõmme Kalju played their First Round home match at Kadriorg Stadium, instead of their regular stadium, Hiiu Stadium, which did not meet UEFA requirements.)
Attendance: 1,121
Referee: Ross Hardie (Scotland)
17 July 2025
20:00

Partizani (Albania)	0–1 (a.e.t.)	(Estonia) Nõmme Kalju
	Report	Ivanov 104'

Arena Kombëtare, Tirana (Note: Partizani played their home match at the Arena Kombëtare, instead of their regular stadium, the Arena e Demave, which did not meet UEFA requirements.)
Attendance: 3,669
Referee: Trustin Farrugia Cann (Malta)

Nõmme Kalju won 2–1 on aggregate.

10 July 2025
21:00

Tre Fiori (San Marino)	1–0	(Armenia) Pyunik
Manfroni 63'	Report

San Marino Stadium, Serravalle
Attendance: 305
Referee: Igor Bosca (Moldova)
17 July 2025
18:00 (20:00 UTC+4)

Pyunik (Armenia)	5–0	(San Marino) Tre Fiori
Otubanjo 14' (pen.), 85'; Alemão 24'; Noubissi 40' (pen.); Moretti 89' (o.g.)	Report

Vazgen Sargsyan Republican Stadium, Yerevan
Attendance: 5,650
Referee: Florian Lata (Albania)

Pyunik won 5–1 on aggregate.

10 July 2025
20:45 (19:45 UTC+1)

St Patrick's Athletic (Republic of Ireland)	1–0	(Lithuania) Hegelmann
Keena 79' (pen.)	Report

Richmond Park, Dublin
Attendance: 2,184
Referee: Simon Bourdeaud'hui (Belgium)
17 July 2025
18:00 (19:00 UTC+3)

Hegelmann (Lithuania)	0–2	(Republic of Ireland) St Patrick's Athletic
	Report	Melia 6'; Leavy 56'

Raudondvario stadionas, Raudondvaris
Attendance: 1,550
Referee: Mads Kristoffersen (Denmark)

St Patrick's Athletic won 3–0 on aggregate.

10 July 2025
20:00

Dečić (Montenegro)	2–0	(North Macedonia) Sileks
Bajović 39'; N'Diaye 71'	Report

Stadion Tuško Polje, Tuzi
Attendance: 995
Referee: Zaven Hovhannisyan (Armenia)
17 July 2025
19:00

Sileks (North Macedonia)	2–1	(Montenegro) Dečić
Alić 28'; Hrvanović 80'	Report	Striković 3'

Petar Miloševski Training Centre, Skopje (Note: Sileks played their home match at Petar Miloševski Training Centre in Skopje, instead of their regular stadium, Gradski Stadion Kratovo, in Kratovo, which did not meet UEFA requirements.)
Attendance: 859
Referee: Viktor Shimusik (Belarus)

Dečić won 3–2 on aggregate.

10 July 2025
20:30

Sutjeska (Montenegro)	1–2	(Belarus) Dynamo Brest
Kalezić 90' (pen.)	Report	Bykov 25'; Juković 90+4' (o.g.)

Gradski stadion, Nikšić
Attendance: 3,478
Referee: Jakob Semler (Austria)
17 July 2025
20:30

Dynamo Brest (Belarus)	0–2	(Montenegro) Sutjeska
	Report	Vukčević 74'; Ćavor 89'

ZTE Arena, Zalaegerszeg, Hungary (Note: Due to the country's involvement in the Russian invasion of Ukraine, Belarusian teams were required to play their home matches at neutral venues and behind closed doors until further notice.)
Attendance: 0
Referee: Mehmet Türkmen (Turkey)

Sutjeska won 3–2 on aggregate.

10 July 2025
21:00 (20:00 UTC+1)

Larne (Northern Ireland)	0–0	(Latvia) Auda
	Report

Ballymena Showgrounds, Ballymena (Note: Larne played their home matches at Ballymena Showgrounds in Ballymena, as their own stadium, Inver Park, failed a UEFA pitch inspection.)
Attendance: 1,140
Referee: Heini Ziskason Viðoy (Faroe Islands)
16 July 2025
18:00 (19:00 UTC+3)

Auda (Latvia)	2–2 (a.e.t.)	(Northern Ireland) Larne
Traore 28'; Monteiro 53'	Report	McKendry 50'; O'Neill 66'
Penalties
Nguena (penalty missed); Jeudi (penalty scored); Varslavāns (penalty scored); Camara (penalty missed)	2–4	(penalty scored) Gallagher; (penalty scored) O'Neill; (penalty scored) Bent; (penalty scored) O'Connor

Skonto Stadium, Riga
Attendance: 1,386
Referee: Dmytro Kubiak (Ukraine)

2–2 on aggregate; Larne won 4–2 on penalties.

8 July 2025
19:30

Floriana (Malta)	2–1	(Wales) Haverfordwest County
Gamarra 42'; Grech 59' (pen.)	Report	Ahmun 27'

Centenary Stadium, Ta' Qali
Attendance: 732
Referee: Szabolcs Kovacs (Romania)
17 July 2025
17:00 (16:00 UTC+1)

Haverfordwest County (Wales)	2–3	(Malta) Floriana
Walters 11'; Ahmun 17'	Report	Lonardelli 19'; Grech 45+1' (pen.); M'Mombwa 67'

Parc y Scarlets, Llanelli (Note: Haverfordwest County played their home match at the Parc y Scarlets in Llanelli, instead of their regular stadium, the Bridge Meadow Stadium in Haverfordwest, which did not meet UEFA requirements.)
Attendance: 1,793
Referee: João Gonçalves (Portugal)

Floriana won 5–3 on aggregate.

10 July 2025
20:00

Torpedo-BelAZ Zhodino (Belarus)	3–0	(North Macedonia) Rabotnicki
Sedko 12'; Pobudey 64'; Alfred 90+2'	Report

Haladás Sportkomplexum, Szombathely, Hungary
Attendance: 0
Referee: Aleko Aptsiauri (Georgia)
17 July 2025
18:00

Rabotnicki (North Macedonia)	0–1	(Belarus) Torpedo-BelAZ Zhodino
	Report	Alfred 14'

Toše Proeski Arena, Skopje
Attendance: 700
Referee: Ion Orlic (Moldova)

Torpedo-BelAZ Zhodino won 4–0 on aggregate.

10 July 2025
17:00

Magpies (Gibraltar)	2–3	(Estonia) Paide Linnameeskond
Britto 38'; Del Rio 54'	Report	Saarma 8', 90+8' (pen.); Miller 43'

Europa Sports Park, Gibraltar (Note: Teams from Gibraltar played their home matches at Europa Sports Park, instead of the Victoria Stadium, due to renovation works.)
Attendance: 425
Referee: Paul Mclaughlin (Republic of Ireland)
17 July 2025
18:30 (19:30 UTC+3)

Paide Linnameeskond (Estonia)	4–1	(Gibraltar) Magpies
Miller 36'; Corr 66', 71'; Cham 89'	Report	Del Rio 76'

Pärnu Rannastaadion, Pärnu (Note: Paide played their home matches at the Pärnu Rannastaadion in Pärnu and Kadriorg Stadium in Tallinn, instead of their regular stadium, Paide linnastaadion, in Paide, which did not meet UEFA requirements.)
Attendance: 1,223
Referee: Klym Zabroda (Ukraine)

Paide Linnameeskond won 7–3 on aggregate.

10 July 2025
20:00

Birkirkara (Malta)	1–0	(Moldova) Petrocub Hîncești
Acheampong 54'	Report

Centenary Stadium, Ta' Qali
Attendance: 843
Referee: Vlatko Ilioski (North Macedonia)
17 July 2025
19:00 (20:00 UTC+3)

Petrocub Hîncești (Moldova)	3–0	(Malta) Birkirkara
Lupan 39', 55'; Rotaru 77'	Report

Zimbru Stadium, Chișinău (Note: Petrocub Hîncești played their home matches at the Zimbru Stadium in Chișinău, instead of their regular stadium, the Stadionul Municipal, in Hîncești, which did not meet UEFA requirements.)
Attendance: 5,034
Referee: Oguzhan Çakir (Turkey)

Petrocub Hîncești won 3–1 on aggregate.

10 July 2025
16:00

Atlètic Club d'Escaldes (Andorra)	2–0	(Luxembourg) F91 Dudelange
Gemelson 9'; Carpio 15'	Report

Estadi de la FAF, Encamp
Attendance: 188
Referee: Konstantinos Fellas (Cyprus)
17 July 2025
19:00

F91 Dudelange (Luxembourg)	2–3	(Andorra) Atlètic Club d'Escaldes
Agostinho 41'; Rotundo 71'	Report	Garcia 34'; Emanoel 74'; Valero 89'

Stade Jos Nosbaum, Dudelange
Attendance: 804
Referee: Rares Vidican (Romania)

Atlètic Club d'Escaldes won 5–2 on aggregate.

10 July 2025
22:00 (20:00 UTC+0)

Valur (Iceland)	3–0	(Estonia) Flora
Magnússon 12', 40'; J. Jónsson 45'	Report

Hlíðarendi, Reykjavík
Attendance: 981
Referee: Marius Hansen Grøtta (Norway)
17 July 2025
18:00 (19:00 UTC+3)

Flora (Estonia)	1–2	(Iceland) Valur
Sappinen 41'	Report	Haraldsson 29'; J. Jónsson 90+3'

Lilleküla Stadium, Tallinn
Attendance: 1,002
Referee: Oscar Johnson (Sweden)

Valur won 5–1 on aggregate.

10 July 2025
17:00

Malisheva (Kosovo)	0–1	(Iceland) Víkingur Reykjavík
	Report	Hansen 45+2'

Fadil Vokrri Stadium, Pristina (Note: Malisheva played their home match at the Fadil Vokrri Stadium in Pristina, instead of their regular stadium, the Liman Gegaj Stadium, in Malisheva, which did not meet UEFA requirements.)
Attendance: 1,480
Referee: Patryk Gryckiewicz (Poland)
17 July 2025
20:45 (18:45 UTC+0)

Víkingur Reykjavík (Iceland)	8–0	(Kosovo) Malisheva
Hansen 11', 21', 36'; Ekroth 29'; Hafsteinsson 42'; Ingimundarson 68'; Jónasson 72' (pen.); S. Þorkelsson 82'	Report

Víkingsvöllur, Reykjavík
Attendance: 896
Referee: Robertas Valikonis (Lithuania)

Víkingur Reykjavík won 9–0 on aggregate.

10 July 2025
18:30

Racing Union (Luxembourg)	1–2	(Georgia (country)) Dila Gori
Stolz 52'	Report	Andronikashvili 60'; Edudzi 78'

Stade Achille Hammerel, Luxembourg City
Attendance: 1,187
Referee: Seth Galia (Gibraltar)
17 July 2025
18:00 (20:00 UTC+4)

Dila Gori (Georgia (country))	1–0	(Luxembourg) Racing Union
Dramé 90+1'	Report

Tengiz Burjanadze Stadium, Gori
Attendance: 4,050
Referee: Miloš Gigovic (Bosnia and Herzegovina)

Dila Gori won 3–1 on aggregate.

10 July 2025
20:00

Vllaznia (Albania)	0–1	(Latvia) Daugavpils
	Report	Lizunovs 85'

Elbasan Arena, Elbasan (Note: Vllaznia played their first qualifying round home match at the Elbasan Arena in Elbasan, instead of their regular stadium, the Loro Boriçi Stadium, in Shkodër, due to a scheduling conflict caused by a concert.)
Attendance: 500
Referee: Ashot Ghaltakhchyan (Armenia)
17 July 2025
17:00 (18:00 UTC+3)

Daugavpils (Latvia)	2–4	(Albania) Vllaznia
Williams 33'; Diallo 35'	Report	Mensah 22'; Yago 45+1'; Dodaj 74'; Mala 87'

LNK Sporta Parks, Riga (Note: Daugavpils played their home match at LNK Sporta Parks in Riga, instead of their regular stadium, Stadions Esplanāde, in Daugavpils, which did not meet UEFA requirements.)
Attendance: 864
Referee: Karel Rouček (Czech Republic)

Vllaznia won 4–3 on aggregate.

10 July 2025
18:30 (20:30 UTC+4)

Urartu (Armenia)	1–2	(Belarus) Neman Grodno
Kaloukian 68'	Report	Suchkow 49'; Savitski 54'

Urartu Stadium, Yerevan
Attendance: 2,700
Referee: Mateo Erceg (Croatia)
17 July 2025
20:00

Neman Grodno (Belarus)	4–0	(Armenia) Urartu
Savitski 42'; Zubovich 58'; Pushnyakov 82'; Kravtsov 88'	Report

Ménfői úti Stadion, Győr, Hungary
Attendance: 0
Referee: Miloš Bošković (Montenegro)

Neman Grodno won 6–1 on aggregate.

10 July 2025
20:30

Vardar (North Macedonia)	3–0	(San Marino) La Fiorita
Omeragić 47'; Drudi 66' (o.g.); Mato 68'	Report

Toše Proeski Arena, Skopje
Attendance: 3,500
Referee: Antoine Chiaramonti (Andorra)
17 July 2025
21:00

La Fiorita (San Marino)	2–2	(North Macedonia) Vardar
Felipe 10' (pen.); Jankulov 90+3' (o.g.)	Report	Mato 59' (pen.); Grandoni 84' (o.g.)

San Marino Stadium, Serravalle
Attendance: 430
Referee: Aaron Wyn Jones (Wales)

Vardar won 5–2 on aggregate.

10 July 2025
18:00 (19:00 UTC+3)

Kauno Žalgiris (Lithuania)	3–0	(Wales) Penybont
Kircough 18' (o.g.); Sirgėdas 24'; Pavlović 46'	Report

Central Stadium of Jonava, Jonava (Note: The match was moved from Kauno Žalgiris' home ground, Darius and Girėnas Stadium, Kaunas to Jonava Stadium, Jonava due to scheduling conflict with a Guns N' Roses concert.)
Attendance: 1,372
Referee: Peiman Simani (Finland)
17 July 2025
19:00 (18:00 UTC+1)

Penybont (Wales)	1–1	(Lithuania) Kauno Žalgiris
Wood 17'	Report	Hernández 13'

Cardiff International Sports Campus, Cardiff (Note: Penybont played their home match at Cardiff International Sports Campus in Cardiff, instead of their regular stadium, Bryntirion Park, in Bridgend, which did not meet UEFA requirements.)
Attendance: 1,412
Referee: Márton Rúsz (Hungary)

Kauno Žalgiris won 4–1 on aggregate.

8 July 2025
18:00

St Joseph's (Gibraltar)	2–2	(Northern Ireland) Cliftonville
Rey 55' (pen.), 83'	Report	Curran 39'; Addis 78' (pen.)

Europa Sports Park, Gibraltar
Attendance: 758
Referee: Daniel Higraff (Norway)
17 July 2025
20:45 (19:45 UTC+1)

Cliftonville (Northern Ireland)	2–3 (a.e.t.)	(Gibraltar) St Joseph's
Glynn 32'; Gormley 65'	Report	Rodríguez 1'; González 68'; Jesslén 92'

Solitude, Belfast
Attendance: 2,386
Referee: Sven Wolfensberger (Switzerland)

St Joseph's won 5–4 on aggregate.

10 July 2025
21:00

Borac Banja Luka (Bosnia and Herzegovina)	1–4	(Andorra) FC Santa Coloma
Kulašin 71'	Report	Mourelo 29'; Cisteró 34' (pen.); Virgili 40'; León 66'

Banja Luka City Stadium, Banja Luka
Attendance: 8,152
Referee: Giorgi Avazashvili (Georgia)
17 July 2025
18:00

FC Santa Coloma (Andorra)	0–2	(Bosnia and Herzegovina) Borac Banja Luka
	Report	Herrera 71'; Perić 88'

Estadi de la FAF, Encamp
Attendance: 573
Referee: Jérémy Muller (Luxembourg)

FC Santa Coloma won 4–3 on aggregate.

== Second qualifying round ==
=== Summary ===
The first legs were played on 22, 23 and 24 July, and the second legs were played on 29 and 31 July 2025.

The winners of the ties advanced to the third qualifying round.

Second qualifying round
Team 1	Agg.	Team 2	1st leg	2nd leg
Champions Path
Víkingur Gøta (Faroe Islands)	Bye	N/A	—	—
Virtus (San Marino)	Bye	N/A	—	—
FCI Levadia (Estonia)	3–2	(Georgia (country)) Iberia 1999	1–0	2–2 (a.e.t.)
Žalgiris (Lithuania)	0–2	(Northern Ireland) Linfield	0–0	0–2
The New Saints (Wales)	0–2	(Luxembourg) Differdange 03	0–1	0–1
Olimpija Ljubljana (Slovenia)	5–3	(Andorra) Inter Club d'Escaldes	4–2	1–1
Budućnost Podgorica (Montenegro)	1–2	(Moldova) Milsami Orhei	0–0	1–2
Dinamo Minsk (Belarus)	0–3	(Albania) Egnatia	0–2	0–1
Main Path
Dundee United (Scotland)	2–0	(Luxembourg) UNA Strassen	1–0	1–0
Larne (Northern Ireland)	1–1 (5–4 p)	(Kosovo) Prishtina	0–0	1–1 (a.e.t.)
Košice (Slovakia)	3–4	(Belarus) Neman Grodno	2–3	1–1
Vaduz (Liechtenstein)	3–1	(Northern Ireland) Dungannon Swifts	0–1	3–0 (a.e.t.)
Silkeborg (Denmark)	4–3	(Iceland) KA	1–1	3–2 (a.e.t.)
Rosenborg (Norway)	7–0	(Lithuania) Banga	5–0	2–0
Atlètic Club d'Escaldes (Andorra)	2–3	(Albania) Dinamo City	1–2	1–1
Austria Wien	7–0	(Georgia (country)) Spaeri	2–0	5–0
Ballkani (Kosovo)	5–3	(Malta) Floriana	4–2	1–1
Viking (Norway)	12–3	(Slovenia) Koper	7–0	5–3
AEK Athens (Greece)	1–0	(Israel) Hapoel Be'er Sheva	1–0	0–0
Pyunik (Armenia)	3–4	(Hungary) Győri ETO	2–1	1–3
Riga (Latvia)	5–4	(Georgia (country)) Dila Gori	2–1	3–3
Raków Częstochowa (Poland)	6–1	(Slovakia) Žilina	3–0	3–1
Petrocub Hîncești (Moldova)	1–6	(Azerbaijan) Sabah	0–2	1–4
Ararat-Armenia	2–1	(Romania) Universitatea Cluj	0–0	2–1 (a.e.t.)
Varaždin (Croatia)	2–3	(Portugal) Santa Clara	2–1	0–2
Kauno Žalgiris (Lithuania)	3–2	(Iceland) Valur	1–1	2–1
Paks (Hungary)	2–1	(Slovenia) Maribor	1–0	1–1
Vllaznia (Albania)	4–5	(Iceland) Víkingur Reykjavík	2–1	2–4 (a.e.t.)
Hammarby IF (Sweden)	2–1	(Belgium) Charleroi	0–0	2–1 (a.e.t.)
Radnički 1923 (Serbia)	0–1	(Faroe Islands) KÍ	0–0	0–1
Novi Pazar (Serbia)	2–5	(Poland) Jagiellonia Białystok	1–2	1–3
Polissya Zhytomyr (Ukraine)	5–3	(Andorra) FC Santa Coloma	1–2	4–1
Vardar (North Macedonia)	2–6	(Switzerland) Lausanne-Sport	2–1	0–5
HB (Faroe Islands)	1–2	(Denmark) Brøndby	1–1	0–1
Oleksandriya (Ukraine)	0–6	(Serbia) Partizan	0–2	0–4
Hibernians (Malta)	2–7	(Slovakia) Spartak Trnava	1–2	1–5
St Patrick's Athletic (Republic of Ireland)	3–2	(Estonia) Nõmme Kalju	1–0	2–2 (a.e.t.)
Paide Linnameeskond (Estonia)	0–8 (Note: Order of legs reversed after original draw.)	(Sweden) AIK	0–2	0–6
Sarajevo (Bosnia and Herzegovina)	2–5	(Romania) Universitatea Craiova	2–1	0–4
Aris Limassol (Cyprus)	5–2	(Hungary) Puskás Akadémia	3–2	2–0
St Joseph's (Gibraltar)	0–4	(Republic of Ireland) Shamrock Rovers	0–4	0–0
Ilves (Finland)	4–8	(Netherlands) AZ	4–3	0–5
Zira (Azerbaijan)	2–3	(Croatia) Hajduk Split	1–1	1–2 (a.e.t.)
Arda (Bulgaria)	2–2 (4–3 p)	(Finland) HJK	0–0	2–2 (a.e.t.)
Aktobe (Kazakhstan)	2–5	(Czech Republic) Sparta Prague	2–1	0–4
Astana (Kazakhstan)	3–1	(Moldova) Zimbru Chișinău	1–1	2–0
Dečić (Montenegro)	2–6	(Austria) Rapid Wien	0–2	2–4
Torpedo-BelAZ Zhodino (Belarus)	1–4	(Israel) Maccabi Haifa	1–1	0–3
Araz-Naxçıvan (Azerbaijan)	4–3	(Greece) Aris	2–1	2–2
Omonia (Cyprus)	5–0	(Georgia (country)) Torpedo Kutaisi	1–0	4–0
Cherno More (Bulgaria)	0–5	(Turkey) İstanbul Başakşehir	0–1	0–4
Sutjeska (Montenegro)	3–7	(Israel) Beitar Jerusalem	1–2	2–5

=== Champions Path matches ===
23 July 2025
18:30 (19:30 UTC+3)

FCI Levadia (Estonia)	1–0	(Georgia (country)) Iberia 1999
Agyiri 80'	Report

Lilleküla Stadium, Tallinn
Attendance: 1,837
Referee: Jóhan Hendrik Ellefsen (Faroe Islands)
29 July 2025
18:00 (20:00 UTC+4)

Iberia 1999 (Georgia (country))	2–2 (a.e.t.)	(Estonia) FCI Levadia
Goshteliani 40'; Agyakwa 87'	Report	Torres 48'; Kirss 109'

Mikheil Meskhi Stadium, Tbilisi
Attendance: 2,503
Referee: Kamal Umudlu (Azerbaijan)

FCI Levadia won 3–2 on aggregate.

24 July 2025
18:00 (19:00 UTC+3)

Žalgiris (Lithuania)	0–0	(Northern Ireland) Linfield
	Report

LFF Stadium, Vilnius
Attendance: 2,387
Referee: Dumitri Muntean (Moldova)
31 July 2025
20:45 (19:45 UTC+1)

Linfield (Northern Ireland)	2–0	(Lithuania) Žalgiris
Fitzpatrick 6'; Offord 33'	Report

Windsor Park, Belfast
Attendance: 4,300
Referee: Edgars Maļcevs (Latvia)

Linfield won 2–0 on aggregate.

23 July 2025
20:00 (19:00 UTC+1)

The New Saints (Wales)	0–1	(Luxembourg) Differdange 03
	Report	Abreu 37'

Park Hall, Oswestry
Attendance: 756
Referee: Sandi Putros (Denmark)
29 July 2025
20:00

Differdange 03 (Luxembourg)	1–0	(Wales) The New Saints
Hadji 68' (pen.)	Report

Stade Municipal de la Ville de Differdange, Differdange
Attendance: 1,622
Referee: Sigurd Kringstad (Norway)

Differdange 03 won 2–0 on aggregate.

23 July 2025
20:00

Olimpija Ljubljana (Slovenia)	4–2	(Andorra) Inter Club d'Escaldes
Diogo Pinto 55', 61', 65'; Muhamedbegović 80'	Report	Bollo 13'; Rafinha 50'

Stožice Stadium, Ljubljana
Attendance: 2,651
Referee: Marek Radina (Czech Republic)
29 July 2025
20:30

Inter Club d'Escaldes (Andorra)	1–1	(Slovenia) Olimpija Ljubljana
Martín 55'	Report	Diogo Pinto 42'

Estadi de la FAF, Encamp
Attendance: 242
Referee: Lukasz Kuzma (Poland)

Olimpija Ljubljana won 5–3 on aggregate.

23 July 2025
21:00

Budućnost Podgorica (Montenegro)	0–0	(Moldova) Milsami Orhei
	Report

Podgorica City Stadium, Podgorica
Attendance: 4,234
Referee: Denys Shurman (Ukraine)
31 July 2025
19:00 (20:00 UTC+3)

Milsami Orhei (Moldova)	2–1	(Montenegro) Budućnost Podgorica
Jardan 65'; Gînsari 90+1'	Report	Bojović 55'

CSR Orhei, Orhei
Attendance: 2,853
Referee: Alessandro Dudic (Switzerland)

Milsami Orhei won 2–1 on aggregate.

24 July 2025
20:45

Dinamo Minsk (Belarus)	0–2	(Albania) Egnatia
	Report	Lushkja 28'; Bakayoko 88'

Mezőkövesdi Városi Stadion, Mezőkövesd, Hungary
Attendance: 0
Referee: Ioannis Papadopoulos (Greece)
31 July 2025
21:00

Egnatia (Albania)	1–0	(Belarus) Dinamo Minsk
Selmani 77'	Report

Egnatia Arena, Rrogozhinë
Attendance: 3,321
Referee: Kevin O'Sullivan (Republic of Ireland)

Egnatia won 3–0 on aggregate.

=== Main Path matches ===
24 July 2025
20:45 (19:45 UTC+1)

Dundee United (Scotland)	1–0	(Luxembourg) UNA Strassen
Sapsford 47'	Report

Tannadice Park, Dundee
Attendance: 11,370
Referee: Marc Nagtegaal (Netherlands)
31 July 2025
19:00

UNA Strassen (Luxembourg)	0–1	(Scotland) Dundee United
	Report	Iovu 64'

Stade Municipal de la Ville de Differdange, Differdange (Note: UNA Strassen played their home match at the Stade Municipal in Differdange, as their own stadium, Complexe Sportif Jean Wirtz, in Strassen, does not meet UEFA requirements.)
Attendance: 1,957
Referee: Vilhjalmur Thorarinsson (Iceland)

Dundee United won 2–0 on aggregate.

24 July 2025
21:00 (20:00 UTC+1)

Larne (Northern Ireland)	0–0	(Kosovo) Prishtina
	Report

Ballymena Showgrounds, Ballymena
Attendance: 1,089
Referee: Iwan Arwel Griffith (Wales)
31 July 2025
20:00

Prishtina (Kosovo)	1–1 (a.e.t.)	(Northern Ireland) Larne
Taipi 10'	Report	Bent 56'
Penalties
Ahmeti (penalty scored); Šaletić (penalty missed); Ilievski (penalty scored); Baftiu (penalty scored); Salihu (penalty scored); Bytyqi (penalty missed)	4–5	(penalty missed) Gallagher; (penalty scored) O'Connor; (penalty scored) Bent; (penalty scored) S. Graham; (penalty scored) Ferguson; (penalty scored) Donnelly

Fadil Vokrri Stadium, Pristina
Attendance: 2,463
Referee: Kyriakos Athanasiou (Cyprus)

1–1 on aggregate; Larne won 5–4 on penalties.

24 July 2025
20:00

Košice (Slovakia)	2–3	(Belarus) Neman Grodno
Miljanić 8'; Čerepkai 16'	Report	Savitsky 55', 66'; Kravtsov 79' (pen.)

Košická futbalová aréna, Košice
Attendance: 10,102
Referee: Lionel Tschudi (Switzerland)
31 July 2025
20:00

Neman Grodno (Belarus)	1–1	(Slovakia) Košice
Yevdokimov 90+1'	Report	Domik 90+3'

Szent Gellért Fórum, Szeged, Hungary
Attendance: 0
Referee: Walter Altmann (Austria)

Neman Grodno won 4–3 on aggregate.

24 July 2025
19:30

Vaduz (Liechtenstein)	0–1	(Northern Ireland) Dungannon Swifts
	Report	McAllister 54'

Rheinpark Stadion, Vaduz
Attendance: 1,138
Referee: Peter Kralović (Slovakia)
31 July 2025
20:45 (19:45 UTC+1)

Dungannon Swifts (Northern Ireland)	0–3 (a.e.t.)	(Liechtenstein) Vaduz
	Report	Hammerich 79'; Eberhard 105+3'; N. Hasler 120+2'

Solitude, Belfast (Note: Dungannon Swifts played their home match at Solitude in Belfast, as their own stadium, Stangmore Park, in Dungannon, does not meet UEFA requirements.)
Attendance: 1,189
Referee: Kristoffer Karlsson (Sweden)

Vaduz won 3–1 on aggregate.

23 July 2025
19:00

Silkeborg (Denmark)	1–1	(Iceland) KA
McCowatt 39'	Report	Ha. Steingrímsson 90+1'

JYSK Park, Silkeborg
Attendance: 3,514
Referee: Bram Van Driessche (Belgium)
31 July 2025
20:00 (18:00 UTC+0)

KA (Iceland)	2–3 (a.e.t.)	(Denmark) Silkeborg
Ha. Steingrímsson 34' (pen.); Kjartansson 86'	Report	Adamsen 54', 62', 114'

Akureyrarvöllur, Akureyri
Attendance: 495
Referee: Peiman Simani (Finland)

Silkeborg won 4–3 on aggregate.

24 July 2025
18:00

Rosenborg (Norway)	5–0	(Lithuania) Banga
Islamović 22', 61', 82'; Nordli 64'; M. Ceïde 86'	Report

Lerkendal Stadion, Trondheim
Attendance: 11,822
Referee: Ian McNabb (Northern Ireland)
31 July 2025
18:00 (19:00 UTC+3)

Banga (Lithuania)	0–2	(Norway) Rosenborg
	Report	Nordli 61'; Holm 64'

Gargždai Stadium, Gargždai
Attendance: 1,932
Referee: Jovan Kacevski (North Macedonia)

Rosenborg won 7–0 on aggregate.

24 July 2025
16:00

Atlètic Club d'Escaldes (Andorra)	1–2	(Albania) Dinamo City
Gemelson 43'	Report	Zabërgja 65'; Qardaku 86'

Estadi de la FAF, Encamp
Attendance: 150
Referee: Tim Marshall (Northern Ireland)
31 July 2025
20:45

Dinamo City (Albania)	1–1	(Andorra) Atlètic Club d'Escaldes
Zabërgja 18'	Report	Berlanga 49'

Elbasan Arena, Elbasan
Attendance: 420
Referee: Jasmin Sabotic (Luxembourg)

Dinamo City won 3–2 on aggregate.

24 July 2025
20:30

Austria Wien	2–0	(Georgia (country)) Spaeri
Fischer 8'; Fitz 90+1' (pen.)	Report

Franz Horr Stadium, Vienna
Attendance: 8,951
Referee: Martin Dohal (Slovakia)
31 July 2025
18:00 (20:00 UTC+4)

Spaeri (Georgia (country))	0–5	Austria Wien
	Report	Plavotić 40'; Fitz 43'; Malone 45+2' (pen.), 55'; Eggestein 72'

Mikheil Meskhi Stadium, Tbilisi (Note: Spaeri played their home match at Mikheil Meskhi Stadium, instead of their regular stadium, Spaeri Stadium, which did not meet UEFA requirements.)
Attendance: 916
Referee: Ashot Ghaltakhchyan (Armenia)

Austria Wien won 7–0 on aggregate.

22 July 2025
20:30

Ballkani (Kosovo)	4–2	(Malta) Floriana
Tolaj 13', 32'; Adetunji 27', 76'	Report	Grech 8' (pen.); Jah 25'

Fadil Vokrri Stadium, Pristina (Note: Ballkani played their home match at the Fadil Vokrri Stadium in Pristina, instead of their regular stadium, the Suva Reka City Stadium, in Suva Reka, which did not meet UEFA requirements.)
Attendance: 2,700
Referee: Gergo Bogár (Hungary)
31 July 2025
20:45

Floriana (Malta)	1–1	(Kosovo) Ballkani
Vella 38'	Report	Adetunji 45+1'

Centenary Stadium, Ta' Qali
Attendance: 685
Referee: Dario Bel (Croatia)

Ballkani won 5–3 on aggregate.

24 July 2025
19:00

Viking (Norway)	7–0	(Slovenia) Koper
Svendsen 6', 59'; Bærtelsen 57'; Tripić 68'; Mikaelsson 78' (pen.), 85'; Bjørshol 90+3'	Report

Viking Stadion, Stavanger
Attendance: 7,744
Referee: Sam Barrott (England)
31 July 2025
20:00

Koper (Slovenia)	3–5	(Norway) Viking
D. Jurić 3' (pen.), 45'; Manseri 56'	Report	Svendsen 19', 52', 90'; Austbø 76', 89'

Bonifika Stadium, Koper
Attendance: 1,016
Referee: Cláudio Filipe Ruivo Pereira (Portugal)

Viking won 12–3 on aggregate.

24 July 2025
20:00 (21:00 UTC+3)

AEK Athens (Greece)	1–0	(Israel) Hapoel Be'er Sheva
Relvas 50'	Report

Agia Sophia Stadium, Athens
Attendance: 21,123
Referee: Luca Pairetto (Italy)
31 July 2025
20:00

Hapoel Be'er Sheva (Israel)	0–0	(Greece) AEK Athens
	Report

Nagyerdei Stadion, Debrecen, Hungary (Note: Due to the Gaza war, Israeli teams were required to play their home matches at neutral venues until further notice.)
Attendance: 431
Referee: Urs Schnyder (Switzerland)

AEK Athens won 1–0 on aggregate.

24 July 2025
18:00 (20:00 UTC+4)

Pyunik (Armenia)	2–1	(Hungary) Győri ETO
Noubissi 22' (pen.); Kulikov 66'	Report	Miljković 78' (o.g.)

Vazgen Sargsyan Republican Stadium, Yerevan
Attendance: 7,150
Referee: Jasmin Sabotic (Luxembourg)
31 July 2025
18:00

Győri ETO (Hungary)	3–1	(Armenia) Pyunik
Benbouali 16', 69'; Štefulj 90'	Report	Ocansey 84'

ETO Park, Győr
Attendance: 5,055
Referee: Mervan Bejtullahu (Kosovo)

Győri ETO won 4–3 on aggregate.

24 July 2025
19:00 (20:00 UTC+3)

Riga (Latvia)	2–1	(Georgia (country)) Dila Gori
Ramires 45+6'; Siqueira 66'	Report	Ngom 86' (o.g.)

Skonto Stadium, Riga
Attendance: 4,123
Referee: Donald Robertson (Scotland)
31 July 2025
18:00 (20:00 UTC+4)

Dila Gori (Georgia (country))	3–3	(Latvia) Riga
João Araújo 15'; Bassinga 51'; Anoff 81'	Report	Ramires 45+7' (pen.); Musah 64'; Černomordijs 90+6'

Tengiz Burjanadze Stadium, Gori
Attendance: 3,635
Referee: Mohammad Usman Aslam (Norway)

Riga won 5–4 on aggregate.

24 July 2025
21:00

Raków Częstochowa (Poland)	3–0	(Slovakia) Žilina
Repka 48'; Brunes 58' (pen.); Diaby-Fadiga 73'	Report

Miejski Stadion Piłkarski Raków, Częstochowa
Attendance: 5,240
Referee: Fabio Verissimo (Portugal)
31 July 2025
20:30

Žilina (Slovakia)	1–3	(Poland) Raków Częstochowa
Ďuriš 13'	Report	Makuch 37'; Brunes 52'; Diaby-Fadiga 72'

Štadión pod Dubňom, Žilina
Attendance: 4,229
Referee: Genc Nuza (Kosovo)

Raków Częstochowa won 6–1 on aggregate.

24 July 2025
19:00 (20:00 UTC+3)

Petrocub Hîncești (Moldova)	0–2	(Azerbaijan) Sabah
	Report	Šafranko 82'; Parris 90'

Zimbru Stadium, Chișinău
Attendance: 4,953
Referee: Gai Leibovich (Israel)
31 July 2025
18:00 (20:00 UTC+4)

Sabah (Azerbaijan)	4–1	(Moldova) Petrocub Hîncești
Mickels 22', 28', 44'; Šafranko 45+1'	Report	Solvet 41' (o.g.)

Bank Respublika Arena, Masazir
Attendance: 5,621
Referee: Danilo Nikolić (Serbia)

Sabah won 6–1 on aggregate.

24 July 2025
18:00 (20:00 UTC+4)

Ararat-Armenia	0–0	(Romania) Universitatea Cluj
	Report

Yerevan Football Academy Stadium, Yerevan
Attendance: 1,450
Referee: Dzmitry Dzmitryieu (Belarus)
31 July 2025
19:00 (20:00 UTC+3)

Universitatea Cluj (Romania)	1–2 (a.e.t.)	Ararat-Armenia
Lukić 13'	Report	Hovhannisyan 53'; Ayongo 117'

Sibiu Municipal Stadium, Sibiu (Note: Universitatea Cluj played their home match at the Sibiu Municipal Stadium in Sibiu, instead of their regular stadium, Cluj Arena, in Cluj-Napoca, due to scheduling conflict with the Untold Festival.)
Attendance: 10,158
Referee: David Fuxman (Israel)

Ararat-Armenia won 2–1 on aggregate.

24 July 2025
20:00

Varaždin (Croatia)	2–1	(Portugal) Santa Clara
Mamut 10' (pen.); Dabro 85'	Report	Adriano 55'

Stadion Varteks, Varaždin
Attendance: 5,031
Referee: Luca Cibelli (Switzerland)
31 July 2025
20:00 (18:00 UTC+0)

Santa Clara (Portugal)	2–0	(Croatia) Varaždin
Lopes 5'; Silva 68'	Report

Estádio de São Miguel, Ponta Delgada
Attendance: 4,053
Referee: Jasper Vergoote (Belgium)

Santa Clara won 3–2 on aggregate.

24 July 2025
18:00 (19:00 UTC+3)

Kauno Žalgiris (Lithuania)	1–1	(Iceland) Valur
Jansonas 58'	Report	Haraldsson 88'

Darius and Girėnas Stadium, Kaunas
Attendance: 3,723
Referee: Jamie Robinson (Northern Ireland)
31 July 2025
20:30 (18:30 UTC+0)

Valur (Iceland)	1–2	(Lithuania) Kauno Žalgiris
Ómarsson 45+4'	Report	Chogadze 38'; Benchaib 51'

Hlíðarendi, Reykjavík
Attendance: 886
Referee: Dalibor Černý (Czech Republic)

Kauno Žalgiris won 3–2 on aggregate.

24 July 2025
19:00

Paks (Hungary)	1–0	(Slovenia) Maribor
Windecker 52'	Report

Fehérvári úti Stadion, Paks
Attendance: 2,398
Referee: Rob Harvey (Republic of Ireland)
31 July 2025
20:00

Maribor (Slovenia)	1–1	(Hungary) Paks
Tshipamba 34'	Report	Papp 57'

Ljudski vrt, Maribor
Attendance: 6,000
Referee: Dennis Higler (Netherlands)

Paks won 2–1 on aggregate.

24 July 2025
20:30

Vllaznia (Albania)	2–1	(Iceland) Víkingur Reykjavík
Bajrami 67'; Mala 75'	Report	Gunnarsson 10'

Loro Boriçi Stadium, Shkodër
Attendance: 5,320
Referee: Alexandros Tsakalidis (Greece)
31 July 2025
20:45 (18:45 UTC+0)

Víkingur Reykjavík (Iceland)	4–2 (a.e.t.)	(Albania) Vllaznia
Hafsteinsson 10'; Hansen 55', 86'; R. Þorkelsson 94'	Report	Balaj 26' (pen.), 85' (pen.)

Víkingsvöllur, Reykjavík
Attendance: 876
Referee: Mihály Káprály (Hungary)

Víkingur Reykjavík won 5–4 on aggregate.

24 July 2025
19:00

Hammarby IF (Sweden)	0–0	(Belgium) Charleroi
	Report

3Arena, Stockholm
Attendance: 20,855
Referee: Mathieu Vernice (France)
31 July 2025
20:00

Charleroi (Belgium)	1–2 (a.e.t.)	(Sweden) Hammarby IF
Štulić 47'	Report	Erabi 21'; Eriksson 120'

Stade du Pays de Charleroi, Charleroi
Attendance: 12,842
Referee: Vitālijs Spasjoņņikovs (Latvia)

Hammarby IF won 2–1 on aggregate.

24 July 2025
20:00

Radnički 1923 (Serbia)	0–0	(Faroe Islands) KÍ
	Report

Čika Dača Stadium, Kragujevac
Attendance: 8,423
Referee: Bence Csonka (Hungary)
31 July 2025
20:45 (19:45 UTC+1)

KÍ (Faroe Islands)	1–0	(Serbia) Radnički 1923
Klettskarð 39'	Report

Við Djúpumýrar, Klaksvík
Attendance: 1,493
Referee: Roman Jitari (Moldova)

KÍ won 1–0 on aggregate.

24 July 2025
19:00

Novi Pazar (Serbia)	1–2	(Poland) Jagiellonia Białystok
Opara 19'	Report	Rallis 9'; Pululu 90+5'

Novi Pazar City Stadium, Novi Pazar
Attendance: 6,271
Referee: Matthew De Gabriele (Malta)
31 July 2025
20:15

Jagiellonia Białystok (Poland)	3–1	(Serbia) Novi Pazar
Pululu 50', 73' (pen.); Romanczuk 90+4'	Report	Abdullahi 85'

Stadion Miejski, Białystok
Attendance: 16,128
Referee: Atilla Karaoglan (Turkey)

Jagiellonia Białystok won 5–2 on aggregate.

24 July 2025
19:00

Polissya Zhytomyr (Ukraine)	1–2	(Andorra) FC Santa Coloma
Hutsulyak 21'	Report	Remolins 27'; Crespo 44'

Futbal Tatran Arena, Prešov, Slovakia (Note: Due to the Russian invasion of Ukraine, Ukrainian teams were required to play their home matches at neutral venues until further notice.)
Attendance: 1,052
Referee: Jacob Karlsen (Denmark)
31 July 2025
18:00

FC Santa Coloma (Andorra)	1–4	(Ukraine) Polissya Zhytomyr
Krushynskyi 49' (o.g.)	Report	Mykhaylichenko 4'; Filippov 48'; Andrievskyi 60'; Hayduchyk 77'

Estadi de la FAF, Encamp
Attendance: 551
Referee: Ben Mcmaster (Northern Ireland)

Polissya Zhytomyr won 5–3 on aggregate.

24 July 2025
20:30

Vardar (North Macedonia)	2–1	(Switzerland) Lausanne-Sport
Mato 45+2'; Omeragić 78'	Report	Diakité 58'

Toše Proeski Arena, Skopje
Attendance: 6,642
Referee: Dominik Starý (Czech Republic)
31 July 2025
20:15

Lausanne-Sport (Switzerland)	5–0	(North Macedonia) Vardar
Dussenne 16'; Sène 33', 45+2'; Ajdini 55'; Traoré 84'	Report

Stade de la Tuilière, Lausanne
Attendance: 9,051
Referee: Snir Levy (Israel)

Lausanne-Sport won 6–2 on aggregate.

24 July 2025
20:45 (19:45 UTC+1)

HB (Faroe Islands)	1–1	(Denmark) Brøndby
Thomsen 89'	Report	Bundgaard 62'

Tórsvøllur, Tórshavn (Note: HB Tórshavn played their home match at Tórsvøllur, instead of their regular stadium, Gundadalur, which did not meet UEFA requirements.)
Attendance: 3,589
Referee: Joakim Östling (Sweden)
31 July 2025
19:30

Brøndby (Denmark)	1–0	(Faroe Islands) HB
Fukuda 31'	Report

Brøndby Stadium, Brøndbyvester
Attendance: 20,815
Referee: Rob Hennessy (Republic of Ireland)

Brøndby won 2–1 on aggregate.

24 July 2025
19:00

Oleksandriya (Ukraine)	0–2	(Serbia) Partizan
	Report	B. Kostić 14'; Ugrešić 56'

Arena Katowice, Katowice, Poland
Attendance: 776
Referee: Joonas Jaanovits (Estonia)
31 July 2025
21:00

Partizan (Serbia)	4–0	(Ukraine) Oleksandriya
J. Milošević 13', 23', 45'; Vukotić 63'	Report

Partizan Stadium, Belgrade
Attendance: 27,775
Referee: Henrik Nalbandyan (Armenia)

Partizan won 6–0 on aggregate.

24 July 2025
18:00

Hibernians (Malta)	1–2	(Slovakia) Spartak Trnava
Charleston 79'	Report	Holík 27'; Procházka 84' (pen.)

Tony Bezzina Stadium, Paola
Attendance: 723
Referee: Visar Kastrati (Kosovo)
31 July 2025
17:30

Spartak Trnava (Slovakia)	5–1	(Malta) Hibernians
Holík 4'; Škrbo 13'; Tomič 47'; Pedrão 54' (o.g.); Azango 57'	Report	Miullen 37'

Anton Malatinský Stadium, Trnava
Attendance: 9,310
Referee: Pavle Ilić (Serbia)

Spartak Trnava won 7–2 on aggregate.

24 July 2025
20:45 (19:45 UTC+1)

St Patrick's Athletic (Republic of Ireland)	1–0	(Estonia) Nõmme Kalju
Forrester 90'	Report

Richmond Park, Dublin
Attendance: 2,330
Referee: Ladislav Szikszay (Czech Republic)
31 July 2025
18:45 (19:45 UTC+3)

Nõmme Kalju (Estonia)	2–2 (a.e.t.)	(Republic of Ireland) St Patrick's Athletic
Patrikejevs 43'; Männilaan 49'	Report	Redmond 90+1'; Mulraney 93'

Lilleküla Stadium, Tallinn (Note: Nõmme Kalju played their Second Round home match at Lilleküla Stadium, instead of their regular stadium, Hiiu Stadium, which did not meet UEFA requirements.)
Attendance: 2,866
Referee: Menelaos Antoniou (Cyprus)

St Patrick's Athletic won 3–2 on aggregate.

24 July 2025
18:30 (19:30 UTC+3)

Paide Linnameeskond (Estonia)	0–2	(Sweden) AIK
	Report	Celina 7'; Csongvai 68'

Kadriorg Stadium, Tallinn
Attendance: 3,286
Referee: Joni Hyytiä (Finland)
31 July 2025
19:00

AIK (Sweden)	6–0	(Estonia) Paide Linnameeskond
Baranov 16' (o.g.); Miller 24' (o.g.); Hove 45', 54'; Salétros 50' (pen.), 76'	Report

Strawberry Arena, Stockholm
Attendance: 16,374
Referee: Helgi Mikael Jónasson (Iceland)

AIK won 8–0 on aggregate.

24 July 2025
21:00

Sarajevo (Bosnia and Herzegovina)	2–1	(Romania) Universitatea Craiova
Kyeremeh 10'; Guliashvili 20'	Report	Romanchuk 69'

Koševo City Stadium, Sarajevo
Attendance: 20,897
Referee: Dmytro Panchyshyn (Ukraine)
31 July 2025
19:30 (20:30 UTC+3)

Universitatea Craiova (Romania)	4–0	(Bosnia and Herzegovina) Sarajevo
Al Hamlawi 51', 79', 83'; Cicâldău 68'	Report

Ion Oblemenco Stadium, Craiova
Attendance: 19,640
Referee: Daniyar Sakhi (Kazakhstan)

Universitatea Craiova won 5–2 on aggregate.

24 July 2025
18:00 (19:00 UTC+3)

Aris Limassol (Cyprus)	3–2	(Hungary) Puskás Akadémia
Montnor 6'; Kvilitaia 16' (pen.); Semedo 87'	Report	Colley 78', 81'

Alphamega Stadium, Limassol
Attendance: 1,620
Referee: David Šmajc (Slovenia)
31 July 2025
20:00

Puskás Akadémia (Hungary)	0–2	(Cyprus) Aris Limassol
	Report	Kvilitaia 77'; Kakoullis 78'

Pancho Aréna, Felcsút
Attendance: 1,986
Referee: Robertas Valikonis (Lithuania)

Aris Limassol won 5–2 on aggregate.

24 July 2025
18:00

St Joseph's (Gibraltar)	0–4	(Republic of Ireland) Shamrock Rovers
	Report	Gaffney 13'; Mandroiu 67'; McGovern 73'; Byrne 75'

Europa Sports Park, Gibraltar
Attendance: 632
Referee: Matthew MacDermid (Scotland)
31 July 2025
21:00 (20:00 UTC+1)

Shamrock Rovers (Republic of Ireland)	0–0	(Gibraltar) St Joseph's
	Report

Tallaght Stadium, Dublin
Attendance: 5,128
Referee: Granit Maqedonci (Sweden)

Shamrock Rovers won 4–0 on aggregate.

24 July 2025
18:00 (19:00 UTC+3)

Ilves (Finland)	4–3	(Netherlands) AZ
Riski 8', 45+2'; Akinyemi 68'; Söderbäck 71'	Report	Parrott 16'; Mijnans 61'; Meerdink 90+1'

Tammelan Stadion, Tampere
Attendance: 5,413
Referee: Matteo Marcenaro (Italy)
31 July 2025
18:45

AZ (Netherlands)	5–0	(Finland) Ilves
Parrott 22', 26'; Poku 36'; Kasius 42'; De Wit 74'	Report

AFAS Stadion, Alkmaar
Attendance: 13,057
Referee: Ivar Orri Kristjansson (Iceland)

AZ won 8–4 on aggregate.

23 July 2025
17:30 (19:30 UTC+4)

Zira (Azerbaijan)	1–1	(Croatia) Hajduk Split
Konaté 31'	Report	Kalik 68'

Neftçi Arena, Baku (Note: Zira played their home match at the Neftçi Arena in Baku, instead of their regular stadium, the Zira Olympic Sport Complex Stadium, in Zirə, which did not meet UEFA requirements.)
Attendance: 5,232
Referee: Christos Vergetis (Greece)
31 July 2025
21:00

Hajduk Split (Croatia)	2–1 (a.e.t.)	(Azerbaijan) Zira
Krovinović 19'; Benrahou 95'	Report	Djibrilla 90+3'

Stadion Poljud, Split
Attendance: 30,086
Referee: Luca Pairetto (Italy)

Hajduk Split won 3–2 on aggregate.

24 July 2025
18:00 (19:00 UTC+3)

Arda (Bulgaria)	0–0	(Finland) HJK
	Report

Arena Arda, Kardzhali
Attendance: 3,500
Referee: Bulat Sariyev (Kazakhstan)
31 July 2025
18:00 (19:00 UTC+3)

HJK (Finland)	2–2 (a.e.t.)	(Bulgaria) Arda
Meriluoto 38'; Pukki 69'	Report	Idowu 25'; Karagaren 86'
Penalties
Pukki (penalty scored); Michel (penalty missed); Hostikka (penalty scored); Ring (penalty scored); Antzoulas (penalty missed)	3–4	(penalty scored) Vutov; (penalty scored) Velkovski; (penalty scored) Kotev; (penalty missed) Idowu; (penalty scored) Shinyashiki

Töölö Football Stadium, Helsinki
Attendance: 7,587
Referee: Iwan Arwel Griffith (Wales)

2–2 on aggregate; Arda won 4–3 on penalties.

24 July 2025
18:00 (21:00 UTC+5)

Aktobe (Kazakhstan)	2–1	(Czech Republic) Sparta Prague
Sosah 29'; Omirtayev 83'	Report	Birmančević 90' (pen.)

Central Stadium, Aktobe
Attendance: 12,100
Referee: Kristoffer Hagenes (Norway)
31 July 2025
20:00

Sparta Prague (Czech Republic)	4–0	(Kazakhstan) Aktobe
Birmančević 57'; Ryneš 60'; Kuchta 64'; Rrahmani 90+4'	Report

Stadion Letná, Prague
Attendance: 17,235
Referee: Daniele Chiffi (Italy)

Sparta Prague won 5–2 on aggregate.

24 July 2025
16:00 (19:00 UTC+5)

Astana (Kazakhstan)	1–1	(Moldova) Zimbru Chișinău
Bašić 56'	Report	Dahan 45+1'

Astana Arena, Astana
Attendance: 23,524
Referee: Amine Kourgheli (Belarus)
31 July 2025
19:00 (20:00 UTC+3)

Zimbru Chișinău (Moldova)	0–2	(Kazakhstan) Astana
	Report	Chinedu 18'; Camara 21'

Zimbru Stadium, Chișinău
Attendance: 8,572
Referee: Bram Van Driessche (Belgium)

Astana won 3–1 on aggregate.

24 July 2025
21:00

Dečić (Montenegro)	0–2	(Austria) Rapid Wien
	Report	Horn 17'; Seidl 40' (pen.)

Stadion Tuško Polje, Tuzi
Attendance: 980
Referee: Kadir Sağlam (Turkey)
31 July 2025
20:30

Rapid Wien (Austria)	4–2	(Montenegro) Dečić
Dahl 17'; Radulović 27'; Weixelbraun 69'; Mbuyi 71'	Report	Striković 60'; Sekulović 82'

Allianz Stadion, Vienna
Attendance: 16,217
Referee: Dumitri Muntean (Moldova)

Rapid Wien won 6–2 on aggregate.

24 July 2025
20:00

Torpedo-BelAZ Zhodino (Belarus)	1–1	(Israel) Maccabi Haifa
Premudrov 48'	Report	Seck 45+1'

Haladás Sportkomplexum, Szombathely, Hungary
Attendance: 0
Referee: Jakob Semler (Austria)
31 July 2025
20:00

Maccabi Haifa (Israel)	3–0	(Belarus) Torpedo-BelAZ Zhodino
Saba 14'; Haziza 22'; Stewart 78'	Report

Várkerti Stadion, Kisvárda, Hungary
Attendance: 244
Referee: Sam Barrott (England)

Maccabi Haifa won 4–1 on aggregate.

24 July 2025
18:00 (20:00 UTC+4)

Araz-Naxçıvan (Azerbaijan)	2–1	(Greece) Aris
Santos 75'; Andrade 78'	Report	Morón 66'

Dalga Arena, Baku (Note: Araz-Naxçıvan played their home match at the Neftçi Arena in Baku, instead of their regular stadium, the Nakhchivan City Stadium, in Nakhchivan, which did not meet UEFA requirements.)
Attendance: 1,800
Referee: Andrei Chivulete (Romania)
31 July 2025
20:15 (21:15 UTC+3)

Aris (Greece)	2–2	(Azerbaijan) Araz-Naxçıvan
Leismann 62'; Monchu 90'	Report	Boli 11'; Santos 38' (pen.)

Kleanthis Vikelidis Stadium, Thessaloniki
Attendance: 14,897
Referee: David Dickinson (Scotland)

Araz-Naxçıvan won 4–3 on aggregate.

24 July 2025
19:00 (20:00 UTC+3)

Omonia (Cyprus)	1–0	(Georgia (country)) Torpedo Kutaisi
Jovetić 20'	Report

GSP Stadium, Nicosia
Attendance: 8,714
Referee: Lukas Fähndrich (Switzerland)
31 July 2025
19:00 (21:00 UTC+4)

Torpedo Kutaisi (Georgia (country))	0–4	(Cyprus) Omonia
	Report	Jovetić 30', 63'; Semedo 47', 78'

Ramaz Shengelia Stadium, Kutaisi
Attendance: 10,083
Referee: Mikkel Redder (Denmark)

Omonia won 5–0 on aggregate.

24 July 2025
19:00 (20:00 UTC+3)

Cherno More (Bulgaria)	0–1	(Turkey) İstanbul Başakşehir
	Report	Şahiner 52'

Huvepharma Arena, Razgrad (Note: Cherno More played their home match at the Huvepharma Arena in Razgrad, instead of their regular stadium, Stadion Ticha, in Varna, which did not meet UEFA requirements.)
Attendance: 3,601
Referee: Luka Bilbija (Bosnia and Herzegovina)
31 July 2025
19:45 (20:45 UTC+3)

İstanbul Başakşehir (Turkey)	4–0	(Bulgaria) Cherno More
Brnić 17'; Crespo 31'; Da Costa 36'; Opéri 80'	Report

Başakşehir Fatih Terim Stadium, Istanbul
Attendance: 7,158
Referee: Viktor Kopiievskyi (Ukraine)

İstanbul Başakşehir won 5–0 on aggregate.

24 July 2025
20:30

Sutjeska (Montenegro)	1–2	(Israel) Beitar Jerusalem
Tošković 28'	Report	Shua 34'; Atzili 87'

Gradski stadion, Nikšić
Attendance: 3,850
Referee: Georgi Ginchev (Bulgaria)
31 July 2025
19:30 (20:30 UTC+3)

Beitar Jerusalem (Israel)	5–2	(Montenegro) Sutjeska
Atzili 42'; Shua 45+5'; Morozov 51'; Kalu 83'; Muzie 88'	Report	Tošković 11' (pen.); Kopitović 28'

Ilie Oană Stadium, Ploiești, Romania
Attendance: 1,300
Referee: Ishmael Barbara (Malta)

Beitar Jerusalem won 7–3 on aggregate.
