= Republic of Ireland national football team – record in major tournaments =

This page covers the record of the Republic of Ireland national football team in the FIFA World Cup, European Football Championship and UEFA Nations League. In the "Results" section, home results are written before away results. Where the Republic of Ireland only played a team once, (h), (a) and (n) indicate home, away or neutral respectively.

== Results ==
=== Qualification (including UEFA Nations League) ===
Tournament	Section	Placing	Results	Notes
World Cup Uruguay 1930	Did not enter			Only 4 European teams entered the first World Cup.
World Cup Italy 1934	Group 7: 3 teams, 2 qualify	3rd, 1pt/4	Netherlands 2–5 (a); Belgium 4–4 (h)	Competed as "Irish Free State". Paddy Moore (v. Belgium) became the first player anywhere to score 4 goals in a World Cup match.
World Cup France 1938	Group 2a: 2 teams, 1 qualifies	2nd, 1pt/4	Norway 3–3, 2–3	Ireland lost.
World Cup Brazil 1950	Group 5: 3 teams, 1 qualifies	2nd, 3pts/8	Sweden 1–3, 1–3; Finland 3–0, 1–1	After 3 qualified teams withdrew, FIFA invited the FAI to compete as a replacement: they declined.
World Cup Switzerland 1954	Group 4: 3 teams, 1 qualifies	2nd, 4pts/8	France 3–5, 0–1; Luxembourg 4–0, 1–0	Republic of Ireland performed poorly.
World Cup Sweden 1958	Group 1: 3 teams, 1 qualifies	2nd, 5pts/8	England 1–1, 1–5; Denmark 2–1, 2–0	Republic of Ireland came close to victory.
Euro 1960, France	knockout, must win 3 rounds	Lost in preliminary round	Czechoslovakia 2–0, 0–4	This was the only fixture of the preliminary round, but was played after several first-round matches.
World Cup Chile 1962	Group 8: 3 teams, 1 qualifies	3rd, 0pts/8	Czechoslovakia 1–3, 1–7; Scotland 0–3, 1–4	The only qualifying tournament in which the Republic of Ireland team had a 0% record.
Euro 1964, Spain	knockout, must win 3 rounds	Lost in Quarter-finals	Preliminary: Iceland 4–2, 1–1; Last 16: Austria 3–2, 0–0; Quarter-final: Spain 0–2, 1–5	
World Cup England 1966	Group 9: 2 teams, 1 qualifies	Tied; Lost playoff	Spain 1–0, 1–4; Playoff: Spain 0–1 (n)	Syria were originally in the group as well, but withdrew in protest at the lack of qualifying places for Asian and African teams. Goal difference did not count, so a playoff was played in Stade Colombes, Paris.
Euro 1968, Italy	Group 1: 4 teams, 1 goes on to playoff	3rd, 5pts/12	Spain 0–0, 0–2; Czechoslovakia 0–2, 2–1; Turkey 2–1, 1–2	
World Cup Mexico 1970	Group 2: 4 teams, 2 qualify	4th, 1pt/12	Hungary 1–2, 0–4; Czechoslovakia 1–2, 0–3; Denmark 1–1, 0–2	Home fixture against Denmark was abandoned at 51 minutes with the score 1–1 due to fog. It was replayed ten months later and the score was 1–1.
Euro 1972, Belgium	Group 6: 4 teams, 1 goes on to playoff	4th, 1pt/12	Italy 1–2, 0–3; Austria 1–4, 0–6; Sweden 1–1, 0–1	
World Cup West Germany 1974	Group 9: 3 teams, 1 qualifies	2nd, 3pts/8	Soviet Union 1–2, 0–1; France 2–1, 1–1	
Euro 1976, Yugoslavia	Group 6: 4 teams, 1 goes on to playoff	2nd, 7pts/12	Soviet Union 3–0, 1–2; Turkey 4–0, 1–1; Switzerland 2–1, 0–1	Don Givens scored all 7 goals in the wins over USSR and Turkey.
World Cup Argentina 1978	Group 5: 3 teams, 1 qualifies	3rd, 3pts/8	France 1–0, 0–2; Bulgaria 0–0, 1–2	
Euro 1980, Italy	Group 1: 5 teams, 1 qualifies	3rd, 7pts/16	England 1–1, 0–2; Northern Ireland 0–0, 0–1; Bulgaria 3–0, 0–1; Denmark 2–0, 3–3	The first-ever matches against Northern Ireland.
World Cup Spain 1982	Group 2: 5 teams, 2 qualify	3rd, 10pts/16	Belgium 1–1, 0–1; France 3–2, 0–2; Netherlands 2–1, 2–2; Cyprus 6–0, 3–2	Lost on goal difference to France in a tough and tight group. Fans lamented some controversial refereeing decisions.
Euro 1984, France	Group 7: 5 teams, 1 qualifies	3rd, 9pts/16	Netherlands 2–3, 1–2; Spain 3–3, 0–2; Iceland 2–0, 3–0; Malta 8–0, 1–0	8–0 v. Malta is the Republic of Ireland team's record victory.
World Cup Mexico 1986	Group 6: 5 teams, 2 qualify	4th, 6pts/16	Denmark 1–4, 0–3; Soviet Union 1–0, 0–2; Switzerland 3–0, 0–0; Norway 0–0, 0–1	Pat Byrne of Shamrock Rovers played against Denmark in November 1985; he was the last League of Ireland player to play a competitive game until Jack Byrne in 2020.
Euro 1988, West Germany	Group 7: 5 teams, 1 qualifies	1st, 11pts/16 QUALIFIED	Bulgaria 2–0, 1–2; Belgium 0–0, 2–2; Scotland 0–0, 1–0; Luxembourg 2–1, 2–0	Qualified with the help of a surprise 1–0 win for Scotland in Bulgaria in the last match.
World Cup Italy 1990	Group 6: 5 teams, 2 qualify	2nd, 12pts/16 QUALIFIED	Spain 1–0, 0–2; Hungary 2–0, 0–0; Northern Ireland 3–0, 0–0; Malta 2–0, 2–0	
Euro 1992, Sweden	Group 7: 4 teams, 1 qualifies	2nd, 8pts/12	England 1–1, 1–1; Poland 0–0, 3–3; Turkey 5–0, 3–1	The team's first ever unbeaten qualifying series: and yet they didn't progress.
World Cup USA 1994	Group 3: 7 teams, 2 qualify	2nd, 18pts/24 QUALIFIED	Spain 1–3, 0–0; Denmark 1–1, 0–0; Northern Ireland 3–0, 1–1; Lithuania 2–0, 1–0; Latvia 4–0, 2–0; Albania 2–0, 2–1	Finished exactly level with Denmark on points and goal difference, only separated by Goals scored. A linesman incorrectly ruled out a John Aldridge 'goal' in a 0–0 draw with group winners Spain in Seville.
Euro 1996, England	Group 6: 6 teams, 1 qualifies Six 2nd place teams qualify Two 2nd place teams have playoff	2nd, 17pts/30 Ranked 8th of 8 runners-up Lost playoff	Portugal 1–0, 0–3; Northern Ireland 1–1, 4–0; Austria 1–3, 1–3; Latvia 2–1, 3–0; Liechtenstein 4–0, 0–0; Playoff: Netherlands 0–2 (n)	0–0 v. Liechtenstein is remembered as one of the team's worst results of all time. The playoff was held in Anfield, Liverpool.
World Cup France 1998	Group 8: 6 teams, 1 qualifies One 2nd place team qualifies Eight 2nd place teams have playoffs	2nd, 18pts/30 Lost playoff	Romania 1–1, 0–1; Lithuania 0–0, 2–1; Macedonia 3–0, 2–3; Iceland 0–0, 4–2; Liechtenstein 5–0, 5–0; Playoff: Belgium 1–1, 1–2	Scraped into the playoffs largely due to Tony Cascarino's 7 goals in 10 games. 5–0 v. Liechtenstein is the team's record away win.
Euro 2000, Netherlands & Belgium	Group 8: 6 teams, 1 qualifies One 2nd place team qualifies Eight 2nd place teams have playoffs	2nd, 16pts/24 Lost playoff	FR Yugoslavia 2–1, 0–1; Croatia 2–0, 0–1; Macedonia 1–0, 1–1; Malta 5–0, 3–2; Playoff: Turkey 1–1, 0–0 (Turkey won on away goals)	The FAI originally cancelled the home match against FR Yugoslavia, after the government refused entry visas to the opposing team purportedly due to the NATO assault on Yugoslavia
World Cup South Korea & Japan 2002	Group 2: 7 teams, 1 qualifies, 2nd gets a playoff	2nd, 24pts/30 Won playoff QUALIFIED	Portugal 1–1, 1–1; Netherlands 1–0, 2–2; Estonia 2–0, 2–0; Cyprus 4–0, 4–0; Andorra 3–1, 3–0; Playoff: Iran 2–0, 0–1	Of the 25 goals scored in qualifying, only 4 were scored by strikers: 2 by Robbie Keane, 1 by David Connolly and 1 by Niall Quinn.
Euro 2004, Portugal	Group 10: 5 teams, 1 qualifies, 2nd gets a playoff	3rd, 11pts/24	Switzerland 1–2, 0–2; Russia 1–1, 2–4; Albania 2–1, 0–0; Georgia 2–0, 2–1	
World Cup Germany 2006	Group 4: 6 teams, 1 qualifies Two 2nd place teams qualify Six 2nd place teams have a playoff	4th, 17pts/30	France 0–1, 0–0; Switzerland 0–0, 1–1; Israel 2–2, 1–1; Cyprus 3–0, 1–0; Faroe Islands 2–0, 2–0	Apart from the Republic of Ireland's loss to France, the top 4 teams drew all matches against each other, and won against the other two.
Euro 2008, Switzerland & Austria	Group D: 7 teams, 2 qualify	3rd, 17pts/36	Czech Republic 1–1, 0–1; Germany 0–0, 0–1; Slovakia 1–0, 2–2; Wales 1–0, 2–2; Cyprus 1–1, 2–5; San Marino 5–0, 2–1	After losing to Cyprus, the Republic of Ireland fell below Northern Ireland in the FIFA World Rankings for the first time since they began in 1992. Robbie Keane scored a hat-trick against San Marino, in the last soccer international played at Lansdowne Road prior to redevelopment. The first qualifying campaign since the 1986 World Cup where the Republic of Ireland were eliminated before their last game.
World Cup South Africa 2010	Group 8: 6 teams, 1 qualifies Eight of nine runners-up get a playoff	2nd, 18pts/30 Ranked 8th of 9 runners-up Lost playoff	Italy 2–2, 1–1; Bulgaria 1–1, 1–1; Cyprus 1–0, 2–1; Montenegro 0–0, 0–0; Georgia 2–1, 2–1; Playoff: France 0–1, 1–1 (away leg went to extra time)	This was Montenegro's first major tournament. The Georgia away tie was played at a neutral venue in Mainz, Germany due to the 2008 South Ossetia war. France's Thierry Henry's handball stirred international controversy after the move set up William Gallas to score in extra-time of the second leg of the playoff; the referee did not notice and allowed the goal to stand, leading to widespread media controversy, protests at the French embassy in Dublin and comments from senior government officials from both countries.
Euro 2012, Poland & Ukraine	Group B: 6 teams, 1 qualifies Best runner-up qualifies The other 8 runners-up get a playoff	2nd, 21pts/30 Won playoff QUALIFIED	Russia 2–3, 0–0; Slovakia 0–0, 1–1; Macedonia 2–1, 2–0; Armenia 2–1, 1–0; Andorra 3–1, 2–0; Playoff: Estonia 1–1, 4–0	The first games at the new Aviva Stadium. Ireland held off the challenge of a free-scoring Armenia side. A favourable play-off draw set up a tie against an inexperienced and unfancied Estonia.
World Cup Brazil 2014	Group C: 6 teams, 1 qualifies Eight of nine runners-up get a playoff	4th, 14pts/30	Germany 1–6, 0–3; Sweden 1–2, 0–0; Austria 2–2, 0–1; Kazakhstan 3–1, 2–1; Faroe Islands 3–0, 4–1	
Euro 2016, France	Group D: 6 teams, 2 qualify Best third-placed team qualifies The other 8 third-placed teams get a playoff	3rd, 18pts/30 Ranked 7th of 9 third-placed teams Won playoff QUALIFIED	Germany 1–0, 1–1; Poland 1–1, 1–2; Scotland 1–1, 0–1; Georgia 1–0, 2–1; Gibraltar 7–0, 4–0; Playoff: Bosnia and Herzegovina 2–0, 1–1	
World Cup Russia 2018	Group D: 6 teams, 1 qualifies Eight of nine runners-up get a playoff	2nd, 19pts/30 Ranked 8th of 9 runners-up Lost playoff	Serbia 0–1, 2–2; Wales 0–0, 1–0; Austria 1–1, 1–0; Georgia 1–0, 1–1; Moldova 2–0, 3–1; Playoff: Denmark 1–5, 0–0	
2018–19 UEFA Nations League	League B, Group 4: 3 teams, 1 promoted	3rd, 2pts/12 Overall: 23rd of 55	Denmark 0–0, 0–0; Wales 0–1, 1–4	First UEFA Nations League
Euro 2020	Group D: 5 teams, 2 qualify Playoff places via 2018–19 UEFA Nations League; Playoffs are single games, must win twice	3rd, 13pts/24 Lost playoff semi-final	Switzerland 1–1, 0–2; Denmark 1–1, 0–0; Georgia 1–0, 0–0; Gibraltar 2–0, 1–0; P/O Semi-Final: Slovakia 0–0 a.e.t. (a) (Slovakia won on penalties)	Qualification suspended due to the COVID-19 pandemic. Tournament was moved to 2021 for the same reason.
2020–21 UEFA Nations League	League B4: 4 teams, 1 promoted 1 relegated	3rd, 3pts/18 Overall: 28th of 55	Finland 0–1, 0–1; Wales 0–0, 0–1; Bulgaria 0–0, 1–1	Republic of Ireland would have been in League C, but a format change restored them to League B.
World Cup Qatar 2022	Group A: 5 teams, 1 qualifies Runner-up enters playoffs Additional playoff places via 2020–21 UEFA Nations League	3rd, 9pts/24	Serbia 1–1, 2–3; Portugal 0–0, 1–2; Luxembourg 0–1, 3–0; Azerbaijan 1–1, 3–0	A home defeat to Luxembourg is considered one of the Republic of Ireland's worst defeats. Also failed to reach double figures in points for the first time since Euro 92.
2022–23 UEFA Nations League	League B1: 4 teams, 1 promoted 1 relegated	3rd, 7pts/18 Overall: 26th of 55	Scotland 3–0, 1–2; Ukraine 0–1, 1–1; Armenia 3–2, 0–1	Away game v. Ukraine was played at a neutral venue in Łódź, Poland due to the 2022 Russian invasion of Ukraine.
Euro 2024, Germany	Group B: 5 teams, 2 qualify Additional qualifying places via 2022–23 UEFA Nations League	4th, 6pts/24	France 0–1, 0–2; Netherlands 1–2, 0–1; Greece 0–2, 1–2; Gibraltar 3–0, 4–0	Averaging just 0.75 points per game, the Republic of Ireland's worst performance since the Euro 1972 qualifiers.
2024–25 UEFA Nations League	League B2: 4 teams, 1 promoted 1 goes to promotion playoff 1 goes to relegation playoff 1 relegated	3rd, 6pts/18 Won relegation playoff Overall: 27th of 54	England 0–2, 0–5; Greece 0–2, 0–2; Finland 1–0, 2–1; Relegation playoff: Bulgaria 2–1, 2–1	
World Cup Canada–Mexico–United States 2026	Group F: 4 teams, 1 qualifies 1 goes to playoff Additional playoff places via 2024–25 UEFA Nations League	2nd, 10pts/18 Lost playoff semi-final	Portugal 2–0, 0–1; Hungary 2–2, 3–2; Armenia 1–0, 1–2; P/O semi-final: Czech Republic 2–2 a.e.t. (a) (Czechia won on penalties)	
2026–27 UEFA Nations League	League B3: 4 teams, 1 promoted 1 goes to promotion playoff 1 goes to relegation playoff	2nd, 8pts/18 Reached promotion playoff	Austria 2–2, 0–1; Kosovo 3–0, 0–1; Israel 1–1, 3–0; Promotion playoff: Croatia tbp, tbp	First games against Kosovo. The prospect of playing Israel was very controversial in Ireland, due to the Gaza war, Iran war and Lebanon war, and the killing of many footballers in the invasion, many calling for the games to be boycotted. In 2025, the FAI voted in favour of suspending the Israel Football Association from club and international competitions. Both games were played at neutral venues, the away game in Debrecen, Hungary and the Irish home game in Bačka Topola, Serbia. The promotion playoff is a two-legged tie in March 2027. The first leg will be played at home.
Euro 2028, UK / Ireland	Group of 4 or 5 teams Group winners qualify Best 8 of 12 runners-up also qualify 2 qualifier places held in reserve for host nations	Group draw on 6 December 2026		All four host teams (England, Republic of Ireland, Scotland and Wales) enter qualifying, with two automatic spots held in reserve for hosts which fail to qualify. Should three or more host teams fail to qualify, the spots would be awarded to the best-performing hosts.
2028–29 UEFA Nations League	League A, B or C Group of 6 teams			A group of six teams. Ireland would play 6 games: 2 (home and way) against the team from their own seeding pot, and 4 (home or away) against the others.
World Cup Morocco–Portugal–Spain 2030				
UEFA Euro 2032, Italy–Turkey				
World Cup Saudi Arabia 2034				

== Finals tournaments ==
=== Summer Olympics 1924, Paris ===
Match	Date	Venue	Result	Irish Team	Notes
First; Round	May 28	Stade Olympique Yves-du-Manoir, Colombes	(Republic of Ireland) Irish Free State 1 Bulgaria 0 (Duncan 75')	Paddy O'Reilly, Bertie Kerr, Jack McCarthy, Ernie MacKay, Jimmy Dykes, Tommy Muldoon, Michael Farrell, Joe Kendrick, Snr., Paddy Duncan, Dinny Hannon, John Murray	
Quarter-final	June 2	Stade de Paris, Saint-Ouen-sur-Seine	Netherlands 2 (Republic of Ireland) Irish Free State 1 (a.e.t.) (Formenoy 7' 104'; Ghent 33')	Paddy O'Reilly, Bertie Kerr, Jack McCarthy, Ernie MacKay, Jimmy Dykes, Tommy Muldoon, Michael Farrell, Frank Ghent, Paddy Duncan, Dinny Hannon, John Murray	

=== Summer Olympics 1948, London ===
Match	Date	Venue	Result	Irish Team	Notes
Preliminary; Round	July 26	Fratton Park, Portsmouth	(Republic of Ireland) Ireland 1 Netherlands 3 (O'Kelly 52'; Wilkes 1' 74', Roosenburg 11')	William Barry, Desmond Cleary, Frank Glennon, Patrick Kavanagh, Denis Lawler, Peter McDonald, Emmet McLoughlin, William O'Grady, Brendan O'Kelly, Billy Richardson, Bobby Smith	

=== Euro 1988 ===
Match	Date	Venue	Result	Irish Team	Notes
Group; Game; 1	June 12	Neckarstadion, Stuttgart	England 0 Republic of Ireland 1 (Houghton 6') Report	Pat Bonner; Chris Morris, Chris Hughton, Mick McCarthy, Kevin Moran; Ray Houghton, Ronnie Whelan, Paul McGrath, Tony Galvin (sub Kevin Sheedy 76'); Frank Stapleton (c.) (sub Niall Quinn 63'), John Aldridge.	Houghton's goal was a rare header. The team spent most of the rest of the game defending the lead.
Group; Game; 2	June 15	Niedersachsenstadion, Hannover	Republic of Ireland 1 (Whelan 38')Soviet Union 1 (Protasov 74') Report	Pat Bonner; Chris Morris, Chris Hughton, Mick McCarthy, Kevin Moran; Ray Houghton, Ronnie Whelan, Tony Galvin, Kevin Sheedy; Frank Stapleton (c.) (Tony Cascarino 80'), John Aldridge.	Whelan's goal was a spectacular overhead volley from a McCarthy throw-in. Protasov nutmegged Bonner for the equaliser.
Group; Game; 3	June 18	Parkstadion, Gelsenkirchen	Republic of Ireland 0 Netherlands 1 (Kieft 82') Report	Pat Bonner; Chris Morris (Kevin Sheedy 45'), Chris Hughton, Mick McCarthy, Kevin Moran; Ray Houghton, Ronnie Whelan, Paul McGrath, Tony Galvin; Frank Stapleton (c.) (Tony Cascarino 82'), John Aldridge.	Substitute Kieft's header was going well wide but bounced with severe spin into the net.

=== World Cup Italia 90 ===
Match	Date	Venue	Result	Irish Team	Notes
Group; Game; 1	June 11	Stadio Sant'Elia, Cagliari	England 1 (Lineker 8'); Republic of Ireland 1 (Sheedy 73') Report	Pat Bonner; Chris Morris, Steve Staunton, Mick McCarthy (c.), Kevin Moran; Paul McGrath, Ray Houghton, Kevin Sheedy, Andy Townsend; John Aldridge (Alan McLoughlin 64'), Tony Cascarino.	Nine of the players who represented the Republic of Ireland in this game were born in the United Kingdom.
Group; Game; 2	June 17	Stadio Della Favorita, Palermo	Republic of Ireland 0 Egypt 0 Report	Pat Bonner; Chris Morris, Steve Staunton, Mick McCarthy (c.), Kevin Moran; Paul McGrath, Ray Houghton, Kevin Sheedy (Tony Cascarino 62'), Andy Townsend; Niall Quinn, John Aldridge (Ronnie Whelan 62').	First time Ireland played a CAF team competitively.
Group; Game; 3	June 21	Stadio Della Favorita, Palermo	Netherlands 1 (Gullit 10'); Republic of Ireland 1 (Quinn 71') Report	Pat Bonner; Chris Morris, Steve Staunton, Mick McCarthy (c.), Kevin Moran; Paul McGrath, Ray Houghton, Kevin Sheedy, Andy Townsend;John Aldridge (Alan McLoughlin 64'), Tony Cascarino (Niall Quinn 84').	With both teams drawing their three group matches and also scoring and conceding the same number of goals, lots were drawn to determine who would finish second in the group behind England. The process favoured Ireland and it meant that they were to face Romania in the last 16, while the Netherlands would face the eventual winners, West Germany.
Second; Round	June 25	Stadio Luigi Ferraris, Genoa	Republic of Ireland 0 Romania 0 aet, 5–4 penalties Report	Pat Bonner; Chris Morris, Steve Staunton (David O'Leary 94'), Mick McCarthy (c.), Kevin Moran; Paul McGrath, Ray Houghton, Kevin Sheedy, Andy Townsend; John Aldridge (Tony Cascarino 22'), Niall Quinn.	Ireland's first penalty shoot-out. Bonner's save from Daniel Timofte in the shootout sent the Irish team through to the quarter-final.
Quarter; Final	June 30	Stadio Olimpico, Rome	Italy 1 (Schillaci 38'); Republic of Ireland 0 Report	Pat Bonner; Chris Morris, Steve Staunton, Mick McCarthy (c.), Kevin Moran; Paul McGrath, Ray Houghton, Kevin Sheedy, Andy Townsend; John Aldridge (John Sheridan 78'), Niall Quinn (Tony Cascarino 53').	

=== World Cup USA 94 ===
Match	Date	Venue	Result	Irish Team	Notes
Group; Game; 1	June 18	Giants Stadium, East Rutherford	Italy 0 Republic of Ireland 1 (Houghton 11') Report 1 Report 2 Report 3	Pat Bonner; Denis Irwin, Terry Phelan, Phil Babb, Paul McGrath; Roy Keane, Andy Townsend (c.), Ray Houghton (Jason McAteer 68'), John Sheridan, Steve Staunton; Tommy Coyne (John Aldridge 80')	This 1–0 win was Ireland's first victory in a World Cup Finals match. The match was won by Houghton's early strike, which dipped over the keeper into the net.
Group; Game; 2	June 23	Citrus Bowl, Orlando	Mexico 2 (Luis García 42' 65'); Republic of Ireland 1 (Aldridge 84') Report 1 Report 2	Pat Bonner; Denis Irwin, Terry Phelan, Phil Babb, Paul McGrath; Roy Keane, Andy Townsend (c.), Ray Houghton, John Sheridan, Steve Staunton (Jason McAteer 66'); Tommy Coyne (John Aldridge 67')	Ireland's first competitive game against a CONCACAF team. This game featured the infamous incident about the officials not allowing John Aldridge to go on as a substitute. Aldridge lost his cool before ultimately coming on and scoring with a header after cross from Jason McAteer, and Jack Charlton was fined and suspended from the dugout in Ireland's final group match with Norway.
Group; Game; 3	June 28	Giants Stadium, East Rutherford	Republic of Ireland 0 Norway 0 Report 1 Report 2	Pat Bonner; Gary Kelly, Steve Staunton, Phil Babb, Paul McGrath; Jason McAteer, Roy Keane, Andy Townsend (c.) (Ronnie Whelan 75'), John Sheridan, Ray Houghton; John Aldridge (David Kelly 65').	
Second; Round	July 4	Citrus Bowl, Orlando	Netherlands 2 (Bergkamp 11', Jonk 41'); Republic of Ireland 0 Report 1 Report 2	Pat Bonner; Gary Kelly, Terry Phelan, Phil Babb, Paul McGrath; Roy Keane, Andy Townsend (c.), Ray Houghton, John Sheridan, Steve Staunton (Jason McAteer 63'); John Aldridge, Tommy Coyne (Tony Cascarino 74').	

=== World Cup Korea-Japan 2002 ===
Match	Date	Venue	Result	Irish Team	Notes
Group; Game; 1	June 1	Niigata Stadium Big Swan, Niigata, Japan	Cameroon 1 (Mboma 39'); Republic of Ireland 1 (Holland 52') Report	Shay Given; Gary Kelly, Ian Harte (Steven Reid 77'), Gary Breen, Steve Staunton (c.); Jason McAteer (Steve Finnan 45'), Matt Holland, Mark Kinsella, Kevin Kilbane, Damien Duff; Robbie Keane.	
Group; Game; 2	June 5	Kashima Soccer Stadium, Kashima, Japan	Germany 1 (Klose 19'); Republic of Ireland 1 (Keane 90'); Report	Shay Given; Steve Finnan, Ian Harte (Steven Reid 73'), Gary Breen, Steve Staunton (c.) (Kenny Cunningham 87'); Gary Kelly (Niall Quinn 73'), Matt Holland, Kevin Kilbane, Mark Kinsella, Damien Duff; Robbie Keane.	The Republic's first ever competitive match against a German side.
Group; Game; 3	June 11	International Stadium, Yokohama, Japan	Republic of Ireland 3 (Keane 7', Breen 61', Duff 87'); Saudi Arabia 0 Report	Shay Given; Steve Finnan, Ian Harte (Niall Quinn 45'), Gary Breen, Steve Staunton (c.); Gary Kelly (Jason McAteer 80'), Matt Holland, Mark Kinsella (Lee Carsley 89'), Kevin Kilbane, Damien Duff; Robbie Keane.	This was the first time an Irish player had scored more than one goal in total in the World Cup Finals. Robbie Keane eventually went on to score three goals in the competition. Also the first time Ireland scored more than once in a match at a major tournament.
Second; Round	June 16	Big Bird Stadium, Suwon, South Korea	Spain 1 (Morientes 8'); Republic of Ireland 1 (Keane 90' pen) aet, lost 3–2 penalties Report	Shay Given; Steve Finnan, Ian Harte (David Connolly 82'), Gary Breen, Steve Staunton (c.) (Kenny Cunningham 50'); Gary Kelly (Niall Quinn 55'), Matt Holland, Mark Kinsella, Kevin Kilbane, Damien Duff; Robbie Keane.	First time Ireland lost a penalty shoot-out

=== Euro 2012 ===
Match	Date	Venue	Result	Irish Team	Notes
Group; Game; 1	June 10	Stadion Miejski, Poznań, Poland	Republic of Ireland 1 (St Ledger 19') Croatia 3 (Mandžukić 3' 49', Jelavić 43') Report	Shay Given; John O'Shea, Sean St. Ledger, Richard Dunne, Stephen Ward; Damien Duff, Keith Andrews, Glenn Whelan, Aiden McGeady (Simon Cox 53'); Robbie Keane (c.) (Shane Long 75'), Kevin Doyle (Jonathan Walters 54')	First time Ireland lost the opening match of a major tournament. First time Ireland conceded three goals at a major tournament. First time Ireland lost by more than one goal at a UEFA European Championship.
Group; Game; 2	June 14	PGE Arena, Gdańsk, Poland	Spain 4 (Torres 4', 70', Silva 49', Fabregas 83') vs. Republic of Ireland 0 Report	Shay Given; John O'Shea, Sean St. Ledger, Richard Dunne, Stephen Ward; Damien Duff (James McClean 76'), Keith Andrews, Glenn Whelan (Paul Green 80'), Aiden McGeady; Simon Cox (Jonathan Walters 46'), Robbie Keane (c.).	First time Ireland lost two successive games at a major tournament. First time Ireland conceded four goals at a major tournament. First time eliminated before final group match.
Group; Game; 3	June 18	Stadion Miejski, Poznań, Poland	Italy 2 (Cassano 35', Balotelli 90') vs. Republic of Ireland 0 Report	Shay Given; John O'Shea, Sean St. Ledger, Richard Dunne, Stephen Ward; Damien Duff (c.), Keith Andrews, Glenn Whelan, Aiden McGeady (Shane Long 65'); Robbie Keane (Simon Cox 86'), Kevin Doyle (Jonathan Walters 76')	First time Ireland lost three consecutive games at a major tournament. Keith Andrews became the first Irish player to be sent off at a major tournament.

=== Euro 2016 ===
Match	Date	Venue	Result	Irish Team	Notes
Group; Game; 1	June 13	Stade de France, Saint-Denis, France	Republic of Ireland 1 (Hoolahan 48') Sweden 1 (Clark (o.g.) 71') Report	Darren Randolph; Séamus Coleman, John O'Shea (c.), Ciaran Clark, Robbie Brady; James McCarthy (Aiden McGeady 85'), Glenn Whelan, Jeff Hendrick, Wes Hoolahan (Robbie Keane 78'); Jonathan Walters (James McClean 64'), Shane Long	First time Ireland drew their opening European Championship Finals game
Group; Game; 2	June 18	Nouveau Stade de Bordeaux, Bordeaux, France	Belgium 3 (R. Lukaku 48', 70', Witsel 61') vs. Republic of Ireland 0 Report	Darren Randolph; Séamus Coleman, John O'Shea (c.), Ciaran Clark, Stephen Ward; Jeff Hendrick, Glenn Whelan, James McCarthy (James McClean 62'), Robbie Brady; Wes Hoolahan (Aiden McGeady 71'); Shane Long (Robbie Keane 79')	
Group; Game; 3	June 22	Stade Pierre-Mauroy, Villeneuve-d'Ascq, France	Italy 0 vs. Republic of Ireland 1 (Brady 85') Report	Darren Randolph; Séamus Coleman (c.), Shane Duffy, Richard Keogh, Stephen Ward; Jeff Hendrick, James McCarthy (Wes Hoolahan 77'), Robbie Brady; Daryl Murphy (Aiden McGeady 70'), Shane Long (Stephen Quinn 90')	
Round of 16	June 26	Parc Olympique Lyonnais, Lyon, France	France 2 (Griezmann 58', 61') vs. Republic of Ireland 1 (Brady 2' (p.)) Report	Darren Randolph; Séamus Coleman (c.), Richard Keogh, Shane Duffy, Stephen Ward; Robbie Brady, James McCarthy (Wes Hoolahan 71'), Jeff Hendrick, James McClean (John O'Shea 68'); Shane Long, Daryl Murphy (Jonathan Walters 65')	First Irish knockout stage appearance at the Euros and first time an Irish player scored more than once in the Euros in a single competition.

== See also ==
- Republic of Ireland at the FIFA World Cup
- Republic of Ireland at the UEFA European Championship
