= Eugene Davis (footballer) =

Irish footballer (1953–2024)

Personal information
- Date of birth: 17 October 1953
- Place of birth: Dublin, Ireland
- Date of death: 15 June 2024 (aged 70)
- Place of death: Dublin, Ireland
- Position: Attacking midfielder

Youth career
- 1965–1972: St Joseph's

Senior career*
Years	Team	Apps	(Gls)
1972–1974	Shamrock Rovers		
1974–1982	Athlone Town		
1982–1985	St Patrick's Athletic		
1985	UCD		
1985–1986	Bohemians	20	(8)
1986–1989	Bray Wanderers	44	(13)
Total			(130)

International career
1971–1972	Republic of Ireland U19		
- * Club domestic league appearances and goals

Eugene "Pooch" Davis (17 October 1953 – 15 June 2024) was an Irish footballer who played for several clubs, most notably Athlone Town with whom he won the League of Ireland title in 1981.

== Career ==
Davis began his football career with local side St Joseph's in Sallynoggin, lining out from under-12 up to the club's youth team. He was signed for League of Ireland side Shamrock Rovers under Liam Tuohy in 1972. He scored his first goal for The Hoops in the League of Ireland Shield but a wage dispute over bonuses for the League of Ireland Cup in August 1974 resulted in Davis joining Athlone Town after being released by Rovers.

He was a regular scorer for Athlone over the following six seasons, hitting a total of 49 league goals between 1974 and 1980. Davis was the league's top scorer with 23 goals during Athlone's League of Ireland-winning 1980–81 season. He scored twice against Vålerenga Fotball in the 1975–76 UEFA Cup to advance to play AC Milan

Davis moved to St Patrick's Athletic in 1982, scoring 13 league goals in his debut season. A three-month with UCD was followed by an 18-month tenure with Bohemians, where he scored 8 goals in 20 league appearances. Davis brought his career to an end with Bray Wanderers in 1989 scoring 19 goals in 66 total appearances.

Davis scored a total of 130 League of Ireland goals

== International career ==
A teammate of Liam Brady Davis' goals against Iceland helped Ireland qualify for the 1972 UEFA European Under-18 Championship, where they played England, Yugoslavia and Belgium

== Death ==
Davis died on 15 June 2024, at the age of 70.

== Honours ==
Athlone Town

- League of Ireland: 1980–81
- League of Ireland Cup: 1979–80, 1981–82
- Tyler Cup: 1979–80
