= Dinny Hannon =

Irish footballer

Personal information
- Date of birth: 31 January 1888
- Place of birth: Athlone, County Westmeath, Ireland
- Date of death: 23 August 1971 (aged 83)
- Position: Inside right

Senior career*
Years	Team	Apps	(Gls)
- Bohemians
- Athlone Town

International career
1908–1913	Ireland (IFA)	6	(1)
1907–1919	Ireland Amateurs (IFA)		
1924	Irish Free State	2	(0)
- * Club domestic league appearances and goals

Denis J. Hannon, also known as Dinny Hannon or Dinney Hannon (31 January 1888 – 23 August 1971), was an Irish footballer who played as an inside-right for both Bohemians and Athlone Town. Born in Athlone, County Westmeath, Ireland, Hannon was also a dual international and played for both Ireland teams – the IFA XI and the FAI XI. He was the first player ever to do this. In 1913 he was a member of the first ever IFA XI to beat England and in 1924 he represented the Irish Free State at the Paris Olympics.

== Club career ==
=== Bohemians ===
Hannon helped Bohemians reach three Irish Cup finals in 1908, 1909 and 1911. They won the competition in 1908, beating Shelbourne 3–1 in a replay after initially drawing 1-1.

=== Athlone Town ===
In 1924 Hannon helped Athlone Town win the FAI Cup, beating Bohemians and Shelbourne in early rounds, before scoring the winner as they defeated Fordsons in the final. Together with Tommy Muldoon, Frank Ghent, Paddy Reilly and John Joe Dykes, Hannon was one of five Athlone Town players subsequently included in the Irish Free State squad for the 1924 Olympic Games.

== Irish international ==
When Hannon began his international career in 1908, Ireland was represented by a single team, selected by the Belfast-based Irish Football Association. However, during the 1920s, Ireland was partitioned into Northern Ireland and the Irish Free State. Amid these political upheavals, a rival association, the Football Association of Ireland, emerged in Dublin and from 1924 organised their own national team. As a result, several notable Irish players from this era, including Hannon played for both teams – the IFA XI and also the FAI XI.

=== IFA XI ===
Between 1908 and 1913, while playing for Bohemians, Hannon then made 6 appearances and scored 1 goal for the IFA XI. He made his international debut on 15 February 1908 in a 3–1 defeat against England at the Solitude Ground. Hannon soon scored on his debut, but this would prove to be his first and last goal at international level. He made his second appearance against Scotland on 14 March 1908 in a 5–0 defeat at Dalymount Park. He went on to make three appearances against England, two against Scotland and one against Wales. He made his last appearance for the IFA XI on 15 February 1913 in a 2–1 win against England at Windsor Park. This was the first time they ever had beat England. While playing for the IFA XI, Hannon's teammates included Billy Scott, Val Harris, Bill Lacey and Billy Gillespie.

=== Irish Free State ===
In 1924 Hannon had made 2 appearances for the Irish Free State. Together with Paddy Duncan, Tommy Muldoon and Joe Kendrick he had competed in the Paris Olympics. He made his debut for the Irish Free State against Bulgaria in their first ever senior international on 28 May 1924. As a result of winning this game they qualified for the quarter-finals of the competition. Hannon also played in this game on 2 June, a 2-1 extra-time defeat against the Netherlands. Hannon, aged 36, was a veteran during this era of his career and was one of the oldest players ever to play Olympic football. Hannon captained Ireland in both games and although amateur internationals, Olympic Games matches in Paris are recognised by FIFA as full internationals.

== Honours ==
Bohemians

- Irish Cup
  - Winners 1908: 1
  - Runners Up 1909, 1911: 2

Athlone Town

- FAI Cup
  - Winners 1924: 1
