= 1980–81 Tyler Cup =

Tournament details
- Country: Northern Ireland; Republic of Ireland
- Teams: 16

Final positions
- Champions: Linfield (1st title)
- Runners-up: Athlone Town

Tournament statistics
- Matches played: 16
- Goals scored: 60 (3.75 per match)

The 1980–81 Tyler Cup was the 3rd and final edition of the Tyler Cup, an association football cup competition featuring teams from Northern Ireland and the Republic of Ireland.

Linfield won the title, defeating Athlone Town 2–1 in the two-legged final.

== Results ==
=== First round ===
| Team 1 | Score | Team 2 |
|---|---|---|
| Athlone Town | 5–4 | Coleraine |
| Ballymena United | 0–2 | Shamrock Rovers |
| Cliftonville | 3–2 | Bohemians |
| Drogheda United | 4–2 | Distillery |
| Dundalk | 0–1 | Crusaders |
| Glentoran | 1–3 | Sligo Rovers |
| Limerick | 2–3 | Portadown |
| Linfield | 2–1 | Finn Harps |

=== Quarter-finals ===
| Team 1 | Score | Team 2 |
|---|---|---|
| Athlone Town | 4–3 | Cliftonville |
| Crusaders | 5–0 | Drogheda United |
| Portadown | 0–1 | Shamrock Rovers |
| Sligo Rovers | 1–2 | Linfield |

=== Semi-finals ===
| Team 1 | Score | Team 2 |
|---|---|---|
| Linfield | 3–1 | Crusaders |
| Shamrock Rovers | 0–2 | Athlone Town |

=== Final ===
9 August 1980

| Linfield | 0–0 | Athlone Town |
|---|---|---|
| | Report |

Windsor Park, Belfast
Attendance: 6,000
Referee: P. Mulhall (Dublin)

13 August 1980

| Athlone Town | 1–2 | Linfield |
|---|---|---|
| Davis 84' | Report | McCurdy 20', 28' |

St Mel's Park, Athlone
Attendance: 2,000
Referee: Oliver Donnelly (Newtownabbey)

Linfield win 2–1 on aggregate.
