= Tommy Muldoon =

Irish footballer

Personal information
- Date of birth: 27 July 1897
- Place of birth: Athlone, County Westmeath, Ireland
- Date of death: 12 October 1989 (aged 92)
- Place of death: Birmingham, England
- Positions: Midfielder; defender

Senior career*
Years	Team	Apps	(Gls)
1919–1924	Athlone Town		
1924–1927	Aston Villa		
1927–1929	Tottenham Hotspur	0	(0)
1929–1931	Walsall		

International career
1924–1927	Irish Free State	5	(0)
- * Club domestic league appearances and goals

Thomas A. Muldoon (27 July 1897 – 12 October 1989) was an Irish footballer who played for, among others, Athlone Town and Aston Villa. As an international he also played for the Irish Free State and represented them at the 1924 Olympic Games.

== Early years ==
Muldoon initially attended Deer Park National School in Athlone before completing his education, between 1912 and 1914, at St. Mary's Intermediate School. During the First World War he joined the Prince of Wales's Leinster Regiment and subsequently served in British India.

== Club career ==
After the War, Muldoon began playing football for Athlone Town. In 1924 he helped them win the FAI Cup, beating Bohemians and Shelbourne in early rounds, before defeating Fordsons in final.

Together with Dinny Hannon, Frank Ghent, Paddy Reilly and John Joe Dykes, Muldoon was one of five Athlone Town players subsequently included in the Irish Free State squad for the 1924 Olympic Games.

In October 1924 Muldoon signed for Aston Villa and went on to make 34 first team appearances during his three-year stay. He travelled to Sweden with Villa on their first foreign tour in May. Örgryte celebrated a major success when beating Aston Villa 5–2 and Villa also lost to Gothenburg-combined (Kombinerol Gotesburgslag). Villa won 11 - 2 over the select Oslo-combined Lyn og Frig including FK Lyn & Frigg Oslo players. Capewell scored four, Walker a hat-trick, Arthur Dorrell a brace, and Muldoon scored the goal of the game.

In September 1927 he moved to Tottenham Hotspur but failed to make the first XI. In July 1929 he returned to the Midlands where he played over 50 league games for Walsall.

== Irish international ==
Between 1924 and 1927 Muldoon made 5 appearances for the Irish Free State. As a member of the squad that competed at the 1924 Olympic Games, he made his debut for the Free State against Bulgaria in their first ever senior international on 28 May.

At the same tournament he also played against the Netherlands on 2 June. Then on the following day, Muldoon played against Estonia in a friendly. On 14 June 1924 he played in another friendly against the United States in a 3–1 win at Dalymount Park. His last international appearance was in the 2–1 defeat to Italy B on 23 April 1927. Together with Mick O'Brien, Harry Duggan and Joe Kendrick, he became one of the first four English League based players to play for the Irish Free State. . Muldoon was injured during the game and finished it as a limping passenger.

== Honours ==
Athlone Town

- FAI Cup
  - Winners 1924: 1
