= Brian Statham =

English cricketer (1930–2000)

Personal information
- Full name: John Brian Statham
- Born: 17 June 1930; Gorton, Manchester, Lancashire, England
- Died: 10 June 2000 (aged 69); Cheadle, Greater Manchester, England
- Batting: Left-handed
- Bowling: Right arm fast
- Role: Bowler

International information
- National side: England
- Test debut (cap 356): 17 March 1951 v New Zealand
- Last Test: 31 August 1965 v South Africa

Domestic team information
- Years: Team
- 1950–1968: Lancashire

Career statistics
Competition	Test	FC	LA
Matches	70	559	15
Runs scored	675	5,424	72
Batting average	11.44	10.80	14.40
100s/50s	0/0	0/5	0/0
Top score	38	62	36
Balls bowled	16,056	100,955	991
Wickets	252	2,260	22
Bowling average	24.84	16.37	21.09
5 wickets in innings	9	123	1
10 wickets in match	1	11	0
Best bowling	7/39	8/34	5/28
Catches/stumpings	28/0	230/0	4/0
- Source: CricInfo, 21 September 2018

John Brian Statham, CBE (17 June 1930 – 10 June 2000) was an English professional cricketer from Gorton, in Manchester, who played for Lancashire County Cricket Club from 1950 to 1968 and for England from 1951 to 1965. As an England player, he took part in nine overseas tours from 1950–51 to 1962–63. He was a right arm fast bowler and was noted for the consistent accuracy of his length and direction.

Statham is perhaps best remembered for the fast bowling partnerships he formed at international level with, first, Frank Tyson and then, more famously, with Fred Trueman. Unlike the latter, Statham did not make the ball swing in flight but, by pitching it on the seam, he could achieve very fast deviation off the pitch which accounted for many a batsman's wicket. In 1963, he briefly held the world record for the most wickets taken in Test cricket and, having been overtaken by Trueman, he ended his international career with 252. His first-class career tally of 2,260 wickets is nineteenth in the all-time list and he has the best (lowest) average of all the top twenty bowlers. His total of 1,816 wickets taken in first-class matches for Lancashire is the club record.

A natural athlete, Statham was an outstanding fielder who operated in deep positions, usually on the boundary where his running speed and the accuracy of his throwing were great assets. He batted left-handed, invariably as a tailender, and was occasionally effective when stubborn resistance was required. He captained Lancashire for three seasons from 1965 to 1967. He became a member of Lancashire's committee from 1970 to 1995 and was elected club president in 1997 and 1998. After his death in 2000, part of Warwick Road alongside Lancashire's Old Trafford Cricket Ground was renamed Brian Statham Way in his honour and the south end of Old Trafford is called the Brian Statham End.

== Early years (1930 to 1951) ==
Brian Statham was born on Tuesday, 17 June 1930 in his parents' home at 1, Chatham Road, Gorton, Manchester. They were John James Arnold Statham (1889–1962), a dental surgeon, and his wife, Florence, née Beevers (1889–1955). He was the youngest of four brothers. Brian was educated at Aspinal Primary School on Broadacre Road in Gorton and, through the years of the Second World War, Manchester Central Grammar School. He played for the school at both cricket and football but only played the latter outside school. He became disillusioned with cricket and developed a preference for tennis as a summer sport.

Statham left school in 1946, aged sixteen, and went to work as a clerk for an accountancy firm. He was playing football for Denton West F.C. as a left winger. He was offered trials by both Liverpool and Manchester City but these were vetoed by his father who was opposed to any of his sons pursuing a career in football. Statham's football team was managed by Eric Taylor who was also involved with Reddish & Gorton Cricket Club (R&G). In the spring of 1947, wanting to keep his players together through the summer, Taylor invited them to join the R&G and that revived Statham's interest in cricket. R&G were members of the Saddleworth & District League. In October 1947, after Statham's first season there, they renamed themselves Denton West Cricket Club in response to local boundary changes and joined the North Western League for the 1948 season. Statham continued to play for them in 1948.

=== National service ===
Statham turned eighteen in June 1948 and became eligible for national service. He received his call-up in October and served eighteen months in the RAF until 1 May 1950. He was based at RAF Stafford and did clerical work for one of the aircraft maintenance units. He was able to travel home each weekend in the summer of 1948 to play for Denton West and he topped the North Western League's bowling averages for the season. He was invited to join Stockport Cricket Club in the Central Lancashire League but initially turned it down because he was happy at Denton West. He later recalled earning his first money from cricket when a crowd collection was done on his behalf after one match in which he took eight for 15.

He played for RAF Stafford's station team through the 1949 season and took a total of 96 wickets at an average of three. He recalled that the pitches were so lively that even a good length ball would rise above the stumps. Statham responded to this by adding the yorker to his repertoire and that accounted for a high percentage of his victims from then on. Despite his success, Statham did not play for the full Royal Air Force cricket team. Had he done so, he would have encountered Peter May and Frank Tyson who represented the Royal Navy and the British Army respectively that summer.

Statham decided to accept Stockport's invitation for 1949 and played for them six times, when he could obtain weekend leave. It was in the Central Lancashire League that, for the first time, he encountered professional players. Stockport shared the 1949 league title with Milnrow Cricket Club, both teams amassing 48 points. An RAF corporal called Larry Lazarus, the sports NCO at Stafford, recognised Statham's potential as a fast bowler who could bowl straight. Lazarus was a Londoner and he wrote to Marylebone Cricket Club (MCC) to ask if they had a ground staff vacancy which Statham could fill when his national service ended. MCC replied that Statham should first approach Lancashire as his native county club.

=== Joining Lancashire ===
Statham contacted the club and found that they had received a report about him from the Central Lancashire League. He was invited to take part in a two-day trial match in April 1950 and this was successful, especially as he dismissed two first team batsmen, Winston Place and Alan Wharton. Lancashire offered him professional terms to begin in May after his national service ended. A civilian again, Statham joined the Old Trafford ground staff. His parents had no objection to him pursuing a cricket career. He began his new career by playing in Club & Ground matches and was soon chosen for the Second XI, who were the reigning Minor Counties champions. He played in their first five matches, taking 26 wickets at 14 runs apiece.

One of Lancashire's biggest worries in 1950 was finding a successor to their veteran pace bowler Dick Pollard and Statham's arrival solved that problem. Pollard retired from first-class cricket at the end of the season. Although Statham had not yet had any real coaching, he soon impressed the Lancashire coach Harry Makepeace who, only two weeks later, ensured his selection for the first team in the match against Kent at Old Trafford.

It began on Saturday, 17 June, Statham's twentieth birthday. Lancashire scored 271 on the Saturday (Statham, batting eleven, was last man out without scoring) and they reduced Kent to 62 for four at the close with Statham having taken the wicket of Arthur Fagg, caught by Alan Wharton for four. Statham later recalled that it was fluke dismissal. His captain Cyril Washbrook told him to maintain a good length against Fagg who was strong against short-pitched bowling and played the hook shot exceptionally well. Statham started well enough, conceding only a couple of singles in his first two overs but he then mistimed a delivery which pitched short and Fagg went to hook it. Fagg was, however, surprised by Statham's pace and he mishit his shot, the ball going off the splice of the bat and being caught by Wharton at forward short leg. Statham said Washbrook liked his speed but not his length.

Play resumed on the Monday and Kent were soon all out for 101 (Statham one for 13), the follow on being enforced by Lancashire captain Nigel Howard. In their second innings, Kent were dismissed for 97 and Lancashire won the match by an innings and 73 runs. Statham bowled opener Dicky Mayes for a duck and took one for eight. It was a promising start for a raw youngster who, according to Wisden, arrived at the ground with his boots in a brown paper parcel. The Manchester Guardian said that the debutant maintained excellent pace off the pitch and generally bowls at the stumps.

Statham's bowling action received some criticism at first from so-called purists who claimed that he lacked rhythm. His action then has been described as a 17-pace run, plus a hop, skip and jump. Statham was a natural athlete, however. He was both loose-limbed and double-jointed so his action was never going to be classic (in contrast to his future England partner Fred Trueman, also making his way at that time, whose cartwheel action was the epitome of classic). Statham soon won friends among his teammates because of his easygoing, humorous beer-and-fags persona. As it happened, Lancashire hadn't had a player called George (the king's name) for many years and so Statham was nicknamed George in the dressing room to compensate for the absence.

=== 1950 season ===
Statham played a total of fifteen matches for Lancashire in 1950. One was against the touring West Indians and the rest were in the County Championship which ended with the title being shared by Lancashire and Surrey. Lancashire had last won the title in 1934 and would not win it again until 2011. Statham's fourth match, starting on Saturday, 1 July, was against Somerset at Bath and he began with a sensational spell, taking the first five wickets for only five runs and reducing Somerset to 11 for five. They were all out for 72 and Lancashire won the match by an innings and 60 runs.

Statham really made an impression when he encountered Yorkshire for the first time in the Roses Match which began at Old Trafford on Saturday, 5 August. A large crowd was present and Statham caused a stir when he lost his footing and fell over while running up to bowl the first ball. He responded by simply dusting himself down and starting again. After conceding a single to Len Hutton, he bowled Frank Lowson for a duck and went on to take five for 52 as Yorkshire scored 226 with a century by their captain Norman Yardley. The match was an even contest and ended in a draw after Lancashire had been set 276 to win on the final day and made 160 for three. Wisden said that Statham's first innings bowling bordered on the sensational. Statham ended the 1950 season with 37 wickets, a best return of five for 18 (against Somerset) and a good average (eighth among bowlers who took at least ten wickets) of 16.56. He had earned a regular first-team place and was awarded his county cap. Playfair described him as a most promising pace bowler who was able to move the ball either way with genuine pace off the pitch.

=== 1950–51 in Australia and New Zealand ===
Statham returned to his old job in accountancy for the winter, a generous act by his employer as he had been absent for nearly two years since leaving for national service and then going straight into county cricket. He had just about settled in again when he received a huge surprise just after the New Year. He and his Lancashire colleague Roy Tattersall were summoned as reinforcements for the injury-hit MCC team touring Australia and New Zealand.

They left behind a severely cold winter in Manchester and flew to a severely hot summer in Adelaide where Statham played his first overseas match against South Australia, starting on Saturday, 27 January 1951. Statham had never even met the majority of his new team-mates but he had encountered and impressed Len Hutton, and it is generally supposed that he was invited on Hutton's firm recommendation. He played against Victoria at the Melbourne Cricket Ground (MCG) in February and then went with the MCC team to New Zealand. After playing against Auckland and Otago, Statham made his Test match debut for England against New Zealand at Lancaster Park in Christchurch, the four-day match starting on Saturday, 17 March. Statham bowled first change after Alec Bedser and Trevor Bailey had shared the new ball. His first Test wicket was that of New Zealand opener Bert Sutcliffe, who had scored 116. It was a high-scoring match that ended in a draw.

== 1951 to 1954 ==
=== 1951 season ===
There were few Test opportunities for Statham from 1951 to 1953 but he continued to improve at county level. As he developed greater strength, he increased his pace from fast-medium to genuine fast. He took 97 wickets at the good low average of 15.11 in 1951 and played in two of the Tests against South Africa, taking four wickets in all. England won the series by three Tests to one, the bowling honours being shared by Alec Bedser and the spinners Jim Laker and Roy Tattersall.

Lancashire, with eight victories in their 28 matches, finished third but a long way behind winners Warwickshire. There was a key fixture for Lancashire at Old Trafford in May when they met their co-champions Surrey. Statham was outstanding in the match and began by dismissing both the opening batsmen, one of them clean bowled by a yorker, and took five for 33 as Surrey were all out for only 114. Surrey had to follow on and Statham again dismissed the openers cheaply en route to four for 29. Lancashire need just 39 to win. Soon afterwards, Statham made his first appearance at Lord's against Middlesex and his four for fourteen was instrumental in forcing another follow on, Lancashire again winning.

In the Test series, he was chosen for the second match at Lord's but had little to do as it was a spinner's wicket and his Lancashire colleague Roy Tattersall took twelve for 101, England winning to level the series one-all. He kept his place in the third Test at Old Trafford but, while his opening partner Bedser took twelve, he was only needed for a total of 24 overs. In the last two Tests, the selectors decided to pair first Trevor Bailey and then Derek Shackleton with Bedser, but Statham was content as he was certainly in the Test picture and his potential was recognised.

=== 1951–52 in India, Pakistan and Ceylon ===
Statham was selected by MCC for the winter tour of India, Pakistan and Ceylon from 5 October 1951 to 2 March 1952. He came back with mixed feelings. The tour was demanding, especially as he didn't take to foods like curry and rice, but he said he would always recommend the trip to other players, the experience to be gained being worth it.

The team played five Tests in India and two internationals against Pakistan (these were less than a year before Pakistan was granted Test status on 28 July 1952). Statham took a total of 48 wickets on the tour, including four returns in which he took four wickets. He played in all five Tests against India but took only eight wickets at the high average of 36.62 with a best performance of four for 96. The series was drawn with one win apiece and three draws. Wisden commented on the serious difficulties posed by ground conditions throughout the tour with lifeless pitches resulting in more than half the matches inevitably being drawn. Wisden had words of praise for Statham who, despite the unfavourable conditions, looked menacing at times and showed the potential to become a top-class bowler of genuine pace.

One of the few matches on the tour to provide a wicket with any life in it was the second international against Pakistan in Karachi. On the first day, both teams were dismissed for low scores with most of the wickets falling to pace or seam bowlers. Fazal Mahmood took six for 40 as MCC were bundled out for only 123; and then Statham with four for 32 and Derek Shackleton with four for 50 dismissed Pakistan for 130. Batting conditions improved on the second and third days. MCC totalled 291 in their second innings, Tom Graveney scoring 123, and set Pakistan a target of 285 which they achieved to win by four wickets.

Statham played against Ceylon in the final leg of the tour and MCC won this game comfortably by an innings and 33 runs. Statham took four for nine in the first innings as Ceylon were dismissed for only 58. Another century by Graveney enabled MCC to declare with a lead of over 200 and Ceylon collapsed again in their second innings, Statham taking two for ten.

=== 1952 season ===
Statham was not chosen for a Test match against India in 1952, the selectors preferring Bedser and Trueman to open the attack. They were a complete success and so Statham simply didn't get a look-in. He played well for Lancashire and achieved his first hundred wicket season with 110 at 18.08 but there were no really outstanding performances, his best return being five for 32 and he had only two five-wicket innings and one of those was in the last match against Northamptonshire. Lancashire again finished third in the County Championship but well behind Surrey and Yorkshire. Playfair sounded a note of caution, however, in saying the Statham and Tattersall were carrying the attack with no sign of useful support. Statham's biographer Tony Derlien said that both of them were suffering from long-term after-effects of the sub-continental tour and Statham admitted that he felt stale that summer. The underlying issue, which dogged Lancashire through most of the 1950s, was the lack of bowling reserves of the right calibre and so Statham and Tattersall were always over-worked.

There was no MCC tour in 1952–53 so Statham returned to the accountancy firm for the winter months. He told Derlien that it gave him a much-needed rest from cricket.

=== 1953 season ===
Statham's next chance of a Test appearance was in the 1953 Ashes series. With 101 wickets at 16.33 in the season, he was third in the national averages behind Les Jackson and Tony Lock, but even this good form could not secure a regular England selection. He played in only one of the five Tests against Australia, the second one at Lord's where England played three pace bowlers and one spinner whereas they normally attacked with two seamers (always Bedser and Bailey) and two spinners. Statham was twelfth man twice in the series.

The Lord's Test was Statham's Ashes debut and he took two wickets. All of the first four Tests were drawn and England recovered the Ashes by winning the final Test at the Oval where England played two seamers, two spinners and one paceman but with Fred Trueman, who was still doing his national service, preferred to Statham. Trueman later commented on England captain Len Hutton's preference for seam over pace and so he and Statham did not bowl together for some years yet. If two pacemen were included in the squad, one of them would be twelfth man.

Lancashire had a good season in 1953, which was a wet summer (there was heavy rain on the day of the Coronation). Lancashire again finished third in the championship, this time behind Surrey and Sussex, but they were much closer to the title this time. It was argued that they would have won it but for frequent disruption of their home matches by the bad weather, a factor which had far less impact on their southern rivals. Lancashire were again well served by Statham and Tattersall but now with sterling support from the left arm spinner Bob Berry and there was a considerable improvement in the team's batting performances.

Before the Oval Test, MCC had named a nucleus of ten players for their forthcoming tour of the West Indies. This included Trueman but not Statham. During the Test match, on the Monday morning, the selectors announced the names of five more tourists and Statham was among these. Later the same day, he took five for 14 against Glamorgan at Old Trafford.

=== 1953–54 in the West Indies ===
After the euphoria of regaining the Ashes, the winter tour of West Indies began disastrously for England who lost the first two Tests but then recovered to draw the series 2–2 with one match drawn. The series was a personal triumph for Statham who established himself as a world-class bowler. He headed the Test averages with 16 wickets at 28.75, this on pitches widely acknowledged as being favourable to the batsmen. England's recovery hinged on his dramatic opening spell of three wickets for ten runs in the Third Test at Georgetown when he dismissed Frank Worrell, Jeff Stollmeyer and Clyde Walcott.

Statham and Trueman were both selected for the first Test against West Indies at Sabina Park in Jamaica, the first time they bowled in tandem. Although Statham took six wickets in the match, including four for 90 in the first innings, England as a team did not play well and lost the match by 140 runs. West Indies won the second Test at Bridgetown by 181 runs, Statham taking four wickets.

It was mainly because of his dramatic opening spell at Georgetown, three wickets for ten runs reducing West Indies to 16 for three, that they had to follow on and England won by nine wickets, despite a notorious crowd riot involving bottle throwing. This spell was described by commentator E. W. Swanton as the best performance by an England fast bowler since the war, especially so considering the quality of the batsmen and the pitch.

Statham's tour ended on the first morning of the fourth Test at Port-of-Spain when he pulled a rib muscle and could not bowl again on the tour. Wisden evidently thought he was well out of the match because, on such a true and easy-paced surface, even he would have found difficulty in worrying the batsmen. At the end of the tour, Hutton said that Statham had been England's biggest weapon and predicted that he would be a key bowler in Australia next winter.

=== 1954 season ===
In 1954, Statham was effective when available to play against Pakistan who were on their first tour of England. Because of injury, he missed England's shock defeat at The Oval in the fourth Test. He headed the national first-class averages for the first time, though his tally of wickets was limited to 92 because of appalling weather constantly interrupting cricket in Lancashire. Playfair noted that Lancashire had slipped from third to tenth in the championship but blamed the weather which ruined eleven of their matches. The main problem that Lancashire had was the lack of a second good fast bowler, their attack being effectively limited to Statham, off spinner Roy Tattersall and left arm spinner Malcolm Hilton.

=== Cricketer of the Year awards ===
Statham was chosen as one of the five Wisden Cricketers of the Year for 1954, the award being announced in the 1955 edition of Wisden Cricketer's Almanack. The other four players were Bruce Dooland, Fazal Mahmood, Eric Hollies and George Tribe. Unless there are exceptional circumstances, a player may only receive this award once in his career. The original format Playfair annual selected a team of the season in each of its 1950 to 1962 editions under the heading of Playfair's XI Cricketers of the Year. In contrast to the Wisden award, there was no limit on the number of times a player could be selected by Playfair. In the 1955 edition, Statham was named for the first time (he was also selected in 1956 and 1961). In its summary of Lancashire's 1954 season, Playfair gave Statham a special mention by praising him as a greatly improved bowler who took a wicket once every six overs.

In its Cricketer of the Year dedication, Wisden said Statham was always considered by the selectors, but had to fight for his place because of the competition from Bailey, Bedser and Trueman. Statham was a self-assured young man, said Wisden, though always ready to listen and learn. The editor predicted, correctly, that Statham would be a personality in English cricket for many more years to come.

== 1954–55 in Australia and New Zealand ==
Statham was selected by MCC to tour Australia and New Zealand in 1954–55. In the foreword to his book about this tour, Frank Tyson talked about Len Hutton placing almost all his faith in Tyson and Statham, whom Tyson described as a tireless, skilful into-the-wind bowler. The tour was all about fast bowling and it was all because of fast-paced pitches, which Tyson and Statham could exploit to the full. From the start, Hutton put the opposition in to bat when he won the toss. Statham said the tour boasted the fastest and bounciest pitches he ever bowled on, especially the one at the WACA Ground in Perth.

The tour was the last one to be undertaken by sea voyage only and the team were away from England from September until April. The first match, in which Statham and Tyson both played, was a one-day stopover in Ceylon on 30 September. The matches in Australia were played from 11 October until 3 March, and in New Zealand from 5 to 28 March. A total of 28 matches were played including seven Tests and fourteen other first-class matches. Statham played in all seven Tests (five in Australia and two in New Zealand) and in thirteen first-class matches altogether. He took 54 first-class wickets (30 in Tests) and this was the highest tour tally in his entire career. Statistically, his best performances were the six for 23 which he took at Perth against Western Australia and his five for 60 at Melbourne in the third Test.

Hutton's tactics went awry in the first Test at The Gabba in Brisbane where the pitch was not as fast as expected and England's fielders somehow contrived to drop twelve catches, half of them off Statham's bowling. As a result, Australia amassed 601 for eight declared and went on to win by an innings and 154 runs. Although Statham finished with two for 123, one of his rare centuries conceded, the Australian and English media all agreed that his bowling was top-class.

In terms of his contribution to the England team, it is widely agreed that Statham's most outstanding performance was in the second innings of the second Test at the Sydney Cricket Ground when Tyson bowled at frightening speed with a strong wind behind him. Tyson had shortened his run-up and this had the beneficial result of increasing his accuracy. Statham toiled into the wind at the other end and his accuracy gave the Australian batsmen no respite. Tyson took six for 85 and Statham three for 45 from nineteen eight-ball overs, an immense physical effort. Their performance enabled England to snatch an unexpected victory by 38 runs, having been 74 behind on first innings. If Australia had won the second Test to take a two-nil lead, the series would almost certainly have been settled but Statham and Tyson changed that and England went on to win it by three Tests to one. Statham and Tyson shook hands on the field when the last Australian wicket fell and, afterwards, were full of praise for each other. Statham said of Tyson that he was at least two yards faster than himself and that watching him from the outfield, let alone batting against him, was frightening. Tyson for his part said he felt as if Yehudi Menuhin had been playing second fiddle to his lead.

In searing heat, England won the third Test at Melbourne where there was controversy about suspected watering of the MCG pitch. England batted first and were dismissed for a disappointing 191 which would have been disastrously much less but for a fighting century by the young Colin Cowdrey. When Australia batted through Saturday and into Monday morning (Sunday was a rest day), Statham was England's outstanding bowler with five for 60. Australia were all out for 231, a lead of 40. It was the first time Statham took five in a Test innings. John Arlott nevertheless insisted he had been unlucky not to have an even better analysis. England made 279 in their second innings so Australia needed 240 to win and were generally expected to get them as they reached 75 for two at the end of the fourth day's play. On the final day, Tyson and Statham destroyed Australia and England won by 128 runs. Tyson took seven for 27 in what is remembered as his greatest bowling performance but he said afterwards that the analyses could so easily have been reversed. Statham finished with two for 38 and so took seven for 98 in the match.

On Wednesday, 19 January 1955, Statham was playing for MCC in a two-day match against a South Australian Country XI in Mount Gambier, which was at the time celebrating its city charter. The Country XI in their second innings were dismissed for 45. Statham came on to bowl when the score was 27 for three and, after he had bowled 26 balls, he had taken six wickets (all bowled) for no runs. He finished with six for three from four eight-ball overs including three maidens.

Soon afterwards, the fourth Test was played at the Adelaide Oval on a good batting pitch. At the end of the fourth day, Australia on 69 for 3 had a lead of 51 and it was widely expected that the match would be drawn. Statham to that point had not taken a wicket. He was troubled by the big toe on his left foot after removal of an ingrowing nail just before the match began. He had been using padding to try and protect the toe but this wasn't helping. The MCC masseur, Harold Dalton, had the idea of cutting a hole in the leather toecap of Statham's boot and this provided a great relief. He was then able, with Tyson, to bowl unchanged throughout the morning session of the final day in a temperature of above 90 degrees Fahrenheit. Australia were reduced to 103 for nine and Statham took three for twelve that morning; Tyson took three for seventeen. The Australians were all out for 111 at half past two, leaving England to make 94 and win not only the match but also the series. The final Test was ruined by rain and drawn. Statham ended the series with eighteen wickets at 27.72.

Wisden wrote that, having been England's leading Test wicket-taker in the West Indies twelve months earlier, Statham reached his peak in Australia. While Tyson's name was in the headlines, it was the quiet man Statham who made it all possible and, with Alec Bedser fading from the scene, had become England's most reliable bowler.

Statham played in both the Tests in New Zealand which England won easily, the second by an innings and 20 runs after New Zealand were dismissed for a mere 26 in their second innings, the lowest team total in Test cricket's history. He took twelve wickets in the two matches with a best return of four for 24 in the first Test at Carisbrook in Dunedin.

At Basin Reserve in Wellington, Statham and Tyson underwent a timed bowling speed test which resulted in 85 mph for Statham and 89 mph for Tyson, though Tyson was not bowling flat out as he had done in Australia. In addition, the test took place in wet conditions. In good bowling conditions, Statham's top speed would have been over ninety, which is very fast indeed. The generally accepted world record for the fastest recorded delivery of a cricket ball is 100.23 mph by Shoaib Akhtar at Cape Town's Newlands Cricket Ground in February 2003.

== 1955 to 1957 ==
=== 1955 season ===
Lancashire slipped to ninth in the County Championship, largely because Statham had no regular fast bowling partner and, crucially given frequent unavailability, no backup. He played for the county only sixteen times, half their total matches, because of not only Test calls but also illness and injury problems. In county cricket, he took 84 wickets at 12.82 and Playfair said he remained the major problem for opposing batsmen at Old Trafford, especially so on good pitches which didn't help other bowlers.

The Test series was against South Africa and ended in a 3–2 win for England who had won the first two matches only for South Africa to win the next two and level the series for a decider at the Oval. Statham played in four Tests but missed the third at Old Trafford. He opened the bowling with Tyson in the first Test at Trent Bridge, where England won by an innings and 5 runs. He took only one wicket in the match while Tyson was the matchwinner by taking five wickets in 45 balls to destroy the South African second innings.

Tyson was injured before the Lord's Test and Trueman was recalled to partner Statham in a home Test for the first time. England won the toss and batted first but were dismissed for only 133 and South Africa reached 142 for five at close of play on the first day. They were all out on day two for 304, a substantial lead of 171, Statham and Trueman taking two wickets each. England's batsmen did much better in the second innings and totalled 353 before being all out on the Saturday evening. South Africa, with two full days left, needed 183 to win. Statham dismissed both openers before the close when South Africa were precariously placed at 17 for two which was in effect 17 for three because Jack Cheetham suffered a nasty injury when he was struck on the elbow by the final ball of the day, bowled by Trueman. On Monday, Statham routed South Africa with what Playfair called a fine display of hostile bowling. His figures were seven for 39 and England won by 71 runs. In Statham's Wisden obituary, the writer recalled this match and said Statham bowled unchanged in a feat of endurance, causing South Africa to lose a match they had been dominating.

Having missed the third Test, Statham returned to partner Peter Loader in the fourth at Headingley where South Africa won by 224 runs to level the series. Statham took three for 35 in the first innings when South Africa were dismissed for 171. England's first innings lead was only 20 and South Africa soon overtook that before amassing exactly 500 in their second innings, Statham taking two wickets for a huge 129 runs. He was rarely so expensive. England were all out for 256. South Africa's win set up a series decider at the Oval where England played an attack of Statham, Bailey, Laker and Lock (one pace, one seam, two spinners). The spinners made the difference, Laker and Lock sharing 15 wickets for England to win by 92 runs. Statham took two for 31 and none for 17. His series tally was 17 wickets at 21.35 and he was the leading English wicket-taker.

Statham as a typical tail-ender was rarely mentioned for his batting but he made the highest first-class score of his career in 1955 with 62 for Lancashire against Leicestershire. He could have scored many more but his captain, Cyril Washbrook, asked him to get himself out so that he would be fresh to bowl. Statham took a total of 108 first-class wickets in the season at 14.56, his best return being the seven for 39 in the Lord's Test. He took ten wickets in a match for the first time in his career with five for 27 and five for 21 (ten for 48 in the match) against Warwickshire at Old Trafford in May. Lancashire won the match by 72 runs. For the second season in succession, he was included in the Playfair XI.

=== 1956 season ===
There was no winter tour in 1955–56. The summer of 1956 was exceptionally wet and the pitches consistently favoured spin bowling. Lancashire benefited in that respect as both Roy Tattersall and Malcolm Hilton took over 100 wickets and the team finished a close second to Surrey in the championship. Statham struggled on the unhelpfully slow pitches and failed to reach the hundred wicket milestone, taking 91 at 14.84 with a best of six for 27. In July, he achieved the first hat-trick of his professional career against Sussex at Old Trafford. His victims were Jim Parks (lbw), Ken Suttle (lbw) and Derek Semmence (bowled).

Statham appeared in only three of the five Tests including the one at Old Trafford in which Jim Laker took his world record nineteen wickets. Statham took seven wickets in the series at 26.28 with a best of three for 33 at the Oval. He ruefully summarised the series by saying that he was mainly a fielder. He always performed well in the field given his athleticism and, in the Old Trafford Test, he held a difficult catch on the boundary to dismiss Richie Benaud as one of Laker's nineteen.

=== 1956–57 in South Africa ===
As in 1955, South Africa recovered from being two down to level the series but this time, with one match drawn, the series ended with two wins apiece. Questions were raised about pitch preparation as there were instances of rapid deterioration. Statham played in four of the Tests and took fourteen wickets at 24.92 with a best of three for 37. Wisden remarked that he had days when he looked the best fast bowler in the world but he was troubled by injuries and his form faded towards the end of the tour.

Statham played in four matches at the newly built Wanderers Stadium near Johannesburg. It is 5,700 feet above sea level and Statham had breathing problems because of the rarefied air, though his teammate Peter Loader found it helpful in clearing his asthma. To help Statham, Harold Dalton had an oxygen cylinder placed in the MCC dressing room and Statham said that using this for five minutes during each interval solved his problem. In the first match at the Wanderers against Transvaal, Statham took an all-bowled hat-trick to dismiss Gerald Ritchie, Morris Charnas and Peter Heine. The first Test at the Wanderers was played late December and Statham took his 100th Test wicket.

== 1957 to 1959 ==
=== 1957 season ===
Lancashire dropped to sixth in the County Championship, winning ten of their 28 matches. Statham took 112 wickets for the county at 12.77 including his best-ever innings return of eight for 34 (fifteen for 89 in the match) against Warwickshire at Coventry. England won the Test series against West Indies with three innings victories and two matches drawn. It was in this series that the famous Statham/Trueman partnership began in earnest. They bowled together in the first three Tests until Statham was sidelined by injury. He took thirteen wickets in the series with a best of five for 118. He and Trueman shared fifteen wickets in the drawn Trent Bridge Test, which England would probably have won but for bad weather.

Statham's consistent control of line and length meant that it was very difficult for a batsman to hit him for six and it happened only rarely, even off his bad balls. In the Trent Bridge Test, Collie Smith played a back foot drive to a full-length delivery and the ball sailed over Statham's head and onto the roof of the pavilion. Statham said later that he was astounded, especially as Smith was in the not-so-nervous nineties at the time (he went on to score 168).

=== 1958 season ===
Statham had an outstanding season in county cricket and took 134 wickets overall at a career-best season average of 12.29. He had ten five-wicket innings with a best of seven for 29 (thirteen for 64 in the match) against Leicestershire at Old Trafford. Statham and Tattersall bowled Glamorgan out for 26 in Cardiff. The arrival of Ken Higgs from Staffordshire made a huge difference to the team by providing Statham with the new ball support he had hitherto always needed. Lancashire finished seventh in the championship but, although that was one place lower than in 1957, Playfair commented that they had gained far more than they had lost by placing their faith in some promising young players. At Derby, he took his career total of wickets past 1,000 in Lancashire's match against Derbyshire.

For various reasons, Statham played in only the fourth and fifth Tests against New Zealand and took seven wickets at 18.57 with best figures of four for 71. England won the first four Tests and the fifth was drawn.

Statham had an outstanding game against Yorkshire in the Roses Match at Headingley, where Lancashire won by eight wickets. In the first innings, with the ball achieving tremendous lift and deviation off a drying pitch, Statham took six for sixteen and Yorkshire scored only 64. All his victims were caught close to the wicket and A. A. Thomson remarked that the Yorkshire batsmen were offering catches as if snicking the ball was some kind of virus epidemic. The admiration and respect which cricket followers always had for Statham was demonstrated by the standing ovation given to him by a large Yorkshire crowd as he left the field.

=== 1958–59 in Australia ===
England's tour of Australia in 1958–59 was disastrous, mainly because of mismanagement, and they lost the Test series 4–0 but Statham was one of the better players and bowled well. His seven for 57 at the MCG was his best return against Australia. Wisden said that, in addition to this performance which was still not enough to prevent an Australian victory, Statham often bowled equally well for less reward.

Statham's tour ended prematurely after he was involved in a road accident. He and Peter Loader were passengers in a car which had a burst tyre. The driver lost control and the car overturned. Both players had superficial injuries but were affected by shock and, after treatment, they were sent home. This was before the fifth Test and so they missed the New Zealand leg of the tour.

== 1959 to 1961 ==
=== 1959 season ===
Wisden 1960 recalled a wonderful summer with days on end of glorious sunshine, but the dry conditions meant it was not a summer for bowlers. Statham and Trueman, said Wisden, were the mainspring of the England attack. Statham took 139 first-class wickets at 15.01 with a best return of eight for 44. In the series against India, he played in only three of the five Tests because of injury. He took seventeen wickets at 13.11, England winning all five matches convincingly. Lancashire had a chequered season in that they defeated all their main rivals but lost matches against teams lower in the table. They finished fifth and Playfair's verdict was that they should have done better. Statham and Higgs both topped 100 wickets for the county and so Lancashire at last had an effective fast bowling partnership, although Statham's injuries were a problem.

When Lancashire met Kent at Gravesend, Statham was invited to stay at the home of his friend Colin Cowdrey. Lancashire batted first and scored 316. Kent, on the second morning, had reached 24 for two when Cowdrey came in to bat. He was on top form and played an outstanding innings of 198 before Statham finally dismissed him lbw. The match became a high-scoring draw. Statham's figures were three for 121, one of his rare centuries conceded and among his most expensive returns. When asked to comment on his figures and Cowdrey's innings, he wryly responded that Cowdrey was just making him pay for his bed and breakfast. Statham had his revenge in August when Kent came to Old Trafford. He dismissed Cowdrey for one and took five for 31 to dismiss Kent for only 83 before Lancashire went on to win inside two days. This was Cyril Washbrook's last home game and Lancashire went retro next season by appointing Bob Barber, one of the last of the amateurs, as their new captain instead of another professional.

=== 1959–60 in the West Indies ===
Statham was named as MCC's senior professional ahead of this tour, which meant he sat in on selection meetings. In the Test series, he played in three of the five matches and took ten wickets at 28.60. England won the series with victory in the second Test at Port-of-Spain, the other four matches all being drawn. It was the first time England had won a series in the Caribbean. England owed their victory in Trinidad to Statham and Trueman who dismissed West Indies for only 112 after England had opened with 382.

=== 1960 season ===
Statham and Trueman both played in all five Tests against South Africa and England won the controversial series by three Tests to nil with two matches drawn. Statham had an outstanding match at Lord's where he took six for 63 and five for 34 (eleven for 97 in the match), leading England to victory by an innings and 73 runs. In the series, he took 27 wickets at 18.18 and Trueman took 25 at 20.32 so it was this series which set the seal on their famous new-ball partnership. At county level, his partnership with Higgs gave Lancashire such a formidable opening attack that, until mid-August, they looked like winning the County Championship, but it was not to be and they eventually lost out to perennial rivals Yorkshire despite winning both the Roses matches (in the one at Old Trafford, the winning run was scored off the last ball of the match with two wickets standing). As for why Lancashire did not take the title, Playfair reckoned it was because they could not cover for Statham and Geoff Pullar when they were absent playing for England. Statham made the Playfair XI for the third and final time.

=== 1960–61 in South Africa and Rhodesia ===
Statham joined the International Cavaliers team to Rhodesia and South Africa from September to October 1960, the beginning of the 1960–61 South African season. It was a strong Anglo-Australian eleven led by Richie Benaud and including Fred Trueman, Ken Barrington, Tom Graveney, Ray Illingworth, Bob Simpson and Norm O'Neill among others. They played in five first-class matches including one against a South African XI and won four with one drawn. Statham took 21 wickets at 11.42 with best figures of five for 29.

== 1961 to 1963 ==
=== 1961 season ===
Statham played in four of the five tests against Richie Benaud's Australians, who retained the Ashes. He missed the third Test at Headingley in which Trueman blew Australia away with eleven for 88 in the match. That was England's only success, Australia winning at Lord's and Old Trafford. Statham took five for 53 in the first innings at Old Trafford, a match England should certainly have won but for a disastrous batting collapse on the final day after they had allowed a dramatic last wicket stand of 98 between Alan Davidson and Graham McKenzie. Statham took 17 wickets in the series at 29.47.

Statham enjoyed a record benefit of £13,047. He took 104 wickets in the season at 20.25 with best figures of six for 27. Lancashire dropped to thirteenth in the championship and Playfair said it was the club's worst-ever season.

=== 1962 season ===
In 1962, Statham bowled as well as ever in the Tests against Pakistan, though he played in only three of the five matches. He took sixteen wickets at 17.37 but the England bowlers had things very much their own way in this series as the Pakistani batsmen performed well below Test standard. Overall, Statham captured 102 first-class wickets at 21.63, a much higher average than normal. He took 86 wickets for Lancashire, but the team again struggled and finished sixteenth, next to bottom of the table. Playfair asked what was wrong with Lancashire and suggested that the club was failing to make good use of the surrounding leagues when seeking new players. In addition, the writer pointed out that Statham, spearhead of the attack, was not getting any younger (he turned 32 in June 1962).

=== 1962–63 in Australia and New Zealand ===
When Statham and Trueman began the MCC tour of Australia and New Zealand in 1962–63, they had 229 and 216 Test wickets respectively and were poised to overtake the world record of 236 Test wickets set by their assistant-manager Alec Bedser. The Australian captain Richie Benaud was another contender with 219 wickets, but it was Statham who broke the record in the fourth Test at Adelaide when Trueman caught Barry Shepherd in the gully. Despite breaking the record, Statham rarely shone in the series, taking just thirteen wickets at 44.61 (he took 33 in all matches at 31.60). He extended the record to 242 wickets but returned to England while Trueman went on to New Zealand, where he broke the record only two months after Statham, who now began to fade out of Test cricket.

== 1963 to 1965 ==
=== 1963 season ===
In 1963, Statham's county form on over-grassed pitches was back to something close to his best but, on the less grassy surface of Old Trafford in the first Test against the West Indies, his bowling lacked its old venom. He was surprisingly replaced by the veteran seamer Derek Shackleton for the rest of the series. This move was heavily criticised in the press because it was well known that the Lord's pitch helped fast bowlers. Later in the season, Statham took five wickets in the first-ever limited overs match, for Lancashire against Leicestershire in the preliminary round of the new Gillette Cup tournament. Lancashire again struggled in the County Championship and finished fifteenth. Statham's tally was 113 at 16.58 with a best return of seven for 96.

=== 1964 season ===
In 1964, despite the arrival of Sonny Ramadhin to bolster the attack, Lancashire were again a poor team on the field, finishing fourteenth in the championship. Statham in 1964 bowled somewhat inconsistently and was never in contention for the Ashes Tests. He did take fifteen for 108 in the match against a weak Leicestershire side and had an innings return of seven for 50 against Warwickshire, completing the season with 110 wickets at 20.02.

=== 1965 season ===
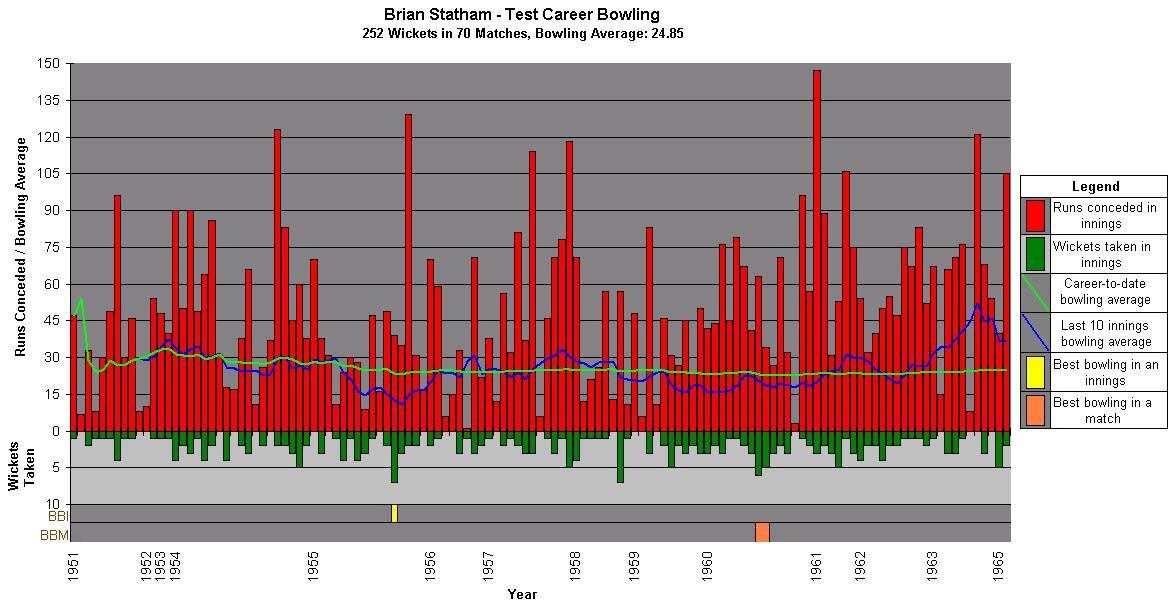
A graph showing Statham's Test career bowling statistics and how they have varied over time.

Statham was appointed club captain for 1965 (he had led the team a few times in 1962). He was a reluctant candidate but he provided inspirational leadership and Wisden noted a new spirit of keen endeavour in the team. The club committee declared his first year as captain to have been an unqualified success, but this had more to do with him achieving team harmony than on-field results. There was only a slight improvement with five championship wins and thirteenth place. As a bowler, Statham was as deadly as ever in the 1965 County Championship, taking 124 wickets for 12.41 apiece.

Statham's form in county cricket earned him an England recall at the age of 35 for the final Test against South Africa and he took five for 40 in the first innings. In all first-class matches in 1965, he took 137 wickets, his second-highest season tally, at 12.52 with best figures of eight for 69. He no longer wished to be considered for overseas tours and was therefore unavailable for the one to Australia and New Zealand in 1965–66. As a result, the 1965 Oval Test was his last. Having completed his Test career, he was awarded the CBE in the 1966 New Year's Honours in recognition of his services to cricket.

== 1966 to 1968 ==
=== 1966 season ===
Lancashire under Statham finished twelfth in the wet summer of 1966 with six wins. He personally had another successful season, taking 102 wickets at 14.50 in 25 matches. It was the thirteenth time he had taken 100 wickets in a season and that created a new club record which still stands. His best innings return was seven for 24 against Hampshire at Old Trafford. At Dover in August, he took ten in the match against Kent.

=== 1967 season ===
In 1967, now aged 35, Statham was slightly less effective and took 92 wickets at 16.63. It was the first time since 1956 that he failed to reach the hundred. Although Lancashire rose to eleventh in the championship, they won only four of their 28 matches. Lancashire's poor form was put into further perspective by the concurrent success of rivals Yorkshire, who won the title for the second successive season and for the sixth time in the last nine seasons. Statham was relieved of the Lancashire captaincy after the 1967 season and was replaced by Jack Bond who had been successful leading the Second XI. Statham decided to retire and announced that the 1968 season would be his last.

=== 1968 season ===
Lancashire improved under Bond's leadership and won eight matches to finish the 1968 season in sixth place, the title again going to Yorkshire. Statham took 69 wickets at an average of 17.08 and retired on Monday, 5 August, immediately after the home match against Yorkshire. He finished on a high note with a first innings return of six for 34 in that match, Yorkshire being all out for a mere 61. He took one for 50 in the second innings and the last wicket of his career was that of Phil Sharpe, who was lbw for 20. The match ended in a draw.

== Summary of matches played per team ==
Statham retired several weeks before the end of the season so his tally of 68 wickets was low, by his standards, for that reason. Apart from his debut season 1950 when he played in only fifteen matches, he was active through seventeen seasons before 1968 and always took more than 90 wickets. He achieved the hundred wicket target thirteen times with a highest tally of 139 in 1959. His highest overseas tally was the 54 he took in Australia and New Zealand in 1954–55.

He spent his entire first-class career at Lancashire and 430 of his 559 matches were for the county. He took a total of 1,816 wickets for Lancashire and that is a club record which, probably, will never be broken given the reduction in first-class matches since 1968. Next in the list is Johnny Briggs with 1,696 wickets and then Arthur Mold with 1,541. Statham made only five appearances for the county's Second XI, all in the spring of 1950 before his first-class debut. He played in 70 Test matches for England, taking 252 wickets, and so there were 59 first-class matches in which he represented other teams besides Lancashire or England.

He made 41 appearances for MCC on their overseas tours (this does not include Test matches, in which the MCC team was always styled England) and four at Lord's: one against the Indian tourists in 1952; two against Yorkshire, in 1953 and 1959; and one against The Rest in 1963. Incidentally, he played in two matches against MCC for Lancashire, in 1957 and 1964, both at Old Trafford.

The Gentlemen v Players match was held until 1962, usually twice a season during Statham's career, but he made just four appearances for the Players. These were all at Lord's in 1951, 1954, 1958 and 1960. His wickets total in these matches was eight and his best innings return was two for 22 in 1960, so this fixture never saw the best of him.

Statham's other ten matches were for an England XI (two matches in 1955 and one in 1964; these were not Test matches); the North v the South (two matches in 1957 and 1961); the International Cavaliers (four matches on this team's tour of South Africa in 1960–61); and the Bombay Cricket Association President's XI (one relief fund match in April 1968).

== Style and personality ==
Gary Sobers commented upon the formidable challenge posed to batsmen by the combination of Statham and Trueman in tandem. He said of Statham, however, that he could be too accurate. Sobers explained that once a good batsman had established himself at the crease, he knew exactly where the ball was going to pitch and so, assuming he had the necessary skill, could move into position just as the ball was about to be delivered. It meant, said Sobers: "Brian had to get the good batsmen out early or he could bowl them into form". Sobers' view was echoed by Neville Cardus who wrote the post-retirement tribute to Statham in the 1969 Wisden. Cardus asserted that Statham sometimes bowled too superbly, meaning that tail-end batsmen could not cope with his unerring accuracy. Cardus acknowledged that good batsmen are not tail-enders and he famously quoted Statham as saying: "When I bowl and they miss, well, they are usually out". The onus was on the good batsman to not miss and that confirms the point made by Sobers about knowing where the ball would pitch and then getting into position before it arrived.

Statham's bowling action was criticised by some people when he started playing (see above) but Cardus praised his rhythm and elasticity. Statham bowled with a somewhat chest-on style in that his left shoulder, in the delivery stride, didn't point in the direction of the delivery. Unlike Trueman, Statham did not bowl with a cartwheel action. Cardus had a theory that, because Statham was double-jointed, it was impossible for him to achieve what Cardus called forward shoulder rigidity and so a cartwheel was out of the question.

Jim Laker, writing in 1960, said he had never met a more placid or pleasant character than Statham, whom he called an inspiration. Laker was struck by the accuracy of Statham's bowling because it was so rare in a fast bowler to have such sureness of aim. He cited an instance when Statham, because of doubts about his fitness before one match, was asked to bowl flat out in the nets for the equivalent of three overs. There was no batsman involved and Statham was told to just bowl at the stumps. He hit them sixteen times out of eighteen. Laker commented on the unusual situation whereby Statham did not have an out-of-season job and wondered what he would do when he retired from cricket. Statham, said Laker, had no ambitions outside the game and was a contented, untroubled soul who looked forward to sleeping when not playing.

In Barclay's World of Cricket, Richie Benaud described Statham as the only fast bowler he could recall who did not resort to histrionics and abuse. Statham would merely shake his head to register frustration. Benaud said that Statham was always the catalyst in his partnerships with Tyson and Trueman because he was the one whom opposition batsmen most feared. This was not in the physical sense but in terms of the batsman having no margin for error given Statham's accuracy and movement off the seam. While Statham did not swing the ball through the air, his deviation off the pitch was unmatched. Wisden commented on this movement off the pitch by saying that when the ball pitched on the seam it broke back in very sharply, meaning that a ball ostensibly aimed at the off stump was suddenly flying towards the leg stump and the batsman was in real danger of being bowled or trapped leg before wicket.

Statham's final ball in first-class cricket was delivered at about 17:50 on Monday, 5 August 1968. It was the last ball in a spell of five successive maiden overs and it was pitched on a good length at the middle stump of Yorkshire captain Brian Close, who blocked it. The match ended at that point, the two captains agreeing to a draw. Close shook Statham's hand and Statham left the field to a standing ovation by the crowd of nearly 10,000 people, the applause led by Fred Trueman on the players' balcony. Next day, The Times regretted his decision to retire and said: "There are still hundreds of wickets left in him".

== Post-retirement ==
Statham's service to Lancashire was such that the club awarded him a second benefit in 1969, but it disappointingly raised only £1,850 compared with £13,047 for his 1961 benefit. He was elected a member of the Lancashire committee from 1970 until 1995 and was appointed president of the club in 1997 and 1998.

Despite his fame and popularity, Statham did not have an easy life after cricket. For a time, he was employed as a representative by Guinness. He enjoyed the work at first but after the company was taken over, he found he could not cope with increased productivity paperwork. Stress brought on illness and he had to take early retirement. In 1989, Fred Trueman discovered that he was in financial trouble, and organised two testimonial dinners for him. Trueman said at these that he had known Statham for fifty years and there was never a wrong word between them.

Brian Statham died of leukaemia at the Alexandra Hospital in Cheadle on Saturday, 10 June 2000, a week before his 70th birthday. He was survived by his wife Audrey, two sons and one daughter. He was cremated five days later at Manchester's Southern cemetery.

The section of Warwick Road which runs past Old Trafford was renamed Brian Statham Way in his honour and the south end of the ground, opposite the Pavilion End, is called the Brian Statham End. In August 2009, he was inducted into the ICC's Hall of Fame when his widow Audrey was presented with a commemorative cap at Old Trafford during a T20 international. On 30 July 2011, Tameside Council donated, for permanent display at Denton West Cricket Club, a commemorative plaque which was unveiled by Audrey in the presence of Brian's former teammates Geoff Clayton and Colin Hilton.

== Sources ==
- Cardus, Neville: Brian Statham – Gentleman George. Wisden Online (1969).
- Derlien, Tony: Bowled Statham. Breedon Books (1990).
- Frith, David: The Fast Men. TransWorld Publishing (1975).
- Howat, Gerald: Brian Statham. ODNB (2004).
- Laker, Jim: Over to me. Frederick Muller Ltd (1960).
- Lancashire County Cricket Club: Most Wickets for Lancashire. CricketArchive (2018).
- Lorimer, Malcolm: Glory Lightly Worn. Parrs Wood Press (2001).
- Manchester Evening News (MEN): Brian Statham to join ICC Hall of Fame. MEN Media (29 August 2009).
- Playfair: Playfair Cricket Annual. Playfair Books Ltd (1951 to 1969).
- Preston, Norman: Brian Statham – Cricketer of the Year 1955. Wisden Online (1955).
- Sobers, Garfield: Garry Sobers. My Autobiography. Headline (2002).
- Swanton, E. W. (editor): Barclays World of Cricket, 3rd edition. Willow Books (1986). Article on Brian Statham written by Richie Benaud.
- Telegraph Obituary: Brian Statham. Telegraph Media Group (2000).
- Trueman, Fred: As It Was. Macmillan (2004).
- Tyson, Frank: In the Eye of the Typhoon. Parrs Wood Press (2004).
- Wisden: Wisden Cricketers' Almanack. John Wisden & Co. Ltd (1951 to 1969).
- Wisden Obituary: Brian Statham. Wisden Online (2001).

Records
Preceded by Alec Bedser	World record – most career wickets in Test cricket 242 wickets (24.27) in 67 Tests; Held record 26 January 1963 to 15 March 1963	Succeeded by Fred Trueman
