= Athlone Town A.F.C. =

Athlone Town
- Full name: Athlone Town Association Football Club
- Nickname: The Town
- Founded: 1887; 139 years ago
- Ground: Athlone Town Stadium, Lissywollen, Athlone
- Capacity: 5,000 (2,500 seated)
- Chairman: Nick Giannotti
- Manager: Seán O'Connor
- League: League of Ireland First Division
- 2026: League of Ireland First Division, 7th of 10
- Website: athlonetownafc.ie
Home colours	Away colours

Athlone Town Association Football Club is an Irish football club from Athlone who are playing in the League of Ireland. The club is the oldest in the League as it was founded in 1887. First elected to the League of Ireland in 1922, they play their home matches in Lissywollen, their new stadium which opened in 2007. The Athlone Town AFC Women's team were established in 2020 and have been very successful in their few shorts years, winning multiple League and Cup titles.

== History ==
Athlone Town played their first official game on 9 February 1887 against Castlerea F.C. of Roscommon. The friendly match finished in a goalless draw. Initially, the club played their matches at the Sports Ground in Athlone.

=== 1920s ===
Athlone first competed at a national level in the 1922–23 season. They became the first club from outside the capital city of Dublin to join the newly renamed Free State League. The club ended their maiden campaign in sixth place and made it to the final of the League of Ireland Shield.

In 1924, Athlone Town won the FAI Cup, their first domestic success, beating Fordsons. Dinny Hannon scored the only goal of the game, as Athlone went through the whole competition without conceding a goal.

Hannon was one of five Athlone Town players chosen to represent the Irish Free State at the 1924 Paris Olympic Games. The other players were Tommy Muldoon, Frank Ghent, John Joe Dykes and Paddy O'Reilly. In 1926, Athlone Town moved into a new home at the Ranelagh Grounds. The Westmeath club remained in the League of Ireland until the end of the 1927–28 season when, following a poor season in which the team finished bottom of the table, they resigned from the league.

The club were also knocked out of FAI Cup in the first round after a 9–3 defeat to then non-league Drumcondra. Athlone, who were also in a perilous position financially, opted to return to provincial football and Drumcondra took their place in the league.

Athlone Town moved into their new home at St. Mel's Park in 1929 after two seasons spent at Ranelagh Gardens. Prior to then the club played at the town’s Sportsground.

In the 1950s, Athlone Town had a team competing in the Athletic Union League. They also entered a side into the FAI Junior Cup.

=== Intermediate football ===
Athlone Town were elected to the Intermediate-level League of Ireland B Division as founder members in 1964–65. The club reached the FAI Intermediate Cup final in 1967–68, losing 1–0 to Home Farm after a replay, but won the B Division's Castrol Trophy.

The Castrol Trophy was retained for the 1968–69 season and Athlone also won the league title's Blackthorn Trophy, finishing six points ahead of their closest rivals in the B Division; St. Patrick's Athletic. Athlone also reached the semi-final of the Leinster Senior Cup losing 0–1 to Bohemians.

=== League return and European competition ===
Chart of yearly table positions for Athlone Town in League of Ireland

Athlone Town were elected back into the League of Ireland for the 1969–70 season. Although they finished tenth in the league, Athlone won the Leinster Senior Cup, beating Shelbourne 4–0 in the final. The club finished second in the league in the 1974–75 season, earning a place in the UEFA Cup, the first time they had ever qualified for European competition. Their first-round game was against Norwegian side Vålerenga who they beat 3–1 at home before drawing 1–1 in Oslo. Athlone's second round tie was against Italian side AC Milan, drawing 0–0 in the first leg at St. Mel's Park, setting a record attendance of 9,000 before losing the second leg at the San Siro 3–0. Athlone closed out the decade with a trophy when they beat St. Patrick's Athletic to win the League Cup for the first time in 1979–80.

==== Domestic success ====
Athlone won their first league title in the 1980–81 season. This qualified them for the European Cup, where they played KB the following season. Although Athlone earned a draw in Denmark, they went out on away goals after a 2–2 draw in the return leg at St. Mel's Park. The 1981–82 season also saw the club win the League Cup for a second time, beating Shamrock Rovers in the final. However, Athlone failed to retain their league title that year, finishing fourth.

Athlone Town were again crowned league champions in the 1982–83 season and qualifying for Europe, and also retained the League Cup, beating Dundalk. Their opponents in Europe on this occasion were Belgian outfit Raymond Goethals managed Standard Liège, losing 3–2 at home and 8–2 in Liège.

In 1985 six new clubs were elected to the league, increasing the league's participation to 22. As a result, the current two division (Premier and First) structure was adapted with Athlone Town in Premier Division. In 1987 the club finished last and were relegated to the First Division. Their stay there was short, finishing top of First Division the following season, gaining promotion to the Premier Division. The club remained in the top flight until the 1991–92 season, when they finished eleventh and were subsequently relegated to the First Division.

Athlone Town again gained promotion to the Premier Division in the 1993–94 season, finishing runners-up to Sligo Rovers that season.

The club were once again relegated in 1996, narrowly missing out on promotion in 2001 by one point to Monaghan United.

=== New Stadium in Lissywollen ===
In 2007 the club moved from St Mel's Park to a new stadium, which was opened on 9 March when the home side hosted Kilkenny City in the opening game of the season. The new stadium features a single stand with a capacity of close to 2,000 seated spectators.

On 15 December 2008, the club held an emergency E.G.M. with supporters stating that they were in financial difficulties. Part finance had been raised and the club worked towards raising the rest. The club received funds through the patron scheme with over 350 fans contributing.

On 27 September 2013, Athlone clinched the First Division title with a 1–0 win over Waterford United.

In 2014, Athlone Town had a bad campaign in the Premier Division, finishing last in the championship, in the Leinster Senior Cup it was eliminated in the quarterfinals by St Patrick's Athletic, in the FAI Cup it was eliminated in the second round by Longford Town, and in the League Cup lost to Longford Town again in the first round. The club was relegated to the League of Ireland First Division.

In September 2017 the FAI banned goalkeeper Igors Labuts and midfielder Dragos Sfrijan for 12 months after a UEFA investigation found "clear and overwhelming betting evidence" of fixing of Athlone's 29 April match against Longford Town in the 2017 League of Ireland First Division. The Professional Footballers' Association of Ireland said the decision was based on "half-baked innuendo".

In 2018, a dispute over ownership of Athlone Town Stadium arose.

In November 2020, Athlone Town lost 11–0 to Dundalk F.C. in the FAI Cup semi final, which set a new record for the biggest win by a team in the history of the competition.

There are many youth teams, ranging from u13 boys' to u17 women's team.

In February 2026, the club announced changes at board level with Nick Giannotti, a shareholder in Plymouth Argyle and Larne F.C., becoming club chairman.

== Honours ==
- League of Ireland: 2
  - 1980–81, 1982–83
- FAI Cup: 1
  - 1923–24
- League of Ireland Cup: 3
  - 1979–80, 1981–82, 1982–83
- Leinster Senior Cup: 3
  - 1969–70, 1987–88, 1991–92
- LFA President's Cup: 1
  - 1983–84
- Tyler Cup: 1
  - 1979–80
- League of Ireland First Division: 2
  - 1987–88, 2013
- League of Ireland B Division: 2
  - 1968–69, 1983–84
- FAI Junior Cup
  - 1934–35, 1937–38: 2
- FAI Youth Cup
  - 1983–84: 1

== Players ==
As of 23 February 2026

Note: Flags indicate national team as defined under FIFA eligibility rules; some limited exceptions apply. Players may hold more than one non-FIFA nationality.

No.	Pos.	Nation	Player
1	GK	IRL	Brendan Clarke (captain)
2	DF	IRL	Reece Webb
3	DF	IRL	Kyle O'Connor
4	DF	IRL	Oisin Hand
5	DF	IRL	Evan O'Connor
6	MF	IRL	Aaron Moloney (on loan from Shelbourne)
7	DF	IRL	Derin Adewale (on loan from Shelbourne)
8	MF	IRL	Aaron Connolly
9	MF	IRL	Patrick Ferry
10	MF	IRL	Robbie Lyons
11	MF	IRL	Brian McManus
12	DF	BRA	Tatá
13	GK	IRL	Andrew Stuart Trainor

No.	Pos.	Nation	Player
14	FW	IRL	Gradi Lomboto
15	FW	IRL	Colm Doyle
17	DF	IRL	Conor Quinn
18	FW	IRL	Alex Sheerin
19	MF	IRL	Will Smith
21	FW	IRL	Cillian Tollett (on loan from Galway United)
22	DF	LTU	Rokas Katkausas
24	MF	MAS	Callum Cleary
25	GK	IRL	Conor Wall
28	MF	IRL	Martin Scally
—	FW	IRL	Peter Grogan
—	DF	IRL	Jonathan Kehir
—	DF	IRL	Dylan Connolly

== Technical staff ==
Position	Staff
Head coach	Seán O'Connor
Coach	Conor Barry
Coach	David Elebert
Coach	Emmett Egan
Kitman	Eamon Cunningham
Chairman	John Hayden
CEO	Steven Gray

== Former managers ==
- (Republic of Ireland) Billy Young (1969)
- (Republic of Ireland) Mick Dalton (1970)
- (Republic of Ireland) Amby Fogarty (1974–76)
- (Wales) Trevor Hockey (1976)
- (Republic of Ireland) Tommy Carroll (1976–77)
- (Republic of Ireland) Seán Thomas (1977–79)
- (Republic of Ireland) Turlough O'Connor (1979–85)
- (Republic of Ireland) Padraig O'Connor (1987–89)
- (Republic of Ireland) Mick Leech (1990–91)
- (Republic of Ireland) Pat Devlin (1991–92)
- (Republic of Ireland) Michael O'Connor (1992–95)
- (Republic of Ireland) Tony Mannion (1995–96)
- (Republic of Ireland) Dermot Keely (1996)
- (Republic of Ireland) Terry Eviston (1996–97)
- (Republic of Ireland) Liam Buckley (1997–98)
- (Republic of Ireland) Jimmy Greene (1999–00)
- (Republic of Ireland) Liam Buckley (2000–02)
- (Republic of Ireland) Aaron Callaghan (2004)
- (Republic of Ireland) Stephen Kelly (2004–05)
- (Republic of Ireland) John Gill (2005)
- (Republic of Ireland) Michael O'Connor (2005–07)
- (Republic of Ireland) Dermot Lennon (2007–09)
- (Republic of Ireland) Brendan Place (2009–10)
- (Republic of Ireland) Mike Kerley (2011–12)
- (Republic of Ireland) Padraig Moran (2012)
- (Republic of Ireland) Roddy Collins (2012–13)
- (Republic of Ireland) Mick Cooke (2014)
- (Republic of Ireland) Keith Long (2014)
- (Republic of Ireland) Eddie Wallace (2014–15)
- (Republic of Ireland) Alan Mathews (2015–16)
- (Republic of Ireland) Colin Fortune (2016–17)
- (Portugal) Ricardo Monsanto (2017)
- (Portugal) Ricardo Cravo (2017)
- (Republic of Ireland) Roddy Collins (2017–18)
- (Republic of Ireland) Aaron Callaghan (2018)
- (Republic of Ireland) Terry Butler (2018–2019)
- (Republic of Ireland) Adrian Carberry (2019–2021)
- (Republic of Ireland) Paul Doolin (2021)
- (Republic of Ireland) Martin Russell (2022)
- (Republic of Ireland) Dermot Lennon (2022–2023)
- (Republic of Ireland) Gordon Brett (2023)
- (United States) Emilio Williams (2023)
- (Portugal) Dario Castelo (2023–2025)
- (Republic of Ireland) Robbie Rock (2025)
- (Republic of Ireland) Ian Ryan (2025–2026)
- (Republic of Ireland) Conor Barry (interim) (2026)
- (Republic of Ireland) Seán O'Connor (2026–)

== Records and statistics ==
=== Appearances ===
- Most appearances: Dennis Clarke (361)

=== European record ===
==== Overview ====
Competition	Matches	W	D	L	GF	GA
European Cup	4	0	2	2	7	14
UEFA Cup	4	1	2	1	4	5
TOTAL	8	1	3	4	11	19

==== Matches ====
Season	Competition	Round	Opponent	Home	Away	Aggregate
1975–76	UEFA Cup	1R	(Norway) Vålerengen	3–1	1–1	4–2
1975–76	UEFA Cup	2R	(Italy) Milan	0–0	0–3	0–3
1981–82	European Cup	1R	(Denmark) KB	2–2	1–1	3–3 (a)
1983–84	European Cup	1R	(Belgium) Standard Liège	2–3	2–8	4–11
