= 1979–80 Tyler Cup =

Tournament details
- Country: Northern Ireland; Republic of Ireland
- Teams: 16

Final positions
- Champions: Athlone Town (1st title)
- Runners-up: Drogheda United

Tournament statistics
- Matches played: 16
- Goals scored: 49 (3.06 per match)

The 1979–80 Tyler Cup was the 2nd edition of the Tyler Cup, an association football cup competition featuring teams from Northern Ireland and the Republic of Ireland. It returned this season after not being played in 1978–79.

Athlone Town won the title, defeating Drogheda United 3–2 in the two-legged final.

== Results ==
=== First round ===
Team 1	Score	Team 2
Cliftonville	4–2	Bohemians
Coleraine	1–4	Athlone Town
Drogheda United	1–0	Larne
Dundalk	1–0 (a.e.t.)	Glenavon
Finn Harps	2–3	Glentoran
Linfield	2–1	Limerick
Portadown	1–3	Shamrock Rovers
Waterford	1–3	Ards

=== Quarter-finals ===
Team 1	Score	Team 2
Ards	1–3	Drogheda United
Athlone Town	2–1	Linfield
Glentoran	1–2	Dundalk
Shamrock Rovers	1–0	Cliftonville

=== Semi-finals ===
Team 1	Score	Team 2
Athlone Town	2–1	Shamrock Rovers
Dundalk	0–1	Drogheda United

=== Final ===
6 September 1979

Athlone Town	2–0	Drogheda United
Wyse 30'; McCue 68'

St Mel's Park, Athlone
Referee: K. Stewart (Belfast)

12 September 1979

Drogheda United	2–1	Athlone Town
Ferguson 33'; Leech 45'		Salmon 56'

United Park, Drogheda
Referee: Hugh Wilson (Belfast)

Athlone Town win 3–2 on aggregate.
