= Harry Duggan (footballer) =

Irish footballer (1903–1968)

Personal information
- Full name: Henry Anthony Duggan
- Date of birth: 8 June 1903
- Place of birth: County Dublin, Ireland
- Date of death: 8 September 1968 (aged 65)
- Height: 1.70 m (5 ft 7 in)
- Position: Outside right

Senior career*
Years	Team	Apps	(Gls)
19xx–1925	Richmond United		
1925–1936	Leeds United	187	(45)
1936–1940	Newport County	91	(13)
	→ (wartime league)	13	(0)

International career^{‡}
1927–1937	Irish Free State (FAI)	5	(1)
1929–1935	Ireland (IFA)	8	(0)
- * Club domestic league appearances and goals as of 16 December 2007 ‡ National team caps and goals as of 16 December 2007

Henry Anthony Duggan (1903–1968) was an Irish footballer. Described as a talented and speedy right winger, he played for both Leeds United and Newport County. Duggan was a dual internationalist and played for both Ireland teams – the FAI XI and the IFA XI.

== Biography ==
Duggan was born 8 June 1903 in County Dublin, Ireland

=== Leeds United ===
Duggan was playing intermediate football with Richmond United in Dublin when he was first spotted by Leeds United. He signed for the club on 1 May 1925 and scored his first league goal for Leeds on 6 November 1926 in a 2–2 draw with Sunderland. Despite this, he was initially confined to the reserves and only made a handful of first team appearances for United until he established himself as regular in the first team between 1930 and 1936. In 1932 he helped Leeds gain promotion to the First Division. His impressive goalscoring rate also endeared him to the fans. In eleven years at Leeds, Duggan made 187 league appearances, scoring 45 goals. He also played a further 9 games in the FA Cup, scoring a further 2 goals. During the 1933–34 season Duggan scored 11 goals in 33 league appearances. This included two in a 5–1 home win against Liverpool on 24 March 1934, two against Everton in a 2–2 draw on 30 March 1934 and 2 in an 8–0 win against Leicester City in April 1934. On 11 November 1935, he also scored a hat-trick in a 7–2 win against Sheffield Wednesday at Elland Road.

=== Newport County ===
Duggan signed for Newport County on 1 October 1936 and in 1939 he captained the team as they won the Third Division South title. Duggan was a County player when he won his last international cap. While playing for County, Duggan made 91 league appearances and scored 13 goals. During the 1939–40 wartime season, Duggan also played 13 games for County in the South-West Regional League.

== Irish international ==
When Duggan began his international career in 1927 there were, in effect, two Ireland teams, chosen by two rival associations. Both associations, the Northern Ireland – based IFA and the Irish Free State – based FAI claimed jurisdiction over the whole of Ireland and selected players from the whole island. As a result, several notable Irish players from this era, including Duggan, played for both teams.

=== FAI XI ===
Between 1927 and 1937 Duggan made 5 appearances and scored 1 goal for the FAI XI. He made his international debut on 23 April 1927 in a 2–1 defeat against Italy B at Lansdowne Road. Together with Mick O'Brien, Tommy Muldoon and Joe Kendrick, he became one of the first four English League-based players to play for the FAI XI. He then made his second appearance for the FAI XI on 11 May 1935 in a 3–1 away win against Belgium. Duggan made a further two appearances for the FAI XI during a European tour in May 1936. On 3 May he played in a 3–3 draw with Hungary and then on 9 May he played in a 5–1 win against Luxembourg. Other members of the touring party included Jimmy Dunne and Jimmy Kelly. On 7 November 1937 he made his final appearance for the FAI XI in a World Cup qualifier against Norway. A late goal from Duggan earned the FAI XI a 3–3 draw.

=== IFA XI ===
Between 1929 and 1935 Duggan made 8 appearances for the IFA XI. He made his debut for the IFA XI on 19 October 1929 in a 3–0 defeat against England. He played against England on three further occasions. On 17 October 1932 in a 1–0 defeat against England in Blackpool, Duggan, together with Jimmy Dunne, Jimmy Kelly and Paddy Moore, was one of four players born in what is now the Ireland to feature in the IFA XI forward line. Duggan also played twice for the IFA XI against Scotland and twice against Wales. He made his last appearance for the IFA XI in 2–1 defeat against Scotland on 11 November 1935

== Later years ==
After retiring as a footballer, Duggan settled in Beeston, Leeds, living in Cross Flatts Drive. He was an ARP warden during the Second World War and later worked for a firm of glass merchants. Some reports suggest he worked at the Moorhouses jam factory on Old Lane, as a checker. He died in Leeds in 1968.

== Honours ==
Leeds United

- Second Division
  - Runners Up 1931–32: 1

Newport County

- Third Division South
  - Winners 1938–39: 1
