= Mick O'Brien (footballer, born 1893) =

English footballer

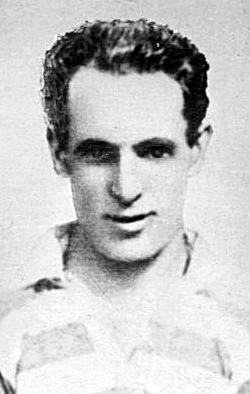
- O'Brien while with Queens Park Rangers in 1922.

Personal information
- Full name: Michael Terrance O'Brien
- Date of birth: 10 August 1893
- Place of birth: Ushaw Moor, England
- Date of death: 21 September 1940 (aged 47)
- Place of death: Uxbridge, England
- Height: 6 ft 1 in (1.85 m)
- Positions: Centre half; forward

Senior career*
Years	Team	Apps	(Gls)
1911	Walker Celtic		
- Wallsend
1912	Blyth Spartans		
1912–1913	Celtic	0	(0)
1913–14	Blyth Spartans		
1914–1915	Brentford	9	(3)
1918–1919	Alloa Athletic (trial)		
1919	Norwich City	10	(1)
1919–1920	South Shields	3	(0)
1920–1922	Queens Park Rangers	66	(3)
1922–1924	Leicester City	65	(6)
1924–1926	Hull City	74	(0)
1926	Brooklyn Wanderers	7	(0)
1926–1928	Derby County	3	(0)
1928–1929	Walsall	34	(0)
1929–1931	Norwich City	64	(5)
1931–1933	Watford	61	(5)

International career
1921–1927	Ireland	10	(0)
1927–1932	Irish Free State	4	(0)
1921	English League XI	1	(2)

Managerial career
- 1933–1935: Queens Park Rangers
- 1935–1936: Brentford (assistant)
- 1936–1937: Ipswich Town
- 1939–1940: Cork City
- * Club domestic league appearances and goals

Michael Terrance O'Brien (10 August 1893 – 21 September 1940) was an Irish footballer and coach whose career took him to at least 17 different clubs. A well-built six-footer, O'Brien was highly regarded as a centre-half. O'Brien was a dual international and played for both Ireland teams – the IFA XI and the FAI XI. In April 1927, O'Brien made his debut for the FAI XI, four days after he made his last appearance for the IFA XI. During the 1930s, O'Brien managed both Queens Park Rangers and Ipswich Town.

== Club career ==
O'Brien did not play football until he was 18, when his family settled in South Shields in County Durham. He then played for several clubs in the North East of England, including Blyth Spartans, before attracting the interest of Celtic. However, after failing to make it into the Celtic first team he joined Brentford in December 1914. During the First World War, O'Brien served in both the Royal Navy and the Royal Flying Corps.

Between 1919 and 1933, O'Brien went on to make 370 English League appearances, scoring 19 goals, for eight different clubs. These included Queens Park Rangers, Leicester City, Hull City, Walsall, Norwich City and Watford. Although best known as a centre half, he was also capable of playing in the forward line and, while playing as an inside-left, he scored twice for an English League XI against a British Army XI in 1921 In 1926 he also had a brief spell playing for Brooklyn Wanderers, making 7 appearances in the American Soccer League.

== Irish international ==
During the years O'Brien played international football, there were, in effect, two Ireland teams, chosen by two rival associations. Both associations, the Northern Ireland–based IFA and the Irish Free State–based FAI, claimed jurisdiction over the whole of Ireland and selected players from the whole island. As a result, several notable Irish players from this era, including O'Brien, played for both teams. Meanwhile, many sources claim that O'Brien was from Kilcock, County Kildare. But although he may well have had family there, it has been established by the programme editor at Brentford FC (a former club) that he was born in Ushaw Moor, County Durham. There is speculation that he may have concocted the story about Kilcock in order to be eligible to represent the two Irish Associations (a parent or grandparent was not sufficient to qualify in those days, it had to be birthplace).

=== IFA XI ===
Between 1921 and 1927, while playing for Queens Park Rangers, Leicester City and Hull City, O'Brien made 10 appearances for the IFA XI. He made his international debut on 2 February 1921 at Windsor Park in a 2–0 defeat against Scotland. His teammates on the day included Bill Lacey and Louis Bookman. On 13 February 1926, on his ninth appearance, he helped the IFA XI to a 3–0 win against Wales. This was the only time O'Brien played in a winning IFA XI. He made his last appearance for the IFA XI on 19 April 1927 in a 2–2 draw with Wales.

=== FAI XI ===
Between 1927 and 1932 O'Brien also made 4 appearances for the FAI XI. O'Brien was playing for four different clubs – Derby County, Walsall, Norwich City and Watford – when he won each of his four FAI caps. He made his debut for the FAI XI on 23 April 1927, four days after he made his last appearance for the IFA XI. Despite the FAI XI losing 2–1 in the friendly against Italy B at Lansdowne Road, O'Brien was noted for his performance. The game also saw him, together with, Tommy Muldoon, Harry Duggan and Joe Kendrick, become one of the first four English League based players to represent the FAI XI. He subsequently played twice for the FAI XI against Belgium in 1929 and 1930, helping them to 4–0 and 3–1 victories respectively. He won his last cap for the FAI XI on 5 May 1932 against the Netherlands. The now veteran O'Brien put in a commanding performance as he captained a young FAI XI that included Paddy Moore, Alex Stevenson and Jimmy Kelly to a 2–0 win.

== Coaching career ==
After retiring as a player O'Brien became a coach, managing Queens Park Rangers between 1933 and 1935. He led the club to fourth place in Third Division South in the 1933–34 season. However a poor season in 1934–35 led to his dismissal. After a spell as assistant manager at Brentford, O'Brien then took charge at Ipswich Town on 29 May 1936. He became the club's first professional manager and during the subsequent 1936–37 season they made their professional debut in the Southern League and finished as champions. In later years O'Brien worked as a coach for the Middlesex FA.

== Honours ==
=== Manager ===
Ipswich Town

- Southern League: 1936–37
