= 1980–81 League of Ireland =

League of Ireland
- Season: 1980–81
- Teams: 16
- Champions: Athlone Town (1st title)
- Top goalscorer: Eugene Davis (Athlone Town); 23 goals

Statistics of League of Ireland in the 1980–81 season.

== Overview ==
It was contested by 16 teams, and Athlone Town won the championship.

== Final classification ==
Pos	Team	Pld	W	D	L	GF	GA	GD	Pts	Qualification or relegation
1	Athlone Town A.F.C. (C)	30	23	5	2	67	22	+45	51	Qualification to European Cup first round
2	Dundalk F.C.	30	20	5	5	63	28	+35	45	Qualification to Cup Winners' Cup first round
3	Limerick United	30	17	7	6	47	25	+22	41	Qualification to UEFA Cup first round
4	Bohemian F.C.	30	10	16	4	38	25	+13	36	
5	Shamrock Rovers F.C.	30	14	8	8	37	29	+8	36	
6	Finn Harps F.C.	30	12	6	12	41	39	+2	30	
7	Waterford	30	11	8	11	32	35	−3	30	
8	St Patrick's Athletic F.C.	30	11	6	13	45	48	−3	28	
9	Cork United	30	11	6	13	37	42	−5	28	
10	Drogheda United F.C.	30	10	7	13	47	55	−8	27	
11	Sligo Rovers F.C.	30	12	2	16	45	57	−12	26	
12	University College Dublin A.F.C.	30	8	9	13	37	49	−12	25	
13	Galway Rovers (Note: Galway Rovers changed their club name to Galway United for next season.)	30	6	9	15	26	39	−13	21	
14	Home Farm F.C.	30	7	6	17	34	55	−21	20	
15	Shelbourne F.C.	30	6	6	18	31	52	−21	18	
16	Thurles Town F.C.	30	7	4	19	38	65	−27	18	

Source: www.rsssf.com
(C) Champions

== Results ==
Home \ Away	ATH	BOH	CUF	DRO	DUN	FHA	GAL	HOM	LIM	SHM	SHE	SLI	StP	THU	UCD	WAT
Athlone Town	—	1–1	5–1	5–1	2–1	3–2	2–0	2–1	0–0	1–1	2–0	3–1	2–0	3–2	4–1	2–0
Bohemians	1–1	—	1–1	1–1	1–1	2–2	1–0	0–0	1–1	0–0	0–2	5–0	0–0	2–0	1–1	0–1
Cork United	1–1	2–1	—	2–1	1–1	0–1	1–0	0–2	0–2	0–0	3–0	1–2	1–1	0–1	1–0	0–1
Drogheda United	2–3	2–2	4–1	—	1–1	3–1	2–3	1–1	1–0	2–0	1–1	3–1	2–5	1–3	1–3	1–3
Dundalk	0–3	1–2	3–0	5–2	—	2–0	3–1	3–2	0–1	2–1	2–1	1–0	3–1	6–1	3–0	3–0
Finn Harps	0–1	0–1	1–0	0–0	1–2	—	3–2	6–2	0–2	2–0	1–0	2–1	2–1	1–0	2–0	1–2
Galway Rovers	0–2	0–0	0–1	0–1	1–1	1–1	—	0–1	1–2	0–1	2–0	2–2	1–0	1–1	0–1	0–0
Home Farm	2–1	1–0	1–3	0–1	0–4	0–2	2–3	—	1–2	0–1	1–1	1–3	0–1	2–2	1–0	2–4
Limerick United	0–2	0–0	1–3	3–0	0–0	0–0	0–0	2–1	—	1–2	3–1	2–1	2–0	2–1	4–1	0–0
Shamrock Rovers	0–3	2–2	2–0	1–2	1–2	2–1	1–2	2–0	2–1	—	1–0	4–2	1–1	2–1	0–0	1–0
Shelbourne	1–4	1–2	2–3	2–5	0–2	4–1	0–0	1–1	2–0	0–2	—	3–0	1–0	3–0	2–2	1–1
Sligo Rovers	1–0	0–1	2–1	2–0	0–3	0–3	3–1	3–4	0–2	0–3	1–0	—	1–3	3–1	4–1	2–1
St Patrick's Athletic	0–1	3–3	2–6	0–3	3–1	3–2	2–3	2–1	0–2	1–0	6–0	2–2	—	2–0	1–1	2–0
Thurles Town	0–3	0–3	0–2	1–0	1–4	3–1	2–1	1–3	3–5	2–3	1–0	2–5	5–0	—	1–1	0–1
UCD	1–2	1–2	3–1	2–2	0–1	1–1	2–0	3–0	0–4	0–0	4–2	1–3	2–1	3–3	—	0–1
Waterford	1–3	0–2	1–1	3–1	1–2	1–1	1–1	1–1	2–3	1–1	1–0	1–0	0–2	2–0	1–2	—

Legend: Blue = home team win; Yellow = draw; Red = away team win.

== Top scorers ==
Rank	Player	Club	Goals
1	Eugene Davis	Athlone Town	23
2	Brendan Bradley	Sligo Rovers	18
3	Mick Fairclough	Dundalk	16
3	Michael O'Connor	Athlone Town	16
5	Gary Hulmes	Limerick United	13
6	Derek Carthy	St Patrick's Athletic	12
6	Paul Nugent	Shelbourne (5); Drogheda United (7)	12
8	Liam Buckley	Shamrock Rovers	11
8	Leo Flanagan	Dundalk	11
8	Jim Mahon	St Patrick's Athletic	11
