= 1977–78 Tyler Cup =

Tournament details
- Country: Northern Ireland; Republic of Ireland
- Teams: 8

Final positions
- Champions: Shamrock Rovers (1st title)
- Runners-up: Finn Harps

Tournament statistics
- Matches played: 7
- Goals scored: 24 (3.43 per match)

The 1977–78 Tyler Cup was the inaugural edition of the Tyler Cup, an association football cup competition featuring teams from Northern Ireland and the Republic of Ireland.

Shamrock Rovers won the title, defeating Finn Harps 1–0 in the final.

== Results ==
=== Quarter-finals ===
Team 1	Score	Team 2
Cliftonville	2–2 (5–6 p)	Drogheda United
Finn Harps	5–5 (4–3 p)	Linfield
Glentoran	4–1	Bohemians
Shamrock Rovers	1–0	Glenavon

=== Semi-finals ===
Team 1	Score	Team 2
Glentoran	0–1	Finn Harps
Shamrock Rovers	1–1 (4–2 p)	Drogheda United

=== Final ===
17 May 1978

Shamrock Rovers	1–0	Finn Harps
Lynex 69'

Glenmalure Park, Dublin
Referee: T. Perry (Belfast)
