= Robert Murray (Irish footballer) =

Irish association footballer

Robert Murray (born in Belfast, Northern Ireland) was an Irish soccer player during the 1890s.

Murray was a fullback who captained the Bohemians F.C. from 1893 to 1898. He earned a runner-up medal in 1895, as the Bohemians were beaten by Linfield in the Irish Cup finals. He was more successful in the Leinster Senior Cup, as he picked up four first-place medals from 1894 to 1897. Murray also worked as a doctor.

Murray played alongside his brother, John Murray, who also practiced medicine.

Robert Murray died in 1906.

== Honours ==
- Leinster Senior Cup: 4
  - Bohemians: 1894, 1895, 1896, 1897
