= Tyler Cup =

All-Ireland football tournament

- Organiser(s): Irish Football Association; Football Association of Ireland
- Founded: 1978
- Abolished: 1980
- Region: Northern Ireland; Republic of Ireland
- Most championships: Shamrock Rovers; Athlone Town; Linfield (1 title each)

The Tyler Cup, also called the Tyler All-Ireland Cup, was an association football competition played between clubs in Northern Ireland and the Republic of Ireland. The competition ran from 1978 to 1980, and was similar to the earlier Blaxnit Cup, North-South Cup, Dublin and Belfast Intercity Cup, or the Setanta Sports Cup inaugurated in the 2000s.

== Format ==
The tournament began late in the 1977–78 season, before skipping a year and returning for the 1979–80 season. It ran again, for the last time, at the beginning of the 1980–81 season and was sponsored by a footwear company. The format for the first competition involved four teams from each country taking part in a knock-out first round, then semi-finals and a final. All ties were decided by a single match and the tournament was won by Shamrock Rovers. For the second and third seasons eight teams from each country took part. Again it was a knock-out with a first round, quarter-finals, semi-finals and a final. The final was over two legs but the preceding matches were all single ties. These two editions were won by Athlone Town and Linfield respectively.

== List of finals ==
Season	Winner (number of titles)	Score	Runner-up	Venue
1977–78	(Republic of Ireland) Shamrock Rovers (1)	1 – 0	(Republic of Ireland) Finn Harps	Glenmalure Park, Dublin
1978–79	Tournament not held
1979–80	(Republic of Ireland) Athlone Town (1)	2 – 0	(Republic of Ireland) Drogheda United	St Mel's Park, Athlone
1979–80	(Republic of Ireland) Athlone Town (1)	2 – 1 (3 – 2 agg.)	(Republic of Ireland) Drogheda United	United Park, Drogheda
1980–81	(Northern Ireland) Linfield (1)	0 – 0	(Republic of Ireland) Athlone Town	Windsor Park, Belfast
1980–81	(Northern Ireland) Linfield (1)	2 – 1 (2 – 1 agg.)	(Republic of Ireland) Athlone Town	St Mel's Park, Athlone
