= Joe Kendrick (footballer, born 1905) =

Irish footballer

Personal information
- Date of birth: 26 June 1905
- Place of birth: Ireland
- Date of death: 27 October 1965 (aged 60)
- Position: Outside left

Senior career*
Years	Team	Apps	(Gls)
1924–1925	Brooklyn F.C.		
1925–1926	Shelbourne		
1926–1928	Everton		
1928–1930	Shelbourne		
1930–1931	Bray Unknowns		
1931–1933	Shelbourne		
1933–1936	Dolphin		

International career
1924–1935	Irish Free State	5	(0)
- * Club domestic league appearances and goals

Joe Kendrick (26 June 1905 – 27 October 1965) was an Irish footballer who played for Brooklyn F.C., Everton and Dolphins. As an international he also played for the Irish Free State. In 1924 Kendrick was member of the Irish Free State team when it made its competitive debut at Olympic Games. In 1934 he was also a member of the first ever Free State team to play in a World Cup qualifier. His great nephew, Joe Kendrick Jr., also showed potential as a footballer and as youth was contracted to both Newcastle United and TSV 1860 Munich.

== Club career ==
When Kendrick represented the Irish Free State at the 1924 Olympic Games he was playing as an amateur for Brooklyn F.C. of the League of Ireland. At the beginning of the 1925–26 League of Ireland season he joined Shelbourne and was scouted on several occasions by Everton during this time. He then subsequently signed for Everton in December 1926 for a fee of £500 but failed to establish himself in their first team. He did, however, make one international appearance while an Everton player. He eventually returned to the League of Ireland, with two more spells at Shelbourne either side of a move to Bray Unknowns before later finding success for Dolphin, helping them win the League of Ireland title in 1935. Kendrick wound down his career playing in the Leinster Senior League for the Hospitals Trust.

== Irish international ==
Between 1924 and 1935 Kendrick made 5 appearances the Irish Free State. As a member of the squad that competed at the 1924 Olympic Games, he made his debut for the Free State against Bulgaria in their first ever senior international on 28 May. Other members of the team included Paddy Duncan, Tommy Muldoon and Dinny Hannon.

Kendrick made his second appearance in the 2–1 defeat to Italy B on 23 May 1927. Together with Mick O'Brien, Harry Duggan and Tommy Muldoon, he became one of the first four English League based players to play for the Irish Free State. However, Kendrick then had to wait nearly seven years before making his third appearance. On 25 February 1934 at Dalymount Park, together with Paddy Moore and Jimmy Kelly, he was a member of the Free State team that made its World Cup debut in a qualifier against Belgium. With the Free State trailing 4–3, in the 75th minute, a corner from Kelly was cleared only as far as Kendrick who then lobbed it towards Moore who then scored a dramatic equaliser. Two months later in another qualifier on 8 April 1934, Kendrick also played for the Free State in a 5–2 defeat against the Netherlands. He made his last international appearance, once again, against the Netherlands, in a 5–3 defeat on 8 December 1935.

== Honours ==
Dolphins

- League of Ireland: 1
  - 1934–35
- Dublin City Cup: 1
  - 1934–35
- League of Ireland Shield: 1
  - 1934–35

== Sources ==
- The Boys in Green – The FAI International Story (1997): Sean Ryan
