= John Murray (Irish footballer) =

Irish footballer

John Murray (born in Belfast) was an Irish soccer player during the 1890s.

Murray was a skilful winger who played for Bohemians. He earned a runners-up medal in 1895 as Bohs were beaten by Linfield in the Irish Cup Final. He was more successful in the Leinster Senior Cup and scored twice in the final of 1894 in a 3–0 win over Trinity. 2 years later, he netted in the final again as Bohs ran out 3-1 winners over Athlone. His brother Robert was captain of the club in those triumphs.

In those strictly amateur times, John had a profession outside football and was a doctor.

== Honours ==
- Leinster Senior Cup:
  - Bohemians - 1894, 1895, 1896, 1897
