= Mick Dalton =

Australian rugby league player

Personal information
- Full name: Harold Archibald Dalton
- Born: 3 December 1918 Ariah Park, NSW, Australia
- Died: 25 September 1943 (aged 24) New Guinea

Playing information
- Position: Hooker
Club
Years	Team	Pld	T	G	FG	P
1939–41	Eastern Suburbs	2	0	0	0	0

Harold Archibald "Mick" Dalton (3 December 1918 – 25 September 1943) was an Australian rugby league player.

== Biography ==
Born in Ariah Park, New South Wales, Dalton was an only son and lived in the Sydney suburb of Bronte. He played his rugby league as a hooker and featured in the Eastern Suburbs side that won the 1938 Presidents Cup competition. Considered small for his position, Dalton had limited first-grade opportunities as a result, but was a good in the open and a strong tackler. In addition to playing rugby league, Dalton was a member of the Bronte Surf Club.

Dalton was a Corporal with the 1st Beach Signals Section, AIF, during World War II. He died of wounds received while serving in New Guinea on 25 September 1943, at the age of 24.
