= St Mel's Park =

Football venue in Athlone, Ireland

St. Mel's Park
- Interactive map of St. Mel's Park
- Address: Athlone; Ireland
- Record attendance: 9,000 (vs AC Milan, 22 October 1975)

Construction
- Built: 1927–1929
- Opened: 1929

Tenants
- Athlone Town F.C (–2006)

St Mel's Park was an association football ground in Athlone and the former home of Athlone Town F.C. The club, who played at the venue until 2007, later vacated the ground when they moved into the Athlone Town Stadium. Built in 1929, St Mel's Park was named after Mél of Ardagh, a nephew of Saint Patrick. The stadium hosted the 1975–76 UEFA Cup tie between Athlone and AC Milan, which attracted 9,000 spectators and set the venue's record attendance.

Westmeath County Council assumed ownership of St Mel's Park as part of a land exchange between the local authority and the football club. The last senior game at St Mel's Park was a 2–2 draw between Athlone Town and Monaghan United which took place on 10 November 2006. The ground was sold to Marist College in April 2025.
