= Frank Ghent =

Irish footballer

Personal information
- Date of birth: 13 October 1897
- Place of birth: Athlone, Ireland
- Date of death: 21 October 1965 (aged 68)

International career
Years	Team	Apps	(Gls)
1924	Irish Free State	2	(2)

Frank Ghent (13 October 1897 – 21 October 1965) was an Irish footballer. He competed in the men's tournament at the 1924 Summer Olympics.
