= John Joe Dykes =

Irish footballer

Personal information
- Full name: John Joseph Dykes
- Date of birth: 30 October 1898
- Place of birth: Sligo, Ireland
- Date of death: 25 June 1976 (aged 77)
- Place of death: Sligo, Ireland
- Position: Defender

International career
Years	Team	Apps	(Gls)
1924	Irish Free State	3	(0)

John Joe Dykes (30 October 1898 – 25 June 1976) was an Irish footballer. He competed in the men's tournament at the 1924 Summer Olympics.
