= Paddy O'Reilly (footballer) =

Irish footballer

Personal information
- Date of birth: 1898
- Date of death: 24 September 1974 (aged 75–76)

International career
Years	Team	Apps	(Gls)
- Irish Free State

Paddy O'Reilly (1898 – 24 September 1974) was an Irish footballer. He competed in the men's tournament at the 1924 Summer Olympics.
