= 1975–76 UEFA Cup =

5th season of Europe's secondary club football tournament organised by UEFA

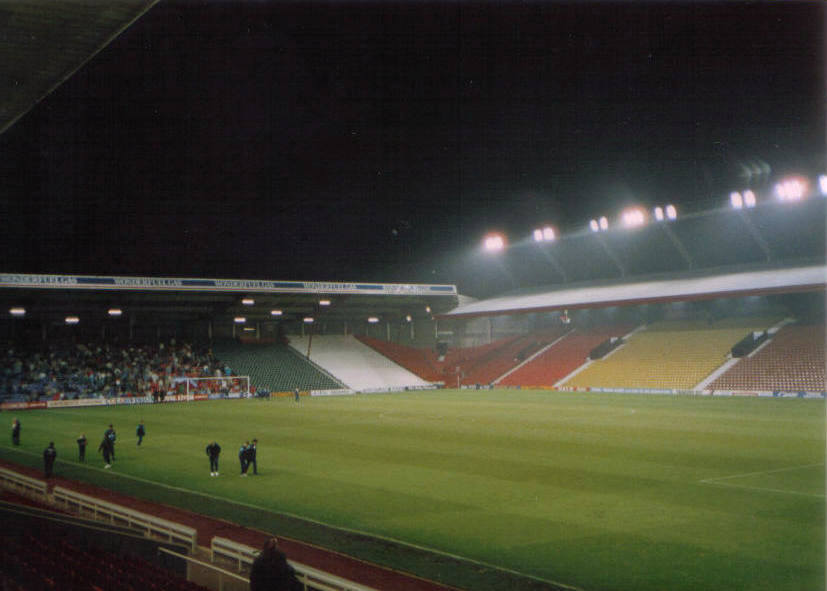
- Anfield hosted the first leg of the final.

Tournament details
- Dates: 14 September 1975 – 19 May 1976
- Teams: 64

Final positions
- Champions: (England) Liverpool (2nd title)
- Runners-up: (Belgium) Club Brugge

Tournament statistics
- Matches played: 126
- Goals scored: 384 (3.05 per match)
- Attendance: 2,744,090 (21,778 per match)
- Top scorer(s): Ruud Geels (Ajax); 10 goals

The 1975–76 UEFA Cup was the fifth season of the UEFA Cup, the third-tier club football competition organised by UEFA. The final was played over two legs at Anfield, Liverpool, England and at the Olympiastadion, Bruges, Belgium. It was won by Liverpool of England, who defeated Club Brugge of Belgium by an aggregate result of 4–3 to claim their second UEFA Cup title.

This was the first of only two times in the history of the UEFA Cup, its unofficial predecessor Inter-Cities Fairs Cup, or its successor UEFA Europa League when both finalists won their national championship in the same season. Until then, this had only happened twice in the European Cup, and it would only happen once in the European Cup Winners Cup.

Club Brugge was the first Belgian team to reach a UEFA Cup final, six years after Anderlecht also reached the final in the Inter-Cities Fairs Cup, its predecessor tournament. The final's first leg was the last major final held at Anfield in one of the three premier European club championships, although the stadium would also host two UEFA Super Cup legs in later finals.

== Association team allocation ==
A total of 64 teams from 31 UEFA member associations participate in the 1975–76 UEFA Cup. The original allocation scheme was as follows:

- 3 associations have four teams qualify.
- 3 associations have three teams qualify.
- 18 associations have two teams qualify.
- 7 associations have one team qualify.

The Soviet Union and Sweden were the two associations selected to have an extra third birth for this season, while the Netherlands and Austria went back to two qualified teams.

Associations in the 1975–76 UEFA Cup

Four teams
England
West Germany
Italy
Three teams
Soviet Union
Spain
Sweden

Two teams
Netherlands	East Germany	Scotland
Portugal	Belgium	Poland
(Socialist Federal Republic of Yugoslavia) Yugoslavia	Hungary	Czechoslovakia
Romania	Bulgaria	Greece
Turkey	France	Switzerland
Austria	Denmark	Norway

One team
Northern Ireland
Republic of Ireland
Malta
Finland
Luxembourg
Iceland
Cyprus

Did not compete
Wales
Albania

Wales: There was no national league in Wales before 1992 and the only competition organised by the Football Association of Wales was the Welsh Cup so Wales had just a single participant in European competitions, the winner (or best placed Welsh team as several English teams also competed) of the Welsh Cup which competed in the UEFA Cup Winners' Cup.
Albania: Albanian teams were absent from European competition from 1973 to 1978 due to the international isolation of the country during the communist rule of Enver Hoxha. Vllaznia would have qualified for the UEFA Cup by league position.

=== Teams ===
The labels in the parentheses show how each team qualified for competition:

- TH: Title holders
- CW: Cup winners
- CR: Cup runners-up
- LC: League Cup winners
- 2nd, 3rd, 4th, 5th, 6th, etc.: League position
- P-W: End-of-season European competition play-offs winners

Qualified teams for 1975–76 UEFA Cup
(England) Liverpool (2nd)	(England) Ipswich Town (3rd)	(England) Everton (4th)	(England) Aston Villa (LC)
(West Germany) Hertha BSC (2nd)	(West Germany) Hamburg (4th)	(West Germany) Köln (5th)	(West Germany) Duisburg (CR)
(Italy) Napoli (2nd)	(Italy) Roma (3rd)	(Italy) Lazio (4th)	(Italy) Milan (5th)
(Soviet Union) Spartak Moscow (2nd)	(Soviet Union) Chornomorets Odesa (3rd)	(Soviet Union) Torpedo Moscow (4th)	(Spain) Zaragoza (2nd)
(Spain) Barcelona (3rd)	(Spain) Real Sociedad (4th)	(Sweden) AIK (2nd)	(Sweden) Östers (3rd)
(Sweden) GAIS (4th)	(Netherlands) Feyenoord (2nd)	(Netherlands) Ajax (3rd)	(East Germany) Carl Zeiss Jena (2nd)
(East Germany) Dynamo Dresden (3rd)	(Scotland) Hibernian (2nd)	(Scotland) Dundee United (4th)	(Portugal) Porto (2nd)
(Portugal) Sporting CP (3rd)	(Belgium) Antwerp (2nd)	(Belgium) Club Brugge (4th)	(Poland) Stal Mielec (2nd)
(Poland) Śląsk Wrocław (3rd)	(Socialist Federal Republic of Yugoslavia) Vojvodina (2nd)	(Socialist Federal Republic of Yugoslavia) Red Star Belgrade (3rd)	(Hungary) Budapest Honvéd (2nd)
(Hungary) Vasas (LC)	(Czechoslovakia) Inter Bratislava (2nd)	(Czechoslovakia) Bohemians Prague (3rd)	(Romania) Târgu Mureș (2nd)
(Romania) Universitatea Craiova (3rd)	(Bulgaria) Levski Sofia (2nd)	(Bulgaria) Dunav Ruse (4th)	(Greece) AEK Athens (2nd)
(Greece) PAOK (3rd)	(Turkey) Galatasaray (2nd)	(Turkey) Eskişehirspor (3rd)	(France) Marseille (2nd)
(France) Lyon (3rd)	(Switzerland) Young Boys (2nd)	(Switzerland) Grasshoppers (4th)	(Austria) VÖEST Linz (2nd)
(Austria) Rapid Wien (3rd)	(Denmark) B1903 (3rd)	(Denmark) Holbæk (4th)	(Norway) Molde (2nd)
(Norway) Vålerenga (3rd)	(Northern Ireland) Glentoran (3rd)	(Republic of Ireland) Athlone Town (2nd)	(Malta) Sliema Wanderers (2nd)
(Finland) HJK Helsinki (3rd)	(Luxembourg) Avenir Beggen (2nd)	(Iceland) Keflavík (2nd)	(Cyprus) Enosis Neon Paralimni (2nd)

Notes

1. England: At the end of the 1974–75 Football League season in April, the Football Association still applied the old Inter-Cities Fairs Cup ruling of 'one city, one team' to determine the teams that qualified for the UEFA Cup. As a result, Everton was bypassed for the final English birth, as the city of Liverpool was already represented by second placed Liverpool, and Stoke City was nominated for the spot after finishing fifth. However, UEFA gave an ultimatum to the English Football League in order for teams to qualify without geographical limitations, warning that English teams would not be accepted in European competitions otherwise. On 7 June 1975, the EFL formally confirmed Everton as the recipient of the fourth UEFA Cup spot.
2. West Germany: The fourth UEFA Cup spot for West Germany was not awarded to the fourth best team not qualified for the European Cup or the European Cup Winners' Cup, which was Fortuna Dusseldorf, as it was common practice. Instead, this place was awarded to Duisburg, who had been runners-up in the 1974–75 DFB-Pokal.
3. Hungary: Vasas, who had finished 6th in the Hungarian league, qualified for the UEFA Cup by winning the Liberation Cup on its 30th anniversary. The tournament had not provided a European spot before, and would not do it ever since.

== Schedule ==
The schedule of the competition was as follows. Matches were scheduled for Wednesdays, though some matches took place on Tuesdays. In the first round, three first leg matches were played on a Thursday, and both legs of the match-up between MSV Duisburg and Enosis Neon Paralimni FC were played over three days in West Germany, with the first leg being held on a Sunday.

Schedule for 1975–76 UEFA Cup
Round	First leg	Second leg
First round	14–24 September 1975	16 September – 1 October 1975
Second round	21–22 October 1975	4–5 November 1975
Third round	26 November 1975	10 December 1975
Quarter-finals	3 March 1976	17 March 1976
Semi-finals	30–31 March 1976	14 April 1976
Final	28 April 1976	19 May 1976

== First round ==
Team 1	Agg.	Team 2	1st leg	2nd leg
MSV Duisburg (West Germany)	10–3	(Cyprus) Enosis Neon Paralimni	7–1	3–2
Glentoran (Northern Ireland)	1–14	(Netherlands) Ajax	1–6	0–8
Grasshoppers (Switzerland)	4–4 (a)	(Spain) Real Sociedad	3–3	1–1
PAOK (Greece)	2–6	(Spain) Barcelona	1–0	1–6
AIK (Sweden)	1–2	(Soviet Union) Spartak Moscow	1–1	0–1
Royal Antwerp (Belgium)	5–1	(England) Aston Villa	4–1	1–0
Bohemians Prague (Czechoslovakia)	2–3	(Hungary) Budapest Honvéd	1–2	1–1
Carl Zeiss Jena (East Germany)	4–0	(France) Marseille	3–0	1–0
Universitatea Craiova (Romania)	2–4	(Socialist Federal Republic of Yugoslavia) Red Star Belgrade	1–3	1–1
Everton (England)	0–1	(Italy) Milan	0–0	0–1
Feyenoord (Netherlands)	1–4	(England) Ipswich Town	1–2	0–2
GAIS (Sweden)	4–5	(Poland) Śląsk Wrocław	2–1	2–4
Hertha BSC (West Germany)	6–2	(Finland) HJK Helsinki	4–1	2–1
Hibernian (Scotland)	2–3	(England) Liverpool	1–0	1–3
Holbæk B&I (Denmark)	1–3	(Poland) Stal Mielec	0–1	1–2
Köln (West Germany)	5–2	(Denmark) B1903	2–0	3–2 (a.e.t.)
Lyon (France)	4–6	(Belgium) Club Brugge	4–3	0–3
Molde (Norway)	1–6	(Sweden) Öster	1–0	0–6
ASA Târgu Mureș (Romania)	3–6	(East Germany) Dynamo Dresden	2–2	1–4
Chornomorets Odesa (Soviet Union)	1–3	(Italy) Lazio	1–0	0–3 (a.e.t.)
Porto (Portugal)	10–0	(Luxembourg) Avenir Beggen	7–0	3–0
Rapid Wien (Austria)	2–3	(Turkey) Galatasaray	1–0	1–3
Roma (Italy)	2–1	(Bulgaria) Dunav Ruse	2–0	0–1
Torpedo Moscow (Soviet Union)	5–2	(Italy) Napoli	4–1	1–1
VÖEST Linz (Austria)	2–4	(Hungary) Vasas	2–0	0–4
Vojvodina (Socialist Federal Republic of Yugoslavia)	1–3	(Greece) AEK Athens	0–0	1–3
Young Boys (Switzerland)	2–4	(West Germany) Hamburg	0–0	2–4
Athlone Town (Republic of Ireland)	4–2	(Norway) Vålerengen	3–1	1–1
Inter Bratislava (Czechoslovakia)	8–2	(Spain) Zaragoza	5–0	3–2
Keflavík (Iceland)	0–6	(Scotland) Dundee United	0–2	0–4
Levski-Spartak Sofia (Bulgaria)	7–1	(Turkey) Eskişehirspor	3–0	4–1
Sliema Wanderers (Malta)	2–5	(Portugal) Sporting CP	1–2	1–3

=== First leg ===
14 September 1975

MSV Duisburg (West Germany)	7–1	(Cyprus) Enosis Neon Paralimni
Mertakas 3' (o.g.); Lehmann 16', 24', 25'; Worm 40', 87'; Thies 49'	Report	Chatzigiannis 11'

Wedaustadion, Duisburg
Attendance: 5,000
Referee: Albert Victor (Luxembourg)

16 September 1975

Glentoran (Northern Ireland)	1–6	(Netherlands) Ajax
Jamison 79'	Report	Geels 21', 26', 47', 76'; Meijer 29'; Notten 72'

The Oval, Belfast
Attendance: 4,000
Referee: Rafn Hjaltalin (Iceland)

16 September 1975

Grasshoppers (Switzerland)	3–3	(Spain) Real Sociedad
Elsener 24'; Santrač 27'; Bosco 62'	Report	Satrústegui 30', 32'; Murillo 65'

Hardturm, Zürich
Attendance: 6,600
Referee: Marijan Raus (Yugoslavia)

16 September 1975

PAOK (Greece)	1–0	(Spain) Barcelona
Koudas 72'	Report

Toumba Stadium, Thessaloniki
Attendance: 45,200
Referee: Nicolae Petriceanu (Romania)

17 September 1975

AIK (Sweden)	1–1	(Soviet Union) Spartak Moscow
Leback 58' (pen.)	Report	Lovchev 57'

Råsunda Stadium, Stockholm
Attendance: 1,107
Referee: Alistair McKenzie (Scotland)

17 September 1975

Royal Antwerp (Belgium)	4–1	(England) Aston Villa
Heyligen 26'; Kodat 32', 35', 43'	Report	Graydon 77'

Bosuilstadion, Antwerp
Attendance: 15,817
Referee: António Garrido (Portugal)

17 September 1975

Bohemians Prague (Czechoslovakia)	1–2	(Hungary) Budapest Honvéd
Mastník 86'	Report	Pintér 85'; Tóth 89'

Ďolíček, Prague
Attendance: 3,395
Referee: Franz Wöhrer (Austria)

17 September 1975

Carl Zeiss Jena (East Germany)	3–0	(France) Marseille
Sengewald 33', 35'; Kurbjuweit 47'	Report

Ernst-Abbe-Sportfeld, Jena
Attendance: 15,000
Referee: Walter Hungerbühler (Switzerland)

17 September 1975

Universitatea Craiova (Romania)	1–3	(Socialist Federal Republic of Yugoslavia) Red Star Belgrade
Oblemenco 44'	Report	Savić 17'; Filipović 54', 78'

Stadionul Central, Craiova
Attendance: 35,000
Referee: Eldar Azimzade (Soviet Union)

17 September 1975

Everton (England)	0–0	(Italy) Milan
	Report

Goodison Park, Liverpool
Attendance: 31,917
Referee: Alfred Delcourt (Belgium)

17 September 1975

Feyenoord (Netherlands)	1–2	(England) Ipswich Town
De Jong 68'	Report	Whymark 32'; Johnson 77'

De Kuip, Rotterdam
Attendance: 32,000
Referee: Vladimir Rudnev (Soviet Union)

17 September 1975

GAIS (Sweden)	2–1	(Poland) Śląsk Wrocław
Pålsson 9', 85' (pen.)	Report	Kwiatkowski 82'

Gamla Ullevi, Gothenburg
Attendance: 1,778
Referee: Gordon Kew (England)

17 September 1975

Hertha BSC (West Germany)	4–1	(Finland) HJK Helsinki
Kostedde 4', 56'; Horr 5', 23'	Report	Kangaskorpi 34'

Olympiastadion, Berlin
Attendance: 7,500
Referee: Norbert Rolles (Luxembourg)

17 September 1975

Hibernian (Scotland)	1–0	(England) Liverpool
Harper 19'	Report

Easter Road, Edinburgh
Attendance: 19,219
Referee: Frans Derks (Netherlands)

17 September 1975

Holbæk B&I (Denmark)	0–1	(Poland) Stal Mielec
	Report	Sekulski 76'

Holbæk Stadium, Holbæk
Attendance: 5,000
Referee: Svein-Inge Thime (Norway)

17 September 1975

Köln (West Germany)	2–0	(Denmark) B1903
Andersen 17' (o.g.); Löhr 25' (pen.)	Report

Müngersdorfer Stadion, Cologne
Attendance: 7,000
Referee: Ian Foote (Scotland)

17 September 1975

Lyon (France)	4–3	(Belgium) Club Brugge
Jodar 35'; Maillard 42', 66'; Mihajlović 87'	Report	Lambert 2'; Vandereycken 8', 80' (pen.)

Stade de Gerland, Lyon
Attendance: 19,088
Referee: Alberto Michelotti (Italy)

17 September 1975

Molde (Norway)	1–0	(Sweden) Öster
Westerdahl 70'	Report

Molde Stadion
Attendance: 3,000
Referee: Edgar Pedersen (Denmark)

17 September 1975

ASA Târgu Mureș (Romania)	2–2	(East Germany) Dynamo Dresden
Mureșan 10'; Fazekas 49'	Report	Schade 24'; Heidler 28'

Stadionul 23 August, Târgu Mureș
Attendance: 18,000
Referee: Efstathios Papavasiliou (Greece)

17 September 1975
19:00

Chornomorets Odesa (Soviet Union)	1–0	(Italy) Lazio
Doroshenko 33'	Report

Central CMP Stadium, Odessa
Attendance: 20,235
Referee: Ertuğrul Dilek (Turkey)

17 September 1975

Porto (Portugal)	7–0	(Luxembourg) Avenir Beggen
Júlio 10'; Cubillas 29' (pen.), 79', 82'; António Oliveira 60'; Machado 85'; Fernando Gomes 89'	Report

Estádio das Antas, Porto
Attendance: 35,000
Referee: Antonio Camacho Jiménez (Spain)

17 September 1975

Rapid Wien (Austria)	1–0	(Turkey) Galatasaray
Widmann 77'	Report

Ernst-Happel-Stadion, Vienna
Attendance: 7,948
Referee: Jan Kmeč (Czechoslovakia)

17 September 1975

Roma (Italy)	2–0	(Bulgaria) Dunav Ruse
Pellegrini 5'; Petrini 21'	Report

Stadio Olimpico, Rome
Attendance: 53,581
Referee: Thomas Reynolds (Wales)

17 September 1975

Torpedo Moscow (Soviet Union)	4–1	(Italy) Napoli
Grishin 2', 84'; Sakharov 30' (pen.); Belenkov 90'	Report	Savoldi 35'

Central Lenin Stadium, Moscow
Attendance: 27,000
Referee: Bob Matthewson (England)

17 September 1975

VÖEST Linz (Austria)	2–0	(Hungary) Vasas
Scharmann 34'; Stering 65'	Report

Linzer Stadion, Linz
Attendance: 4,317
Referee: Hilmi Ok (Turkey)

17 September 1975

Vojvodina (Socialist Federal Republic of Yugoslavia)	0–0	(Greece) AEK Athens
	Report

Karađorđe Stadium, Novi Sad
Attendance: 7,800
Referee: Heinz Einbeck (East Germany)

17 September 1975

Young Boys (Switzerland)	0–0	(West Germany) Hamburg
	Report

Wankdorf Stadium, Bern
Attendance: 17,173
Referee: Ángel Franco Martínez (Spain)

18 September 1975

Athlone Town (Republic of Ireland)	3–1	(Norway) Vålerengen
Martin 3'; Davis 66', 85'	Report	Olsen 10'

St. Mel's Park, Athlone
Attendance: 4,000
Referee: Koen Hoppenbrouwer (Netherlands)

18 September 1975

Inter Bratislava (Czechoslovakia)	5–0	(Spain) Zaragoza
Levický 16'; Jurkemik 57', 77'; Petráš 59'; Šajánek 83'	Report

Tehelné pole, Bratislava
Attendance: 7,870
Referee: Achille Verbecke (France)

23 September 1975

Keflavík (Iceland)	0–2	(Scotland) Dundee United
	Report	Narey 4', 43'

Keflavíkurvöllur, Keflavík
Attendance: 3,540
Referee: Eric Smyton (Northern Ireland)

18 September 1975

Levski-Spartak Sofia (Bulgaria)	3–0	(Turkey) Eskişehirspor
Spasov 15', 69'; Panov 58'	Report

Vasil Levski National Stadium, Sofia
Attendance: 13,215
Referee: Miloš Čajić (Yugoslavia)

24 September 1975

Sliema Wanderers (Malta)	1–2	(Portugal) Sporting CP
Azzopardi 66'	Report	Marinho 36'; Fernandes 89'

Empire Stadium, Gżira
Attendance: 4,500
Referee: Domenico Serafino (Italy)

=== Second leg ===
16 September 1975

Enosis Neon Paralimni (Cyprus)	2–3	(West Germany) MSV Duisburg
Konstantinou 19'; Mertakas 85'	Report	Dietz 16'; Krause 44'; Seliger 64'

Niederrheinstadion, Oberhausen
Attendance: 3,000
Referee: Marcel Hermann (Luxembourg)

Both legs were played in West Germany, MSV Duisburg won 10–3 on aggregate.

1 October 1975

Ajax (Netherlands)	8–0	(Northern Ireland) Glentoran
Notten 20'; Van Dord 25'; Geels 55', 59', 65'; Mühren 79'; Brokamp 81', 89'	Report

Olympic Stadium, Amsterdam
Attendance: 2,900
Referee: René Vigliani (France)

Ajax won 14–1 on aggregate.

1 October 1975

Real Sociedad (Spain)	1–1	(Switzerland) Grasshoppers
Urreisti 37'	Report	Santrač 79'

Atotxa Stadium, San Sebastián
Attendance: 11,192
Referee: José Baltasar (Portugal)

4–4 on aggregate; Real Sociedad won on away goals.

1 October 1975

Barcelona (Spain)	6–1	(Greece) PAOK
Neeskens 23' (pen.), 59' (pen.); Rexach 44', 64', 81'; Cruyff 54'	Report	Anastasiadis 77'

Camp Nou, Barcelona
Attendance: 32,708
Referee: Jack Taylor (England)

Barcelona won 6–2 on aggregate.

1 October 1975

Spartak Moscow (Soviet Union)	1–0	(Sweden) AIK
Andreyev 76'	Report

Luzhniki Stadium, Moscow
Attendance: 6,227
Referee: Rolf Nyhus (Norway)

Spartak Moscow won 2–1 on aggregate.

1 October 1975

Aston Villa (England)	0–1	(Belgium) Royal Antwerp
	Report	Kodat 18'

Villa Park, Birmingham
Attendance: 31,513
Referee: Günter Männig (East Germany)

Royal Antwerp won 5–1 on aggregate.

1 October 1975

Budapest Honvéd (Hungary)	1–1	(Czechoslovakia) Bohemians Prague
Kocsis 23' (pen.)	Report	Panenka 34'

Ferenc Puskás Stadium, Budapest
Attendance: 9,496
Referee: Atanas Mateev (Bulgaria)

Budapest Honvéd won 3–2 on aggregate.

1 October 1975

Marseille (France)	0–1	(East Germany) Carl Zeiss Jena
	Report	Irmscher 45'

Stade Vélodrome, Marseille
Attendance: 19,550
Referee: John Wright Paterson (Scotland)

Carl Zeiss Jena won 4–0 on aggregate.

1 October 1975

Red Star Belgrade (Socialist Federal Republic of Yugoslavia)	1–1	(Romania) Universitatea Craiova
Filipović 32' (pen.)	Report	Crișan 79'

Red Star Stadium, Belgrade
Attendance: 10,812
Referee: Mihály Halász (Hungary)

Red Star Belgrade won 4–2 on aggregate.

1 October 1975

Milan (Italy)	1–0	(England) Everton
Calloni 68' (pen.)	Report

San Siro, Milan
Attendance: 35,825
Referee: Rudi Glöckner (East Germany)

Milan won 1–0 on aggregate.

1 October 1975

Ipswich Town (England)	2–0	(Netherlands) Feyenoord
Woods 7'; Whymark 40'	Report

Portman Road, Ipswich
Attendance: 30,411
Referee: Erich Linemayr (Austria)

Ipswich Town won 4–1 on aggregate.

1 October 1975

Śląsk Wrocław (Poland)	4–2	(Sweden) GAIS
Sybis 23', 41', 73'; Pawłowski 85'	Report	Johansson 14', 80'

Stadion Olimpijski, Wrocław
Attendance: 8,000
Referee: Nikolaos Zlatanos (Greece)

Śląsk Wrocław won 5–4 on aggregate.

1 October 1975

HJK Helsinki (Finland)	1–2	(West Germany) Hertha BSC
Salo 2'	Report	Sidka 47'; Grau 50'

Helsinki Olympic Stadium, Helsinki
Attendance: 2,700
Referee: Jerzy Świstek (Poland)

Hertha BSC won 6–2 on aggregate.

30 September 1975

Liverpool (England)	3–1	(Scotland) Hibernian
Toshack 21', 54', 64'	Report	Edwards 33'

Anfield, Liverpool
Attendance: 29,963
Referee: Ferdinand Biwersi (West Germany)

Liverpool won 3–2 on aggregate.

1 October 1975

Stal Mielec (Poland)	2–1	(Denmark) Holbæk B&I
Karaś 18'; Krawczyk 54'	Report	Hansen 47'

Stadion Miejski, Mielec
Attendance: 20,000
Referee: Werner Spiegl (Austria)

Stal Mielec won 3–1 on aggregate.

1 October 1975

B1903 (Denmark)	2–3 (a.e.t.)	(West Germany) Köln
Kristiansen 14', 65'	Report	Brücken 96', 110', 119'

Gentofte Sportspark, Gentofte
Attendance: 2,141
Referee: Dominic Byrne (Republic of Ireland)

Köln won 5–2 on aggregate.

1 October 1975

Club Brugge (Belgium)	3–0	(France) Lyon
Vandereycken 57'; Valette 63' (o.g.); Chiesa 75' (o.g.)	Report

Jan Breydel Stadium, Bruges
Attendance: 18,000
Referee: John Gordon (Scotland)

Club Brugge won 6–4 on aggregate.

1 October 1975

Öster (Sweden)	6–0	(Norway) Molde
Svensson 32'; Mattsson 60', 82'; Evesson 67'; Ejderstedt 75'; Isaxon 90'	Report

Värendsvallen, Växjö
Attendance: 2,145
Referee: Olavi Peltola (Finland)

Öster won 6–1 on aggregate.

1 October 1975

Dynamo Dresden (East Germany)	4–1	(Romania) ASA Târgu Mureș
Heidler 16', 67', 82'; Kreische 87'	Report	Mureșan 76'

Dynamo-Stadion, Dresden
Attendance: 27,000
Referee: Nikola Dudin (Bulgaria)

Dynamo Dresden won 6–3 on aggregate.

1 October 1975
20:30

Lazio (Italy)	3–0 (a.e.t.)	(Soviet Union) Chornomorets Odesa
Chinaglia 89' (pen.), 102', 120'	Report

Stadio Olimpico, Rome
Attendance: 46,038
Referee: Károly Palotai (Hungary)

Lazio won 3–1 on aggregate.

1 October 1975

Avenir Beggen (Luxembourg)	0–3	(Portugal) Porto
	Report	Júlio 10'; Grilli 44' (o.g.); Seninho 76'

Stade Municipal, Luxembourg City
Attendance: 3,264
Referee: Theo Boosten (Netherlands)

Porto won 10–0 on aggregate.

1 October 1975

Galatasaray (Turkey)	3–1	(Austria) Rapid Wien
Şenlen 36'; Özdenak 56', 87'	Report	Krankl 60'

BJK İnönü Stadium, Istanbul
Attendance: 26,071
Referee: Jean Dubach (Switzerland)

Galatasaray won 3–2 on aggregate.

1 October 1975

Dunav Ruse (Bulgaria)	1–0	(Italy) Roma
Ivanov 63'	Report

Gradski stadion, Ruse
Attendance: 12,369
Referee: Sotos Afxentiou (Cyprus)

Roma won 2–1 on aggregate.

1 October 1975

Napoli (Italy)	1–1	(Soviet Union) Torpedo Moscow
Braglia 37'	Report	Filatov 15'

Stadio San Paolo, Naples
Attendance: 66,231
Referee: Walter Hungerbühler (Switzerland)

Torpedo Moscow won 5–2 on aggregate.

1 October 1975

Vasas (Hungary)	4–0	(Austria) VÖEST Linz
Várady 8', 41'; Kovács 35'; Izsó 51'	Report

Népstadion, Budapest
Attendance: 12,000
Referee: Jan Redelfs (West Germany)

Vasas SC won 4–2 on aggregate.

1 October 1975

AEK Athens (Greece)	3–1	(Socialist Federal Republic of Yugoslavia) Vojvodina
Papaioannou 41'; Papadopoulos 60'; Wagner 71'	Report	Rutonjski 89'

AEK Stadium, Nea Filadelfeia
Attendance: 27,541
Referee: Pavel Kazakov (Soviet Union)

AEK Athens won 3–1 on aggregate.

1 October 1975

Hamburg (West Germany)	4–2	(Switzerland) Young Boys
Reimann 15'; Bertl 50', 67'; Bjørnmose 85'	Report	Siegenthaler 65', 87'

Volksparkstadion, Hamburg
Attendance: 29,199
Referee: Pat Partridge (England)

Hamburg won 4–2 on aggregate.

1 October 1975

Vålerengen (Norway)	1–1	(Republic of Ireland) Athlone Town
Olavson 55'	Report	Martin 19'

Bislett, Oslo
Attendance: 747
Referee: Sven Jonsson (Sweden)

Athlone Town won 4–2 on aggregate.

1 October 1975

Zaragoza (Spain)	2–3	(Czechoslovakia) Inter Bratislava
González 24' (pen.); Arrúa 40'	Report	Jurkemik 10'; Petráš 50'; Mráz 75'

La Romareda, Zaragoza
Attendance: 10,141
Referee: Jan Peeters (Belgium)

Inter Bratislava won 8–2 on aggregate.

30 September 1975

Dundee United (Scotland)	4–0	(Iceland) Keflavík
Hall 29', 85'; Hegarty 58' (pen.); Sturrock 66'	Report

Tannadice Park, Dundee
Attendance: 4,500
Referee: Rolf Eriksson (Sweden)

Dundee United won 6–0 on aggregate.

1 October 1975

Eskişehirspor (Turkey)	1–4	(Bulgaria) Levski-Spartak Sofia
Kalaycı 44'	Report	Spasov 7', 12'; Panov 30'; Milanov 44'

Eskişehir Atatürk Stadium, Eskişehir
Attendance: 6,230
Referee: Riccardo Lattanzi (Italy)

Levski-Spartak Sofia won 7–1 on aggregate.

1 October 1975

Sporting CP (Portugal)	3–1	(Malta) Sliema Wanderers
Baltasar 39'; Da Costa 50'; Fernandes 84' (pen.)	Report	Fabri 44'

Estádio José Alvalade, Lisbon
Attendance: 10,780
Referee: Achille Verbecke (France)

Sporting CP won 5–2 on aggregate.

== Second round ==
Team 1	Agg.	Team 2	1st leg	2nd leg
MSV Duisburg (West Germany)	4–4 (a)	(Bulgaria) Levski-Spartak Sofia	3–2	1–2
Athlone Town (Republic of Ireland)	0–3	(Italy) Milan	0–0	0–3
Carl Zeiss Jena (East Germany)	1–1 (2–3 p)	(Poland) Stal Mielec	1–0	0–1 (a.e.t.)
Dundee United (Scotland)	2–3	(Portugal) Porto	1–2	1–1
Galatasaray (Turkey)	2–7	(Soviet Union) Torpedo Moscow	2–4	0–3
Hertha BSC (West Germany)	2–4	(Netherlands) Ajax	1–0	1–4
Budapest Honvéd (Hungary)	2–3	(East Germany) Dynamo Dresden	2–2	0–1
Inter Bratislava (Czechoslovakia)	3–3 (a)	(Greece) AEK Athens	2–0	1–3
Ipswich Town (England)	3–4	(Belgium) Club Brugge	3–0	0–4
Spartak Moscow (Soviet Union)	3–0	(West Germany) Köln	2–0	1–0
Öster (Sweden)	1–2	(Italy) Roma	1–0	0–2
Real Sociedad (Spain)	1–9	(England) Liverpool	1–3	0–6
Red Star Belgrade (Socialist Federal Republic of Yugoslavia)	1–5	(West Germany) Hamburg	1–1	0–4
Śląsk Wrocław (Poland)	3–2	(Belgium) Royal Antwerp	1–1	2–1
Vasas (Hungary)	4–3	(Portugal) Sporting CP	3–1	1–2
Lazio (Italy)	0–7	(Spain) Barcelona	0–3	0–4

=== First leg ===
21 October 1975

MSV Duisburg (West Germany)	3–2	(Bulgaria) Levski-Spartak Sofia
Schneider 17'; Worm 73'; Krause 90+1'	Report	Panov 11', 31'

Wedaustadion, Duisburg
Attendance: 18,000
Referee: Francisco Lobo (Portugal)

22 October 1975

Athlone Town (Republic of Ireland)	0–0	(Italy) Milan
	Report

St Mel's Park, Athlone
Attendance: 5,874
Referee: Henning Lund-Sørensen (Denmark)

22 October 1975

Carl Zeiss Jena (East Germany)	1–0	(Poland) Stal Mielec
Kurbjuweit 80'	Report

Ernst-Abbe-Sportfeld, Jena
Attendance: 13,000
Referee: Zdeněk Jelínek (Czechoslovakia)

22 October 1975

Dundee United (Scotland)	1–2	(Portugal) Porto
Rennie 67'	Report	António Oliveira 34'; Seninho 74'

Tannadice Park, Dundee
Attendance: 7,500
Referee: Svein-Inge Thime (Norway)

22 October 1975

Galatasaray (Turkey)	2–4	(Soviet Union) Torpedo Moscow
Özgül 55'; Şenlen 57'	Report	Ürekli 12' (o.g.); Khrabrostin 29', 82'; Sakharov 60' (pen.)

BJK İnönü Stadium, Istanbul
Attendance: 35,994
Referee: Alberto Michelotti (Italy)

22 October 1975

Hertha BSC (West Germany)	1–0	(Netherlands) Ajax
Kostedde 49'	Report

Olympiastadion, Berlin
Attendance: 54,584
Referee: Sergio Gonella (Italy)

22 October 1975

Budapest Honvéd (Hungary)	2–2	(East Germany) Dynamo Dresden
Weimper 67', 80'	Report	Heidler 32', 41'

Népstadion, Budapest
Attendance: 12,350
Referee: Michal Jursa (Czechoslovakia)

22 October 1975

Inter Bratislava (Czechoslovakia)	2–0	(Greece) AEK Athens
Luprich 36' (pen.); Mráz 81'	Report

Tehelné pole, Bratislava
Attendance: 8,120
Referee: John Gordon (Scotland)

22 October 1975

Ipswich Town (England)	3–0	(Belgium) Club Brugge
Gates 20'; Peddelty 55'; Austin 66'	Report

Portman Road, Ipswich
Attendance: 28,617
Referee: Adolf Prokop (East Germany)

22 October 1975

Spartak Moscow (Soviet Union)	2–0	(West Germany) Köln
Lovchev 16', 89'	Report

Luzhniki Stadium, Moscow
Attendance: 8,423
Referee: Ulf Eriksson (Sweden)

22 October 1975

Öster (Sweden)	1–0	(Italy) Roma
Evesson 27'	Report

Värendsvallen, Växjö
Attendance: 10,196
Referee: Marian Kustoń (Poland)

22 October 1975

Real Sociedad (Spain)	1–3	(England) Liverpool
Amas 87'	Report	Heighway 18'; Callaghan 60'; Thompson 83'

Atotxa Stadium, San Sebastián
Attendance: 16,256
Referee: Franz Wöhrer (Austria)

22 October 1975

Red Star Belgrade (Socialist Federal Republic of Yugoslavia)	1–1	(West Germany) Hamburg
Sušić 23'	Report	Bjørnmose 24'

Red Star Stadium, Belgrade
Attendance: 17,137
Referee: Paul Schiller (Austria)

22 October 1975

Śląsk Wrocław (Poland)	1–1	(Belgium) Royal Antwerp
Pawłowski 38'	Report	Houwaart 50'

Stadion Olimpijski, Wrocław
Attendance: 12,000
Referee: Josef Bucek (Austria)

22 October 1975

Vasas SC (Hungary)	3–1	(Portugal) Sporting CP
Kovács 63', 79'; Várady 86' (pen.)	Report	Faria 69'

Népstadion, Budapest
Attendance: 12,350
Referee: John Wright Paterson (Scotland)

22 October 1975

Lazio (Italy)	0–3	(Spain) Barcelona
	Report

Stadio Olimpico, Rome

Lazio refused to play for security reasons, claiming it would be impossible to play due to political demonstrations following the execution in Spain of five ETA and FRAP members on 27 September on terrorism charges. UEFA awarded Barcelona a 3–0 victory, ruling those three goals were not applicable for the away goals rule.

=== Second leg ===
4 November 1975

Levski-Spartak Sofia (Bulgaria)	2–1	(West Germany) MSV Duisburg
Ivkov 49'; Panov 83' (pen.)	Report	Worm 59'

Vasil Levski National Stadium, Sofia
Attendance: 35,973
Referee: Tony Briguglio (Malta)

4–4 on aggregate; Levski-Spartak Sofia won on away goals.

5 November 1975

Milan (Italy)	3–0	(Republic of Ireland) Athlone Town
Vincenzi 63'; Benetti 70', 77' (pen.)	Report

San Siro, Milan
Attendance: 42,804
Referee: Constantin Ghiță (Romania)

Milan won 3–0 on aggregate.

5 November 1975

Stal Mielec (Poland)	1–0 (a.e.t.)	(East Germany) Carl Zeiss Jena
Karaś 80'	Report
Penalties
Sekulski (penalty missed); Per (penalty scored); Kasperczak (penalty scored); Krawczyk (penalty missed); Lato (penalty scored)	3–2	(penalty missed) Vogel; (penalty scored) Kurbjuweit; (penalty missed) Schlutter; (penalty scored) Schröder; (penalty missed) Irmscher

Stadion Miejski, Mielec
Attendance: 21,000
Referee: Lajos Somlai (Hungary)

1–1 on aggregate; Stal Mielec won on penalties.

5 November 1975

Porto (Portugal)	1–1	(Scotland) Dundee United
Seninho 70'	Report	Hegarty 65'

Estádio das Antas, Porto
Attendance: 23,117
Referee: Ferdinand Biwersi (West Germany)

Porto won 3–2 on aggregate.

5 November 1975

Torpedo Moscow (Soviet Union)	3–0	(Turkey) Galatasaray
Degtyaryov 27'; Sakharov 68' (pen.); Buturlakin 74'	Report

Central Lenin Stadium, Moscow
Attendance: 4,798
Referee: Olavi Peltola (Finland)

Torpedo Moscow won 7–2 on aggregate.

5 November 1975

Ajax (Netherlands)	4–1	(West Germany) Hertha BSC
Brokamp 24', 76'; Geels 28' (pen.); Meijer 85'	Report	Kostedde 41'

Olympic Stadium, Amsterdam
Attendance: 37,700
Referee: Ernst Dörflinger (Switzerland)

Ajax won 4–2 on aggregate.

5 November 1975
17:30

Dynamo Dresden (East Germany)	1–0	(Hungary) Budapest Honvéd
Dörner 25' (pen.)	Report

Rudolf-Harbig-Stadion, Dresden
Attendance: 33,678
Referee: Pavel Kazakov (Soviet Union)

Dynamo Dresden won 3–2 on aggregate.

5 November 1975

AEK Athens (Greece)	3–1	(Czechoslovakia) Inter Bratislava
Konstantinou 58', 60' (pen.); Wagner 74'	Report	Novotný 1'

AEK Stadium, Nea Filadelfeia
Attendance: 25,023
Referee: Milivoje Gugulović (Yugoslavia)

3–3 on aggregate; Inter Bratislava won on away goals.

5 November 1975

Club Brugge (Belgium)	4–0	(England) Ipswich Town
Lambert 11' (pen.); De Cubber 25'; le Fevre 40'; Vandereycken 87'	Report

Jan Breydel Stadium, Bruges
Attendance: 26,000
Referee: César Correia (Portugal)

Club Brugge won 4–3 on aggregate.

5 November 1975

Köln (West Germany)	0–1	(Soviet Union) Spartak Moscow
	Report	Andreyev 62'

Müngersdorfer Stadion, Cologne
Attendance: 23,000
Referee: Antonio Camacho Jiménez (Spain)

Spartak Moscow won 3–0 on aggregate.

5 November 1975

Roma (Italy)	2–0	(Sweden) Öster
Pellegrini 5'; Boni 49'	Report

Stadio Olimpico, Rome
Attendance: 42,804
Referee: Paul Bonett (Malta)

Roma won 2–1 on aggregate.

4 November 1975

Liverpool (England)	6–0	(Spain) Real Sociedad
Toshack 15'; Kennedy 30', 74'; Fairclough 72'; Heighway 76'; Neal 79'	Report

Anfield, Liverpool
Attendance: 23,796
Referee: Rolf Nyhus (Norway)

Liverpool won 9–1 on aggregate.

5 November 1975

Hamburg (West Germany)	4–0	(Socialist Federal Republic of Yugoslavia) Red Star Belgrade
Reimann 14', 90'; Ettmayer 78'; Memering 82'	Report

Volksparkstadion, Hamburg
Attendance: 61,300
Referee: Charles Corver (Netherlands)

Hamburg won 5–1 on aggregate.

5 November 1975

Royal Antwerp (Belgium)	1–2	(Poland) Śląsk Wrocław
De Schrijver 52'	Report	Sybis 36'; Pawłowski 41'

Bosuilstadion, Antwerp
Attendance: 12,246
Referee: Alistair McKenzie (Scotland)

Śląsk Wrocław won 3–2 on aggregate.

5 November 1975

Sporting CP (Portugal)	2–1	(Hungary) Vasas
Fernandes 32', 70'	Report	Gass 76'

Estádio José Alvalade, Lisbon
Attendance: 35,169
Referee: Roland Racine (Switzerland)

Vasas SC won 4–3 on aggregate.

5 November 1975

Barcelona (Spain)	4–0	(Italy) Lazio
Sotil 6'; Cruyff 43'; Neeskens 79'; Fortes 82'	Report

Camp Nou, Barcelona
Attendance: 29,238
Referee: René Vigliani (France)

Before the game, Johan Cruyff was given his Ballon d'Or award for the 1974 season.

Barcelona won 7–0 on aggregate.

== Third round ==
Team 1	Agg.	Team 2	1st leg	2nd leg
Ajax (Netherlands)	3–3 (3–5 p)	(Bulgaria) Levski-Spartak Sofia	2–1	1–2 (a.e.t.)
Barcelona (Spain)	4–1	(Hungary) Vasas	3–1	1–0
Club Brugge (Belgium)	2–0	(Italy) Roma	1–0	1–0
Dynamo Dresden (East Germany)	4–3	(Soviet Union) Torpedo Moscow	3–0	1–3
Hamburg (West Germany)	3–2	(Portugal) Porto	2–0	1–2
Inter Bratislava (Czechoslovakia)	1–2	(Poland) Stal Mielec	1–0	0–2
Śląsk Wrocław (Poland)	1–5	(England) Liverpool	1–2	0–3
Milan (Italy)	4–2	(Soviet Union) Spartak Moscow	4–0	0–2

=== First leg ===
26 November 1975

Ajax (Netherlands)	2–1	(Bulgaria) Levski-Spartak Sofia
Geels 33'; Steffenhagen 76'	Report	Voynov 85'

Olympic Stadium, Amsterdam
Attendance: 23,769
Referee: Pedro María Urrestarazu Elordi (Spain)

26 November 1975

Barcelona (Spain)	3–1	(Hungary) Vasas
Migueli 16'; Rexach 37'; Neeskens 39'	Report	Müller 26'

Camp Nou, Barcelona
Attendance: 26,317
Referee: Clive Thomas (Wales)

26 November 1975

Club Brugge (Belgium)	1–0	(Italy) Roma
Cools 42'	Report

Jan Breydel Stadium, Bruges
Attendance: 26,930
Referee: Milivoje Gugulović (Yugoslavia)

26 November 1975

Dynamo Dresden (East Germany)	3–0	(Soviet Union) Torpedo Moscow
Riedel 30', 75'; Kreische 89'	Report

Rudolf-Harbig-Stadion, Dresden
Attendance: 22,405
Referee: John Gordon (Scotland)

26 November 1975

Hamburg (West Germany)	2–0	(Portugal) Porto
Murça 15' (o.g.); Volkert 89' (pen.)	Report

Volksparkstadion, Hamburg
Attendance: 42,184
Referee: Lajos Somlai (Hungary)

26 November 1975

Inter Bratislava (Czechoslovakia)	1–0	(Poland) Stal Mielec
Šajánek 69'	Report

Tehelné pole, Bratislava
Attendance: 5,000
Referee: Rudi Glöckner (East Germany)

26 November 1975

Śląsk Wrocław (Poland)	1–2	(England) Liverpool
Pawłowski 79'	Report	Faber 60' (o.g.); Toshack 73'

Stadion Olimpijski, Wrocław
Attendance: 43,000
Referee: Hilmi Ok (Turkey)

26 November 1975

Milan (Italy)	4–0	(Soviet Union) Spartak Moscow
Calloni 19', 71'; Bigon 48'; Maldera 51'	Report

San Siro, Milan
Attendance: 16,290
Referee: Roland Racine (Switzerland)

=== Second leg ===
10 December 1975

Levski-Spartak Sofia (Bulgaria)	2–1 (a.e.t.)	(Netherlands) Ajax
Panov 28', 71'	Report	Geels 55'
Penalties
Tishanski (penalty scored); Panov (penalty scored); Milanov (penalty scored); Borisov (penalty scored); Yordanov (penalty scored)	5–3	(penalty scored) Geels; (penalty scored) Krol; (penalty missed) Helling; (penalty scored) Notten

Vasil Levski National Stadium, Sofia
Attendance: 47,767
Referee: Paul Schiller (Austria)

3–3 on aggregate; Levski-Spartak Sofia won on penalties.

10 December 1975

Vasas (Hungary)	0–1	(Spain) Barcelona
	Report	Fortes 15'

Népstadion, Budapest
Attendance: 28,280
Referee: Alfred Delcourt (Belgium)

Barcelona won 4–1 on aggregate.

10 December 1975

Roma (Italy)	0–1	(Belgium) Club Brugge
	Report	Lambert 69'

Stadio Olimpico, Rome
Attendance: 36,796
Referee: Ferdinand Biwersi (West Germany)

Club Brugge won 2–0 on aggregate.

10 December 1975

Torpedo Moscow (Soviet Union)	3–1	(East Germany) Dynamo Dresden
Degtyaryov 17'; Petrenko 23', 81'	Report	Heidler 70'

Lokomotiv Republican Sports Complex, Simferopol
Attendance: 18,707
Referee: Leo van der Kroft (Netherlands)

Dynamo Dresden won 4–3 on aggregate.

10 December 1975

Porto (Portugal)	2–1	(West Germany) Hamburg
Júlio 31'; Cubillas 72'	Report	Reimann 29'

Estádio das Antas, Porto
Attendance: 21,582
Referee: Robert Wurtz (France)

Hamburg won 3–2 on aggregate.

10 December 1975

Stal Mielec (Poland)	2–0	(Czechoslovakia) Inter Bratislava
Sekulski 75'; Karaś 85'	Report

Stadion Miejski, Mielec
Attendance: 25,000
Referee: Nikola Dudin (Bulgaria)

Stal Mielec won 2–1 on aggregate.

10 December 1975

Liverpool (England)	3–0	(Poland) Śląsk Wrocław
Case 22', 29', 46'	Report

Anfield, Liverpool
Attendance: 17,886
Referee: Cesare Gussoni (Italy)

Liverpool won 5–1 on aggregate.

10 December 1975

Spartak Moscow (Soviet Union)	2–0	(Italy) Milan
Papayev 60'; Lovchev 84'	Report

Sochi Central Stadium, Sochi
Attendance: 14,500
Referee: Bob Matthewson (England)

Milan won 4–2 on aggregate.

== Quarter-finals ==
Team 1	Agg.	Team 2	1st leg	2nd leg
Barcelona (Spain)	8–5	(Bulgaria) Levski-Spartak Sofia	4–0	4–5
Club Brugge (Belgium)	3–2	(Italy) Milan	2–0	1–2
Dynamo Dresden (East Germany)	1–2	(England) Liverpool	0–0	1–2
Hamburg (West Germany)	2–1	(Poland) Stal Mielec	1–1	1–0

=== First leg ===
3 March 1976

Barcelona (Spain)	4–0	(Bulgaria) Levski-Spartak Sofia
Neeskens 38'; Marcial 44'; Asensi 80'; Heredia 89'	Report

Camp Nou, Barcelona
Attendance: 45,000
Referee: Jean Dubach (Switzerland)

3 March 1976

Club Brugge (Belgium)	2–0	(Italy) Milan
Le Fevre 5'; Krieger 62'	Report

Olympiastadion, Bruges
Attendance: 28,686
Referee: René Vigliani (France)

3 March 1976

Dynamo Dresden (East Germany)	0–0	(England) Liverpool
	Report

Rudolf-Harbig-Stadion, Dresden
Attendance: 32,182
Referee: Alfred Delcourt (Belgium)

3 March 1976

Hamburg (West Germany)	1–1	(Poland) Stal Mielec
Bertl 11'	Report	Oratowski 46'

Volksparkstadion, Hamburg
Attendance: 34,262
Referee: Anatoli Ivanov (Soviet Union)

=== Second leg ===
17 March 1976

Levski-Spartak Sofia (Bulgaria)	5–4	(Spain) Barcelona
Panov 8', 89' (pen.); Yordanov 10', 87'; Spasov 48'	Report	Marcial 33'; Asensi 45'; Heredia 57'; Neeskens 64' (pen.)

Vasil Levski National Stadium, Sofia
Attendance: 55,000
Referee: Ken Burns (England)

Barcelona won 8–5 on aggregate.

17 March 1976

Milan (Italy)	2–1	(Belgium) Club Brugge
Bigon 31'; Chiarugi 65'	Report	Sanders 74'

San Siro, Milan
Attendance: 44,570
Referee: Alistair MacKenzie (Scotland)

Club Brugge won 3–2 on aggregate.

17 March 1976

Liverpool (England)	2–1	(East Germany) Dynamo Dresden
Case 24'; Keegan 47'	Report	Heidler 63'

Anfield, Liverpool
Attendance: 39,300
Referee: Robert Wurtz (France)

Liverpool won 2–1 on aggregate.

17 March 1976

Stal Mielec (Poland)	0–1	(West Germany) Hamburg
	Report	Nogly 17'

Stadion Miejski, Mielec
Attendance: 23,385
Referee: Walter Hungerbühler (Switzerland)

Hamburg won 2–1 on aggregate.

== Semi-finals ==
Team 1	Agg.	Team 2	1st leg	2nd leg
Barcelona (Spain)	1–2	(England) Liverpool	0–1	1–1
Hamburg (West Germany)	1–2	(Belgium) Club Brugge	1–1	0–1

=== First leg ===
30 March 1976

Barcelona (Spain)	0–1	(England) Liverpool
	Report	Toshack 13'

Camp Nou, Barcelona
Attendance: 49,572
Referee: Paul Schiller (Austria)

31 March 1976

Hamburg (West Germany)	1–1	(Belgium) Club Brugge
Reimann 77'	Report	Lambert 48'

Volksparkstadion, Hamburg
Attendance: 49,000
Referee: Károly Palotai (Hungary)

=== Second leg ===
14 April 1976

Liverpool (England)	1–1	(Spain) Barcelona
Thompson 51'	Report	Rexach 52'

Anfield, Liverpool
Attendance: 55,102
Referee: Riccardo Lattanzi (Italy)

Liverpool won 2–1 on aggregate.

14 April 1976

Club Brugge (Belgium)	1–0	(West Germany) Hamburg
Kaltz 85' (o.g.)	Report

Jan Breydel Stadium, Bruges
Attendance: 29,458
Referee: Bobby Davidson (Scotland)

Club Brugge won 2–1 on aggregate.

== Final ==
=== First leg ===
28 April 1976

Liverpool (England)	3–2	(Belgium) Club Brugge
Kennedy 60'; Case 62'; Keegan 65' (pen.)	Report	Lambert 5'; Cools 15'

Anfield, Liverpool
Attendance: 50,188
Referee: Ferdinand Biwersi (West Germany)

=== Second leg ===
19 May 1976

Club Brugge (Belgium)	1–1	(England) Liverpool
Lambert 11' (pen.)	Report	Keegan 15'

Olympiastadion, Bruges
Attendance: 29,423
Referee: Rudi Glöckner (East Germany)

Liverpool won 4–3 on aggregate.
