= Azzopardi =

Coat of arms of the Azzopardi family

Azzopardi (Italian pronunciation: [attsoˈpardi]) is a rare Italian surname of Lombardic origin, naturalized in Malta and to a lesser extent in Greece and France.

== Distribution ==
The name is documented in Malta in the forms Azupardu, Azuparda (in the 1419 militia list), Aczupard, Zupard (1480 militia list), Azzupard, Azzoppardo, Azzopardo, Azzopardi, Azzoppardi, Zoppardo, Zopardo (in the Status animarum – church census – of 1687). It still occurs in Northern Italy in the form Azzopardo (mainly in the Julian Venetia), in Sicily in the forms Zuppardo and Zuppardi, and in Corfu as Atsopárdis (Ατσοπάρδης).

== Etymology and history ==
It derives from a combination of the Italian names of Lombardic origin Azzo, meaning 'noble', and Pardo, originally the name of a Germanic tribe (the Bardi, related to the Lombards); Surnames including Azzo are likely related to the Germanic atha(laz) ('noble').

An alternative, disreputed etymology considered the name derived from the Greek sói (σόι, 'race') and párdos (πάρδος, 'panther'), as "fighter of the Saracens" – often referred to as the "Panther race".

Azzopardi is sometimes listed among the names of the Jewish Italkim community, however there are few sources to support this, with a supposed etymology from the word sefardi. As the name is attested (as Azupardu) in Malta's Militia list as early as 1419–1420, before the expulsion of the Jews from Spain, Portugal and Malta, it is unlikely that its etymology may be related to sefardi. According to Godfrey Wettinger, "Some would regard Azzopardi as ethnic, associating it with the word Sephardic referring to an Oriental Jew, but the separate existence of Accio and Pardo as surnames in the twelfth century counsels caution in reaching premature conclusions."

The name was introduced in Northern Italy by one or more Christian settlers from Sicily some time between the 13th and the 15th century, as attested in the name Ogerius Açopardus, borne by a Genoese notary of the 13th century.

== People ==
- Antonio Azzopardi (1805–1881), Maltese settler in Australia
- Ayrton Azzopardi (born 1993), Maltese footballer
- Barry Azzopardi (1947–2017), Gibraltarian chemical engineer
- Charles Azzopardi (1930–1970), Maltese footballer
- Clare Azzopardi (born 1977), Maltese author
- David Azzopardi (1953–2025), Maltese footballer
- Drew Azzopardi (born 2004), American football player
- Edward Azzopardi (born 1977), Maltese footballer
- Francesco Azopardi (1748–1809), Maltese composer
- Franck Azzopardi (born 1970), French footballer
- Frederick Azzopardi (1949–2020), Maltese politician
- Gilles Azzopardi (1967–2020), French actor and theatre director
- Gilles d'Ambra Azzopardi (born 1949), French psychosociologist
- Ġużè Muscat Azzopardi (1853–1927), Maltese novelist
- Ian Azzopardi (born 1982), Maltese footballer
- Jack Frendo Azzopardi (1915–1981), Maltese water polo player
- Jason Azzopardi (born 1971), Maltese politician
- Jayne Azzopardi (born 1980), Australian television personality
- John G. Azzopardi (1929–2013), Maltese pathologist
- Joseph Azzopardi, Chief Justice of Malta (2018–2020)
- Juan Bautista Azopardo (1772–1848), Maltese privateer and Argentine Navy officer
- Justus Azzopardi (18th century), Maltese philosopher
- Keith Azopardi (born 1967), Gibraltarian lawyer and politician
- Keith Azzopardi Tanti (born 1984), Maltese politician
- Maria Azzopardi (born 1983), Maltese footballer
- Mario Philip Azzopardi (born 1950), Maltese television and film director
- Michael Azzopardi (born 1987), Maltese designer and entrepreneur
- Mya Azzopardi (born 2002), Maltese swimmer
- Nicole Azzopardi, Maltese singer-songwriter
- Peppi Azzopardi (born 1959), Maltese television presenter
- Robert Camilleri Azzopardi (1951–2023), Maltese Roman Catholic priest
- Samantha Azzopardi (born 1988), Australian con artist
- Shyanne Azzopardi, Miss Gibraltar 2014
- Trezza Azzopardi (born 1961), Welsh writer
- Vincenzo Frendo Azzopardi, Chief Justice of Malta (1915–1919)

== See also ==
- Azopardi, a variant of the surname
