= Palatka =

Palatka may refer to:

- Palatka, Florida, a city in the United States
- Palatka, Russia, several inhabited localities in Russia
- Palatka (YTB-801), a United States Navy Natick-class large harbor tug
- Palatka, a name used by the ethnic Hungarian minority for Pălatca, a commune in Cluj County, Romania

== See also ==
- East Palatka, Florida, a census-designated place in Florida, United States
