= 1974–75 Czechoslovak First League =

Czechoslovak First League
- Season: 1974–75
- Champions: Slovan Bratislava
- Relegated: Sparta Prague; Nitra
- European Cup: Slovan Bratislava
- Cup Winners' Cup: Spartak Trnava
- UEFA Cup: Inter Bratislava; Bohemians Prague
- Top goalscorer: Ladislav Petráš (20 goals)

Statistics of Czechoslovak First League in the 1974–1975 season.

== Overview ==
It was contested by 16 teams, and ŠK Slovan Bratislava won the championship. Ladislav Petráš was the league's top scorer with 20 goals.

== Stadia and locations ==
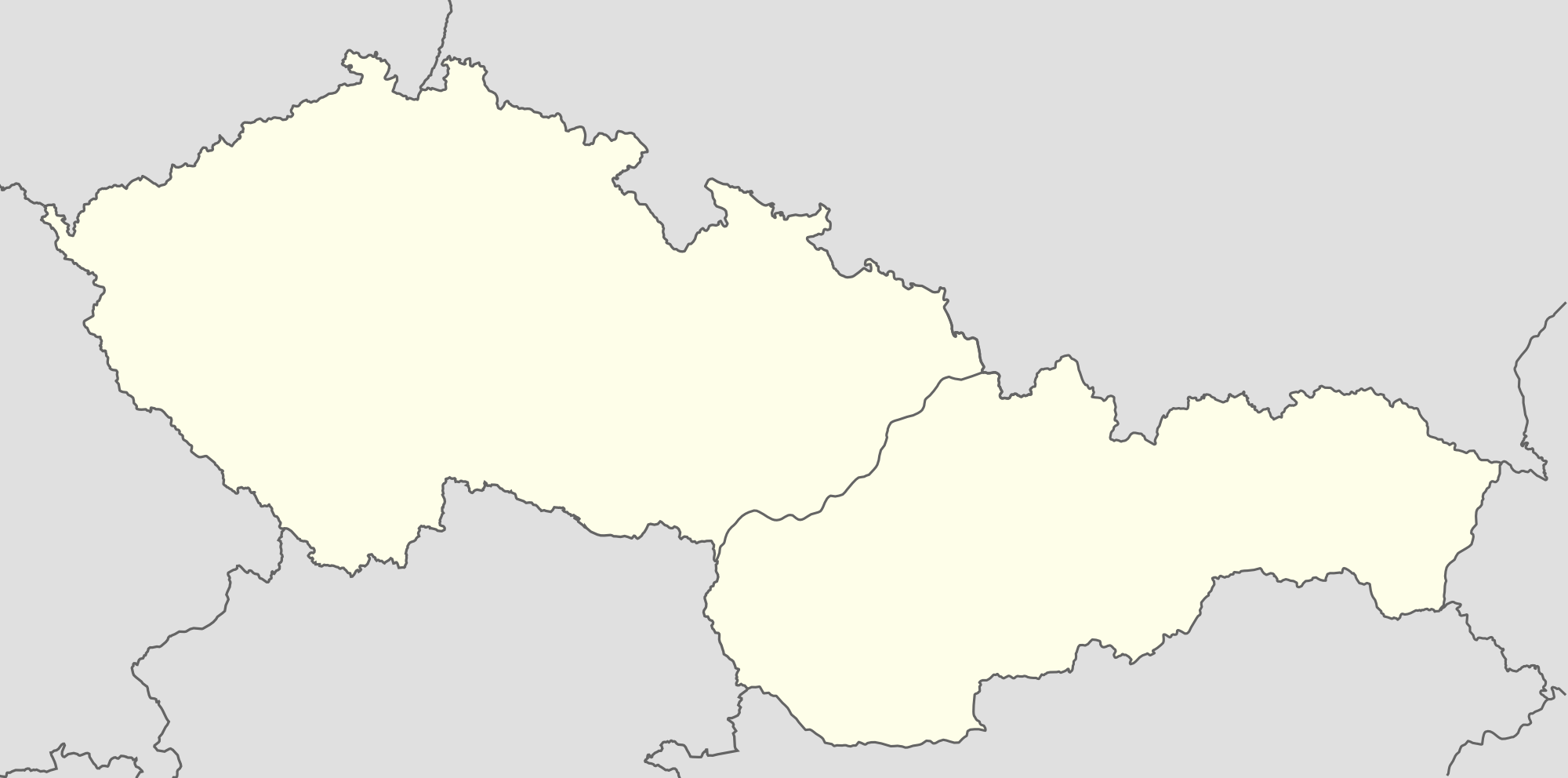
Location of clubs in the 1974–75 Czechoslovak First League

== League standings ==
Pos	Team	Pld	W	D	L	GF	GA	GD	Pts	Qualification or relegation
1	Slovan Bratislava (C)	30	16	7	7	72	34	+38	39	Qualification for European Cup first round
2	Inter Bratislava	30	18	1	11	66	41	+25	37	Qualification for UEFA Cup first round
3	Bohemians Prague	30	15	6	9	46	31	+15	36	Qualification for UEFA Cup first round
4	Zbrojovka Brno	30	12	8	10	37	40	−3	32	
5	Slavia Prague	30	12	6	12	46	44	+2	30	
6	Spartak Trnava	30	12	6	12	32	36	−4	30	Qualification for Cup Winners' Cup first round
7	Sklo Union Teplice	30	9	12	9	28	36	−8	30	
8	VSS Košice	30	12	5	13	66	58	+8	29	
9	Dukla Prague	30	9	11	10	33	35	−2	29	
10	Škoda Plzeň	30	13	2	15	45	53	−8	28	
11	LIAZ Jablonec	30	12	4	14	28	36	−8	28	
12	ZVL Žilina	30	11	6	13	38	49	−11	28	
13	Baník Ostrava	30	9	9	12	32	36	−4	27	
14	TŽ Třinec	30	9	9	12	31	37	−6	27	
15	Sparta Prague (R)	30	11	5	14	44	54	−10	27	Relegation to Czechoslovak Second League
16	Nitra (R)	30	11	1	18	32	56	−24	23	Relegation to Czechoslovak Second League

Source: rsssf.com
(C) Champions; (R) Relegated

== Results ==
Home \ Away	OST	BOH	DUK	INT	JAB	NIT	TEP	PLZ	SLA	SLO	SPA	TRN	TŘI	KOŠ	BRN	ŽIL
Baník Ostrava		0–2	2–1	1–2	0–0	2–1	0–0	3–3	1–0	1–1	1–1	2–0	3–1	0–0	1–0	0–1
Bohemians Prague	1–0		1–2	1–1	3–0	4–0	2–0	1–0	1–1	1–0	4–1	2–2	2–0	5–2	2–0	2–1
Dukla Prague	1–1	0–1		1–0	1–0	4–0	0–0	1–0	1–3	2–1	0–3	1–2	0–0	2–1	0–0	1–1
Inter Bratislava	1–0	2–1	3–1		3–1	2–0	3–1	4–0	2–0	2–4	7–4	3–1	4–0	4–1	7–0	2–0
LIAZ Jablonec	1–0	2–1	1–1	2–1		1–0	0–0	2–1	2–0	2–1	3–1	1–0	1–3	2–1	2–0	2–1
Nitra	1–2	1–0	1–1	2–1	2–1		2–0	2–1	3–1	1–4	0–3	2–1	3–0	2–1	4–1	1–0
Sklo Union Teplice	2–1	2–0	0–0	1–0	1–0	1–0		1–0	1–1	1–1	2–0	2–0	0–0	3–0	2–2	0–0
Škoda Plzeň	0–2	1–0	2–1	3–2	2–1	3–1	2–0		1–0	3–2	2–0	0–1	2–0	3–1	2–0	1–0
Slavia Prague	2–2	2–1	1–0	3–0	2–0	2–0	2–2	4–2		2–0	3–0	1–2	1–1	5–2	1–1	3–1
Slovan Bratislava	4–0	1–1	1–1	1–0	1–0	7–2	4–0	5–2	2–0		5–0	0–0	2–2	2–0	2–0	8–1
Sparta Prague	0–1	1–1	0–3	1–2	1–0	1–0	4–0	5–3	2–0	4–2		1–1	1–0	2–1	1–1	3–0
Spartak Trnava	3–2	0–2	2–1	0–2	2–0	2–0	0–0	2–0	3–1	0–4	2–0		1–0	1–0	1–1	1–2
TŽ Třinec	1–0	5–0	1–2	2–1	1–0	1–0	2–0	3–3	0–1	2–3	0–0	1–0		1–1	1–1	1–0
VSS Košice	3–2	3–0	6–3	3–2	3–0	5–1	3–3	6–2	6–2	0–0	5–1	3–1	1–1		1–0	5–0
Zbrojovka Brno	2–1	0–3	0–0	5–1	0–0	2–0	5–2	2–1	1–0	2–0	2–1	1–0	2–1	4–1		2–1
ZVL Žilina	1–1	1–1	1–1	1–2	3–1	2–0	2–1	1–0	4–2	2–4	3–2	1–1	2–0	4–1	1–0	

Source: statistiky1ligy.fotbal.cz
Legend: Blue = home team win; Yellow = draw; Red = away team win.

== Attendances ==
#	Club	Average	Highest
1	Brno	12,540	25,649
2	Slovan	11,752	31,327
3	Sparta Praha	11,271	30,818
4	Bohemians	9,566	18,316
5	Slavia Praha	9,517	19,208
6	Jablonec	9,338	16,201
7	Baník Ostrava	8,668	17,847
8	Spartak Trnava	7,806	18,326
9	Plzeň	6,908	17,227
10	Inter Bratislava	6,282	22,789
11	Teplice	6,100	10,313
12	Nitra	5,796	8,720
13	VSS	5,300	14,458
14	Žilina	4,277	12,523
15	Třinec	3,929	8,236
16	Dukla Praha	3,640	8,631
