= Vladimir Sakharov =

Vladimir Sakharov may refer to:

- Vladimir Sakharov (footballer)
- Vladimir Sakharov (general)
