= Azopardi =

Azopardi is a Maltese surname, a variant of Azzopardi. Notable people with the surname include:

- Francesco Azopardi (1748–1809), Maltese composer and music theorist
- Keith Azopardi (born 1967), Gibraltarian lawyer and politician

== See also ==
- Azzopardi
