= Azzopardi phenomenon =

The Azzopardi phenomenon, or Azzopardi effect, is the presence of DNA in necrotic venules. It can occur in small cell carcinomas and in some high-grade malignant neoplasms. The effect is well known in diagnostic surgical pathology. The phenomenon is named after the pathologist, John G. Azzopardi.

Azzopardi was able to correctly characterize the effect as due to DNA; it had been thought previously but incorrectly to be calcium. Necrosis results in the release of cellular DNA, which adheres in patches to the walls of blood vessels, showing as intensely basophilic material on hematoxylin-eosin stain.
