= 1980 Totonero =

Scandal of football match fixing in Italy in 1980

Totonero 1980 or Totonero was a match-fixing scandal in Italy in 1980 in Serie A and Serie B. The participants in this scandal were Avellino, Bologna, Lazio, Milan, and Perugia of Serie A and Palermo and Taranto of Serie B, as well as several players from these and other teams in Italy, all of whom were declared guilty after the trials. Notably, Paolo Rossi was suspended for three years (reduced to two on appeal), and upon his return helped Italy in their successful 1982 FIFA World Cup campaign.

== Background ==
In 1946, Italy introduced a state-run pool for citizens to bet on football, called the Totocalcio. It was the only form of legalized football betting in the country until the late 1990s. For fans to win, they needed to correctly pick the outcome of 13 games, making it virtually impossible for the pool to be fixed since so many matches were involved. Because of this, the only way to bet on a single match or the winners of events like the Coppa Italia or Serie A was to bet with illegal bookmakers.

The plan was created in 1979 by Alvaro Trinca, owner of a restaurant in Rome, and his supplier Massimo Cruciani. The restaurant was a popular spot for many Lazio players, a few of whom agreed to fix matches in exchange for a cut of the money. The first match arranged to be fixed was a friendly between Lazio and Palermo on 1 November 1979, which ended in a draw as planned. However, many of the games did not end as planned, and Trinca and Cruciani had reportedly lost over 100 million lire by February 1980 (worth around €310,000 in 2020).

On 1 March 1980, Trinca and Cruciani filed a report with Rome's Public Prosecutor with the names of 27 players and 13 clubs across Serie A and Serie B. Trinca was arrested eight days later and Cruciani three days after that. On 23 March, the Guardia di Finanza arrested 13 players and Milan president Felice Colombo immediately after the final whistle of that day's matches. All of those arrested were acquitted of criminal charges because there was no law against match fixing in Italy at the time.

== Punishments ==
=== Club punishments ===
- Milan (Serie A); relegated to Serie B.
- Lazio (Serie A); relegated to Serie B (10 million lire fine in original punishment).
- Avellino (Serie A); 5 point penalty in Serie A 1980–81.
- Bologna (Serie A); 5 point penalty in Serie A 1980–81.
- Perugia (Serie A); 5 point penalty in Serie A 1980–81.
- Palermo (Serie B); 5 point penalty in Serie B 1980–81 (acquitted in original verdict).
- Taranto (Serie B); 5 point penalty in Serie B 1980–81 (acquitted in original verdict).

=== Individual punishments ===
==== Presidents ====
- Felice Colombo (Milan); disbar.
- Tommaso Fabretti (Bologna); 1 year suspension.

==== Players ====
- Stefano Pellegrini (Avellino); 6 year suspension.
- Massimo Cacciatori (Lazio); 5 year suspension (disbar in original punishment).
- Enrico Albertosi (Milan); 4 year suspension (disbar in original punishment).
- Bruno Giordano (Lazio); 3 year and 6 month suspension (1 year and 6 months in original punishment).
- Lionello Manfredonia (Lazio); 3 year and 6 month suspension (1 year and 6 months in original punishment).
- Carlo Petrini (Bologna); 3 year and 6 month suspension.
- Guido Magherini (Palermo); 3 year and 6 month suspension (1 year and 6 months in original punishment).
- Giuseppe Savoldi (Bologna); 3 year and 6 month suspension.
- Lionello Massimelli (Taranto); 3 year suspension (1 year in original punishment).
- Luciano Zecchini (Perugia); 3 year suspension.
- Giuseppe Wilson (Lazio); 3 year suspension (disbar in original punishment).
- Paolo Rossi (Perugia); 2 years suspension (3 years in original punishment).
- Franco Cordova (Avellino); 1 year and 2 month suspension.
- Carlo Merlo (Lecce); 1 year suspension (1 year and 6 months in original punishment).
- Giorgio Morini (Milan); 1 year suspension.
- Stefano Chiodi (Milan); 6 month suspension.
- Piergiorgio Negrisolo (Pescara); 5 month suspension (1 year in original punishment).
- Maurizio Montesi (Lazio); 4 month suspension.
- Franco Colomba (Bologna); 3 month suspension.
- Oscar Damiani (Napoli); 3 month suspension (4 months in original punishment).

== Aftermath ==
- Perugia and Taranto were both relegated from their respective leagues following the 1980–81 season. Perugia would have been relegated even without the point deduction, but Taranto would have been safe had they not been given the five point penalty.
- All of the players whose bans were still active when Italy won the 1982 World Cup were reinstated soon after.

== See also ==
- 1986 Totonero
- 2011–12 Italian football match-fixing scandal
- 2015 Italian football match-fixing scandal
- Calciopoli
- Caso Genoa
- Match fixing in association football
