= Valeri Filatov =

Russian footballer, manager, and administrator

Personal information
- Full name: Valeri Nikolayevich Filatov
- Date of birth: 18 November 1950 (age 75)
- Place of birth: Ashgabat, Turkmen SSR
- Height: 1.78 m (5 ft 10 in)
- Position: Midfielder

Youth career
- SDYuSShOR-5 Minsk

Senior career*
| Years | Team | Apps | (Gls) |
| 1968 | FC Yenbek Dzhezkazgan | | |
| 1969 | FC Trud Volkovysk | | |
| 1970 | FC Yenbek Dzhezkazgan | 6 | (0) |
| 1970–1971 | FC Druzhba Maykop | | (3) |
| 1972–1973 | FC SKA Rostov-on-Don | 22 | (1) |
| 1974–1979 | FC Torpedo Moscow | 137 | (11) |
| 1980 | FC Spartak Moscow | 1 | (0) |
| 1981 | FC Torpedo-Amateur Moscow | | |
| 1983 | FC Torpedo Moscow | 0 | (0) |

Managerial career
- 1982–1986: FC Torpedo Moscow (assistant)
- 1989–1990: FC Lokomotiv Moscow (assistant)
- 1991: FC Lokomotiv Moscow
- 1992–2006: FC Lokomotiv Moscow (president)
- 2008: FC Moscow (president)
- * Club domestic league appearances and goals

Valeri Nikolayevich Filatov (Russian: Валерий Николаевич Филатов; born 18 November 1950) is a Russian football administrator and former player and manager.

He was the president of FC Lokomotiv Moscow from 1992 to 2006, under his leadership and the management of Yuri Semin Lokomotiv won their two Russian Professional Football League titles in 2002 and 2004.

== Honours as a player ==
- Soviet Top League champion: 1976 (autumn).
- Soviet Top League runner-up: 1980.
