= Charles Azzopardi =

Maltese footballer

Charlie Azzopardi
Personal information
- Full name: Charles Azzopardi
- Date of birth: 21 December 1930
- Place of birth: Floriana, Malta
- Date of death: 28 October 1970 (aged 39)
- Position: Striker

Youth career
- 1946–1947: Ajax

Senior career*
Years	Team	Apps	(Gls)
1947–1953	Floriana	100	(47)
1953–1955	Rabat FC	23	(8)
1955–1956	Floriana	6	(0)

International career
- Malta U21
- Malta FA XI
- * Club domestic league appearances and goals as of 11 January 2010

Charles Azzopardi (21 December 1930 – 28 October 1970) was a Maltese footballer.

== Club career ==
A centre-forward or right winger, Azzopardi was part of the famous Floriana side of the 1950s, winning three league titles, two FA Trophy medals and a Cassar Cup with them. He then had a two-year spell at Rabat FC before returning to Floriana where he retired at only 26 years of age.

== International career ==
Azzopardi was part of the Maltese FA U-20 team at the Palermo Youth Tournament in 1949–50. He also played 10 times for a Maltese FA XI, a few years before Malta played his first official international game.

== Personal life ==
His father George Azzopardi also played for Floriana as well as his uncles Manwel and Tony. Charlie died in 1970, just two months short of his 40th birthday.

== Honours ==
=== Floriana ===
- Maltese Premier League:4

1950, 1951, 1952, 1953

- Maltese FA Trophy: 2

1949, 1950
