= Stefano Pellegrini (footballer, born 1953) =

Italian footballer

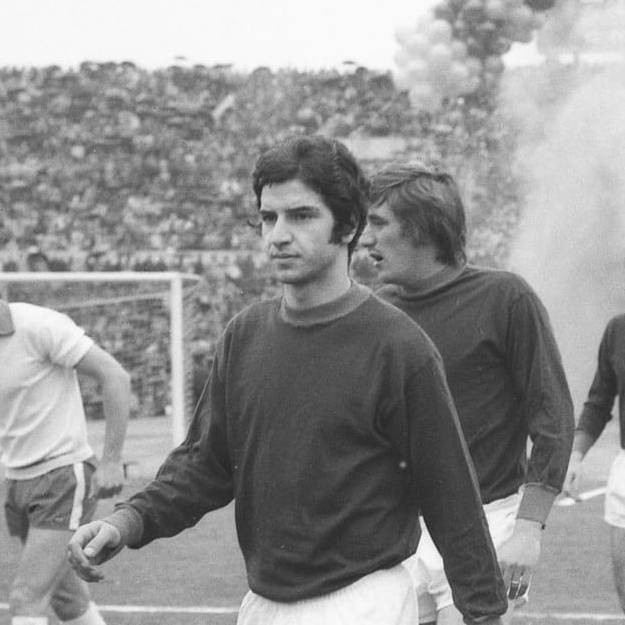
- Pellegrini with Roma in 1971

Personal information
- Date of birth: 5 August 1953
- Place of birth: Rome, Italy
- Date of death: 18 March 2018 (aged 64)
- Place of death: Rome, Italy
- Height: 1.81 m (5 ft 11 1/2 in)
- Position: Striker

Senior career*
Years	Team	Apps	(Gls)
1970–1977	Roma	41	(6)
1973–1974	→ Avellino (loan)	12	(2)
1974–1975	→ Barletta (loan)	29	(10)
1977–1979	Bari	53	(16)
1979–1980	Avellino	12	(3)
Total		147	(37)
- * Club domestic league appearances and goals

Stefano Pellegrini (5 August 1953 – 18 March 2018) was an Italian professional footballer who played as a striker.

== Career ==
Pellegrini began playing football with Roma, where he made his Serie A debut against Lazio on 14 March 1971. He played for 6 seasons (53 games, 9 goals) in the Serie A for A.S. Roma and Avellino.

His older brother Romolo Pellegrini and younger brother Claudio Pellegrini also played football professionally. To distinguish them, Romolo was referred to as Pellegrini I, Stefano as Pellegrini II and Claudio as Pellegrini III.

His career ended with a 6-year ban in the Totonero 1980 match-fixing scandal.
