= 1974 Danish 1st Division =

29th season of Danish 1st Division

Danish 1st Division
- Season: 1974

Statistics of Danish 1st Division in the 1974 season.

== Overview ==
It was contested by 12 teams, and Kjøbenhavns Boldklub won the championship.

== League standings ==
Pos	Team	Pld	W	D	L	GF	GA	GD	Pts
1	Kjøbenhavns Boldklub	22	15	3	4	48	24	+24	33
2	Vejle Boldklub	22	11	3	8	47	35	+12	25
3	Boldklubben 1903	22	9	6	7	37	28	+9	24
4	Holbæk B&I	22	9	6	7	33	30	+3	24
5	B 1901	22	9	5	8	40	38	+2	23
6	Randers Sportsklub Freja	22	8	7	7	34	36	−2	23
7	Boldklubben Frem	22	10	2	10	37	36	+1	22
8	Næstved IF	22	8	5	9	40	38	+2	21
9	Køge BK	22	7	6	9	31	42	−11	20
10	Aalborg Boldspilklub	22	6	7	9	35	41	−6	19
11	Slagelse B&I	22	6	5	11	29	38	−9	17
12	Hvidovre IF	22	4	5	13	24	49	−25	13

== Results ==
Home \ Away	AaB	B01	B03	BKF	HOL	HIF	KB	KBK	NIF	RSF	SBI	VBK
Aalborg BK	—	3–1	1–1	0–1	3–0	2–2	3–2	2–3	2–4	2–3	1–1	3–1
B 1901	2–1	—	1–1	1–0	4–1	2–1	0–2	0–0	4–2	2–2	3–1	1–2
B 1903	2–1	4–3	—	4–2	0–2	4–0	0–1	4–1	2–1	4–0	0–0	4–0
BK Frem	0–1	5–2	1–0	—	1–2	4–0	1–1	3–1	1–2	0–4	3–1	2–4
Holbæk B&I	1–1	5–1	0–0	0–0	—	1–0	2–3	2–1	1–2	4–1	0–0	1–2
Hvidovre IF	0–0	0–2	2–2	1–3	2–5	—	1–1	1–2	2–1	2–1	3–2	1–0
Kjøbenhavns BK	4–2	2–0	3–1	5–0	1–1	5–1	—	1–0	2–1	3–0	1–0	2–0
Køge BK	2–2	0–4	3–0	4–1	2–2	2–0	0–4	—	1–1	0–1	3–1	3–2
Næstved IF	1–1	3–3	2–0	0–2	0–1	3–0	1–2	1–0	—	3–3	2–2	4–2
Randers Freja	5–1	0–2	0–0	0–5	1–0	2–2	5–2	1–1	2–1	—	3–1	0–0
Slagelse B&I	2–3	1–0	2–3	3–0	1–2	2–1	2–0	2–2	2–1	1–0	—	0–3
Vejle BK	3–0	2–2	2–1	0–2	4–0	3–2	3–1	7–0	3–4	0–0	4–2	—

Legend: Blue = home team win; Yellow = draw; Red = away team win.
