= Walter Krause (footballer, born 1953) =

German footballer

Personal information
- Date of birth: 8 May 1953
- Height: 1.78 m (5 ft 10 in)
- Position: Midfielder

Senior career*
Years	Team	Apps	(Gls)
1971–1972	Kickers Offenbach	4	(0)
1972–1974	Hamburger SV	20	(2)
1974–1975	MSV Duisburg	13	(2)
1974–1975	Rot-Weiß Oberhausen	16	(9)
1975–1976	MSV Duisburg	8	(1)
1975–1976	SG Wattenscheid 09	20	(13)
1976–1984	Kickers Offenbach	263	(100)
- * Club domestic league appearances and goals

Walter Krause (born 8 May 1953) is a German former footballer.

He scored 119 goals in the 2. Bundesliga. Before the start of the 2012–13 season only four players amassed more goals than Krause in the (West) German second division.
