= Gilles d'Ambra Azzopardi =

French psychosociologist

Gilles d'Ambra Azzopardi (born 2 August 1949) is a French psychosociologist. He is the author of numerous books on practical psychology for the mainstream readers, on male-female relationships and management. In this respect, he is an active contributor in his role as Strategic Advisor for Monkey-tie, the first recruitment platform that links people to businesses based on corporate culture and personality (for instance through the implementation of the Big 5 personality traits).

== Early life and education ==
Azzopardi is of Italian and Maltese origin. He was raised in an anti-fascist family, His grandfather was a communist activist in the 1920s/ He spent much of his childhood days in the midst of war and moved to France a few days after Algeria gained its independence.

Azzopardi graduated from high school in May, 1968. He then founded the CAL (or Comité d'action lycéen), a student driven activism group in the occupied Sorbonne, which initiated the general strike across French high schools.

By end 1968, he joined the brand new Vincennes University (Paris VIII) where he co-created the proletarian leftist group, in particular the Politico-military Commission wing, with the Rolin brothers.

During the same period, he was given the position of Instructor of Philosophy while following the teachings of Gilles Deleuze, Michel Foucault, François Châtelet, Judith Miller, Robert Castel...

At University he studied classics Human Sciences (philosophy, sociology, psychology).

== Career ==
After his university years, he steered his focus to the study of human interactions and cognitive functions. His works would be strongly influenced by psychoanalytics and evolutionary psychology, being the first proponent in France in the latter since the early 1990s. He later became the French specialist for psychometric evaluations for IQ, personality, and recruitment.

The author of several best-sellers, he regularly writes for business and women's magazines such as Management, Elle, 20 Ans and Madame Figaro for the most popular ones. His works have been published in many countries abroad including Japan, South Korea, Hong Kong, Taiwan, Thailand, Russia, India, Canada and Australia.

== Publications ==
(in French)

Under the name Gilles d'Ambra

- Le Complexe d’Œdipe : le rapport mère fils en question, Marabout psychologie, 1984.
- Vivez bien vos émotions, Sand, 1996. ISBN 2-71-070542-7
- Les Hommes racontés aux femmes, Lattès, 1998.
- Découvrir son profil psychologique, Marabout psychologie, 1999.
- Testez votre quotient émotionnel, Marabout psychologie, 1999. ISBN 2-50-103267-5
- Couple : le check up, Marabout psychologie, 2001.
- Comment dompter son patron, First, 2002. ISBN 2-87-691693-2
- Amour, sexualité, travail... tous les tests pour faire les bons choix, Marabout psychologie, 2003.
- Pourquoi les hommes sont lâches : Petit précis de psychologie masculine à l'usage des femmes qui aiment encore les hommes, First, 2006. ISBN 2-75-400232-4
- Astro Politicus, vous croyez le connaître..., Hugo Doc, 2007. ISBN 2-75-560135-3
- Décodeur des rêves, First, 2009. ISBN 2-75-401294-X
- Pourquoi l'amour donne des ailes ? Petites notions de psychologie pour trouver l'amour et le garder, First, 2007. ISBN 2-75-400349-5
- Pourquoi les hommes ne pensent qu'à ça et les femmes préfèrent le chocolat ?, First, 2008. ISBN 2-29-002281-0

Under the name Gilles Azzopardi

- Réussir les tests d'entreprise, Marabout, 1983.
- Mesurez votre QI, Marabout, 1989

English translation : Measure Your I.Q., W Foulsham & Co Ltd, 1993.

- Développez votre intelligence, Marabout, 1990

English translation : The Complete Book to Develop Your I.Q., W Foulsham & Co Ltd, 1993.

- Réussissez les tests d'intelligence, Marabout, 1990

English translation : Succeed at I.Q. Tests, W Foulsham & Co Ltd, 1993.

- Les Nouveaux Tests de recrutement, Marabout, 1995.
- Avez-vous le profil de l'emploi, Marabout, 1995.
- Réussir les tests de sélection, Marabout, 1998

English translation : Learn to Succeed at Selection Tests, W Foulsham & Co Ltd, 2000.

- QE, QI, dopez votre intelligence, Marabout, 1998. ISBN 2-50-103031-1

English translation : IQ May Get You a Job; EQ Gets You Promoted, W Foulsham & Co Ltd, 2000.

- Le Guide du recrutement, Marabout, 2000. ISBN 2-50-103405-8
- Tests d’entreprise : mode d’emploi, Marabout, 2001.
- Mieux se connaître pour réussir, Marabout psychologie, 2004.
- Boostez votre cerveau, Marabout psychologie, 2005.
- Réussir les nouveaux tests de QI, Marabout, 2006.
- Testez votre intelligence, Marabout, 2006.
- 150 Kastêtes, Leduc, 2006.
- Calculez votre QI-Pro, Leduc, 2006.
- 100 Jeux logiques pour mesurer votre intelligence, Hachette Pratique, 2007.
- 100 Tests mémoire pour la garder au top, Hachette Pratique, 2007.
- Manuel de manipulation, First, 2008.
- Votre mémoire : la tester, la booster, First, 2008.
- Réussissez par l’auto-coaching, De Vecchi, 2008.
- Manuel de maîtrise de soi, First, 2009.
- Boostez votre créativité : 300 jeux d'intelligence pour doper vos deux cerveaux (et votre vie !), First, 2009. ISBN 2-75-401201-X
- Manuel de réussite, First, 2010.
- Les Secrets de la manipulation efficace, First, 2011.
- Moi (en vrai) : les principaux tests de personnalité pour mieux vous connaître, 2011.
- Le bonheur est dans la citrouille : Être heureux, c’est d’abord dans la tête !, First, 2012. ISBN 2-75-404141-9
- Manipulation : 300 trucs et astuces pour obtenir tout ce que vous voulez, First, 2013. ISBN 2-75-404738-7
- La Vérité sur les accords toltèques, First, 2013. ISBN 2-75-405388-3
- Nouveau manuel de manipulation, First, 2014. ISBN 2-75-405782-X
- Infidélités et Manipulations, First, 2015.
- Réussir les tests psychotechniques, L'Etudiant, 2015

Under the name Nicolas Conti (pseudo name)

- 300 Énigmes : Casse-tête et jeux de logique pour booster vos neurones, First, 2007.
- Gym cérébrale pour les Nuls, First, 2009.
- 501 Énigmes : Casse-tête, jeux d'esprit et de logique pour travailler plus (du cerveau) et gagner plus (de plaisir), First, 2009.
- Muscler son QI pour les Nuls, First, 2011. ISBN 2-75-403339-4
- Énigmes diaboliques pour les Nuls, First, 2011. ISBN 2-75-403159-6
- 501 nouvelles énigmes : Casse-tête, jeux de logique, codes secrets..., First, 2011. ISBN 2-75-403038-7
- Exercices pour améliorer sa mémoire pour les Nuls, First, 2011. ISBN 2-75-403145-6
- Les Tests psychotechniques pour les Nuls, First, 2012. ISBN 2-75-404166-4
- Jeux de mémoire pour les Nuls, First, 2012.
- L’Officiel des énigmes, First, 2012. ISBN 2-75-403804-3
- Énigmes mathématiques pour les Nuls, First, 2013. ISBN 2-75-403145-6
