= Justus Azzopardi =

Maltese Catholic priest and philosopher (fl. 1762)

- Born: Malta
- Occupations: Catholic priest; philosopher; professor
- Notable work: Neo-Veteris Philosophiæ Summa

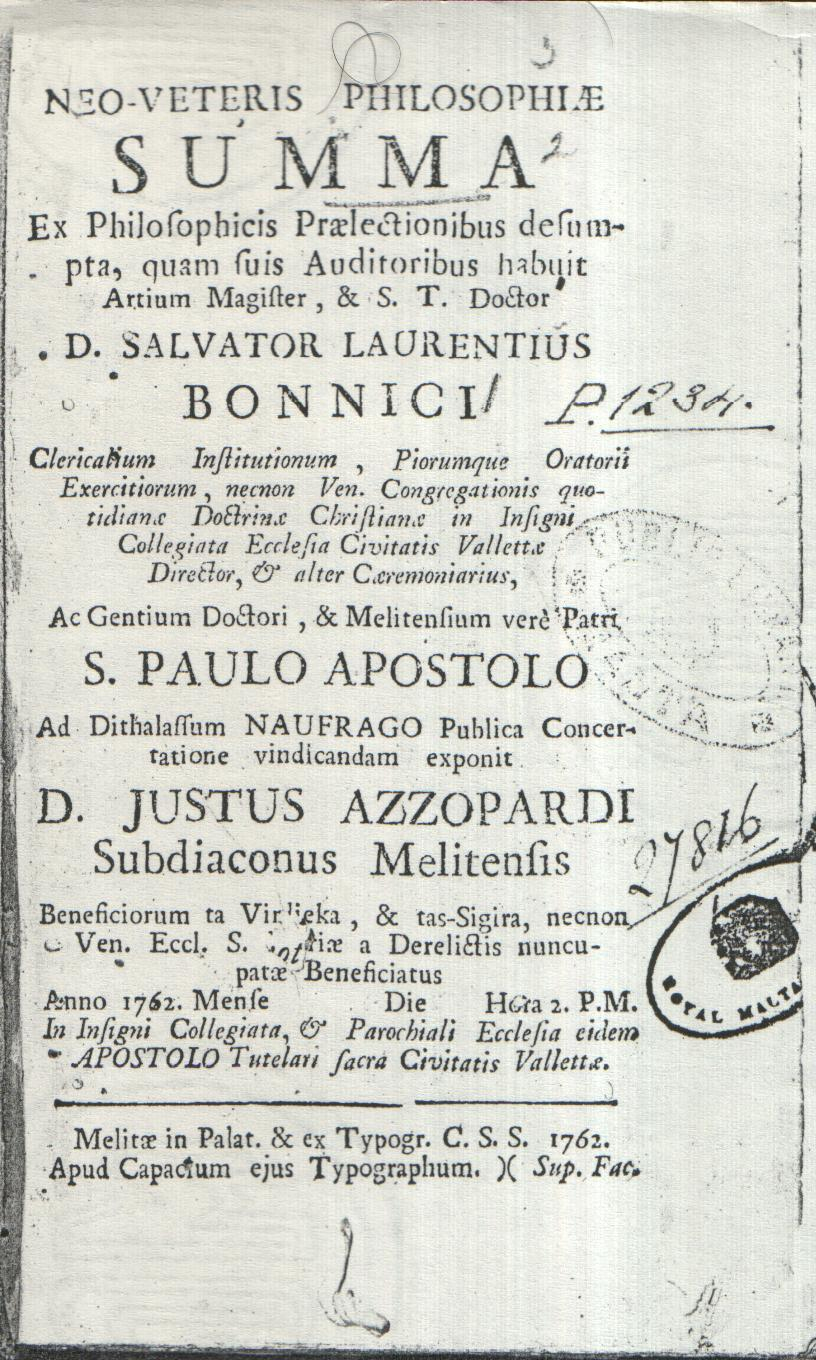
Neo-Veteris Philosophiæ Summa

Justus Azzopardi (fl. 1762) was a Maltese Catholic priest and philosopher. His area of specialisation in philosophy was mainly metaphysics.

== Life ==
Little is known of Azzopardi's personal life. He was a diocesan priest, a professor of philosophy and an adherent to Aristotelian-Thomistic scholasticism.

== Work ==
Just one work is known to have originated from the hand of Azzopardi: Neo-Veteris Philosophiæ Summa (A Compilation of Old and New Philosophy). It is work composed in 1762, when its author was still in his youth. No other works of Azzopardi are known to exist.

The Neo-Veteris was published in Malta at the printing press of the Grand Masters of the Knights Hospitaller. It is made up of 48 pages and divided into eight main parts. Azzopardi states that he understood the study under the guidance of Saviour Lawrence Bonnici, who was presumably his philosophy teacher.

The eight main parts of the work successively deal with (1) philosophy in general, (2) logic, (3) physics, (4) Aristotle's On the Heavens and the Earth, (5) Aristotle's On Birth and Death, (6) Aristotle's On the Soul, (7) ontology, and (8) pneumatology. The last two parts are metaphysical studies. The work concludes with an addendum concerning ethics.

== See also ==
- Philosophy in Malta
