= Gert Heidler =

German footballer and manager (born 1948)

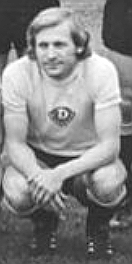

Personal information
- Date of birth: 30 January 1948 (age 78)
- Place of birth: Doberschau-Gaußig, Soviet-occupied Germany
- Position: Striker

Senior career*
Years	Team	Apps	(Gls)
1967–1982	Dynamo Dresden	281	(49)

International career
1976–1978	East Germany	9	(2)
Medal record
Men's Football
Representing East Germany
Football
Gold medal – first place	1976 Montreal	Team competition
- * Club domestic league appearances and goals

Gert Heidler (born 30 January 1948) is a former East German professional footballer and football manager.

== Club career ==
The forward played for Dynamo Dresden from 1968 until 1982, making 281 appearances for the first team.

== International career ==
He won the gold medal at the 1976 Summer Olympics with the East German Olympic Team. Heidler won caps for the full GDR team between 1976 and 1978.
