= Vladimir Sakharov (footballer) =

Soviet footballer

Personal information
- Full name: Vladimir Nikolayevich Sakharov
- Date of birth: 5 February 1948 (age 78)
- Place of birth: Palatka, Russia, USSR
- Height: 1.71 m (5 ft 7 in)
- Positions: Striker; midfielder

Senior career*
Years	Team	Apps	(Gls)
1966	FC Tyazhmash Syzran		
1967	Krylia Sovetov Kuibyshev	28	(1)
1968–1974	Dinamo Minsk	179	(23)
1975–1981	Torpedo Moscow	165	(25)

International career
1975–1976	USSR	4	(0)

Managerial career
- 2001–2002: Torpedo-ZIL Moscow (director)
- * Club domestic league appearances and goals

Vladimir Nikolayevich Sakharov (Russian: Владимир Николаевич Сахаров; born 5 February 1948) is a retired Soviet football player.

== Honours ==
- Soviet Top League winner: 1976 (autumn).

== International career ==
Sakharov made his debut for USSR on October 12, 1975, in a UEFA Euro 1976 qualifier against Switzerland (USSR did not qualify for the final tournament).
