= Gilles Azzopardi =

French actor (1967–2020)

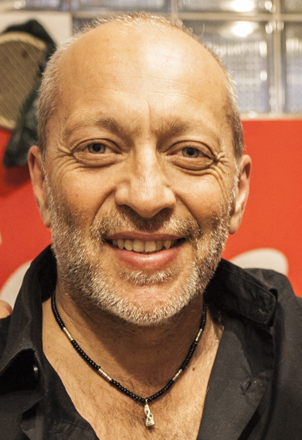
- Born: 20 March 1967; Marseille, France
- Died: 30 October 2020 (aged 53)
- Occupation: Actor

Gilles Azzopardi (20 March 1967 – 30 October 2020) was a French actor and theatre director.

== Biography ==
The artistic career of Azzopardi started with music in 1995. He joined fellow musician Richard Larroze and formed a band called Azzo. They released an album titled IL =. In 1997, while the album was being mixed and edited, Azzopardi was offered an audition for the film Taxi by Luc Besson. Even though it was a small role, he advanced his career significantly. His next audition came for the film Le schpountz, although Azzopardi did not receive a role. However, his casters believed that he had a bright future ahead of him.

In 1998, Azzopardi began training at the Chocolat-Théâtre in Marseille. After three years, the theatre began allowing him to act in stage productions. He created his own theatre company called Les Spécimens. In multiple productions, he combined his talents in playwriting, directing, and acting.

Gilles Azzopardi died on 30 October 2020 at the age of 53 following a long illness.

== Career ==
=== Theatre ===
==== Playwright, Director, and Actor ====
- Hallucinémation (2001)
- Masculin Plurielle (2002)
- Château, scalpel et viande froide (2003)
- Le grand chambardement (2004)
- Les snipers de l'info (2005)
- Buzz Off (2006)
- Le Grand Cirque (2007)
- Le grand chambardement (reprise) (2009–2011)
- La chaise ou qui veut gagner des milliards ? (2010)
- Don Facciomacco (2012)

==== Playwright and Director ====
- Le béret de la tortue

==== Director ====
- Le sens du ludique (2005)
- L'Arapède (2005)
- Poétique et névrotique (2007)
- Un cacou et une cagole (2007)
- L'œuf, la poule ou Nicole (2010)

==== Actor ====
- Théâtre sans animaux
- Le dîner de cons

=== Filmography ===
- Sous le soleil
- Dock 13
- Le Tuteur
- Le Miroir de l'eau
- Chante !
- Paul Sauvage (2004)
- Plus belle la vie (2006)
- Enquêtes réservées (2009–2013)
- Les Toqués (2010)
- No Limit (2012)
- Plus belle la vie (2018)

== Awards ==
- Director's Award and Interpretation Award for Buzz Off at the Festival de Gémenos (2006)
- Prize for Best Comedy for Masculin Plurielle at the Festival FADA (2007)
