= Barry Azzopardi =

Barry Azzopardi (1947–2017) was a professor of chemical engineering specialising in multiphase flow research. He was a chartered engineer and Fellow of the Institution of Chemical Engineers.

== Life ==
Azzopardi was born in Gibraltar, obtained a BTech degree in chemical engineering at the University of Bradford in 1972 and a PhD in the same subject at the University of Exeter in 1977. He died 22 May 2017 due to cancer.

== Career ==
After work at the University of Oxford and the AERE, Harwell he took up the position of Lady Trent Professor of Chemical Engineering at the University of Nottingham in 1990 and Head of the Department of Chemical Engineering until 1997. He retained this position until his death in 2017. He was an editor of Chemical Engineering Research and Design: Part A, an Official Journal of the European Federation of Chemical Engineering (EFCE) and had been an organiser and member of scientific committees of the Assembly of World Conferences on Experimental Heat Transfer, fluid mechanics and thermodynamics, as well as the 2007 International Conference on Multiphase Flow (ICMF). At these, and other, conferences he gave keynote lectures. He was also the chair of the EFCE Working Party on Multi-Phase Flow from 1991 to 2000.

== Selected publications ==
- YANG, L. and AZZOPARDI, B. J., 2007. Phase split of liquid-liquid two-phase flow at a horizontal T-junction. Internal Journal of Multiphase Flow, 33(2), 207–216.
- AZZOPARDI, B., 2006. Flow controlled critical heat flux: developments in annular flow modelling. Archives of Thermodynamics, 27(2), 3–22.
- LESTER, E., BLOOD, P., DENYER, J., GIDDINGS, D., AZZOPARDI, B. and POLIAKOFF, M., 2006. Reaction engineering: the supercritical water hydrothermal synthesis of nano-particles. Journal of Supercritical Fluids, 37(2), 209–214.
- MAK, C. Y., OMEBERE-IYARI, N. K. and AZZOPARDI, B. J., 2006. The split of vertical two-phase flow at a small diameter T-junction. Chemical Engineering Science, 61(19), 6261–6272.
- YANG, L., AZZOPARDI, B.J., BELGHAZI, A. and NAKANISHI, S., 2006. Phase separation of liquid-liquid two-phase flow at a T-junction. AIChE Journal, 52(1), 141–149.
- CHONG, L. Y., AZZOPARDI, B. J. and BATE, D. J., 2005. Calculation of considerations at which dryout occurs in the serpentine channels of fired reboilers. Chemical Engineering Research & Design, 83(4), 412–422.
- DAS, G., DAS, P. K. and AZZOPARDI, B. J., 2005. The split of stratified gas–liquid flow at a small diameter T-junction. International Journal of Multiphase Flow, 31(4), 514–528.
- EASTWICK, C.N., HEUBNER, K., AZZOPARDI, B.J., SIMMONS, K.A., YOUNG, C. and MORRISON, R., 2005. Film flow around bearing chamber support structures. In: Proceedings of ASME Turbo Expo 2005: Power for Land, Sea and Air, Reno, USA. New York: ASME Press, 3.
- HANKINS, N., HILAL, N., OGUNBIYI, O. O. and AZZOPARDI, B., 2005. Inverted polarity micellar enhanced ultrafiltration for the treatment of heavy metal polluted wastewater. Desalination, 185(1–3), 185–202.
