= John Gordon (referee) =

Scottish football referee (1930–2000)

John Robertson Proudfoot Gordon (10 February 1930 – 21 November 2000) was a Scottish football referee. He was born in Inverness.

Gordon was selected to officiate at the 1978 FIFA World Cup but was suspended later that year by the Scottish FA for improper behaviour. He, along with assistants Rollo Kyle and David McCartney, admitted to receiving gifts from AC Milan prior to handling their 1978 UEFA Cup clash with Levski Sofia. The Italians won the match Gordon refereed, the home leg of a second round tie, 3–0.

John Gordon died in 2000 in Dundee. He was pre-deceased by Rollo Kyle, who died after refereeing a game some 20 years previously.
