= René Notten =

Dutch footballer and manager

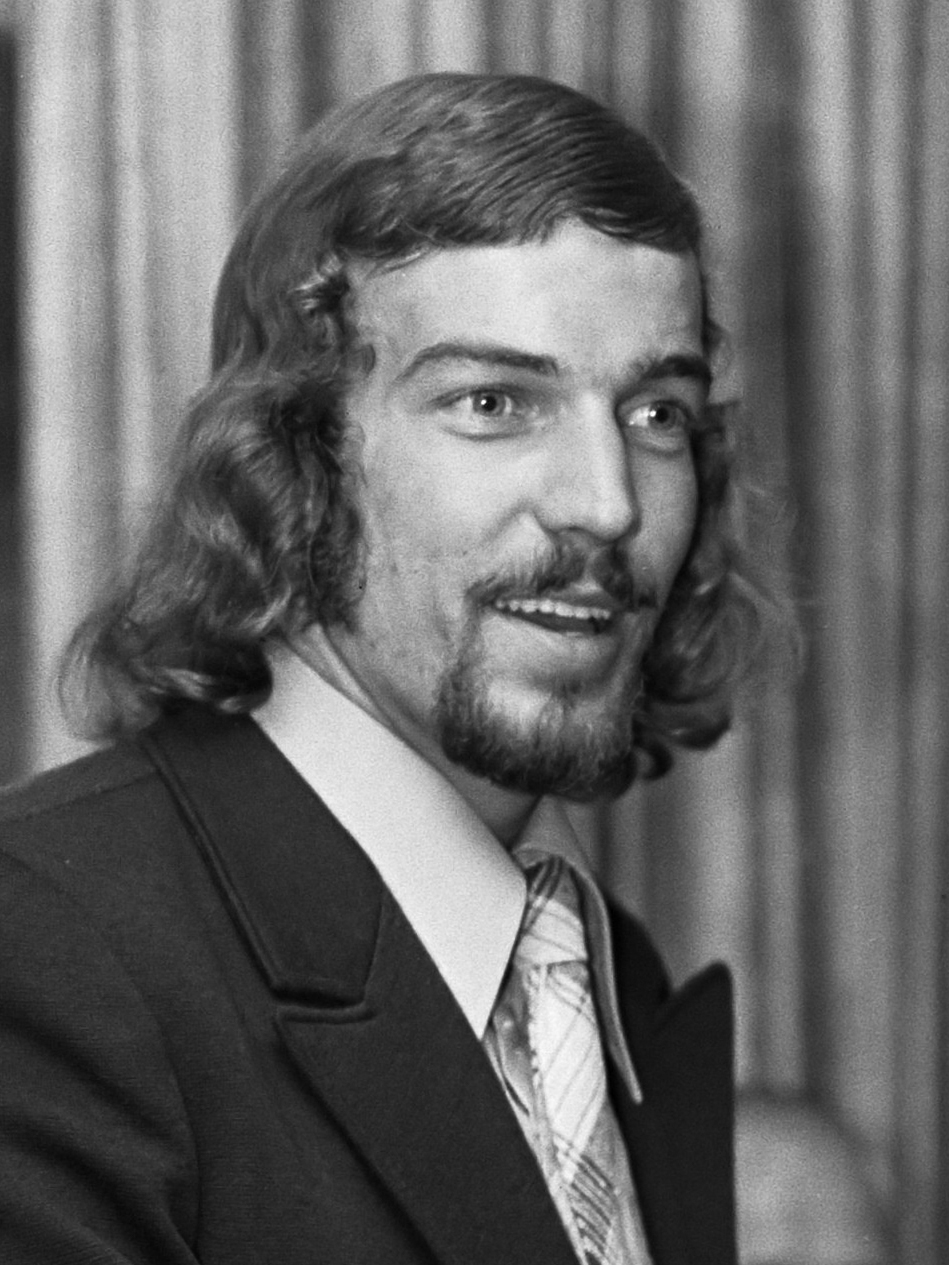
- Notten in 1974

Personal information
- Full name: Reinirus Wilhelmus Antonius Notten
- Date of birth: 20 November 1949
- Place of birth: Hengelo, Netherlands
- Date of death: 22 August 1995 (aged 45)
- Place of death: Oranjestad, Aruba
- Position: Midfielder

Senior career*
Years	Team	Apps	(Gls)
1968–1974	FC Twente	148	(15)
1974-1977	Ajax	83	(7)
1977–1981	Feyenoord	113	(17)
1981–1983	Harelbeke	?	(?)
1983–1984	DS'79	13	(1)
1984–1985	1. FC Bocholt	?	(?)
1985	PEC Zwolle	7	(0)
1985–1986	De Graafschap	?	(?)

International career
1974–1975	Netherlands	5	(0)

Managerial career
- 1988–1992: ADO Den Haag
- 1992–1994: FC Emmen
- 1995: Aruba
- * Club domestic league appearances and goals

Reinirus Wilhelmus Antonius "René" Notten (20 November 1949 – 22 August 1995) was a Dutch footballer and manager who last worked as head coach of the Aruba national football team. He made five appearances for the Netherlands national team between 1974 and 1975.

== Playing career ==
Notten made his professional debut at FC Twente in September 1968. He later played for Ajax, Feyenoord, Harelbeke (Belgium), DS'79, 1. FC Bocholt (Germany), PEC Zwolle, and De Graafschap. He played 364 matches and made 40 goals in the Dutch Eredivisie.

== Managerial career ==
Notten started his managerial career in 1992 with Emmen in the Dutch Eerste Divisie, a position he held until 1994. After that, he coached the Aruba national football team.

== Death ==
On 22 August 1995, Notten died as a result of cardiac arrest on Aruba, shortly after extending his contract as national manager of the Aruban football team.

== Career statistics ==
=== International ===
Appearances and goals by national team and year
National team	Year	Apps	Goals
Netherlands	1974	4	0
Netherlands	1975	1	0
Total		5	0

== Honours ==
Ajax

- Eredivisie: 1976-77

== See also ==
- De Klassieker
