= John G. Azzopardi =

John G. Azzopardi (2 January, 1929, Malta – 2 January, 2013, London) was a prominent pathologist, recognized for his contributions to diagnostic surgical pathology, particularly in breast pathology. His name is also eponymously connected with his elucidation of the Azzopardi phenomenon.

He started his medical training at the Royal University of Malta in 1942 at the age of 13. After he qualified as MD in 1949, he moved to England. His entire career, with the exception of sabbaticals at the Armed Forces Institute of Pathology, Washington DC (1960 – 1961) and two months at the University of Bologna in 1972, was in pathology at the Royal Postgraduate Medical School, Hammersmith Hospital, London, where he held a series of positions, including Professor of Oncology.

In 2006, an international symposium was held in his honor, where he was presented with a lifetime achievement award by the International Society of Breast Pathology.
