= Palatka (YTB-801) =

Tugboat of the United States Navy

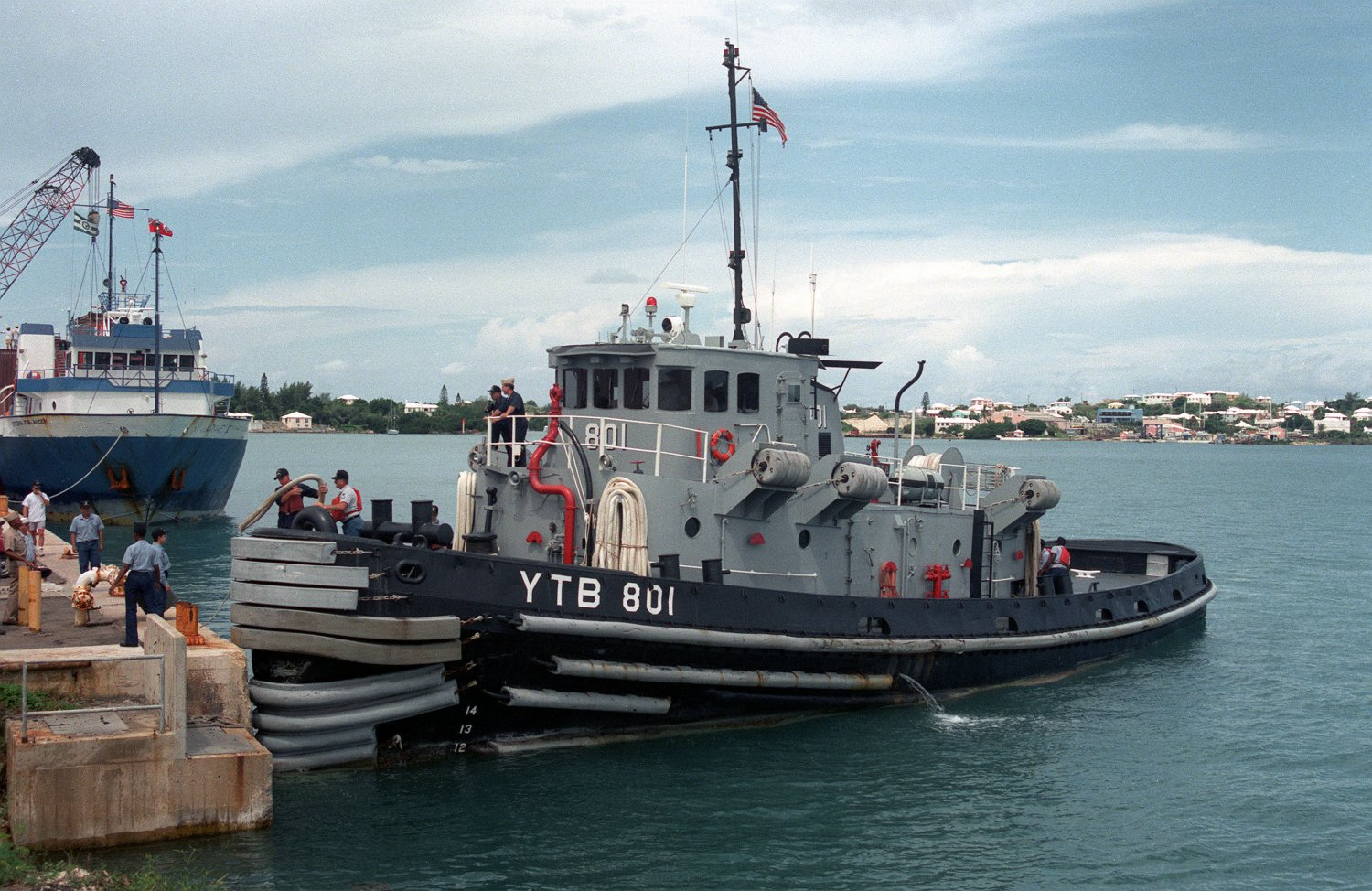
- On 26 August 1994, Palatka casts off for the last time from her former homeport at NAS Burmuda to start her three-day journey to her new homeport at Norfolk, VA. The final departure of Palatka was part of a reduction in services associated with the September 1995 base closure of NAS Bermuda.

History

United States
- Awarded: 2 May 1968
- Builder: Southern Shipbuilding Corp, Slidell, Louisiana
- Laid down: 29 November 1968
- Launched: 19 August 1969
- Acquired: 25 November 1969
- Stricken: 4 April 1995
- Identification: IMO number: 8980816
- Fate: Sold into commercial service as Maverick, 16 July 2001
- Notes: Sources: NVR, DANFS

General characteristics
- Class & type: Natick-class large harbor tug
- Displacement: 283 long tons (288 t) (light); 356 long tons (362 t) (full)
- Length: 109 ft (33 m)
- Beam: 31 ft (9.4 m)
- Draft: 14 ft (4.3 m)
- Speed: 12 knots (14 mph; 22 km/h)
- Complement: 12
- Armament: None
- Notes: Sources: NVR, DANFS

Palatka (YTB-801) was a United States Navy Natick-class large harbor tug named for Palatka, Florida.

== Construction ==
The contract for Palatka was awarded 2 May 1968. She was laid down 29 November 1968 at Slidell, Louisiana, by Southern Shipbuilding Corp and launched 19 August 1969.

== Operational history ==
Delivered 7 November 1969, Palatka was assigned to the 5th Naval District. She was later assigned to Naval Air Station Bermuda where she served until 1995. A Large Harbor Tug, she was specially configured to berth and dock nuclear-powered submarines and aircraft carriers. She was also equipped to provide emergency rescue and other services.

Stricken from the Navy List 4 April 1995, ex-Palatka was sold 16 July 2001, by the Defense Reutilization and Marketing Service (DRMS) to Boston Towing for $437,335 and renamed Maverick. Ex-Palatka was sold to Runner Marine Limited of Lagos, Nigeria in 2011 and renamed Alfa.
