= Parish family book =

The parish family book (Latin: Status animarum, meaning "State of Souls") is a register of people living in a parish and of events related to them. It is particularly characteristic of the Roman Catholic Church. The parish family books were prescribed in the Rituale Romanum published in 1614 by Pope Paul V.

At first, they only contained data about sacraments received, religious knowledge, and religious affiliation. In the 18th century other data were added such as house numbers and ages. The parish family books were maintained by parish priests. They were most precise in villages because the population was more stable there than in cities.

A parish book can be a useful primary source for religious historians, art historians, sociologists, and other scholars.

Some parishes still require producing a parish book for the Sacrament of Marriage.
