= Ladislav Petráš =

Slovak footballer

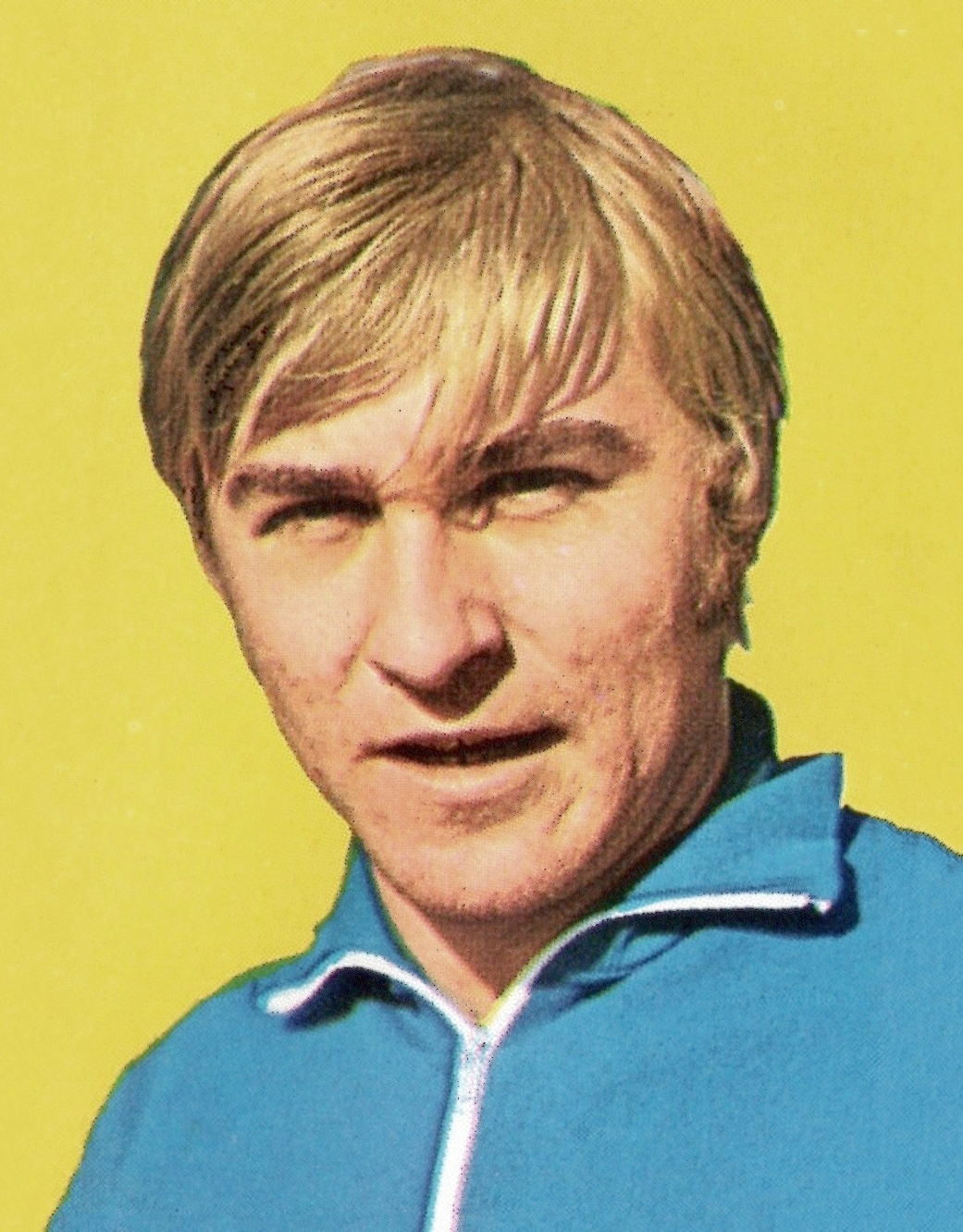

Personal information
- Date of birth: 1 December 1946 (age 79)
- Place of birth: Prievidza-Necpaly, Czechoslovakia
- Position: Forward

Youth career
- Baník Prievidza

Senior career*
Years	Team	Apps	(Gls)
1964–1968	Baník Prievidza		
1968–1969	Dukla Banská Bystrica	21	(20)
1969–1980	Inter Bratislava	218	(65)
1980	Favoritner AC		
1980-1985	SK Vorwärts Steyr		

International career
1969–1977	Czechoslovakia	19	(6)

Managerial career
- 2006: Slovakia U21
Medal record
Representing Czechoslovakia
UEFA European Championship
Winner	1976 Yugoslavia
- * Club domestic league appearances and goals

Ladislav Petráš (born 1 December 1946) is a former Slovak football player. He played 19 matches for Czechoslovakia national team and scored six goals. Petráš was a participant at the 1970 FIFA World Cup, where he played three matches and scored two goals. Petráš also took part in the Euro 1976, where his team won the tournament. After scoring Czechoslovakia's only goal against Brazil, Petráš celebrated by kneeling and performing the sign of the cross, demonstrating his Catholic faith in defiance against the Communist regime in Czechoslovakia, which was contrary to any religious belief. Petráš continues to be a Roman Catholic. In the second match of the tournament, Petráš scored the first goal of the match against Romania at the 4th minute.

Domestically Petráš played for Dukla Banská Bystrica and later for Inter Bratislava.
