= Francesco Azopardi =

Maltese composer and music theorist (1748–1809)

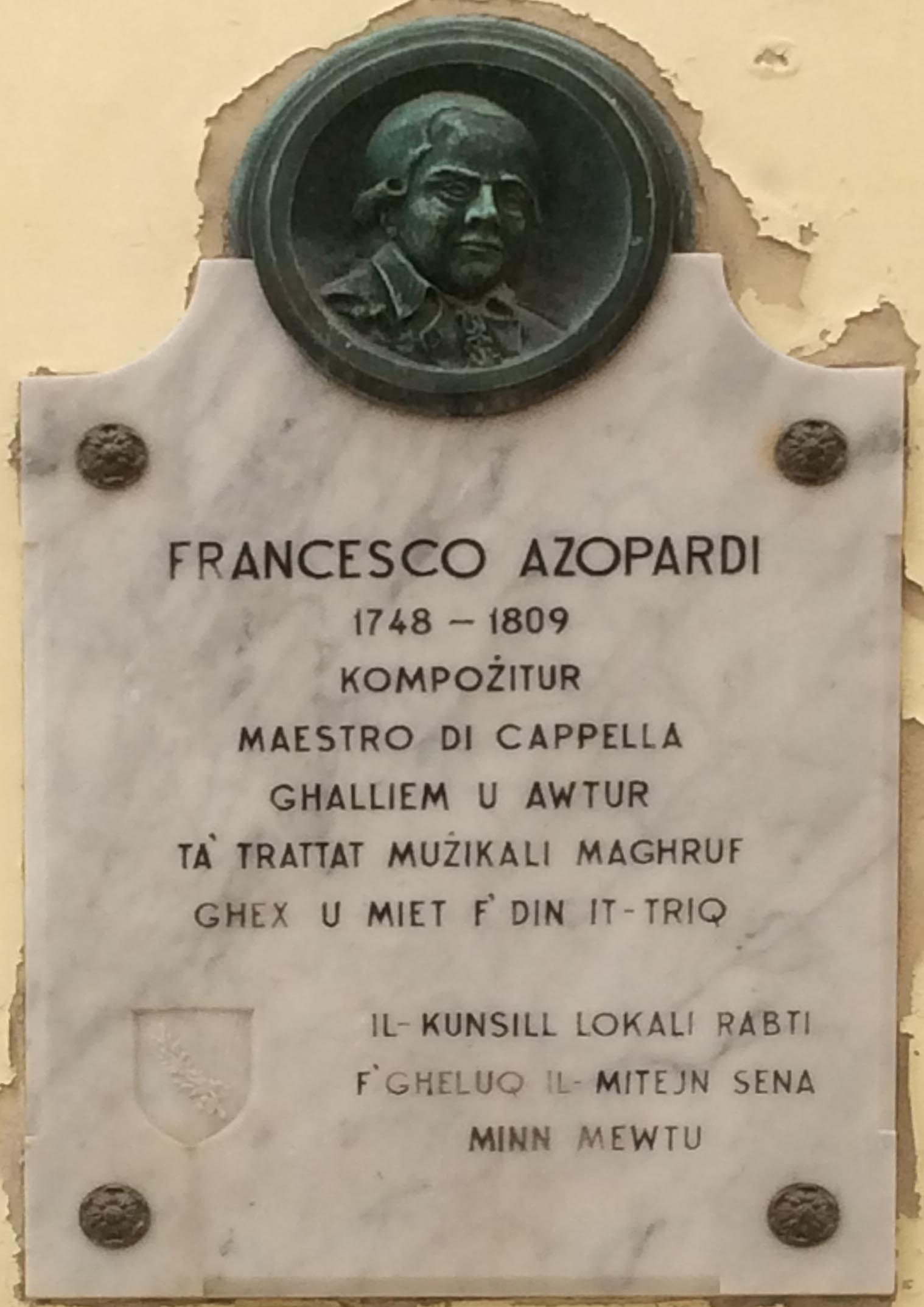
Plaque commemorating Azopardi in his hometown Rabat

Francesco Azopardi (or Azzopardi) (May 5, 1748 – February 1809) was a Maltese composer and music theorist.

== Life and career ==
Azopardi was born in Notabile. He received his musical training in Malta and during his stay from 1763 to 1774 in Naples at the Conservatory of San Onofrio under Carlo Cotumacci and Joseph Doll. He worked at St. Paul's Cathedral, Mdina, and, from 1789 following the Napoleonic invasion and flight of the Knights of St. John, combined his responsibilities at Mdina with those at St. John's Co-Cathedral in Valletta. One of his successes was a setting of Metastasio's libretto La Passione di Gesù Cristo he conducted at the Manoel Theatre in Valletta in 1782. He died in Rabat.

He is known especially through his work Il Musico Prattico, which appeared in French translation by Nicolas-Étienne Framery.

== Works ==
=== Secular music ===
- Malta felice (cantata, 1775)
- La magica lanterna (opera buffa, 1791)

=== Sacred vocal music ===
- La passione di Cristo (oratorio, libretto by Pietro Metastasio, 1782, 1802)
- Various masses composed between 1768 and 1806
- Various sacred works composed between 1772 and 1796
- Songs, hymns and psalms composed between 1772 and 1807

=== Instrumental music ===
- Overture for 2 oboes, 2 violins, 2 horns, bass, and organ (1782)
- Sinfonia for 2 oboes, 2 violins, 2 violas, horn and basso continuo (1797)
- Sinfonia for oboe obbligato, oboe, 2 violins, 2 horns and basso continuo (1799)

=== Treatises ===
- Il musico prattico
- Dissertazione sulla risoluzione della quinta falsa in 6/4 rivolto dell'armonia di 5/3
- Dissertazione sulla musica greca

== Selected recordings ==
- Les manuscrits de Malte 3 – Oeuvres de Francesco Azopardi: Lauda Sion. Assumpta est. Beatus Vir. Confitebor. Dixit Dominus. Maîtrise des Bouches du Rhône, leader Jeannine Prosper, Jeune Ensemble Baroque de Provence, dir. Giuseppe Dellavalle. Studio SM, Paris. 1998.
