= David Azzopardi =

Maltese footballer (1953–2025)

David Azzopardi (12 November 1953 – 20 November 2025) was a Maltese footballer.

== Career ==
From 1973 to 1982, Azzopardi played as a midfielder for Sliema Wanderers F.C. He made ten appearances for the Malta national team.

== Death ==
Azzopardi died on 20 November 2025, at the age of 72.
