= Palatka, Russia =

Palatka (Russian: Палатка) is the name of several inhabited localities in Russia.

Urban localities

- Palatka, Magadan Oblast, an urban-type settlement in Khasynsky District of Magadan Oblast; 60°6′N 150°56′E

Rural localities

- Palatka, Nizhny Novgorod Oblast, a village in Achkinsky Selsoviet of Sergachsky District in Nizhny Novgorod Oblast
